= Yeshivas in World War II =

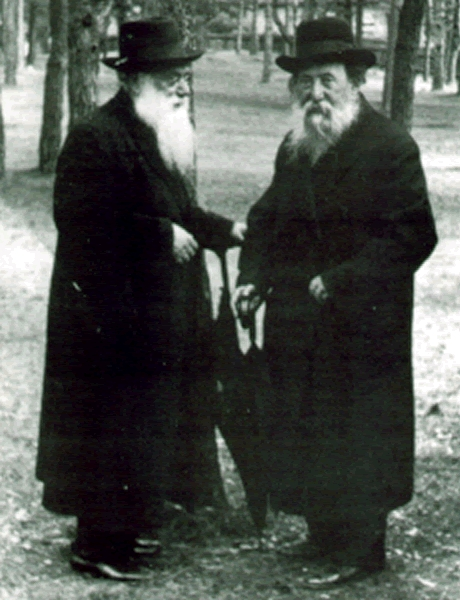
Rabbi Grodzinski (right) and the rosh yeshiva of the Grodno Yeshiva, Rabbi Shimon Shkop

After the German invasion of Poland in World War II and the division of Poland between Germany and the Soviet Union, many yeshivas (Jewish schools of Torah study, generally for boys and men) that had previously been part of Poland found themselves under Soviet communist rule, which did not tolerate religious institutions. The yeshivas therefore escaped to Vilnius in Lithuania on the advice of Rabbi Chaim Ozer Grodzinski. In Lithuania, the yeshivas were able to function fully for over a year and many of the students survived the Holocaust because of their taking refuge there, either because they managed to escape from there or because they were ultimately deported to other areas of Russia that the Nazis did not reach. Many students, however, did not manage to escape and were killed by the Nazis or their Lithuanian collaborators.

== Background ==
Before the Second World War, there were many yeshivas in Eastern Europe, mostly in what is present-day Belarus and Lithuania as well as Poland, and what was then mostly the Second Polish Republic. These include the yeshivas of Mir, Slabodka, Telshe, Radin, Lomza, Kaminetz, Kletsk, Grodno, Baranovich, and Bialystok. Thousands of students flocked to Eastern Europe from all over the world, mostly from local locations, but also from Sweden, the United States, Germany, England, Belgium, and more, to study in the famous yeshivas under venerable rosh yeshivas.

== Escape to Vilnius ==
At the outbreak of World War II in September 1939, the Nazis overran Poland before partitioning it with the Soviet Union. Rabbi Chaim Ozer Grodzinski, a leader of European Torah Jewry, then sent out an urgent message to all the yeshivas that had just fallen under Soviet rule, instructing them to escape to Vilnius (Yiddish: Vilna), previously part of Poland which at that point had also fallen under Soviet rule. However, Grodzinski knew that the Russians and Lithuanians had made an agreement that they would return Vilnius to Lithuania, which had been their capital city for centuries. Many of the yeshivas, including Mir, Kletsk, Kaminetz, Baranovich, Grodno, and Radin, therefore escaped to Vilnius. Altogether, there were about 25,000 Jewish refugees in Vilnius at the time. In an interview published by Rabbi Dov Eliach, a student recalled that the Polish refugees were warmly welcomed by the Jews of Vilnius, with many of them hosting refugees in their homes, sometimes even aiding their guests financially.

Although the Prime Minister of Lithuania treated the Jews well, his government decided after a few weeks that having the capital city packed with refugees was an unsustainable situation, and so the yeshivas were ordered to scatter throughout the nearby towns. The Kaminetz yeshiva relocated to Rasein; the Mir yeshiva to Keidan; the Radin yeshiva to Eishishok; the Kletsk yeshiva to Yanov; the Baranovich yeshiva to Troki, and later Smilishoki; the Bialystok yeshiva of Novardok to Birzh; and the Pinsk yeshiva of Novardok to Wilkomir. The exiled yeshivas were supported by the American Jewish Joint Distribution Committee and the rabbinate in America.

== Attempts to escape Europe ==
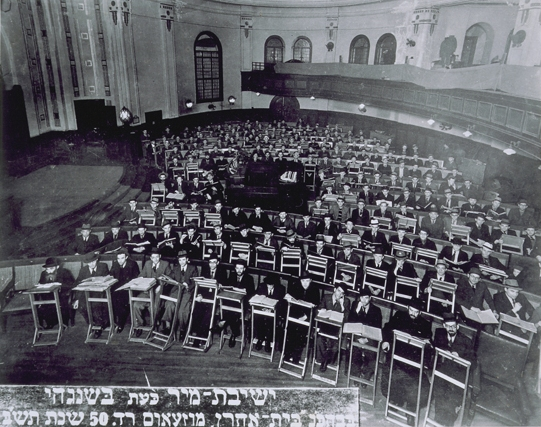
The Mir yeshiva in Shanghai

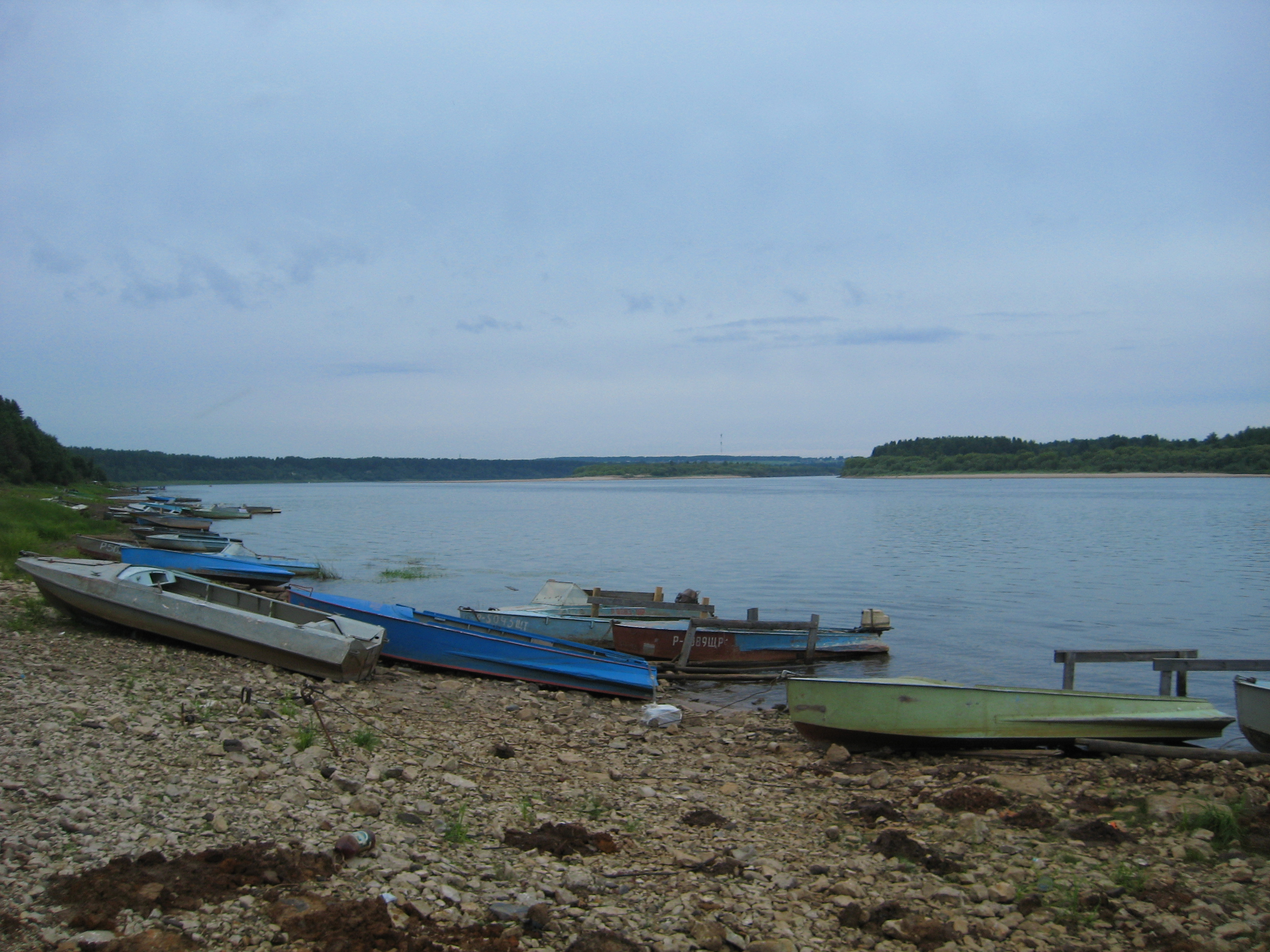
Zheshart in the Komi Republic, one of the places to which yeshiva students were sent by the Soviets

The refugees in Lithuania knew that staying where they were in Europe was not a permanent solution, as they were situated between two warring nations, with Nazi Germany to the west and the Soviet Union to the east. The Vaad Hayeshivos ("The Council of Yeshivas", an organization in Eastern Europe led by Grodzinski that helped support the region's yeshivas) worked to supply all the yeshiva students with visas and passports that they would need to escape Europe for Japan and Curacao. Japanese consul Chiune Sugihara issued visas to refugees, against his country's orders. The visas for Curaçao were issued by the Dutch consul Jan Zwartendijk. It was actually not a real visa, but a note in the passport that no visa was required for Curaçao. For many of the students, the visas were insufficient: they needed to cross Russia to Japan on the Trans-Siberian Railway, and tickets cost $170, money which many of them did not have (according to Rabbi Dov Eliach's interview with an alumnus of the Kaminetz Yeshiva).

The nasi (president) of the Mir yeshiva, Rabbi Avraham Kalmanowitz, went to the United States, understanding that he would be able to help the Jews in Europe much more from there. He was one of the heads of the Vaad Hatzolah in America, and collected money to help his yeshiva. Rabbi Shlomo Wolbe, who was in Sweden at the time, and Mike Tress from the United States, also helped collect the funds. In the end, virtually the entire Mir yeshiva was able to escape Europe via the Trans-Siberian Railway to Vladivostok, and from there to Kobe, Japan. The yeshiva, together with many other Jewish refugees who managed to escape to the east, was later transferred to Shanghai, where the Japanese interned them in a ghetto. Kalmanowitz continued sending money to them. Fragments of the Polish Hasidic Chachmei Lublin Yeshiva also managed to escape to Japan and then China, and studied in the same beth midrash (study hall) as the Mir students.

The many students who remained in Lithuania continued their escape efforts, attempting to travel to America. Although Vilnius had originally been given by the Soviets to Lithuania, the Soviets soon took over the entire region in 1940. When the Russian government found out that the yeshiva students were attempting to leave for America, they began to view the students as anti-Communist and against the Soviet Union. They therefore did not want them so close to the war front, lest the Germans invaded Russia and the yeshiva students joined sides with them (as the Nazis were intent on wiping out European Jewry, the yeshivas would not have joined them anyway). They therefore made plans to deport the students to Siberia. However, Russian soldiers had been commandeering Jewish homes in Lithuania, and when the hosts got wind of the situation, they warned the yeshiva students of the government's plans. Many of the students went into hiding to avoid the deportation, while other felt it would be safer for them in Siberia than to be so close to the Nazi front. In the end, many of the yeshiva students, including those from the Kaminetz, Radin, and Bialystok yeshivas, were sent to Russia, although not all to Siberia. While some, including students from Novardok and their teacher, Rabbi Yehudah Leib Nekritz, and future-rabbi Yaakov Galinsky, were indeed sent to Siberia, others (as published in the book Tales of Devotion in the name of a student) were taken to the remote Komi Republic at the foot of the Ural Mountains where they were subjected to forced labor.

== The Holocaust ==
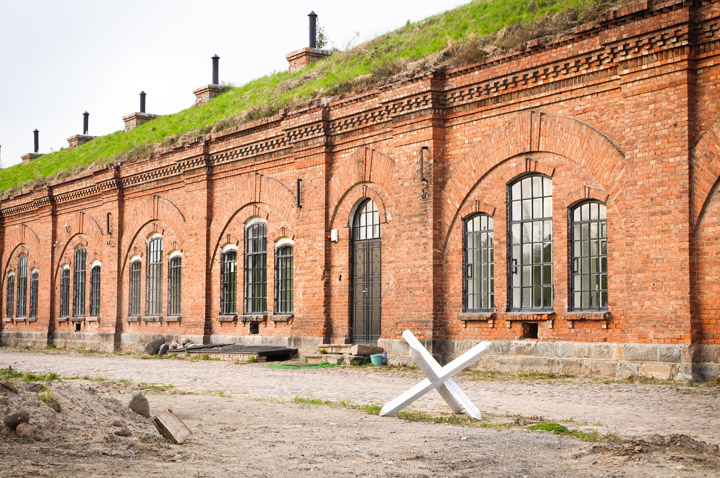
The Seventh Fort, where thousands of Jews were murdered by Lithuanian Nazi sympathizers

According to the book Tales of Devotion, mere days after the yeshiva students' deportation to the Komi Republic, the Nazis invaded Lithuania. The students who had stayed behind hoping for safety were ultimately killed by the Nazis.

The Telshe yeshiva was located in the city of Telšiai (Yiddish: Telshe) in Lithuania, and was therefore relatively already safe when World War II broke out. However, plans were made to move the yeshiva to the United States, and Rabbi Elya Meir Bloch and Rabbi Chaim Mordechai Katz traveled to America to arrange the transfer. The yeshiva, led by Rabbi Avraham Yitzchak Bloch, continued in Telshe. While the rosh yeshiva's daughter and son-in-law, Rabbi Baruch Sorotzkin and Rebbetzin Rochel Sorotzkin, fled to Japan, Rabbi Avraham Yitzchak Bloch remained in Lithuania with his students. All of the remaining yeshiva students as well and the rosh yeshiva were killed by the Nazis soon after.

The members of the Kelm Talmud Torah, also already located in Lithuania since before the outbreak of World War II, were also massacred in the Holocaust, along with the rest of the city's Jewish population. Rounded up on July 29, 1941, the Jews were marched to the forest on the outskirts of the city to be murdered. The yeshiva's mashgiach ruchani, Rabbi Doniel Movshovitz, was forced to lead the Jews, with his brother-in-law Rabbi Gershon Miadnik, holding a sefer Torah, and the city's rabbi, Rabbi Kalman Reinishovitz, alongside him. They were then forced to dig graves. Before being killed, Movshovitz received permission to speak to everyone, and afterwards, they were all shot.

In the town of Slabodka, on June 25, 1941, the Kaunas pogrom broke out, during which thousands of Jews were murdered. It was around this time that the entire Slabodka yeshiva was wiped out, with 108 students and teachers killed in a single week. Many were killed in the Seventh and Ninth Forts, where Lithuanian Nazi collaborators murdered thousands of Jews. Rabbi Elchonon Wasserman of Baranovich and Rabbi Avrohom Grodzinski of Slabodka were murdered around that time too, in the Seventh Fort. The members of the Ponovezh Yeshiva were all killed by the Nazis as well. The rosh yeshiva, Rabbi Yosef Shlomo Kahaneman, was in Palestine at the time.

== Outside of Europe ==
While the yeshivas affected the most were located in Europe, the yeshivas in Mandatory Palestine and the United States were affected as well. In 1942, Nazi general Erwin Rommel and his army conquered North Africa and planned to advance further into Palestine. All the Jews in the region, which included the students of the Chevron Yeshiva, Yeshivas Eitz Chaim, and Yeshiva Porat Yosef, were terrified of succumbing to the Holocaust. In the end, the British defeated Rommel in the Battle of El Alamein in Egypt.

The United States was also affected by the war. In 1940, Zeirei Agudath Israel founded a night yeshiva for young Jewish refugees from Europe. Headed at first by Rabbi Gedalia Schorr and later by Rabbi Shlomo Rottenberg, its teachers included Rabbi Berel Belsky (father of Rabbi Yisroel Belsky), Rabbi Simcha Wasserman, Rabbi Shachne Zohn, and Rabbi Yaakov Moshe Shurkin.

== Reestablishment ==
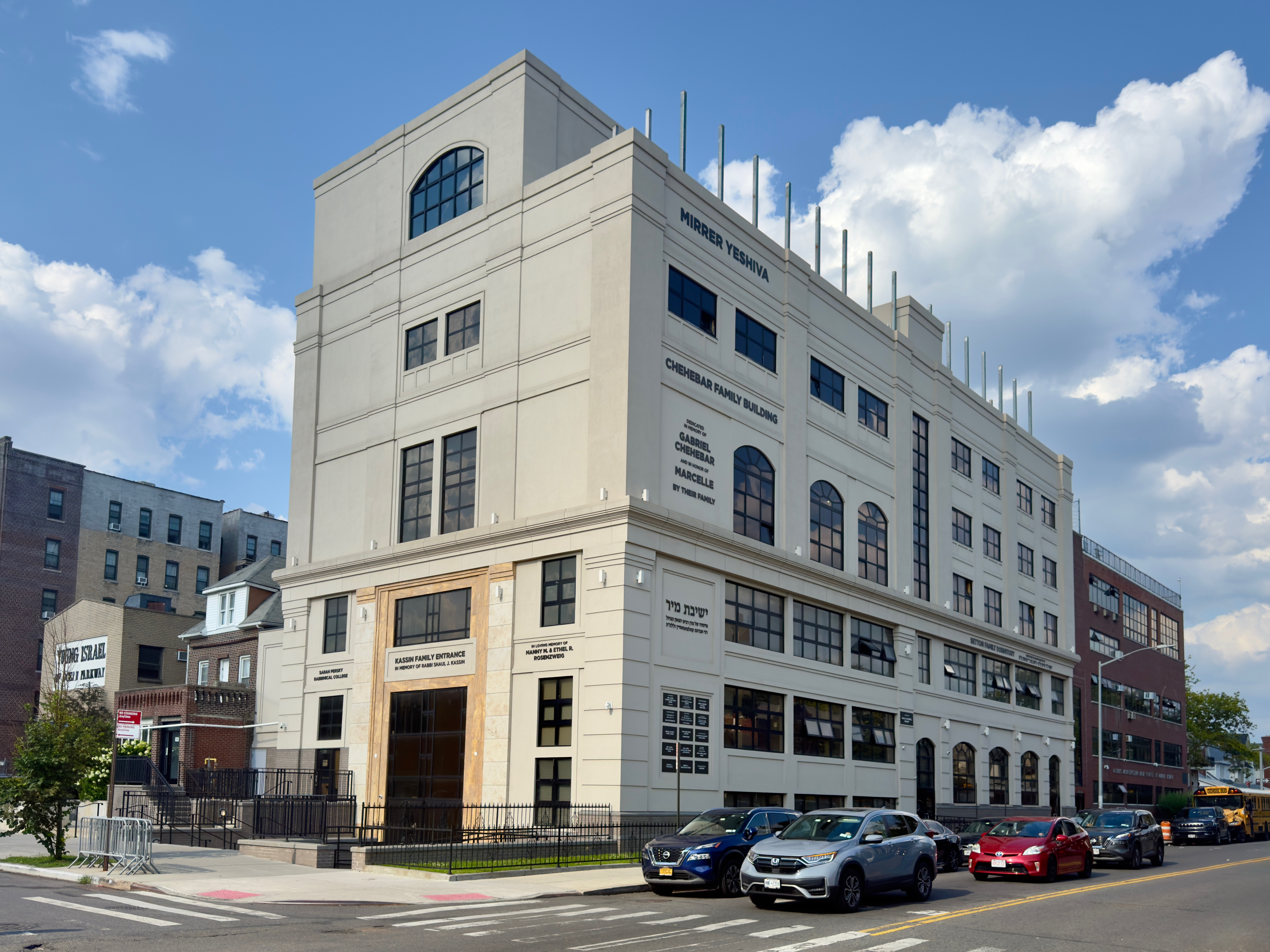
Mir yeshiva in Brooklyn

Despite the destruction of the yeshivas in Europe, many of these institutions were re-established in the United States and/or Israel during or after World War II. The Mir yeshiva, likely the only Eastern European yeshiva to continue operating during the Holocaust, divided after World War II between a location in New York, opened and led by Rabbi Avraham Kalmanowitz, and a location in Jerusalem, opened and led by Rabbi Eliezer Yehudah Finkel, who had previously served as Mir rosh yeshiva in Europe.

The Telshe yeshiva was reopened in Cleveland, Ohio, by Rabbis Eliyahu Meir Bloch and Chaim Mordechai Katz. The Ramailes Yeshiva was reestablished by Rabbi Yisrael Zev Gustman in New York and later in Israel. The Grodno yeshiva was reestablished in Queens, where it was led by Rabbi Zelig Epstein.

In Israel, the Kaminetz yeshiva was reestablished by Rabbi Moshe Bernstein and Rabbi Yaakov Moshe Leibowitz in Jerusalem, while the Ponovezh yeshiva was reestablished in Bnei Brak by Rabbi Yosef Shlomo Kahaneman. The branch of the Lomza Yeshiva that had been opened in Petach Tikvah in 1926 continued functioning after the war.
