= List of yeshivos in Europe (before World War II) =

This is a list of major Orthodox Jewish yeshivos in Europe before World War II. During the war, most of the yeshivos were forced to close, never being reopened in Europe afterwards, as Orthodox Judaism in Europe, specifically in Eastern Europe, had practically been destroyed or uprooted by the Nazis or Soviets. However, many of the students or roshei yeshiva survived the war, and reestablished their yeshivos in the United States and Israel, where Eastern European Jewry had resettled. See Yeshiva § Lithuanian yeshivas and Yeshiva § Contemporary Orthodox yeshivas.

Name	Notes
Baranovich Yeshiva	Founded in Baranavichy, Belarus, in 1906 by Rabbi Yosef Yoizel Horowitz, the yeshiva came under the leadership of Rabbi Elchonon Wasserman in 1921. The associate rosh yeshiva was Rabbi David Rappoport and the mashgiach ruchani was Rabbi Yisroel Yaakov Lubchansky. The yeshiva disbanded at the start of The Holocaust.
Brisk Yeshiva	The original "Brisker Yeshiva" in Europe may not really have been considered a "yeshiva" as it was made of a shiur (class) given by Rabbi Yitzchak Zev Soloveitchik in his home. Among his students at that time were Rabbi Yonah Karpilov, Rabbi Simcha Sheps, Rabbi Leib Gurwitz, Rabbi Ephraim Mordechai Ginzberg, Rabbi Leib Malin, and Rabbi Michel Feinstein, all originally from the Mir Yeshiva, and thus as a group, they were called the "Lions of the Mir." After World War II, Rabbi Soloveitchik opened Yeshivas Brisk in Jerusalem.
Gateshead Yeshiva	Founded in 1929 in Gateshead, England, as a branch of the Novardok Yeshiva by Rabbi Dovid Dryan, Rabbi Nachman Landynski was appointed as the first rosh yeshiva. The yeshiva operated throughout World War II and still does.
Grodno Yeshiva	Officially called Yeshiva Shaar Hatorah, it was founded in Grodno, Belarus, in 1914 or 1916, and Rabbi Shimon Shkop became rosh yeshiva in 1920, under whom it grew at attracted over 200 students. It operated until the Holocaust, and was reestablished in New York by Rabbi Zelig Epstein under the same name.
Heide Yeshiva	Founded in 1927 in Antwerp, Belgium by two Argentinean businessmen with 20 students, the yeshiva moved to the Belgian city of Heide in 1929. At some point, the student body increased to 120. Rabbi Shraga Feivel Shapiro was rosh yeshiva and Rabbi Yosef Beigun served as mashgiach ruchani. The students hailed mostly from Western European countries.
Hildesheimer Rabbinical Seminary	Founded on October 22, 1873, by Rabbi Azriel Hildesheimer in Berlin, Germany, the later roshei yeshiva were Rabbi Dovid Tzvi Hoffman, Rabbi Avraham Eliyahu Kaplan, and Rabbi Yechiel Yaakov Weinberg, who headed the institution until its forced closure in 1938.
Kaminetz Yeshiva	Officially named Yeshivas Knesses Beis Yitzchak, the yeshiva was started as a break-off from the Knesses Yisrael yeshiva of the Alter of Slabodka, and at first was situated in the same city. Rabbi Boruch Ber Leibowitz became rosh yeshiva in 1904. At the outbreak World War I, the yeshiva fled eastward to Kremenchug, Minsk, and then Vilna before settling in Kamyenyets, Belarus in 1926, hence its popular name, "Kaminetz Yeshiva." The yeshiva was disbanded during World War II and reestablished in Jerusalem in 1945.
Talmud Torah of Kelm	Founded by Rabbi Simcha Zissel Ziv in Kelmė, Lithuania, in 1860, it began as a yeshiva for young students, up to age 16. About 15 years later, he was forced to close the institution and fled to Grubin where he opened another yeshiva, returning to Kelmė in 1881, while his son ran the yeshiva. He later reopened the original Talmud Torah in Kelm, which operated until The Holocaust.
Kesser Torah Radomsk	Established c. 1926 by Rabbi Shlomo Chanoch Hakohen Rabinowicz, Kesser Torah Radomsk was a network of chassidic yeshivas throughout Poland. Beginning with eight yeshivas, the number of institutions increased drastically, and was as high as thirty six by the outbreak of World War II, with the enrollment of 4,000 students. Although the yeshiva network disbanded at the onset of World War II, it was reestablished as a kollel in Bnei Brak in the 1940s, with other branches opening up in Jerusalem, Lakewood, and Montreal.
Kobrin Yeshiva	Founded in 1923 by Rabbi Pesach Pruskin in Kobryn, Belarus, the yeshiva catered to yeshiva students living in the area who wanted to learn in a "mussar yeshiva" (institution that focuses on the study of Jewish ethics and perfecting one's character). It was also generally for younger students, between the ages of thirteen and seventeen. The yeshiva was shut down by the Red Army in 1939, as well as the city's beis yaakov, causing the rosh yeshiva tremendous heartache that led to his death.
Łomża Yeshiva	Founded in 1883 by Rabbi Leizer Shulevitz in Łomża, Poland, his sons-in-laws Rabbi Yechiel Mordechai Gordon and Rabbi Yehoshua Zelig Ruch later joined him as roshei yeshiva. In 1925/1926, a branch of the yeshiva was opened in Petach Tikvah.
Yeshiva Chachmei Lublin	Founded by Rabbi Meir Shapiro in Lublin, Poland, in 1930, it was the first in Poland with a dormitory, with enough room to accommodate 500 students. The entrance exam to the yeshiva was known to be extremely intense, with each applicant required to know several hundred pages of Talmud. In 1934, a year after Rabbi Shapiro's death, Rabbi Aryeh Tzvi Fromer became rosh yeshiva. The yeshiva was closed at the outbreak of World War II, but reestablished in Bnei Brak.
Manchester Yeshiva	Originally founded by Rabbi Tzvi Hersh Ferber and Rabbi Yehoshua Dov Silverstone in 1911 in Manchester, England, Rabbi Moshe Yitzchak Segal was appointed rosh yeshiva. Rabbi Yehuda Zev Segal, son of Rabbi Moshe Yitzchak, is famed for leading the yeshiva.
Mesivta of Warsaw	Established in 1919 by Rabbi Meir Don Plotski, Rabbi Menachem Mendel Kasher, Rabbi Menachem Ziemba, and Rabbi Meir Warshaviak, in Warsaw, Poland, it had the support of Rabbi Avraham Mordechai Alter, the Gerrer Rebbe.
Mezritch Yeshiva-Navordok	Established in 1920 in Międzyrzec Podlaski (Mezritch) in Poland, it was one of the three main branches of the Novardok Yeshiva established in Poland after the yeshiva's escape from Russia. (The other two were Białystok and Pinsk).
Mir Yeshiva	Established in Mir, Belarus, in 1815 or 1817 by Rabbi Shmuel Tikitinsky, his son Rabbi Avraham joined him at its head. Later leaders included Rabbi Yosef Dovid Mirrer, Rabbi Chaim Leib Tikitinsky, Rabbi Avraham Tikitinsky (grandson of original Rabbi Avraham), and Rabbi Elya Baruch Kammai. A son-in-law of Rabbi Kammai, Rabbi Eliezer Yehuda Finkel, became rosh yeshiva and lead it throughout both World Wars, reestablishing it in Jerusalem after World War II.
Montreux Yeshiva	Officially called Yeshivas Eitz Chaim, it was founded in 1927 in Montreux, Switzerland, and led by Rabbi Eliyahu Botchko. It catered to Jewish college students, who studied in university during the day and study Torah at the yeshiva at night. Rabbi Aharon Leib Shteinman and Rabbi Moshe Soloveitchik both taught in the yeshiva.
Nitra Yeshiva	Founded in 1907 in Nitra, Slovakia, Rabbi Shmuel Dovid Ungar took over in 1931. World War II forced the yeshiva to close, and Rabbi Shmuel Dovid escaped to nearby forests, where he died. The yeshiva was reestablished in the United States after World War II, first in Somerville, New Jersey, and then moved to Mount Kisco, New York.
Novardok Yeshiva	Established in 1896 by Rabbi Yosef Yoizel Horowitz in Navahrudak, Belarus, the yeshiva grew exponentially; Rabbi Horowitz opened eight branches of it throughout Russian Ukraine, with a total enrollment of 4,000 students. The yeshiva relocated to Białystok, Poland, in 1920, escaping the Russian Revolution, under the lead of Rabbi Avraham Yoffen. The yeshiva continued to grow, with more branches being opened throughout Poland and Lithuania. Destroyed during World War II, Rabbi Yoffen reopened it New York.
Pinsk Yeshiva-Navordok	One of the three major Novardok yeshivos and located in Pinsk, Belarus, the yeshiva was led by Rabbi Yitzchak Valdshain, Rabbi Shmuel Weintraub, and Rabbi Yaakov Yisrael Kanievsky. The yeshiva was not as mussar-oriented as the Białystok branch.
Ponevezh Yeshiva	Although a yeshiva had been established by Rabbi Yitzhak Yaakov Rabinovich in Panevėžys, Lithuania (where he served as community rabbi) in c. 1907, the yeshiva was disbanded during World War I. However, Rabbi Yosef Shlomo Kahaneman, who was appointed as the city's rabbi after Rabbi Rabinovich's death, opened a yeshiva as soon as he was appointed. This became known as the Ponevezh Yeshiva and attracted students from all over. Although the yeshiva was destroyed in The Holocaust, Rabbi Kahaneman reestablished in Bnei Brak in 1946.
Pressburg Yeshiva	Established in 1807 in Bratislava, Slovakia (then called Pressburg), by Rabbi Moshe Sofer (the Chasam Sofer), later roshei yeshiva were Rabbi Avraham Shmuel Binyamin Sofer (the Ksav Sofer), Rabbi Simcha Bunim Sofer (the Shevet Sofer), and Rabbi Akiva Sofer, who reestablished it in the Land of Israel after Hitler's invasion of Czechoslovakia.
Radin Yeshiva	Founded by Rabbi Yisrael Meir Kagan in Radun, Belarus, in 1869, others on the yeshiva faculty were Rabbi Naftoli Trop and Rabbi Moshe Landynski. The yeshiva fled eastward during World War I, returning to Radun in 1921. Rabbi Mendel Zaks and Rabbi Baruch Feivelson led the yeshiva at the outbreak of World War II.
Ramailes Yeshiva	Founded c. 1815 in Vilnius, Lithuania, it was situated for some time on property donated by a Jew named "Reb Mailes", hence its name. Among the roshei yeshiva there were Rabbi Eliezer Teitz, Rabbi Yisrael Salanter, Rabbi Meir Bassin, and Rabbi Shlomo Heiman. After World War II, Rabbi Yisrael Zev Gustman, who had taught in the yeshiva the war, reestablished it in New York City and later in Israel.
Slabodka Yeshiva	Founded in 1882 by Rabbi Nosson Tzvi Finkel in Slabodka, Lithuania (now Vilijampolė), it was a major "mussar yeshiva" (institution that focuses on the study of Jewish ethics and perfecting one's character). In 1893, Rabbi Moshe Mordechai Epstein became rosh yeshiva, and in 1924, they both emigrated to Palestine where they established a branch of the yeshiva in Chevron. Rabbi Yitzchak Isaac Sher led the yeshiva in Europe until World War II. Notable mashgichim were Rabbi Avraham Grodzinski and Rabbi Dov Tzvi Heller.
Slonim Yeshiva	Founded in 1815 in Slonim, Belarus, Rabbi Shabsi Yagel became rosh yeshiva in 1905 and was aided by his son, Rabbi Peretz Yagel. Rabbi Avraham Tzvi Litovsky served as mashgiach ruchani. Although ran like the non-Hasidic Lithuanian yeshivos, it was supported by the Slonimer Rebbes. In 1941, Rabbi Yagel fled war-torn Europe and reestablished the yeshiva in Ramat Gan.
Slutsk-Kletsk Yeshiva	Established in 1897 in Slutsk, Belarus by Rabbi Yaakov Dovid Willovsky, the Alter of Slabodka sent fourteen of his students to study in the yeshiva. Rabbi Isser Zalman Meltzer became rosh yeshiva, and later his son-in-law, Rabbi Aharon Kotler, joined him on the faculty. In 1921, under pressure the ruling Soviet Union, the yeshiva fled to Kletsk, Belarus, in Poland where Rabbi Kotler became the official head.
Telshe Yeshiva	Established in Telšiai, Lithuania, in 1873/1875, Rabbi Eliezer Gordon became rosh yeshiva in 1885. After his death in 1910, his son-in-law Rabbi Yosef Leib Bloch became rosh yeshiva, a post he held until his death in 1929, when he was succeeded by Rabbi Avrohom Yitzchok Bloch. The yeshiva, together with Rabbi Avrohom Yitzchok, was murdered in the Holocaust, yet Rabbi Eliyahu Meir Bloch and Rabbi Chaim Mordechai Katz reestablished it in Cleveland, Ohio.
Yeshiva Chachmei Tzorfas	Established in Neudorf, France, by Rabbi Ernest Weill in 1933, Rabbi Simcha Wasserman was rosh yeshiva until 1938. Rabbi Chaim Yitzchok Chaiken then became rosh yeshiva, a post he held until the yeshiva's closing in 1939; he was later captured by the Nazis. Rabbi Chaikin reopened the yeshiva in Aix-les-Bains, France, in 1945.
Yeshiva Toras Chessed (Baranovich)	Founded by Rabbi Avraham Weinberg, the Slonimer Rebbe, in 1918 in Baranavichy, Belarus, the yeshiva combined chassidic philosophy with a Lithuanian learning approach. The rosh yeshiva was Rabbi Yoshe Mordechovsky, while Rabbi Moshe Midner served there as well. After the death of Rabbi Mordechevsky, Rabbi Avraham Shmuel Hirschowitz became rosh yeshiva, and perished with his students in the Holocaust.
Yeshiva Toras Chessed (Brisk)	The yeshiva was located in Brest, Belarus (then called Brest-Litovsk), in the Russian Empire and was led by Rabbi Moshe Sokolovsky (who was known as the Imrei Moshe). Among the students there was Rabbi Aharon Leib Shteinman.
Frankfurt Yeshiva	Officially named "Torah Lehranstalt", the yeshiva was established in Frankfurt, Germany, in 1893 by Rabbi Solomon Breuer. In 1926, after Rabbi Breuer's death, his son Rabbi Yosef Breuer became rosh yeshiva. The yeshiva closed after the rise of Nazism in the country, and a short time after, Rabb Breuer escaped and settled in America where he opened Yeshiva Rabbi Samson Raphael Hirsch.
Volozhin Yeshiva	Founded in 1802 in Valozhyn, Belarus, by Rabbi Chaim Volozhiner, it was the forerunner of all Lithuanian-syle yeshivos. After his death in 1821, his son Rabbi Yitzchak of Volozhin became rosh yeshiva. Later heads were Rabbi Eliyahu Fried, Rabbi Naftali Zvi Yehuda Berlin, Rabbi Yosef Dov Soloveitchik, and Rabbi Chaim Soloveitchik. The yeshiva closed in 1892 on refusal to accept the country's imposed curriculum.
