= Shlomo Heiman =

American rabbi (1892–1944)

Rabbi Shlomo Heiman

Personal life
- Born: 1892 Paritsh, Minsk, Belarus
- Died: December 3, 1944 (aged 51–52)
- Education: Baruch Ber Lebowitz

Religious life
- Religion: Judaism
- Denomination: Orthodox

Jewish leader
- Successor: Yisroel Zev Gustman; Reuven Grozovsky
- Yeshiva: Ramailles Yeshiva; Torah Vodaath
- Position: Rosh yeshiva
- Organisation: Moetzes Gedolei HaTorah
- Yahrtzeit: 17 Kislev

Shlomo Heiman (1892–1944) known informally as "Reb Shlomo", was a rabbi, Talmudist, and rosh yeshiva. He led some of the most prominent yeshivas in Europe and the United States.

== Early life ==
Shlomo Heiman was born in Paritsh, Minsk in Belarus to Michel Heiman, a rabbi. When he was 12, he went to the yeshiva in Kaminetz to study under Baruch Ber Lebowitz, with whom he was very close. In 1918, he married the daughter of Yochanon Rudensky of Volozhin, the brother-in-law of Simcha Zelig Riger of Brisk, the dayan for the Brisker Rav.

After his marriage, Lebowitz asked Heiman to be a lecturer at the yeshiva in Kaminetz, which by this time had been wandering from Slobodka to Krementchug. It was at this time that Heiman developed a reputation for being one of Lithuania's most outstanding Talmudists. During World War I, he was briefly drafted into the Russian army. However, he still managed to review the entire tractate of Ketubot while serving on the front lines in the trenches.

After the war, Heiman began to deliver his Talmudic lectures in Ohel Torah of Baranowitz, under the leadership of Elchanan Wasserman. In 1927, at the request of Chaim Ozer Grodzensky of Vilna, Heiman became the rosh yeshiva of the Ramailles Yeshiva, a position he held until 1935.

== In the United States ==
In 1935, Heiman was invited to New York by Shraga Feivel Mendlowitz, in order for him to come and lead Mesivta Torah Vodaath. With Grodzensky's approval, Heiman accepted this position, thereby being spared the horrors of the Holocaust. During Heiman's tenure at Torah Vodaath, the yeshiva experienced a period of significant growth.

Confronted with what he considered to be the ardent secularism of America, which threatened to smother any vestige of the Haredi way of life, Heiman once remarked that one whose own children do not pursue the path of Torah can compensate by teaching Torah to the children of others.

== Death ==
Heiman died in 1944, at the age of 52. He was succeeded in the Ramailles yeshiva by Yisroel Zev Gustman, and in Torah Vodaath by Reuven Grozovsky.

== Works ==
A two-volume compendium of Heiman's Talmudic novellae, Chiddushei Rabbi Shlomo, was printed after his death (in 1966), based on his own writings, and incorporating notes of his students. It was released by Michel Yehuda Lefkowitz, one of Heiman's greatest students. It is widely used in many yeshivos, and is considered a basic text among late acharonim. A later book, Shiurei Rabbi Shlomo ('The Lectures of Rabbi Shlomo), printed from the notes of Heiman's students, contains many lectures and novellae not published in Chidushei Rabbi Shlomo. A collection of some of Heiman's original thoughts on the Bible, as well as a few of his ethical discourses has also been published.

== Notable students ==
- Shlomo Carlebach
- Alexander S. Gross
- Shraga Moshe Kalmanowitz
- Michel Yehuda Lefkowitz
- Simcha Schustal
- Meir Greenberg

== Sources ==
- In Reb Maille's Courtyard
- Bais Medrash Elyon Monsey - Bais Medrash Elyon Bnei Brak
