= Shaare Torah =

Shaare Torah or Shaarai/Shaarei Torah (Hebrew: שַׁעֲרֵי תּוֹרָה "Gates of Torah") may refer to:

== Synagogues ==
- Shaarai Torah Synagogue (Worcester, Massachusetts)

== Yeshivas (schools) ==
- Yeshiva Shaar HaTorah (Queens, New York)
- Yeshiva Shaar HaTorah, also known as Grodno Yeshiva (Grodno, Belarus)
- Yeshiva Shaarei Torah (Rockland County, New York)
- Yeshivat Shaare Torah (Brooklyn, New York)
- Shaarei Torah Boys School (affiliated with Ohr Somayach, South Africa)
