= Reuven Katz =

Rabbi Reuven Katz
- ראובן כץ

Personal life
- Born: 1880 Halshany, Russian Empire present-day Belarus
- Died: November 1963 (aged 82–83) Petah Tikvah, Israel
- Spouse: Rechiel Katz (née Maskileison)

Religious life
- Religion: Judaism
- Denomination: Haredi Judaism

Jewish leader
- Predecessor: Rabbi Yisrael Abba Citron
- Successor: Rabbi Baruch Shimon Salomon
- Synagogue: Petah Tikvah
- Yeshiva: Lomza Yeshiva
- Began: 1932
- Ended: 1963
- Main work: Degel Reuven

Rabbi Reuven Katz (Hebrew: ראובן כץ/כ"ץ; 1880–1963) was a rabbi in Russia, the United States, and Israel. Serving at first in several Russian communities and then in Bayonne, New Jersey, for the last thirty years of his life he served as chief rabbi of Petah Tikvah and as the rosh yeshiva of the city's Lomza Yeshiva.

== Early life ==
Rabbi Katz was born in Halshany (known in Yiddish as Olshan or Olshany), Russia, in 1880. As a child, he studied in the yeshiva of Rabbi Dovid Shlomo Grodzinski (father of Rabbi Chaim Ozer Grodzinski) in Iwye. A prodigious student, he was known as the "ilui (prodigy) of Olshany" and had memorized the talmudic tractates Shabbat and Bava Kamma — a feat unattained by many scholars four times his age — by the age of eleven. He soon transferred to the Mir Yeshiva where he remained for a short time before going to learn at the Radin Yeshiva of the Chafetz Chaim. He was fifteen years old at the time.

Reuven later left the Radin Yeshiva and enrolled in Yeshivas Knesses Yisrael Slabodka, the yeshiva of Rabbi Nosson Tzvi Finkel (the "Alter of Slabodka'") and Rabbi Moshe Mordechai Epstein. In 1897, when the Alter sent fourteen of the yeshiva's elite students to be the founding student body of the Slutsk Yeshiva, Reuven was among those chosen, alongside Pesach Pruskin and Eliezer Yehudah Finkel. He would remain there for several years.

=== Marriage ===
In 1903, Reuven joined the kollel of Rabbi Chaim Ozer Grodzinsky in Vilnius (Yiddish: Vilna). Soon after, he married his wife Reichel, the daughter of Rabbi Avraham Yitzchak Maskileison [HE]. The wedding was celebrated in Khislavichi where Rabbi Maskileison served as rabbi. After their marriage, the couple remained in Khislavichi where Rabbi Katz became akin to his father-in-laws assistant as rabbi. However, soon after, Rabbi Maskileison was called by the Jewish community of Stowbtsy (Yiddish: Stoybitz), a town not far from the village of Mir, to become their rabbi. Taking their offer, Rabbi Maskileison moved to Stowbsty, and there as well, his son-in-law helped him as rabbi. Both Rabbis Maskileison and Katz would engage in Torah discussions with students from the nearby Mir Yeshiva. It was also through these visits that Rabbi Katz would obtain rabbinic ordination from the Mir rosh yeshiva, Rabbi Elya Baruch Kammai [HE]. Other rabbis who came to visit his father-in-law, namely Rabbi Eliezer Rabinowitz of Minsk and Rabbi Mordechai Rosenblatt of Slonim, also gave him semikha.

== Rabbinic career ==
=== Europe and the US ===
After Rabbi Maskileison's death in 1905, Rabbi Katz became the rabbi of Seleb, a village near Minsk, where he opened a yeshiva. Four years later in 1909, he became the rabbi of Indura (Yiddish: Amdur), a village near Grodno, where he would remain for over ten years, opening a yeshiva and a gemach. During World War I, he and his wife were instrumental in Indura's aid and relief, distributing the funds from the American Joint Distribution Committee as well as organizing a Jewish militia to protect the community. At the same time, Rabbi Katz was working on his sefer, Degel Reuven, which he would publish in 1922, gaining him further recognition throughout the nation as a serious Torah scholar.

In 1923, Rabbi Katz was appointed as rabbi of Stawiski (Stavisk), a larger community than Indura, where he once again opened a yeshiva. He soon became involved in the Vaad HaYeshivos, the organization dedicated to supporting the yeshivas of Eastern Europe, founded by Rabbi Yisrael Meir Kagan, the "Chafetz Chaim." It was his activism in the organization that made the Chafetz Chaim choose him to travel to America as their overseas fundraiser in 1929. He would remain there until 1932, serving as rabbi in Bayonne, New Jersey and as the vice-president of the Agudath HaRabbanim.

=== Israel ===
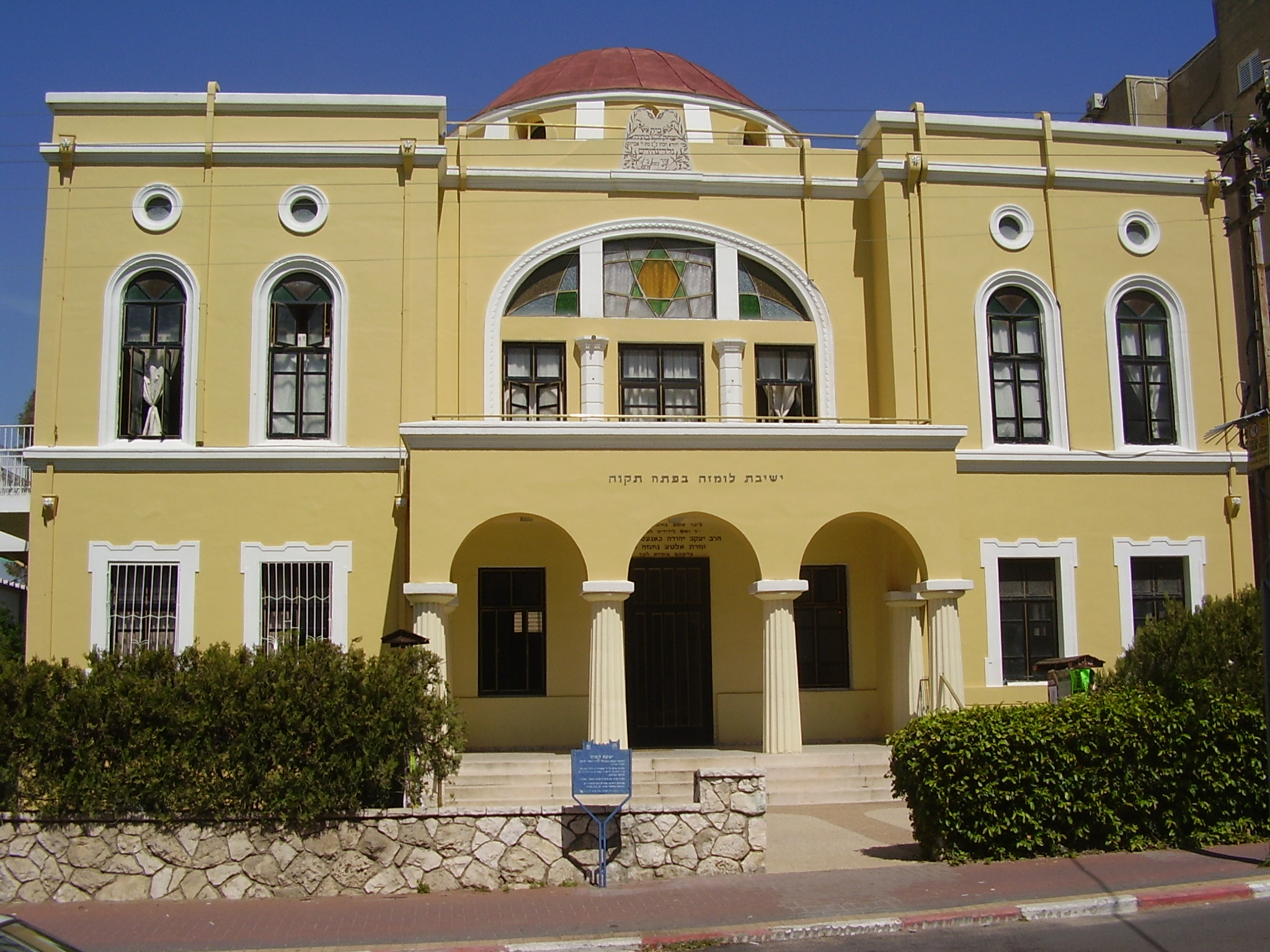
Lomza Yeshiva in Petah Tikvah, 2011

In 1932, the Jewish community of Petah Tikvah in Mandatory Palestine offered Rabbi Katz the rabbinate. Taking the opportunity to settle in Israel, he immigrated to Palestine with his family and was installed as Petah Tikvah's chief rabbi and av beit din (chief judge in a rabbinical court). It was under Rabbi Katz's leadership that Rabbi Ovadia Yosef, future chief rabbi of Israel and gadol hador, was instated as a judge on the Petah Tikvah beit din.

Also in Petah Tikvah, Rabbi Katz served as rosh yeshiva of the Lomza Yeshiva alongside Rabbi Yechiel Mordechai Gordon. The yeshiva had been established in Lomza, Poland in 1883 by Rabbi Leizer Shulevitz; his son-in-law Rabbi Gordon served as rosh yeshiva. A branch of the yeshiva was opened in Petah Tikvah in 1926, with Rabbi Gordon leading both of them. However, upon Rabbi Katz's arrival in the city in 1932, he joined the yeshiva faculty, leading and expanding it.

=== Works ===
Later volumes of Degel Reuven were published in 1940 and 1949, completing the series at three volumes. Rabbi Katz also wrote a five volume work on the Torah titled Duda'ei Reuven and a sefer titled Shaar Reuven, a collection of essays on contemporary issues, including German reparations, drafting girls and yeshiva students into the army, and celebrating Israeli independence day.

== Death ==
Rabbi Katz died in November 1963, with his funeral attended by some of Israel's leading rabbis and rebbes. His son, Rabbi Aharon Katz, served as rosh yeshiva of Lomza.
