= Shlomo Harkavy =

Polish-Jewish rabbi and Holocaust victim (1890–1942)

Rabbi Shlomo Harkavy
- Harkavy with his wife and children

Personal life
- Born: c. 1890 Grodno, Russian Empire present-day Belarus
- Died: c. 1942 Vilnius, Nazi occupied Lithuania present-day Republic of Lithuania
- Spouse: Freida Baila Harkavy (née Gringas)

Religious life
- Religion: Judaism
- Denomination: Orthodox Judaism

Jewish leader
- Position: Mashgiach ruchani
- Yeshiva: Grodno Yeshiva
- Began: c. 1920

Shlomo Harkavy (c. 1890 – c. 1942), also known as Rav Shlomo Grodner, was an Orthodox Jewish rabbi in Grodno, Poland. He served as mashgiach ruchani of the Grodno Yeshiva under Shimon Shkop, until he was murdered the Holocaust.

== Biography ==
=== Early life ===
Shlomo Harkavy was born c. 1890 in Grodno, Russian Empire (present-day Belarus). He studied at the Radin Yeshiva, where Yeruchom Levovitz served as mashgiach, and in 1908, when Levovitz was appointed mashgiach of the Mir Yeshiva, a number of his students from Radin transferred to Mir with him, Harkavy included. He stayed in the Mir for several years before going to learn in the Kelm Talmud Torah. He later married Freida Baila Gringas of Kremenchug.

=== Rabbinic career ===
In the early 1920s, Harkavy was appointed mashgiach ruchani at Yeshiva Shaar HaTorah in Grodno, where Shimon Shkop served as rosh yeshiva. As part of his role as mashgiach ruchani, he was supposed to give his students mussar (rebuke) when they did something wrong. He did this in a unique way. As opposed to confronting a student and rebuking him for a specific act, he would instead discuss that type of wrongdoing with somebody else, in earshot of the student.

=== The Holocaust ===
At the outbreak of World War II and the Soviet takeover of Poland, many yeshivas fled to Vilna, the Grodno Yeshiva included. While the rosh yeshiva Shkop was not up to journey, Harkavy joined his students and escaped to Vilna. After the Nazi invasion of Lithuania, the Jews of Vilna were rounded up into two ghettos, where many Jews were killed or deported to Nazi concentration camps; both ghettos were later liquidated by the Nazis. Harkavy was murdered around that time. He was the last mashgiach of the Grodno Yeshiva in Europe.
