= Dov Koppelman =

Swiss rabbi (1909–2011)

Yitzchok Dov Koppelman (April 30, 1909 – June 17, 2011) was born in Vasilishki, Belarus. He was the head of the 1951-founded Lucerne Yeshiva in Switzerland for nearly 50 years from 1963.

A year before he died, a report about his visit from Switzerland to Melbourne, Australia was titled "World's oldest rabbi visits Oz". While the main purpose of his trip was to raise additional funds for his yeshiva, he gave a number of public lectures: at an elementary school, a high school, a Kollel, and a major shul.

== Career ==
Koppelman was "a leading disciple of Rabbi Shimon Shkop," having been at the latter's yeshiva for 18 years.

Prior to World War II he ran a yeshiva; after the war he established two more: one in Europe, etz chaim from 1946 to 1957 in kapellen belgium;another in Brooklyn, the latter "named after the well known sefer by the same name written by R' Shimon Shkop."shaarei yoisher.

His work in Switzerland began in 1963. The Yeshiva was based in Obernau in the canton of Lucerne (municipality of Kriens), where Rabbi Koppelman worked for 48 years and taught and inspired thousands of students from all over the world, including "Western Europe.. the United Kingdom, .. the United States of America, Canada, Eretz Yisroel and even Australia." as well as from Central and South America.

== End of life ==
He was referred to as Zekan Roshei HaYeshivos (the world’s senior Rosh HaYeshiva), and lived to the age of 106.

Koppelman's health permitted a trip from Switzerland to Australia the prior June. After being "hospitalized for" the prior "few weeks" he died. His body was transferred to Jerusalem and solemnly buried there in the presence of thousands of people.

It was noted that Koppelman's death was within the same two weeks that included those of Rabbi Michel Yehuda Lefkowitz and Rabbi Chaim Stein.
