= Michoel Fisher =

Dayan Michoel Fisher (c. 1910 – 7 January 2004) was an Orthodox rabbi, orator and Talmudic scholar, with complete mental mastery of the entire Talmud.

== Early years ==
Born sometime between 1908 and 1912; he was always unsure of his date of birth; in Grodno, then Imperial Russia, Dayan Fisher was the seventh of fourteen children born to the professional fundraiser of the Grodno yeshiva. He claimed to have shared a bench in the Grodno Cheder with Meyer Lansky.

He was a pupil of the renowned Rabbi Shimon Shkop in Grodno yeshiva, as well as Rabbi Boruch Ber Leibowitz in Kamenetz yeshiva. Fisher went to Radin yeshiva in his late teens, serving the world-famous Chofez Chaim as carer and personal assistant and was one of a select group who prayed daily in his house. He also studied in Białystok yeshiva and under Rabbi Chaim Ozer Grodzinski of Vilna. In 1930 Fisher went to Mir yeshiva, staying for six years.

== Rabbinical career ==
Fisher was appointed Rabbi of a small shul in Warsaw in 1936, where he rapidly acquired a name as an impressive speaker in the "Litvishe" (Lithuanian Jewish) style. He married Sarah Miriam Wloski of Łomża in June 1937, whose father worked as a Shochet in England, following her to England the same year through the rescue efforts of Rabbi Dr Solomon Schonfeld. Fisher thus escaped the impending Holocaust, yet his entire family was wiped out except for a younger brother who escaped from the Warsaw Ghetto and joined the partisans.

When Fisher arrived in England, the Federation of Synagogues, with some 68 affiliated synagogues, was the largest synagogal body in the United Kingdom, serving some 50,000 souls. He became Rabbi of the Alie Street Federation synagogue in London's East End in 1939. In 1940, he took over as Rabbi of Yavne synagogue in Hackney, which he led until 1970.

In 1966, Fisher formed the Federation Beth Din, which he built up into a significant and respected force. As a result of his numerous communal activities and in recognition of his Talmudic scholarship, Fisher became the "Rav Rashi" of the Federation of Synagogues in 1969 following Rabbi Dr Eliezer Kirzner. Upon his retirement in 1980, he retained the post with the addition of the appellation "emeritus".

Fisher moved with his wife to Edgware in the 1970s, where they became well-known and popular figures. His wife's death in 1987 was a severe blow, yet he continued to speak and teach for the next decade and a half, well into his 90s.

Serving as the Chairman of the Federation of Synagogues Rabbinate for many years, Fisher's relationship with Federation lay leaders was not always happy. He felt that he and his rabbinic colleagues were often mistreated and undervalued by their constituents, who didn't recognise the tremendous talent and knowledge of their Rabbis.

Although unbending in his firm old-world Orthodoxy, he was always courteous to those with different views and practices. An ardent religious supporter of Israel, he was a senior figure in UK Mizrachi for many years, and visited Israel often. Fisher died on 7 January 2004 in London, survived by two daughters, three grandchildren and one great-granddaughter. One son-in-law is Elkan Levy, ex-president of the United Synagogue.

== Scholarship and intellect ==
Fisher was an intellectually brilliant figure, possessing a photographic memory and an encyclopaedic knowledge of the Talmud and other Rabbinic texts. He knew the 7000 pages of the Talmud by heart, word for word, and could provide the page, line and exact wording for any Talmudic reference instantly. He was also an inspiring orator, erudite, humorous, thought provoking and possessing great wit.

In later life, Fisher remarked that in retrospect, he was not 'cut out' for the Rabbinate, but rather as a teacher, scholar and educator. He liked nothing better than teaching and learning Talmud. In a eulogy, Fisher was described by Dayan Lichtenstein, current head of the Federation Beth Din, as a great Talmudic scholar. "He studied the Torah every time as if he were learning it for the first time... The Torah not only brought him his great status but also gave him his youthfulness". Chief Rabbi Sir Jonathan Sacks said in tribute, "Dayan Michoel Fisher was one of the great links between Anglo-Jewry and the world of Lithuanian Jewish piety".

Fisher published Ateres Mordechai, a commentary to Pirkei Avos in London in 1953.
