= Harkavy =

Harkavy is a Jewish surname. Variants in Russian language include Garkavy/Garkavyi (ru:Гаркавый), ru:Гарькавый) and Gorkavy (ru:Горькавый). The Dictionary of American Family Names suggests that the surname is derived from the Belarusian word 'harkavyj' for a person who pronounces uvular R (see wikt:burr, Etymology 2) instead of voiced alveolar trill R (thus hinting at Jewish accent) In fact a derogatory epithet for a Jew is "гаркавы" (Russian "картавый"), or "burry". Another meaning of the Belarusian word "гаркавы" is "slightly bitter" (in taste).

Notable people with the surname include:

- Abraham Harkavy (1839–1919), Russian Jewish historian and orientalist
- Alexander Harkavy (1863–1939), Russian Jewish writer and lexicographer, known for his Jewish-English Dictionary
- Harold Harkavy (1915–1965), American bridge player
- Ilya Garkavyi (1888–1937), Soviet Red Army commander
- Juliana Harkavy (born 1985), American Jewish actress
- Yehoshafat Harkabi (1921–1994), head of Israeli Military Intelligence Directorate (1955-59), military historian, and recipient of the first Israel Prize for political science (1993)
- Shlomo Harkavy (c. 1870 – c. 1942), Orthodox rabbi in Belarus

== See also ==
- Harkavy, a gang-controlled neighborhood in Michael Chabon's The Yiddish Policemen's Union
- Harkusha, similar etymology
