= Harkusha =

Harkusha or Garkusha (Cyrillic: Гаркуша) is a gender-neutral Slavic surname derived from the nickname for a person who has problems pronouncing the sound "R". Notable people with the surname include:

- Diana Harkusha (born 1994), Ukrainian lawyer and actress
- Oleg Garkusha (born 1961), Soviet and Russian musician, singer, and showman
- Roman Harkusha (born 1984), Belarusian football player

== See also ==
- Harkavy, similar etymology
