= Eliyahu Botchko =

Rabbi Yerachmiel Eliyahu Botchko רב ירחמיאל אליהו בוצ'קו
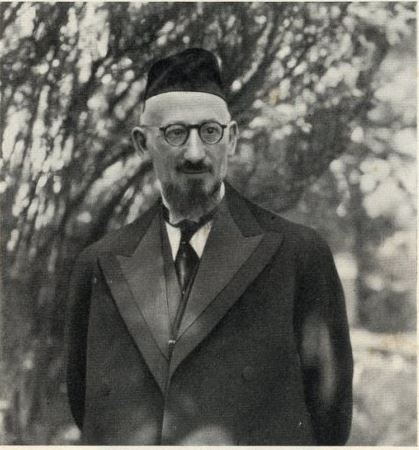

Personal life
- Born: January 28, 1888 Chorzele, Russian Empire present-day Poland
- Died: January 12, 1956 (aged 67) Ireland
- Buried: Sanhedria Cemetery, Jerusalem

Religious life
- Religion: Judaism
- Denomination: Orthodox Judaism

Jewish leader
- Successor: Rabbi Moshe Botchko
- Yeshiva: Yeshivas Eitz Chaim
- Position: Rosh yeshiva
- Began: 1927
- Ended: 1956
- Yahrtzeit: 18 Teves, 5716 כ"ח בטבת ה'תשט"ז
- Residence: Montreux, Switzerland

Rabbi Yerachmiel Eliyahu Botchko was an Orthodox Jewish rabbi in Switzerland. He was the founder and rosh yeshiva of Yeshivas Eitz Chaim in Montreux, Switzerland.

== Early life ==
Rabbi Botchko was born on January 28, 1888, in Chorzele, Russia (currently Poland). At the relatively young age of 12, his parents sent him to the Lomza Yeshiva for an advanced Torah education. Shortly after his bar mitzvah, his father died, and his mother a short time later. At some point, Eliyahu switched to the Novardok Yeshiva where he grew significantly in his Torah studies. He married Rivka Sternbuch, daughter of Rabbi Naftali Sternbuch of Basel and sister-in-law of Recha Sternbuch. The couple settled in Basel.

== Rabbinic career ==
The couple later resettled in Montreux in the Swiss Alps after Rivka fell ill and the doctors suggested relocation to the mountains. There, in the spring of 1927, Rabbi Botchko opened Yeshivas Eitz Chaim (commonly referred to as the "Montreux Yeshiva") under the instructions of his Rabbi, the Saba of Novardok. Rabbi Yosef Leib Bloch of the Telshe Yeshiva sent five of his students to Montreux, who in addition to four local Swiss boys, made up the yeshiva. As opposed to the yeshivas in Eastern Europe where the students studied Torah the entire day, Rabbi Botchko's yeshiva was for Jewish students who went to college during the day and came only at night. The yeshiva's fame grew and it attracted students from all over Europe, and was one of the only European yeshivas to continue functioning during World War II. Teachers in the yeshiva would include Rabbis Aharon Leib Shteinman, Moshe Soloveitchik, and Aryeh Leib Glickson (the latter two were grandchildren of Rabbi Chaim Soloveitchik).

== Death and legacy ==
In January 1956, the yeshiva organized an alumni reunion in the United States, with the participation of Rabbi Botchko. En route to America, he stopped in Ireland where he suffered a sudden heart attack and died; his coffin was flown to Israel for burial, and his son, Rabbi Moshe Botchko, became rosh yeshiva. In 1985, the yeshiva moved to Jerusalem and in 1996, to the Kokhav Ya'akov settlement in the West Bank. The yeshiva's name was changed to "Yeshivat Heichal Eliyahu", named after its founder, Rabbi Eliyahu Botchko, and is affiliated with the Hesder yeshiva program.

== Gallery ==
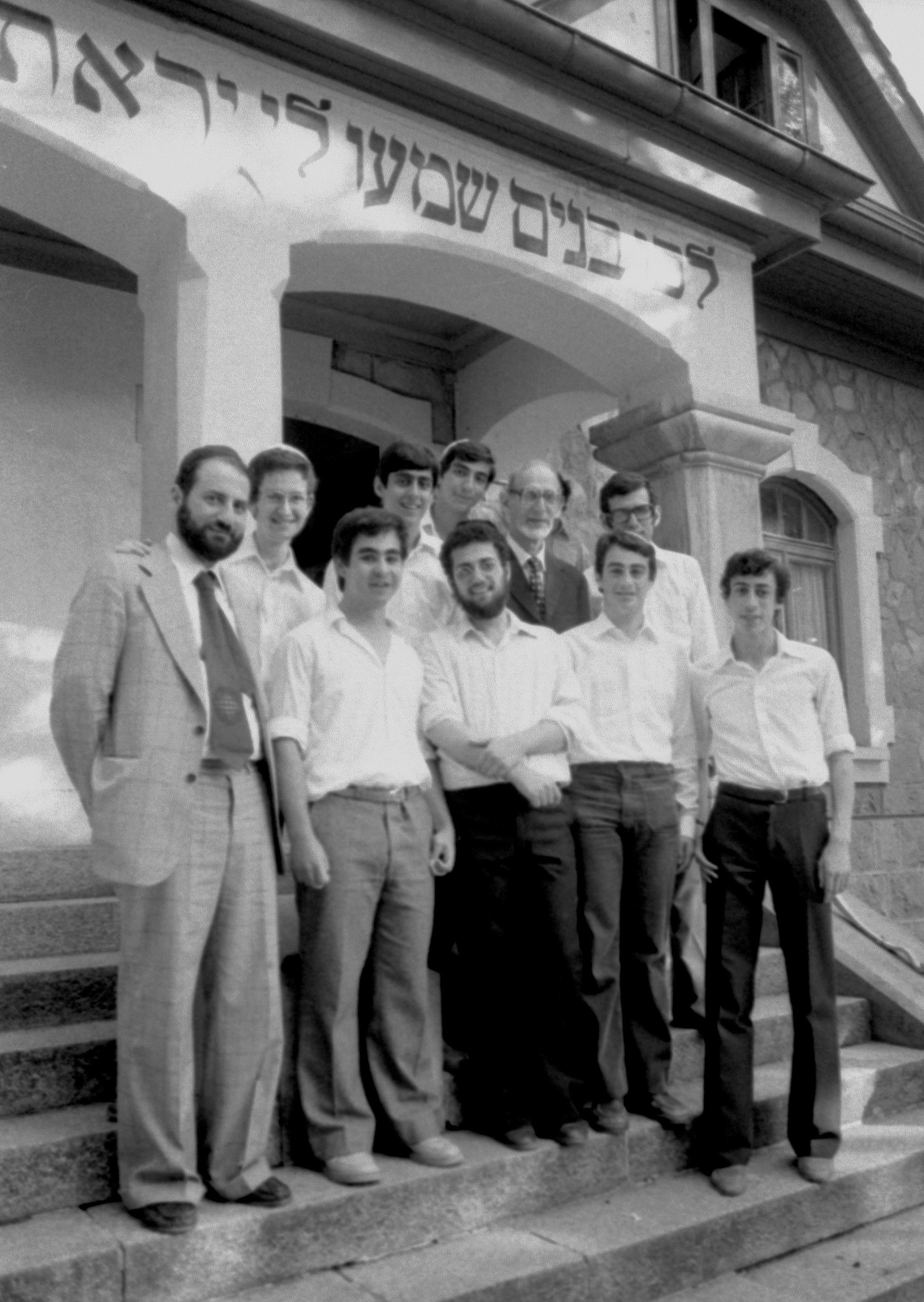
Yeshivas Eitz Chaim, 1979

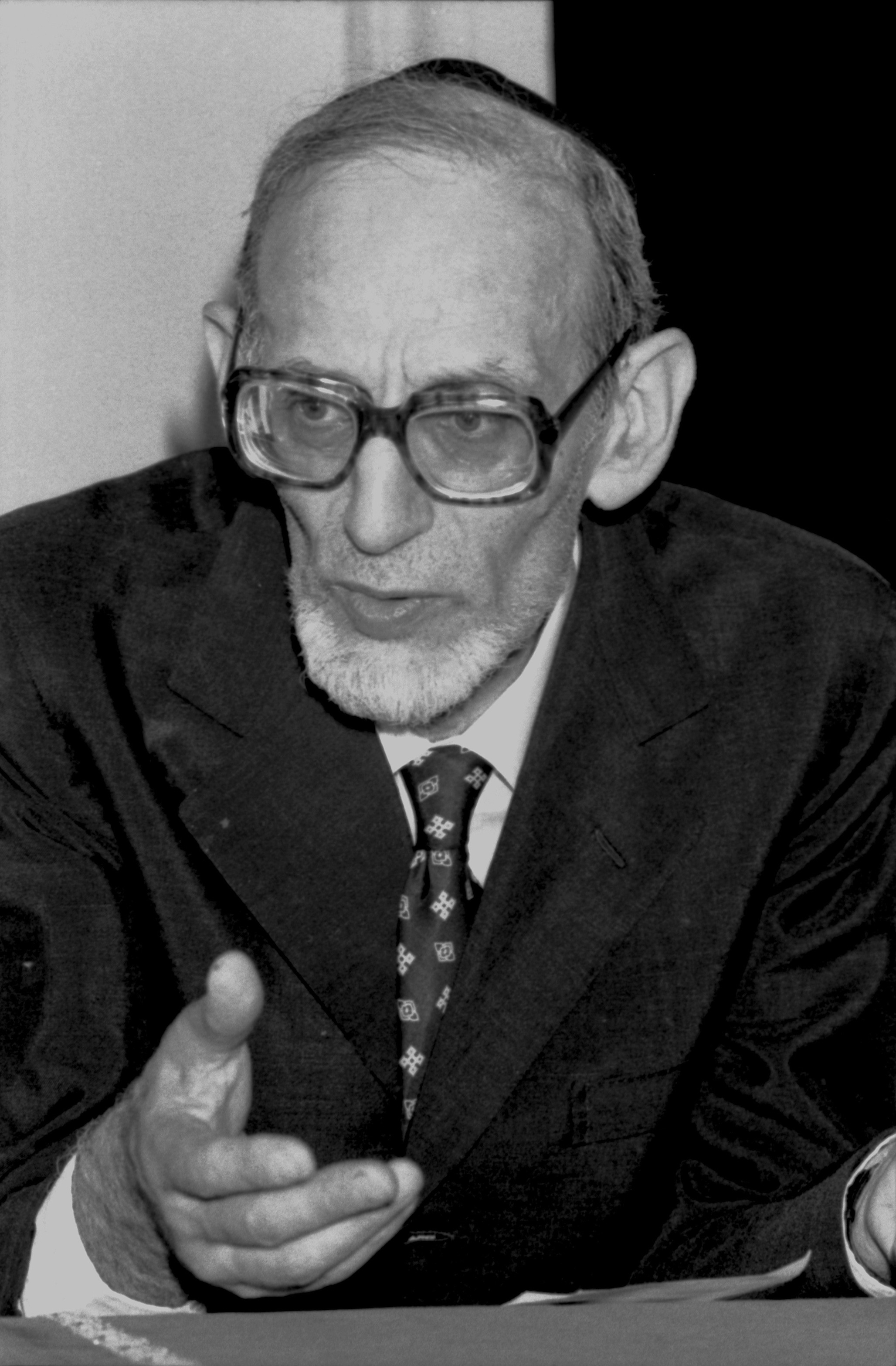
His son and successor, Rabbi Moshe Botchko
