= Michel Yehuda Lefkowitz =

Israeli rabbi

Rabbi Michel Yehuda Lefkowitz הרב מיכל יהודה לפקוביץ
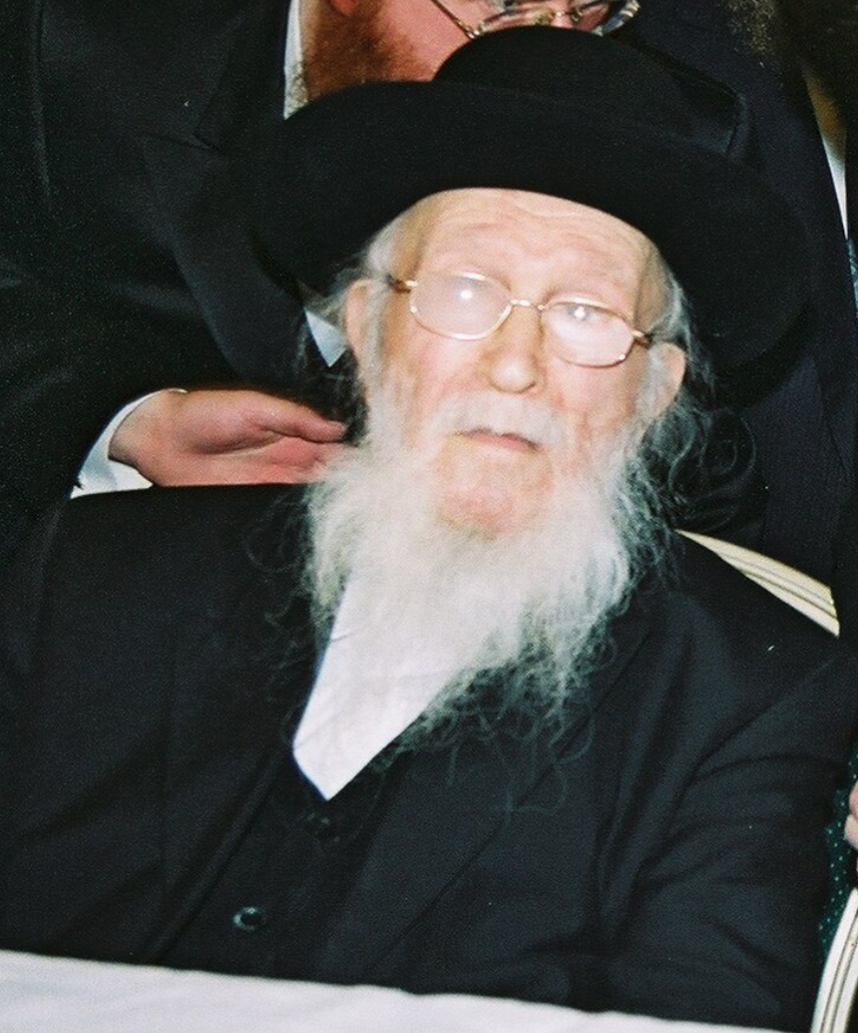
- Rav Lefkowitz in 2004

Personal life
- Born: Michel Yehuda Lefkowitz; 1913 Volozhin
- Died: 27 June 2011 (aged 97–98) Jerusalem
- Buried: 28 June 2011, Bnei Brak
- Spouse: Chava Esther Gershonowitz
- Children: Moshe Dovid; Avraham Yitzchak daughter (died in infancy)
- Parent(s): Moshe Dovid and Chaya Lefkowitz
- Education: Hebron Yeshiva
- Occupation: Rosh yeshiva, maggid shiur

Religious life
- Religion: Judaism
- Denomination: Haredi

Jewish leader
- Position: Rosh yeshiva
- Yeshiva: Yeshivas Ponovezh L’Tzeirim
- Began: 1954
- Ended: 2010
- Other: Maggid shiur, Yeshivas Tiferes Tzion, 1940–2011
- Residence: Bnei Brak

Rabbi Michel Yehuda Lefkowitz (Hebrew: הרב מיכל יהודה לפקוביץ; 1913 – 27 June 2011) was an Israeli Haredi Torah leader and rosh yeshiva in Bnei Brak for over 70 years. He was a maggid shiur at Yeshivas Tiferes Tzion from 1940 to 2011 and rosh yeshiva of Yeshivas Ponovezh L’Tzeirim from 1954 to 2009, raising thousands of students. He was a member of the Moetzes Gedolei HaTorah of Degel HaTorah, a member of Mifal HaShas, and nasi (president) of the Acheinu kiruv organization, and played a leading role in the fight for Torah-true education in yeshivas and Talmud Torahs in Israel. In addition to his own Torah works, he published the teachings of his rebbi, Rabbi Shlomo Heiman, in the two-volume Chiddushei Shlomo.

== Early life ==
He was born in Valozhyn, Russian Empire (now Belarus) in 1913 to Moshe Dovid and Chaya Lefkowitz. This was the second marriage for both his parents. His father was almost 80 years old when he was born. The family lived in great poverty. Moshe Dovid had children from a previous marriage who lived in America; they would send their father three rubles (the equivalent of one dollar) each month. Lefkowitz would use two of the rubles to pay for a melamed for Michel Yehuda, and the other ruble to support the family. Chaya Lefkowitz's son and daughter from a previous marriage lived in Palestine.

At age 12 Michel Yehuda began learning in a yeshiva ketana (the equivalent of high school) in the town of Rakov, boarding with his uncle. He marked his bar mitzvah there in 1929 without his parents. A few years later, he journeyed to Vilna in order to be treated by an eye specialist, and joined the yeshiva of Rameilles under Heiman. While there, in 1932, his father died.

In 1936 Lefkowitz and his mother immigrated to British Mandate Palestine using certificates obtained by her son Aryeh Leib. At the same time, Heiman immigrated to America, where he became rosh yeshiva of Yeshiva Torah Vodaath. Heiman and Rabbi Chaim Ozer Grodzinski gave Lefkowitz letters of recommendation to show the roshei yeshiva of the Hebron Yeshiva, in which they wrote, "He will enlighten the Torah world". At the Hebron Yeshiva, which had relocated to Jerusalem after the 1929 Hebron massacre, Lefkowitz became very close to Rabbi Leib Chasman. Heiman also referred Lefkowitz to Rabbi Isser Zalman Meltzer, rosh yeshiva of Etz Chaim Yeshiva, and he became close to him as well.

Lefkowitz also developed a close relationship with the Chazon Ish in Bnei Brak. The Chazon Ish suggested for him a shidduch with Chava Esther Gershonowitz, daughter of Rabbi Avraham Gershonowitz, Rav of Zabinka and rosh yeshiva of Tiferes Tzion of Bnei Brak. At Lefkowitz's wedding on Lag B'Omer 1940, the Chazon Ish walked him to his chupah.

== Torah disseminator ==
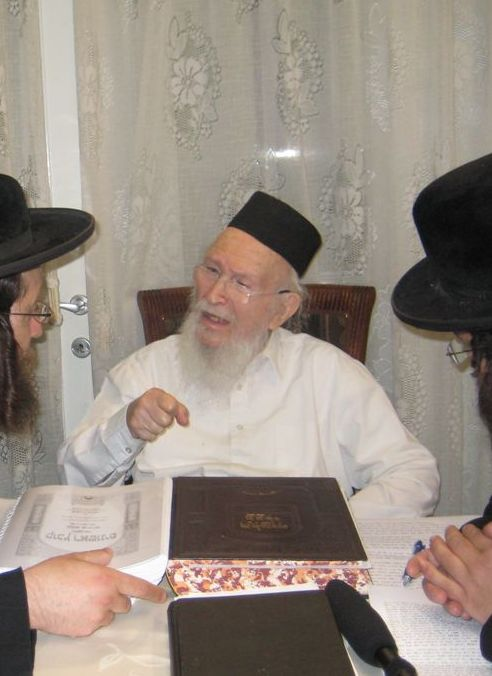
Rabbi Michel Yehuda Lefkowitz in 2007

After his wedding, Lefkowitz began learning in Kollel Toras Eretz Yisrael in Petah Tikva. He also began giving regular shiurim (Torah lectures) in his father-in-law's yeshiva, Tiferes Tzion, a position he held until his final days more than 70 years later. He began giving a nightly shiur to baalebatim (working men) in the Chazon Ish's home in 1953; he also continued this shiur until his final days.

In Cheshvan 1954 the Ponovezher Rav, Rabbi Yosef Shlomo Kahaneman, opened a yeshiva ketanah in the Ponovezh yeshiva and invited Lefkowitz to serve as rosh yeshiva together with Rabbi Aharon Leib Shteinman. Lefkowitz raised thousands of students, and even taught the grandchildren of his original students. In the first and second years of the yeshiva ketana, Rabbi Nissim Karelitz and Rabbi Chaim Kanievsky were his students. He also taught Rabbi Meir Tzvi Bergman, today rosh yeshiva of Yeshiva HaRashbi and a son-in-law of Rabbi Elazar Shach. Lefkowitz gave a regular daily shiur at the yeshiva ketana until his health declined in summer 2009; he continued to give shiurim and shmuessen (mussar talks) there until his final days.

In the late 1990s, Lefkowitz started a kollel for the study of Tohorot, together with an evening kollel for an in-depth study of this topic. Branches of the Kollel were opened in Bnei Brak, Jerusalem, Haifa, Ofakim, Kiryat Sefer, Petah Tikva, and other locations.

== Leadership ==
Lefkowitz was a member of the Moetzes Gedolei HaTorah of Degel HaTorah, a member of Mifal HaShas, and nasi (president) of the Acheinu kiruv organization, and played a leading role in the fight for Torah-true education in yeshivas and Talmud Torahs in Israel, appearing at rallies and signing on many kol korei (proclamations).

== Chazon Ish etrog ==
Lefkowitz was instrumental in saving the lineage of a variety of Balady Citron called "the Chazon Ish etrog", which was certified as kosher for the mitzvah of etrog by the Chazon Ish. After one Sukkot, the Chazon Ish handed Lefkowitz a packet of seeds taken from the etrog he had used for the festival and instructed him to plant them in his yard. Lefkowitz, who had no agricultural experience, followed his mentor's instructions to plant and water it, and the tree grew and bore fruit. Every year the Chazon Ish came to select his etrog for the holiday from the tree, as did his brother-in-law, the Steipler Gaon, and other Gedolei Yisrael. Lefkowitz also allowed etrog growers to take cuttings from the tree to grow entire orchards of etrogim certified as kosher (mehudar) by the Chazon Ish. The tree itself is unusual, as etrog trees normally grow from the tree itself or from a cutting, not from seeds, and those planted from seeds usually don't yield fruit. Moreover, etrog trees typically produce for five to seven years, whereas Lefkowitz's tree produced hundreds of clean, high-quality etrogim for over half a century. In a 2016 interview, Rebbetzin Leah Elyashiv, the daughter of Lefkowitz, noted that the original tree is still growing in the backyard, surrounded by second-, third-, and fourth-generation offshoots.

== Final days and funeral ==
In March 2011, Lefkowitz's health declined, and he began to suffer from various ailments. In June, he relocated to the Katamon neighborhood of Jerusalem to rest. He lost consciousness on Shabbat afternoon, 25 June, and was rushed to Shaare Zedek Medical Center, where he died on Monday evening, 27 June (26 Sivan 5771). His Hebrew date of death was the 75th yahrtzeit of his father-in-law.

An estimated 100,000 people attended his funeral in Bnei Brak on Tuesday morning, 28 June, including Gedolei Yisrael, rabbis, rebbes, roshei yeshiva, and thousands of Lefkowitz's students from throughout the decades. In the oppressive heat, chesed organizations handed out thousands of bottles of water, and hundreds of volunteers and 15 ambulances were on hand. Dozens of people fainted and some had to be taken to hospital.

The coffin was not taken inside the Ponovezh yeshiva, per Lefkowitz's will. His grandson, Rabbi Yosef Shlomo Korlansky, read out parts of his will, and his two sons, Rabbi Moshe Dovid Lefkowitz and Rabbi Avraham Yitzchak Lefkowitz, delivered eulogies. The funeral then proceeded to the Bnei Brak cemetery, where Lefkowitz was buried in the Ponovezh section.

== Works ==
- Chiddushei Rabbi Shlomo (2 vol.)
- Minchas Yehuda on Tractates Bava Kama, Bava Metzia, Bava Basra, Kiddushin, Gittin, Kodshim, Zeraim
- Darkhei Chaim
- Imrei Daas
- Tzava'as Rabbeinu Hagadol (Last Will and Testament)
- Emek Ha'shaar- a commentary on Sefer Hamekach V'hamemkar of Hai Goan
