= Vaad HaYeshivos =

Pre-World War Two Jewish organization

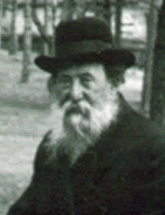
- Rabbi Chaim Ozer Grodzinski
- Company type: Jewish Organization
- Founded: 1924 in Grodno, Belarus
- Founder: Rabbi Yisrael Meir Kagan
- Defunct: c. 1940
- Fate: Defunct
- Headquarters: Vilnius, Lithuania
- Areas served: Lithuania and Belarus
- Key people: Rabbi Chaim Ozer Grodzinski
- Revenue: 1,430,950 new shekel (2024)
- Number of employees: 12 (2024)

The Vaad HaYeshivos (Hebrew: ועד הישיבות, lit. 'Council of Yeshivas') was an organization in Eastern Europe that helped financially support the Lithuanian-style yeshivos (institutions of Torah study) in Eastern Europe. Founded by Rabbi Yisroel Meir Kagan (the Chofetz Chaim) in 1924, it was led by Rabbi Chaim Ozer Grodzinski.

== History ==
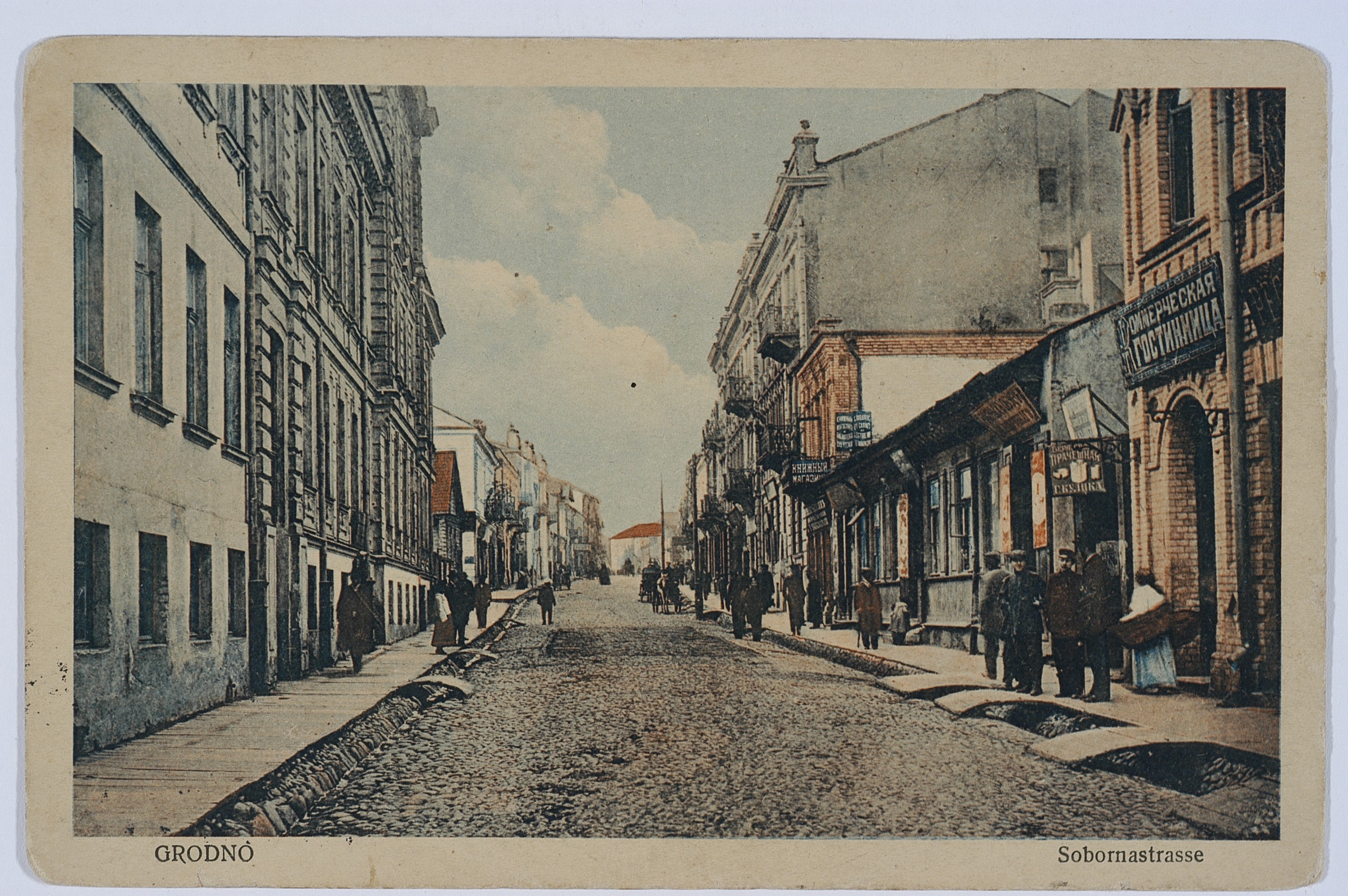
Grodno in the early 20th century

The organization was introduced at a meeting of rabbis in Grodno that had been organized by Rabbi Chaim Ozer Grodzinski in 1924. Rabbi Grodzinski was appointed head of the organization, which was based in Vilna, and remained active at this post for the rest of his life. Its goal was to help finance the yeshivos in Lithuania and Poland (most of which would currently be in Belarus), as well as provide for needy students and represent the interests of the yeshivos.

During World War II, a major issue arose. Escaping the Communist Soviets that had taken over eastern Poland, many yeshivos traveled to Vilna, which would come under the Republic of Lithuania's government. However, in the center of World War II, the Vaad HaYeshivos understood that the war would soon reach Lithuania and the yeshiva students had to escape Europe. They, therefore, arranged Polish passports and visas to the West Indies and Japan for all the students, planning for the students to leave Europe via the Trans-Siberian Railway. For many, these efforts were for naught, as train tickets cost an exorbitant amount of money. While many refugees, including the Mir Yeshiva, got the money for tickets and were saved from the Holocaust, most of the students were forced to remain in Lithuania.

== See also ==
- List of yeshivos in Europe (before World War II)
- Yeshivas in World War II
