= Grubin =

Grubin, feminine: Grubina is a Slavic surname. Notable people with the surname include:

- Benjamin Grubin, singer from Hockey (band)
- David Grubin (born 1944), American documentary filmmaker
- Gordana Grubin, Serbian professional basketball player

== Fictional characters ==
- Aleksandr Grubin from the fictional town of Veliky Guslyar
