= Grodno Yeshiva =

Yeshiva in Belarus

Yeshiva Shaar HaTorah
- ישיבה שער התורה
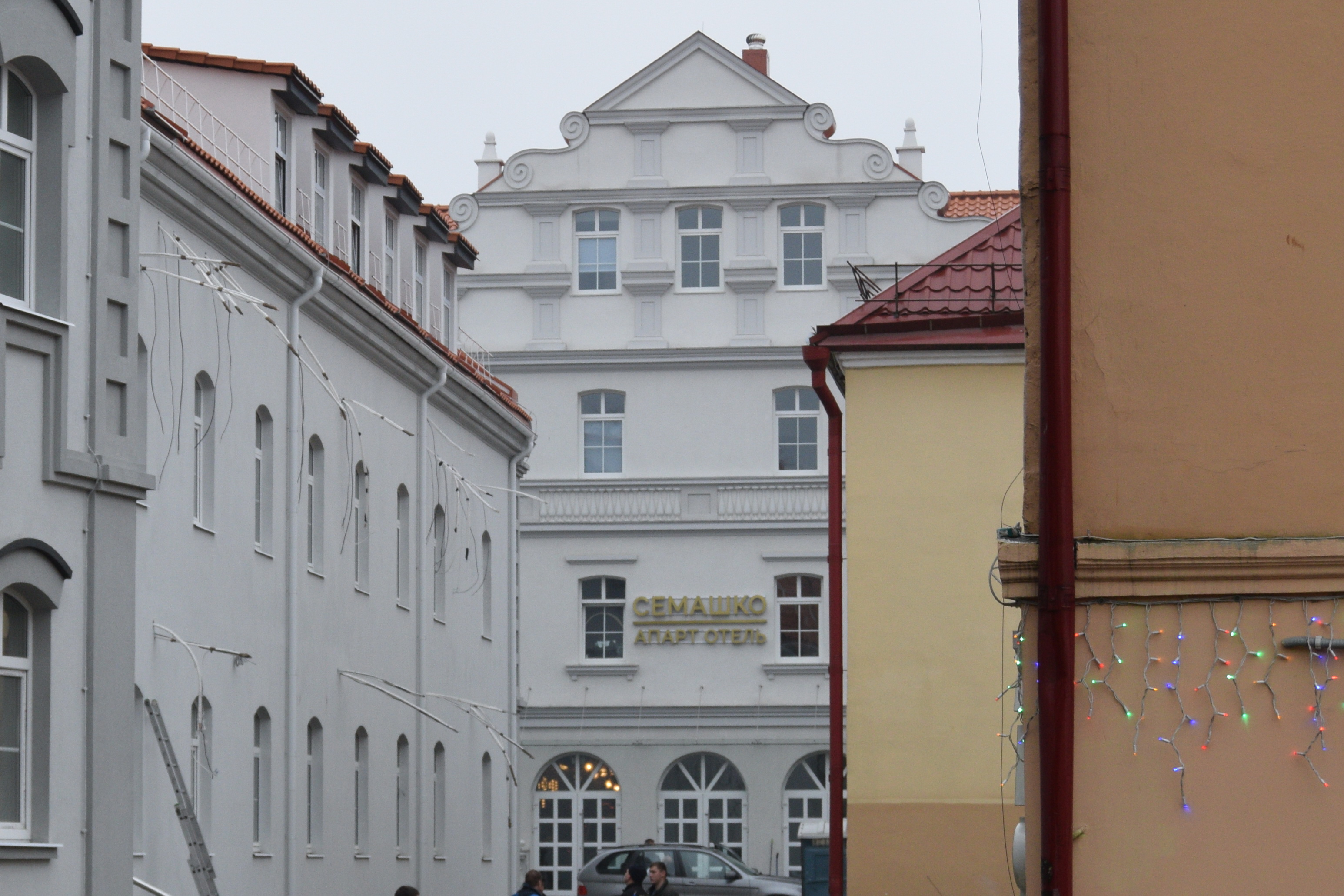
- The yeshiva's building today, currently a hotel
- Grodno; Belarus

Information
- Religious affiliation: Orthodox Judaism
- Established: 1914 or 1916
- Closed: 1939
- Dean: Shimon Shkop
- Enrollment: 200+ students

Yeshiva Shaar HaTorah – Grodna, often referred to as the Grodna Yeshiva or simply as Grodna, was an Orthodox Jewish yeshiva in the Belarusian city of Grodno, then under Russian rule. Founded during World War I, Shimon Shkop became rosh yeshiva (dean) in 1920.

== History ==
=== Early years ===
The yeshiva was founded in either 1914 or 1916, formed with the enrollment of yeshiva students who were displaced from the ongoing World War I. Refael Alter Shmuelevitz (father of Rabbi Chaim Shmuelevitz), was appointed as rosh yeshiva (dean), and Yosef Leib Nenedik was the yeshiva's first mashgiach ruchani (spiritual supervisor).

=== Shimon Shkop ===
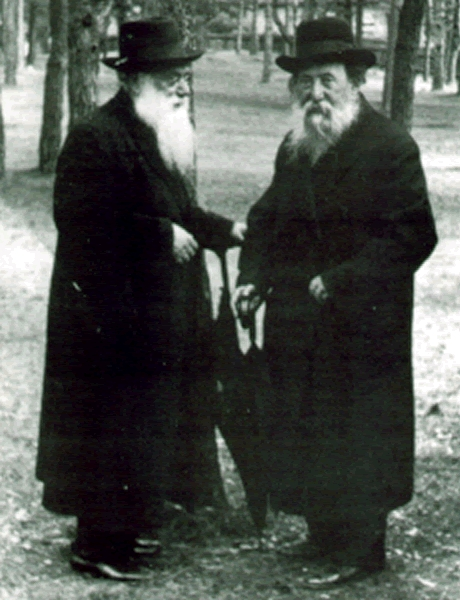
Shimon Shkop (left) with Chaim Ozer Grodzenski

In 1920, at the urging of Yosef Shlomo Kahaneman, as well as the encouragement of Yisrael Meir Kagan (the Chofetz Chaim) and Chaim Ozer Grodzenski, Shimon Shkop became rosh yeshiva. Shlomo Harkavy became mashgiach around this time. As part of his job, he was supposed to give students mussar (rebuke) when they did something wrong. However, as opposed to directly approaching a student and rebuking him for a specific act, he would simply talk about that type of wrongdoing with another person while in earshot of the student. Shraga Feivel Hindis, a son-in-law of Shkop, assisted his father-in-law in running the yeshiva.

The hasmadah (diligence in Torah study) in the yeshiva was well known, with the average student studying fifteen hours each day. The most diligent students, called the "Lions of Grodno" (Yiddish: Ariyos fun Grodno) were capable of learning for eighteen hours a day. Among the "lions" were Moshe Zaretsky and Yisrael Zev Gustman, future rosh yeshiva in Ramailes. The two both used stay in the beis medrash (Torah study hall) for months, immersed in Torah learning. The yeshiva schedule was rigorous, with shacharis at 7 a.m. and night seder (learning session) finishing at 1 a.m.

The yeshiva was divided into two schools: the yeshiva ketana for younger students and the yeshiva gedolah for older ones. Chaim Shmuelevitz gave a shiur (class) in the yeshiva ketana. Shkop gave shiur for the yeshiva gedolah which would sometimes last over two hours long. Under his leadership, the yeshiva grew to over 200 students.

=== Disbandment and legacy ===
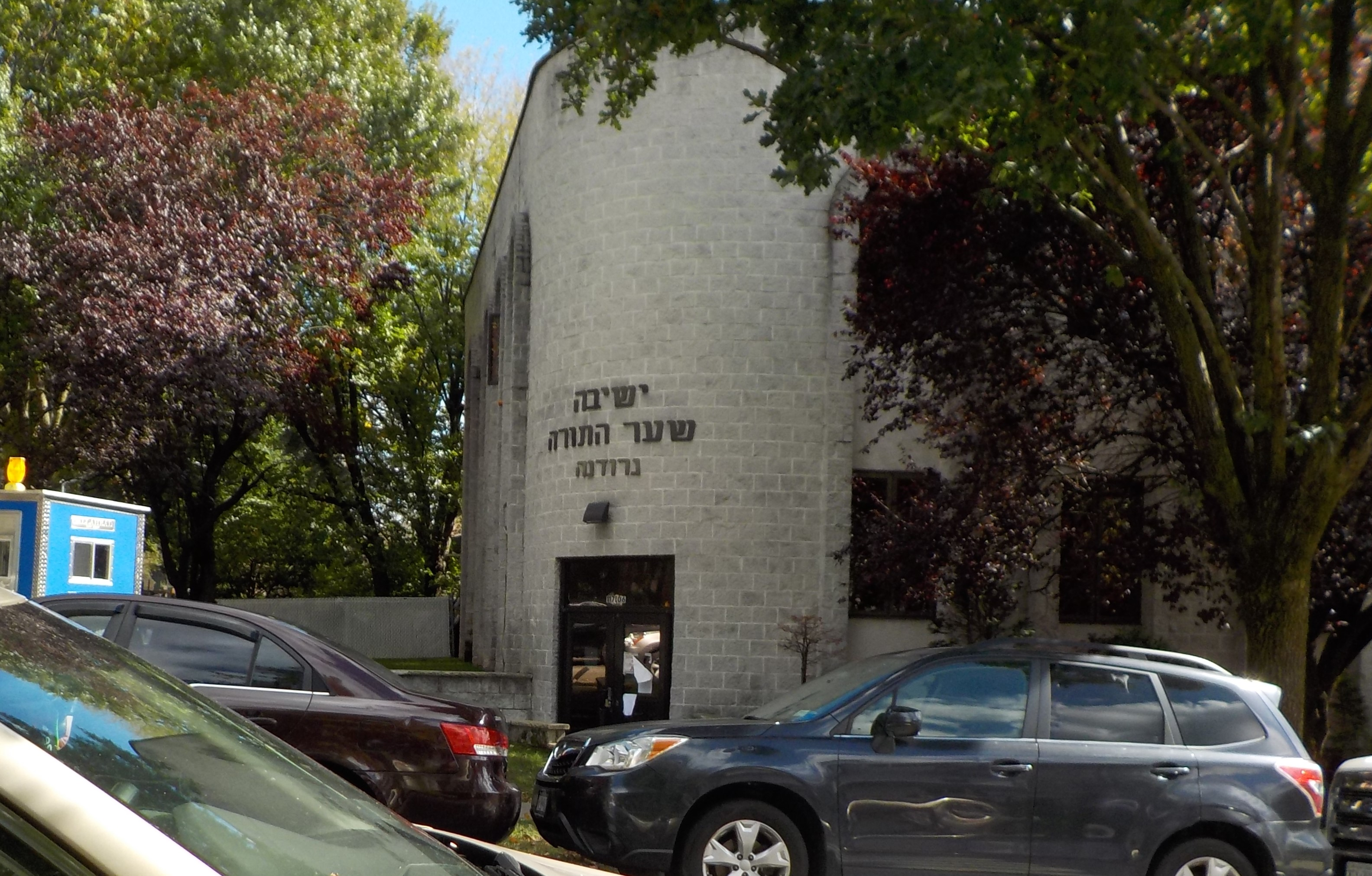
Yeshiva Shaar HaTorah-Grodno in Queens, New York

After the Soviet Union occupied Poland in 1939, the yeshiva disbanded and fled to Vilnius. Shkop wasn't healthy enough for the journey, so he remained in Grodno, where he died soon after.

The yeshiva was reestablished in Queens, New York under the same name, Yeshiva Shaar HaTorah, and led by Zelik Epstein, a grandson-in-law of Shkop. Yosef Shlomo Kahaneman opened another iteration of the yeshiva in Ashdod, Israel, as a branch of his Ponovezh Yeshiva.

== Notable alumni ==
- Zeidel Epstein, rosh mesivta at Rabbi Jacob Joseph School and mashgiach ruchani at Torah Ore
- Yisrael Zev Gustman, rosh yeshiva of the Ramailes Yeshiva
- Aryeh Leib Malin
- Tzvi Markovitz, rabbi in Ramat Gan and rosh yeshiva of the Karlin-Stolin yeshiva in Jerusalem
- Eliyahu Mishkovsky, rosh yeshiva of Knesses Chizkiyahu
- Shmuel Rozovsky, rosh yeshiva of the Ponovezh Yeshiva
- Chaim Leib Shmuelevitz, rosh yeshiva of Mir
- Naftali Wasserman, son of Elchonon Wasserman
- Zev Wein, rabbi of Beth Hamedrosh Hagadol Kesser Maariv in Chicago, and father of Berel Wein
