= Zelik Epstein =

American Orthodox Jewish rabbi (1914–2009)

Zelik Epstein, also known as Zelig Epstein (full name Aharon Zelig Epstein) (July 10, 1914 – August 3, 2009), was a prominent Orthodox rabbi and rosh yeshiva of Yeshiva Shaar HaTorah-Grodno, a private Talmudical institution in Kew Gardens, Queens, New York, containing a high school, Beis Midrash, and Kollel. Epstein was considered by many to be the last of the Gedolim of his generation.

== Biography ==
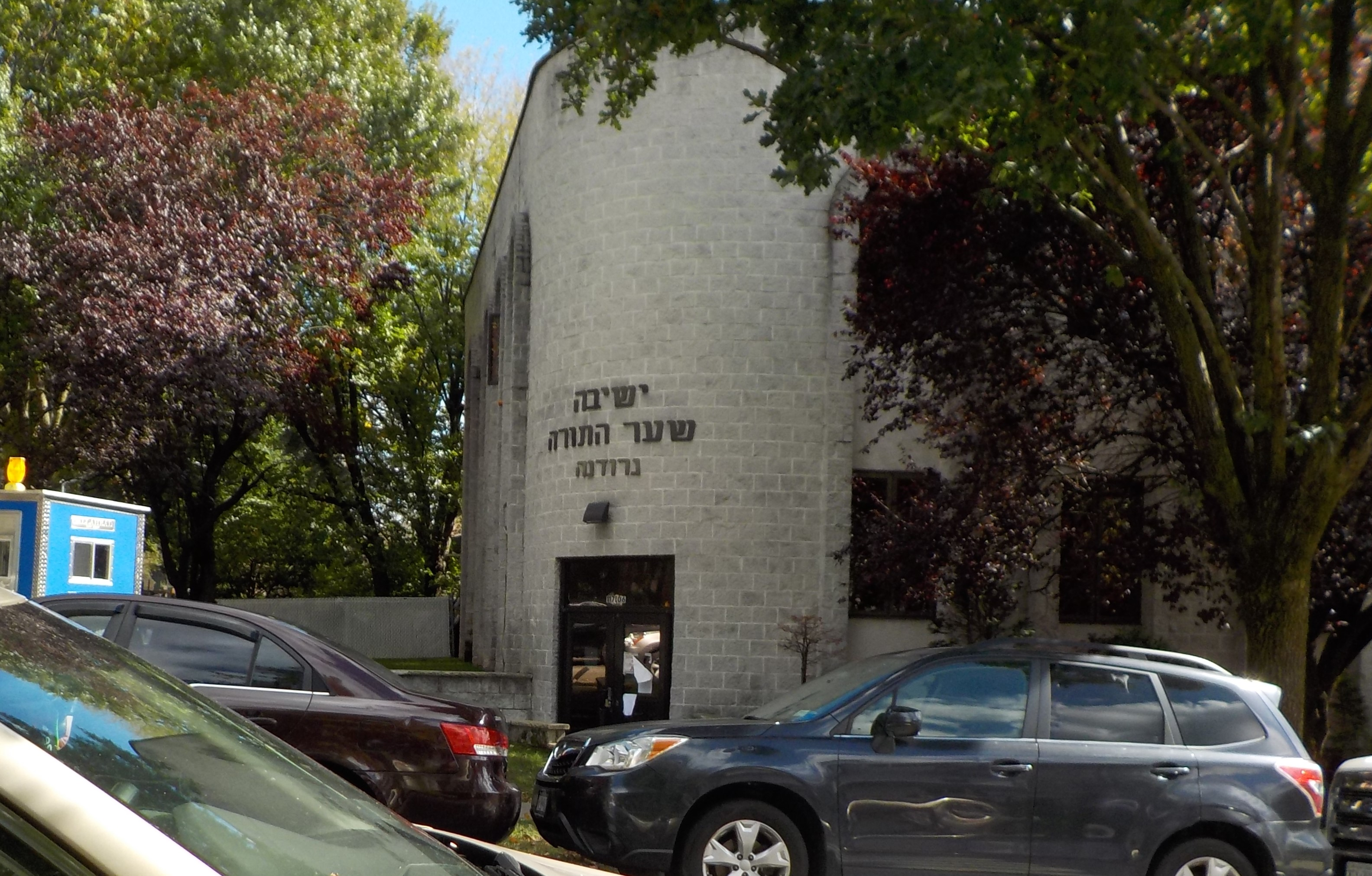
Yeshiva Shaar HaTorah in Queens

Rabbi Epstein was born in Slonim, Belarus, then part of the Russian Empire, on July 10, 1912. He studied in Mir, and escaped with the yeshiva to Shanghai during World War II. After the war, he and other refugees traveled to Canada, and en route to Montreal, stopped in Toronto, where he met Rabbi Yaakov Kamenetsky, then a rabbi in Toronto. Rabbi Kamenetsky was impressed by him and later called him back to Toronto where he was given a teaching position in the Talmud Torah and yeshiva. When Rabbi Kamenetsky moved to New York and was appointed rosh yeshiva of Yeshiva Torah Vodaath, Rabbi Epstein followed and became a teacher there as well. The two rabbis shared maintained a close relationship, with Rabbi Epstein's wedding taking place in the Kamenetsky home. After leaving Torah Vodaath, he was appointed rosh yeshiva of Yeshiva Shaar HaTorah- Grodno in Queens, named for the yeshiva in Grodno of his wife's grandfather, Rabbi Shimon Shkop.

Epstein maintained a relatively low profile – for example, he did not join the Moetzes Gedolei HaTorah, despite numerous invitations. His non-membership in the Moetzes, however, was a mere formality, as he still served as the address of last resort for many of the thorniest problems facing Klal Yisrael. His approbation was sought (and received) for a number of major projects, such as the Schottenstein edition of both the Talmud Bavli and Yerushalmi of which he was a big supporter of. He is known to have been a close confidant of several gedolei hador of the previous generation, including Rav Yaakov Kamenetsky and Rav Elazar Shach.

Epstein married a granddaughter of Shimon Shkop, rosh yeshiva of the original Yeshiva Shaar HaTorah-Grodno. He had two children, a son named Kalman and a daughter named Elka. His son and successor, Rabbi Kalman Epstein, a Torah scholar in his own right, gives the highest level shiur in the Yeshiva. The lower level post High school lecture was given by Rabbi Shalom Spitz, and now as of 2021 given by Rabbi Zelik's grandson, Rabbi Kalman's son. In his later years, Epstein gave only one lecture a week, on Sefer Hamitzvot, written by Maimonidies. His son also assisted his father in running the Yeshiva due to the latter's advanced age.

Epstein supported Nathan Kamenetsky and his book Making of a Godol, stating in a letter to Yosef Sholom Eliashiv that "in my opinion there is no justification whatsoever to ban the aforementioned book."
