= Lomza Yeshiva =

Coordinates: 32.08519°N 34.88369°E

- ישיבת לומזה
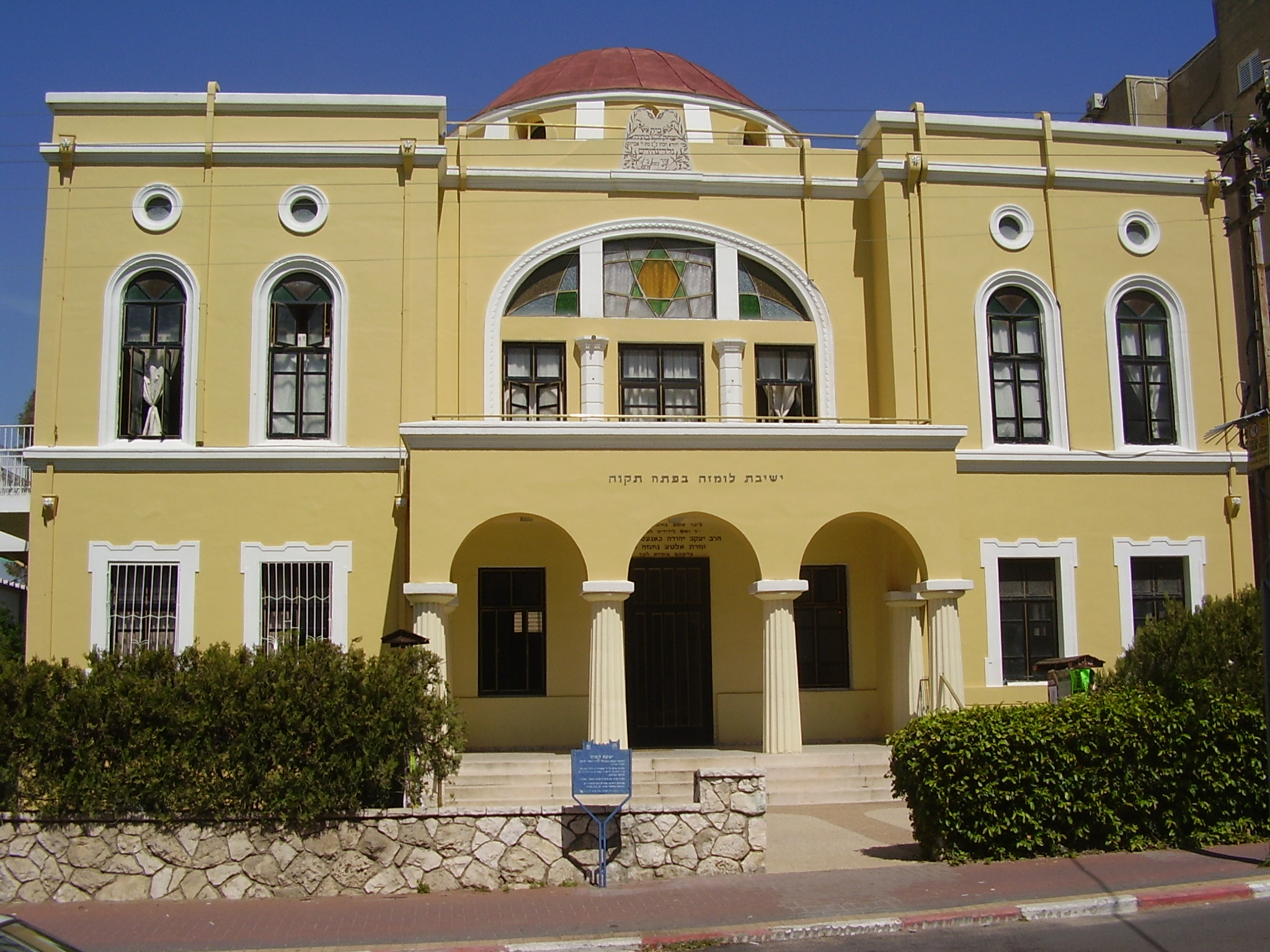
- The Lomze Yeshiva in Petach Tikva
- Łomża; Poland

Information
- Religious affiliation: Orthodox Judaism
- Established: 1883
- Founder: Rabbi Leizer Shulevitz
- Closed: 1940 (Lomza branch)
- Faculty: • Rabbi Yechiel Mordechai Gordon • Rabbi Yehoshua Zelig Ruch • Rabbi Moshe Rosenstain • Rabbi Reuven Katz

The Lomza Yeshiva (Hebrew: ישיבת לומזה) was an Orthodox Jewish yeshiva in Łomża, Poland, founded by Rabbi Eliezer Bentzion Shulevitz in 1883. Rabbi Yechiel Mordechai Gordon served as the yeshiva's rosh yeshiva for many years, and Rabbi Moshe Rosenstain served as the mashgiach. A branch of the yeshiva was established in Petach Tikvah, Palestine in 1926, where Rabbi Reuven Katz served as co-rosh yeshiva alongside Rabbi Gordon.

== History ==
=== Rabbi Leizer Shulevitz ===
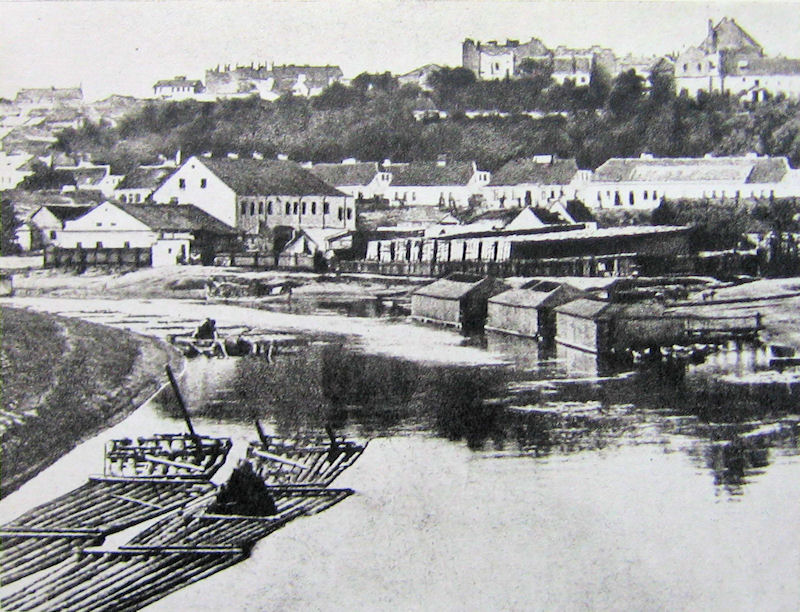
Lomza, Poland in 1912

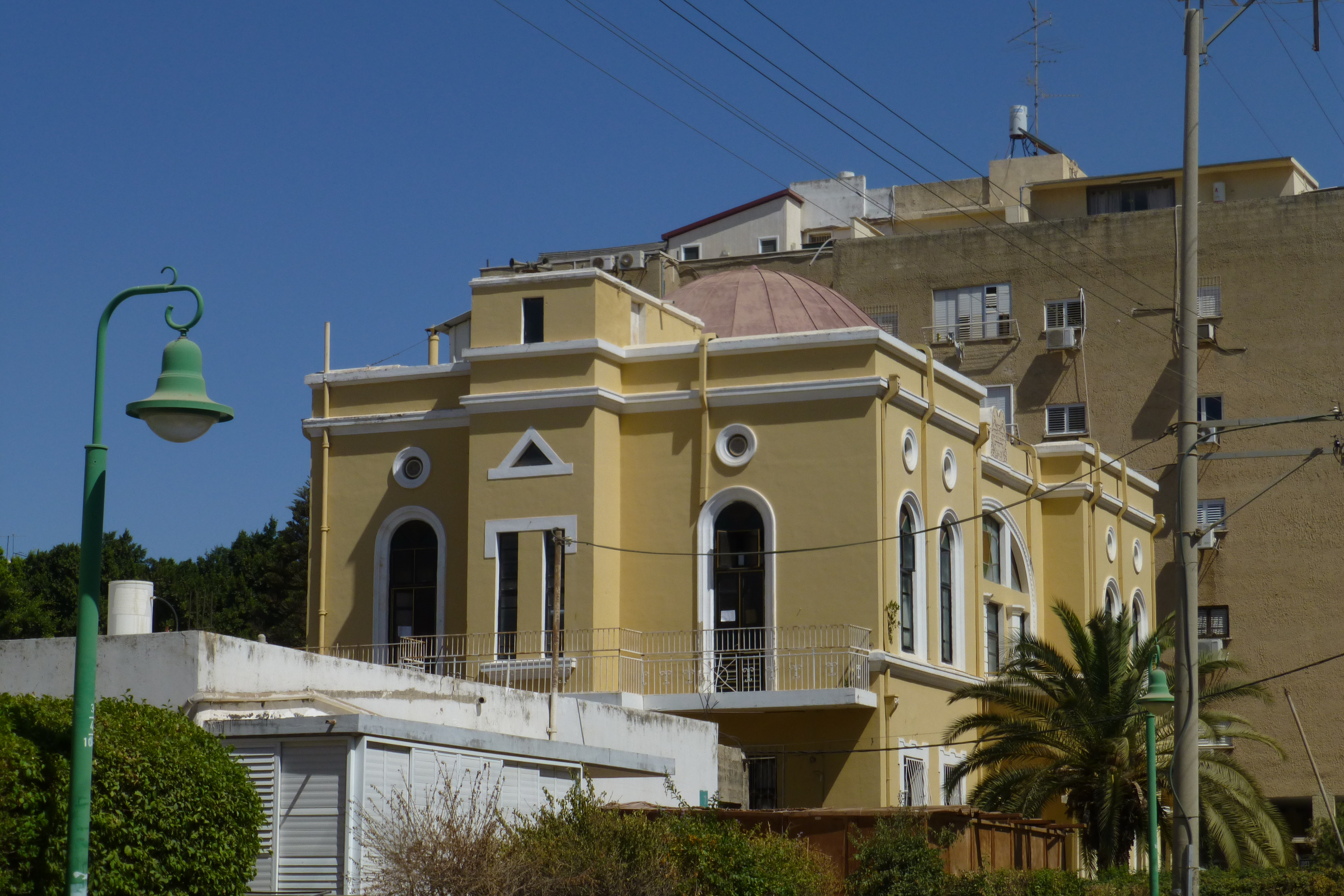
A view of the side of the Yeshiva building in Petach Tikva.

With the backing of Rabbi Chaim Leib Mishkovski (known as the Stavisker Tzaddik) and Rabbi Yisrael Meir Kagan (known as the Chofetz Chaim), Rabbi Leizer Shulevitz, a student of Rabbi Yisrael Salanter, founded the Lomza Yeshiva in 1883 in Lomza, Poland. When Rabbi Shulevitz purchased the lot for the yeshiva building to be built on, he entered the deed under the Stavisker's name. The local Jewish community financially helped out in the establishing of the yeshiva; one wealthy widow donated her entire fortune to the yeshiva and moved into an old-age home while another Jewish couple donated 35,000 bricks each.

The Yeshiva grew exponentially and when Rabbi Shulevitz accepted its four hundredth student, the local Jewish community who been supporting the yeshiva felt that the financial burden became too large. When rumors began circulating that Rabbi Shulevitz was considering closing the yeshiva, the Stavisker came to Lomza and took a walk with him, during which he strongly encouraged him to keep the yeshiva opened. Leading rabbis of the generation, including the Chafetz Chaim, issued appeals for help from Jewish communities. Wealthy Jews, specifically from Königsberg, East Prussia and Germany, contributed, and although the money helped, it was not enough, and so Rabbi Shulevitz had to leave Lomza on a fundraising trip.

When Rabbi Shulevitz asked Rabbi Nosson Tzvi Finkel, the Alter of Slabodka, who he should take as sons-in-law for his two daughters. The Alter suggested Rabbi Yechiel Mordechai Gordon, then known as the "Illuy (genius) of Trok" and later as the "Prince of all Roshei Yeshiva", for one of his daughters; and Rabbi Yehoshua Zelig Ruch, who been known as the most diligent student in the yeshivos of Telshe and Slabodka, for the other. With his sons-in-law established on the yeshiva faculty in Poland, Rabbi Shulevitz emigrated to Palestine.

=== Model for other Yeshivos ===
Rabbi Shulevitz split the yeshiva into five levels of shiurim (classes) (with the third shir eventually split into two, called "gimmel alef" and "gimmel beis", the Hebrew equivalent of 3A and 3B). This approach to teaching became famous and the chassidic Rebbes of Ger, Alexander, and Sochatchov all reached out to him for advice so they can set up their own yeshivos. Rabbi Yosef Yoizel Hurwitz (the Alter of Novardok) spent time in Lomza before building the Beis Yosef yeshiva network, in the same style as Rabbi Shulevitz's.

=== Rabbi Yechiel Mordechai Gordon ===
Rabbi Yechiel Mordechai Gordon

Rabbi Gordon joined his father-in-law as rosh yeshiva at the age of 24, in approximately 1907. While rosh yeshiva, there was a major threat of yeshiva students being drafted into the Polish army, which at the time was known to be anti-Semitic. He therefore traveled to Warsaw and approached Noach Pryłucki, the dean of Jewish members of the Sejm (the Polish parliament) and an old maskil. Pryłucki told him that the only way his students would be exempt from the draft would be if they added secular studies to the curriculum. Rabbi Gordon didn't not automatically abandon the idea and said that he needed to ask the opinion of greater rabbis. This turned out to be impossible as all communication with Rabbi Chaim Ozer Grodzensky in Vilna was severed during the war. In the end, the mashgiach of the yeshiva, Rabbi Moshe Rosenstain, together with a student, bribed the chairman of a local draft board with American dollars. Rabbi Rosenstain justified this seemingly illegal action, saying that the only reason the yeshiva students were drafted was because of anti-Semitism, as the Christian divinity students in Poland were exempt.

In 1926, Rabbi Gordon sent fifty students to the Eretz Yisrael where another branch of the yeshiva would be established. Rabbi Lazer Shulevitz, who was living there already, chose to open the yeshiva in Petach Tikvah. To support his two yeshivos, Rabbi Gordon had to travel throughout the world to collect funds. Rabbi Reuven Katz, Petach Tikvah's chief rabbi, served as rosh yeshiva alongside Rabbi Gordon.

== World War II ==
On September 7, 1939, the Nazi 21st Infantry Division invaded Lomza and the Battle of Łomża broke out. Three quarters of the city were destroyed but the yeshiva building, as well as the Talmud Torah and Rabbi Gordon's house next to the yeshiva, remained standing. Rabbi Gordon had been in America at the time and so Jewish families escaping the bombing in other parts of the city took refuge in his house.

== Notable students ==
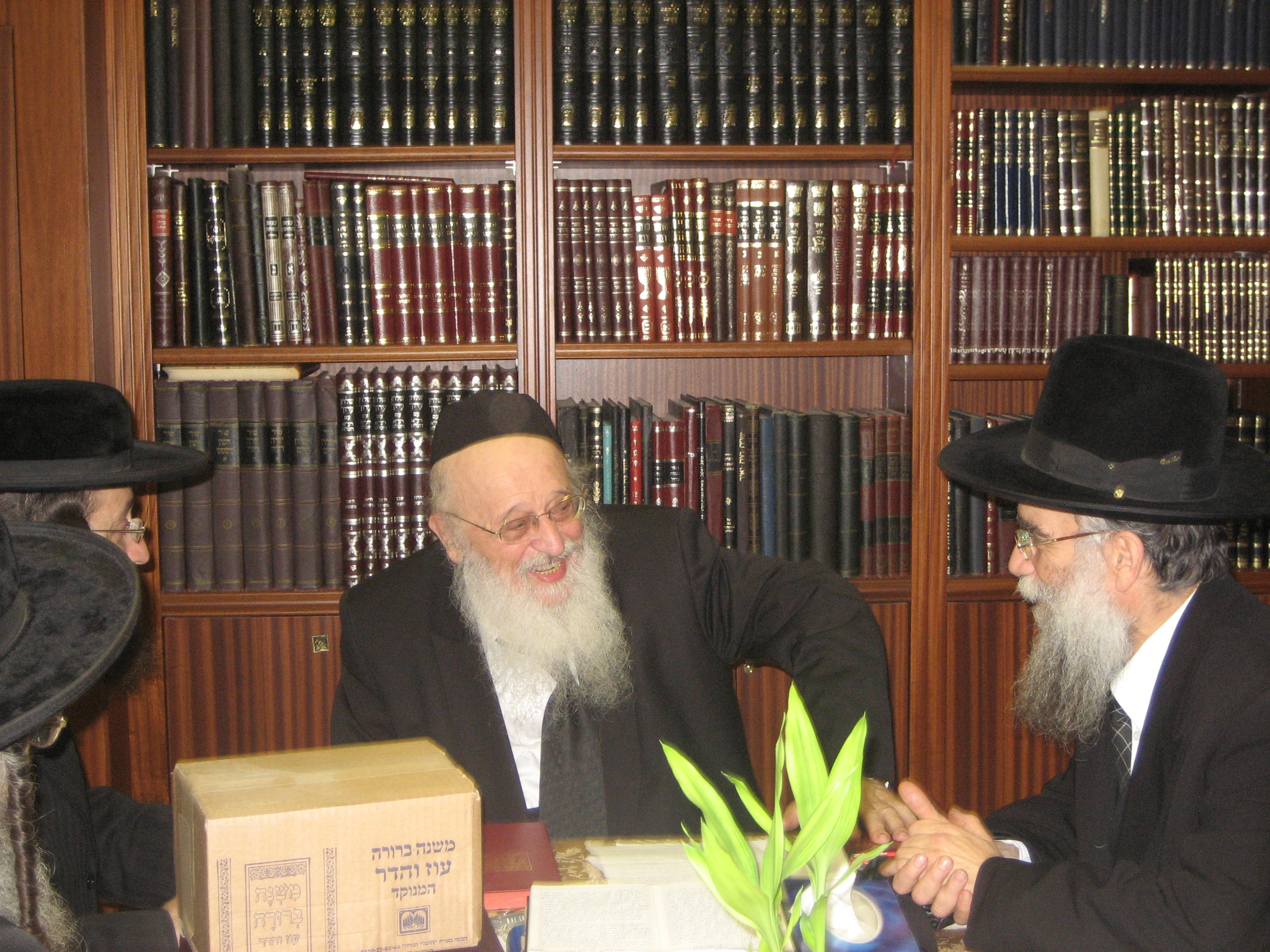
Rabbi Meir Tzvi Bergman

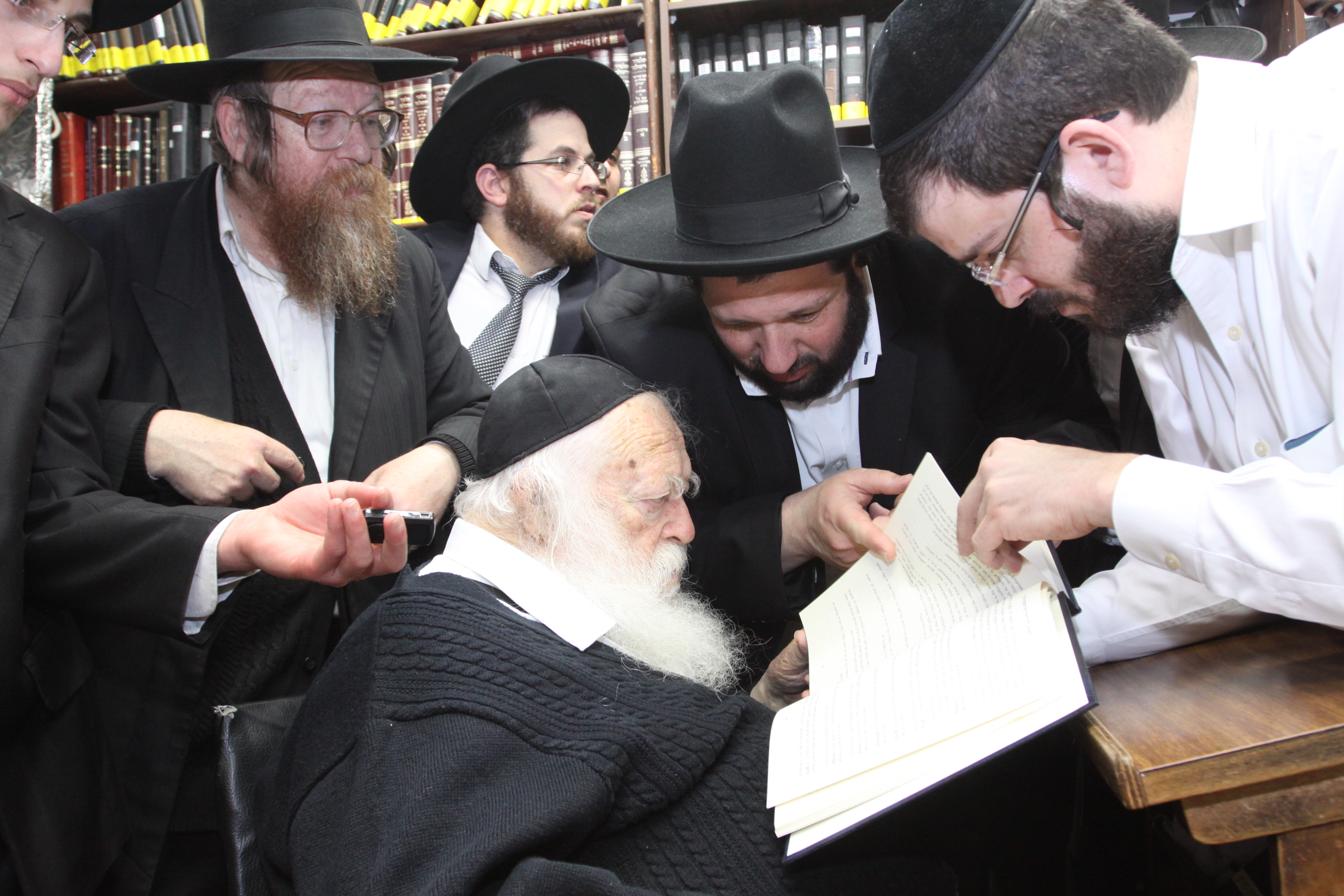
Rabbi Chaim Kanievsky

=== In Poland ===
- Rabbi Aharon Cohen (he), rosh yeshiva of the Chevron Yeshiva
- Rabbi Yaakov Neiman (he), rosh yeshiva of Yeshiva Ohr Yisrael in Lida and Petach Tikvah
- Rabbi Yaakov Kamenetzky, rosh yeshiva of Yeshiva Torah Vodaath
- Rabbi Eliyahu Botchko, rosh yeshiva of the Montreux Yeshiva
- Rabbi Ira Mordechai Davidson, scholar, rabbi of Israel Gardens Brooklyn Synagogue
- Rabbi Yaakov Eliezer Baker, Rav, author of Sefer Hazikaron for Yedvabne, and leader of a delegation of former Yedvabne Jews to dedicate a memorial in honor of the victims of the Jedwabne Pogrom in 2001.

=== In Israel ===
- Rabbi Meir Tzvi Bergman (he), rosh Yeshivas Rashbi
- Rabbi Moshe Shmuel Shapiro, rosh Yeshivas Be'er Yaakov
- Rabbi Shmuel Rozovsky, rosh Yeshivas Ponevezh
- Rabbi Chaim Kanievsky, prominent rabbi and posek
- Rabbi Moshe Soloveitchik, rosh yeshiva in Lucerne, Switzerland
- Rabbi Gershon Edelstein, rosh Yeshivas Ponevezh
- Rabbi Yissachar Meir (he), rosh Yeshivat HaNegev
