= Yeshiva Shaar HaTorah =

Yeshiva in Queens, New York, United States

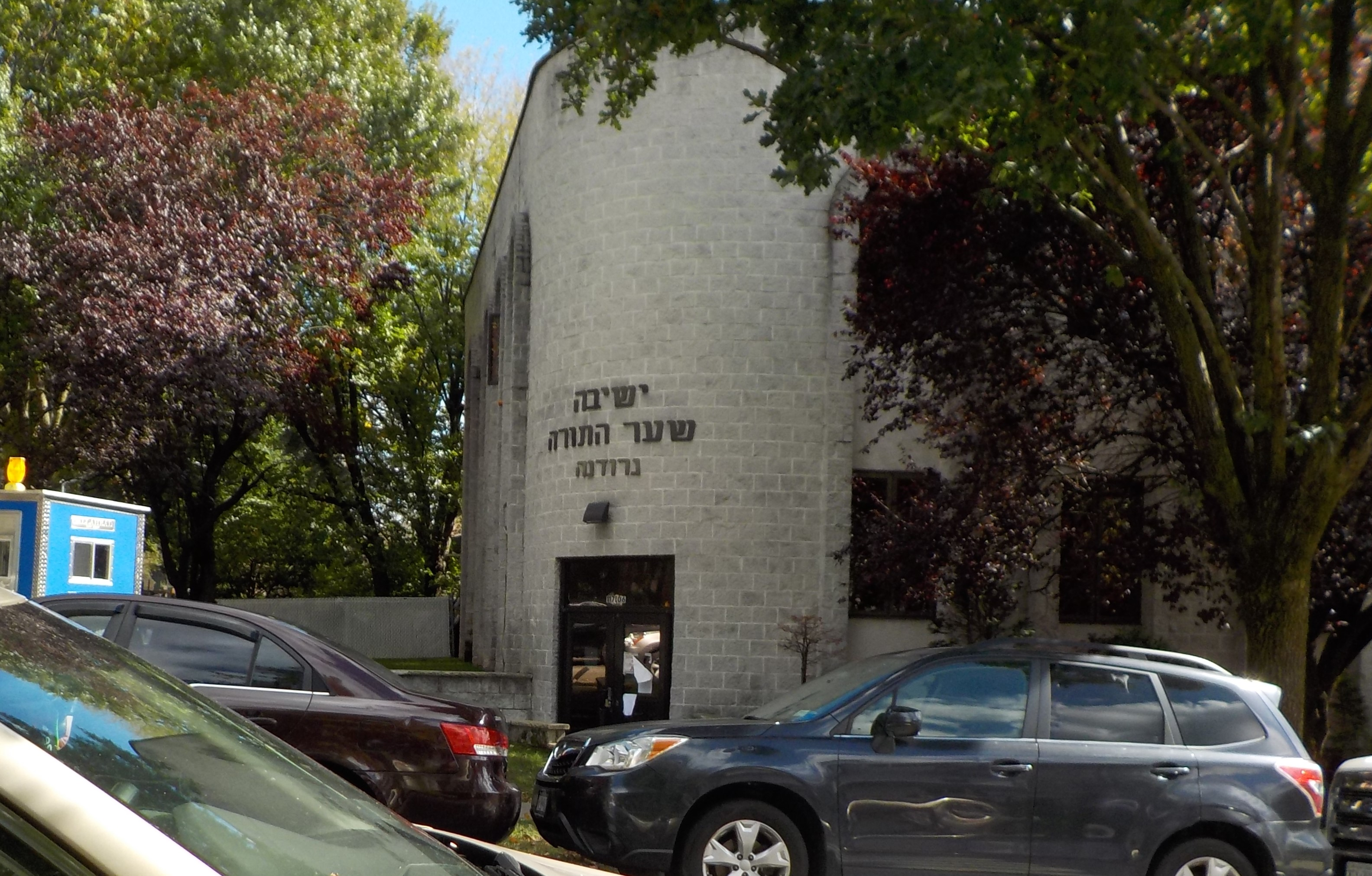

Location
- 117-06 84th Ave. Kew Gardens; Queens, New York 11418; United States; 40.70379°N 73.83428°W

Information
- Type: Jewish boys' high school and Talmudic college
- Religious affiliation: Haredi Judaism
- Established: 1974
- Rosh Yeshiva: Rabbi Kalman Epstein; Rabbi Sholom Spitz
- Mashgiach: Rabbi Matisyahu Roberts
- Grades: High school, undergraduate, postgraduate
- Accreditation: AARTS
- Website: shaarhatorah.edu

Yeshiva Shaar HaTorah-Grodno is an Orthodox yeshiva and high school in Kew Gardens, Queens, New York. It was founded in 1974 by Rabbi Kalman Epstein and Rabbi Sholom Spitz. It has programs for high school boys, as well as undergraduate and graduate programs that result in Talmudic law degrees.

== History ==
In 1974, Rabbi Kalman Epstein and Rabbi Sholom Spitz founded Yeshiva Shaar Hatorah-Grodno in Queens at the behest of Rabbi Spitz's teacher, Rabbi Mordechai Elefant. It is officially a branch of Yeshivas Itri in Jerusalem, which was started by Rabbi Elefant. The yeshiva was named "Shaar HaTorah" after the Grodno Yeshiva where Rabbi Epstein's great-grandfather, Rabbi Shimon Shkop, had been the rosh yeshiva. At the time, Rabbi Epstein gave the lecture shiur in Yiddish to undergraduate students, and Rabbi Spitz headed the graduate program. A year after the founding of the yeshiva, Rabbi Epstein's father, Rabbi Zelik Epstein, joined it. He was made the Rosh Hayeshiva, a post he held until his passing in 2009.

Today, Rabbi Kalman Epstein's son, Rabbi Shimon Epstein (named for his great-great grandfather) gives the shiur to freshman and sophomore students, while Rabbi Kalman Epstein lectures to the junior, senior, and graduate students.

== Academics ==
The curriculum focuses on Talmudic law, Aramaic texts, theology, philosophy, and epistemology. There is also a secular studies curriculum for high school students. In past years, the yeshiva spent the first month of the summer in Camp Ohr Shraga, a camp in Ellenville, NY that hosts several yeshivos for a month every summer. In recent years, the beis medrash post-high school program has stayed in Queens for that month, while the high school continues to go to Camp Ohr Shraga every summer. In Camp Ohr Shraga, the students continue studying, albeit not necessarily the same tractate of Gemara that they had been studying the rest of the year. They also engage in summer activities, including ball playing.
