= Yisroel Zev Gustman =

RabbiYisroel Zev Gustman
- Born: 1908
- Died: June 10, 1991 (aged 82) (28 Sivan 5751 Anno Mundi)
- Burial place: Mount of Olives
- Occupations: Rosh Yeshiva, Dayan
- Spouse: Sarah (Bassin) Gustman
- Parent: Avrohom Tzvi Gustman

Yisroel Zev Gustman (1908 - June 10, 1991) was a rabbi, and the last Dayan (rabbinic judge) in Vilna during World War II.

After the war he moved to the United States, and was appointed rosh yeshiva at Yeshivas Tomchei Temimim Lubavitch in Brooklyn, NY. In 1971, he immigrated to Israel, where he established the Netzach Yisroel - Vilna Ramiles Yeshiva in the Rechavia neighborhood of Jerusalem.

On Thursday afternoons, he gave an open, high-level shiur in the yeshiva, attended by "Rabbis, intellectuals, religious court judges, a Supreme Court justice and various professors."

== Biography ==
Yisroel Zev Gustman was born in Lithuania (then in the Pale of Settlement of the Russian Empire) in 1908. In his youth he was known as an illui and learned in Chavrusa together with Chaim Shmuelevitz in Grodno, and learned from Shimon Shkop at the Grodno Yeshiva.

At age 20, he married Sarah, a daughter of Rabbi Meir Bassin who had died shortly before the wedding; despite his age, Gustman inherited Bassin's positions of both dayan in the Bais Din of Rabbi Chaim Ozer Grodzinski and Rosh Yeshiva of the Ramailes Yeshiva in Vilna.

Gustman's son Meir was murdered by the Nazis. Gustman, his wife Sarah and a daughter survived.

=== Life in Israel ===
The yeshiva he opened in Israel was named after the yeshiva in Vilna he had headed, beginning in 1935 until World War II.

== Written works ==
Gustman's main writings, entitled Kuntresei Shiurim, some published posthumously by his son-in-law, were volumes on the following Talmudic tractates:

- Yevamos
- Gittin
- Kiddushin
- Bava Kama
- Bava Metzia
- Bava Batra
- Nedarim
- Ketubot
