= Ramailes Yeshiva =

Pre-World War II yeshiva

- ישיבת רמיילס

Location
- Šnipiškės, Vilnius; Lithuania
- 54°42′07″N 25°16′33″E

Information
- Religious affiliation: Orthodox Judaism
- Established: 1815/1827
- Founder: Rabbi Avraham Abli Posveller
- Closed: c. 1940

The Ramailes Yeshiva was an Orthodox Jewish yeshiva in Šnipiškės, Vilnius, Lithuania. It was established in the early nineteenth century, most likely in 1815.

== Name ==
The yeshiva's commonly used name, Ramailes, is based on the name of the building's donor who was known as Reb Mailes or Reb Maille. The official name may have been Yeshiva Tomchai Torah.

== History ==
According to one source, the yeshiva was founded in 1815. Another source states that Reb Mailes had willed a building and courtyard that he owned to be a yeshiva around that time. Another source says the yeshiva was founded in 1827, and that Reb Mailes donated a building that he owned in 1831. A fourth source, like the first, says that the yeshiva was established in 1815, and like the third, says that it only moved to the building in 1831.

The yeshiva's first rosh yeshiva (dean) was Rabbi Yoel Naftali Hertz who was later joined by Rabbi Eliezer Teitz, a student of Rabbi Akiva Eiger. In 1840, Rabbi Yisrael Salanter was appointed rosh yeshiva. Salanter decided that his success in yeshiva was creating envy among other faculty members, and therefore left the yeshiva and began teaching in another beis midrash. Other rosh yeshivas between Ramailes' founding and World War I included rabbis Mordechai Meltzer (Klecki), Dovid Klecki, Alexander Sender Epstein, Yitzchak Epstein, Meir Michel Rabinowitz (author of Meor Olam), Yaakov Peskin, Shmuel Peskin, and Shmuel Isser HaKohen. After World War I, Rabbi Moshe Menachem Kozlowski became rosh yeshiva.

Later Rabbi Meir Bassin, a member of the Vilna Rabbinate and the rabbi of the Vilna neighborhood of Shnipishok where the yeshiva was, became rosh yeshiva. Rabbi Chaim Ozer Grodzensky of Vilna oversaw the yeshiva and in 1927 appointed Rabbi Shlomo Heiman to be rosh yeshiva. About a year later Bassin died. In 1935, Heiman left to America where he became rosh yeshiva in Yeshiva Torah Vodaath. In 1935 Rabbi Yisroel Levovitz was appointed rosh yeshiva.

=== Merging with Yeshivas HaK'tzavim ===
Yeshivas HaK'tzavim, another yeshiva in Vilna, was led by Rabbi Eliyahu Gershon Halperin. At some point before World War II, it merged with the Ramailes Yeshiva, with Halperin joining the Ramailes faculty.

== Reestablishment After World War II ==
Rabbi Yisroel Zev Gustman was Rabbi Bassin's son-in-law. He lectured in Ramailes starting in 1935.

Rabbi Gustman survived the Holocaust, and after World War II, became rosh yeshiva of the Lubavitch hasidic sect's main school, Yeshiva Tomchei Temimim at 770 Eastern Parkway in Brooklyn. After a few years, he opened a new school, Yeshiva Netzach Yisrael–Ramailes of Vilna. In 1970 Rabbi Gustman moved to Israel and moved the yeshiva there, under the same name. After he died in 1991, his son-in-law, Rabbi Michel Bernicker, became rosh yeshiva.

== Notable alumni ==
- Rabbi Shmuel Brudny
- Rabbi Michel Yehudah Lefkowitz
- Rabbi Nochum Partzovitz
