= Shimon Shkop =

Lithuanian-Belarusian Orthodox rabbi, rosh yeshiva of Telshe and Grodno

Rabbi Shimon Yehuda Shkop

Personal life
- Born: 1860 Torez, Don Host Oblast, Russian Empire (present-day Chystiakove, Ukraine)
- Died: October 22, 1939 (aged 78–79) Grodno, Byelorussian SSR, Soviet Union (present-day Belarus)
- Spouse: Leah Shkop (née Idelevich)
- Parents: Yitzchak Shmuel Shkop (father); Rachel Shkop (née Kaplan) (mother)
- Education: Volozhin Yeshiva

Religious life
- Religion: Judaism
- Denomination: Orthodox Judaism

Jewish leader
- Predecessor: Rabbi Alter Shulevitz
- Position: Rosh yeshiva
- Yeshiva: Grodno Yeshiva
- Began: 1920
- Ended: 1939
- Main work: Shaarei Yosher
- Yahrtzeit: 9 Marcheshvan
- Residence: Grodno, Belarus

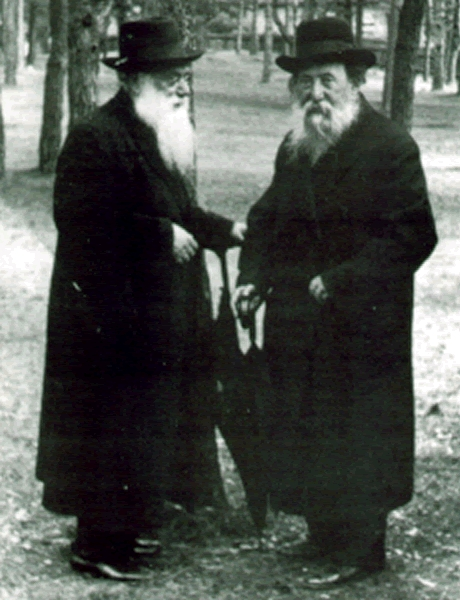
Shkop (left) and Chaim Ozer Grodzinski

Shimon Yehuda Shkop (Hebrew: שמעון שקופ; 1860 – October 22, 1939) was Rosh Yeshiva (dean) of the Yeshiva of Telshe, and later of Yeshiva Shaar HaTorah of Grodno. Having innovated a style of Torah study, applying both to Halacha and to Talmud, he was widely regarded as a major Talmid Chacham (Talmudic scholar).

== Biography ==
=== Early life ===
Shkop was born in Torez, today in Ukraine, in 1860. At the age of twelve he went to study in the Mir Yeshiva for two years. He then traveled to the Volozhin yeshiva where he studied under Naftali Zvi Yehuda Berlin, "Netziv", for six years. His study partners included Chaim Ozer Grodzinski. Shkop also joined the chaburah of Rav Chaim Soloveitchik, "Chaim Brisker", analyzing the gemara using what would come to be called the "Brisker derech"; he was thus among the first students exposed to the new approach.

=== Telz and Grodno ===
Shkop married a niece of Eliezer Gordon, and in 1884 was appointed a rosh mesivta at Telz Yeshiva, where he remained for 18 years.

While there, he developed a system of Talmudic study which became known as the "Telz way of learning;" this approach combined the above influences:- the logical analysis and penetrating insights of Rav. Chaim Brisker and the simplicity and clarity of Netziv.

In 1903, he became rabbi of Malech (Малеч) (present day Belarus), and in 1907 of Bransk. Among his students in Malech was Yechezkel Sarna, who studied under Shkop for a year in 1906, before leaving to the Slabodka yeshiva when Shkop himself left.

From 1920 to 1939 he was Rosh Yeshiva of the Yeshiva Sha'ar HaTorah in Grodno.

=== Yeshiva University ===
In 1928, Shkop traveled to the United States in order to raise funds for the Yeshiva. After delivering a lecture at Yeshiva University, he became Rosh Yeshiva of Rabbi Isaac Elchanan Theological Seminary in New York. In 1929, Shkop returned to Europe.

=== Death ===
As the Russian army was about to enter Grodno during World War II, Shkop ordered his students to flee to Vilna. He himself died two days later, on the 9th of Cheshvan 5700 (1939) in Grodno. Shkop is buried in the Jewish cemetery in the Zaniemanski Forshtat section of Grodno.

== Works ==
His Sha'arei Yosher (1925), his most important work, is largely concerned with the intellectual principles by which the law is established, rather than with concrete laws, and is stylistically similar to the Shev Shema'tata of Aryeh Leib HaCohen Heller, on which it was partly based.

Other major works include:

- Ma'arekhet ha-Kinyanim (1936)
- Novellae on tractates Bava Kamma, Bava Metzia, and Bava Basra (1947)
- Novellae on Nedarim, Gittin, and Kiddushin (1952)
- Novellae on Yevamos and Ketuvot (1957)

== Students ==
- Yitzchok Dov Koppelman
- Michoel Fisher
- Yisrael Zev Gustman
- Yosef Shlomo Kahaneman
- Shmuel Rozovsky
- Yechezkel Sarna
- Isser Yehuda Unterman
- Elchonon Wasserman
