= Chaim Ozer Grodzinski =

Lithuanian rabbi and Talmudic scholar (1863–1940)

Rabbi Chaim Ozer Grodzinski
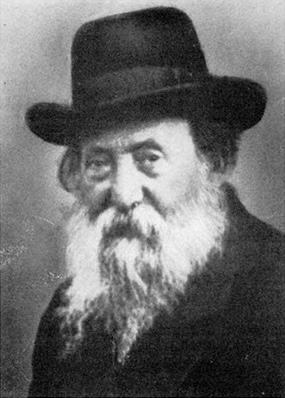

Personal life
- Born: August 24, 1863; 9 Elul 5623 AM (Hebrew calendar) Iwye, Vilna Governorate, Russian Empire (now Belarus)
- Died: August 9, 1940 (aged 76); 5 Av 5700 AM (Hebrew calendar) Vilnius, Soviet Lithuania
- Parent: Rabbi David Shlomo Grodzinski
- Education: Volozhin yeshiva
- Occupation: Rav of Vilnius, Lithuania

Religious life
- Religion: Judaism
- Denomination: Orthodox

Jewish leader
- Other: Leader of Lithuanian and European Jewry

Chaim Ozer Grodzinski (Hebrew: חיים עוזר גראדזענסקי; August 24, 1863 – August 9, 1940) was a Av beis din (rabbinical chief justice), posek (halakhic authority), and Talmudic scholar in Vilnius, Lithuania in the late 19th and early 20th centuries for over 55 years. He played an instrumental role in preserving Lithuanian yeshivas during the Communist era, and Polish and Russian yeshivas of Poland and during the Nazi invasion of Poland in 1939, when he arranged for these yeshivas to relocate to Lithuanian cities.

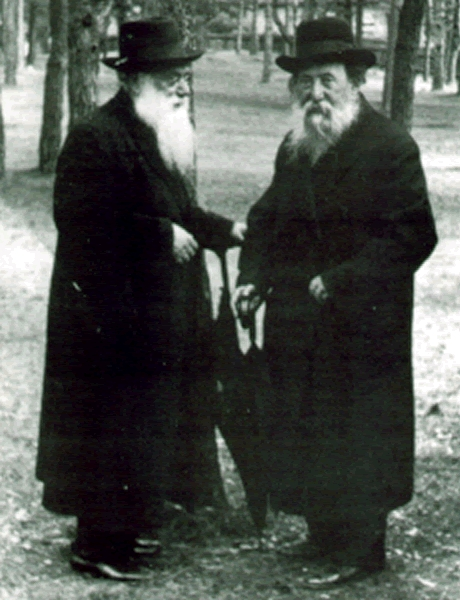
Rabbi Chaim Ozer Grodzinski (right) conversing with Rabbi Shimon Shkop

== Biography ==
Chaim Ozer Grodzinski was born on 9 Elul 5623 (24 August 1863) in Iwye, Belarus, a small town near Vilnius. His father, David Shlomo Grodzinski, was rabbi of Iwye for over 40 years, and his grandfather was rabbi of the town for 40 years before that.

When he was 12 years old he went to study with the perushim, a group of Lithuanian Torah scholars in Eishyshok where he became bar mitzvah.

At the age of 15, he began studying at the Volozhin yeshiva and was accepted into Chaim Soloveitchik's shiur. He was married in his early twenties to Leah Grodnenski. Her father, Eliyahu Eliezer Grodnenski, was the head of the Beth Din of Vilna (this was the most senior rabbinical position in Vilna). In 1887, after two years of marriage and at only 23 years old, Grodzinski took over his father-in-law's position, upon the latter's sudden passing.

=== Leadership ===
In 1887 he was appointed as a dayan (religious judge) of the beth din of Vilna. He was a participant in the founding conference of Agudath Israel (in Kattowitz, Silesia, in 1912) and served on the party's Council of Sages. He also was a co-founder and active leader of the Va'ad ha-Yeshivot (Council of the Yeshivot), based in Vilnius, an umbrella organization that offered material and spiritual support for yeshivot throughout the eastern provinces of Poland from 1924 to 1939. He wrote a three-volume work Achiezer.

He assisted in the management of the Rameilles Yeshiva of Vilnius. His students included Yehezkel Abramsky, Eliezer Silver, Moshe Shatzkes, and Reuven Katz.

In 1909, there was a meeting in Hamburg, Germany, that was the precursor of Agudas Yisroel, whose main goal was to combat the Zionists and the Mizrachi against Zionism. Grodzinski was the first chairman of the Moetzes Gedolei Torah, the rabbinical advisory board to the Agudah.

=== Death ===
Grodzinski died of cancer on 9 August 1940 (5 Av 5700).

== Works ==
Grodzinski's halachic opinion was highly regarded among the rabbis of his generation. His best known work is "Achiezer" a collection of his "shutim" (responsa). The work is known for its lengthy discussions centered on analysis as opposed to final ruling. In this work he often quotes Rabbi Akiva Eiger. Other works include two collections of correspondences by Rabbi Grodzinski on more general communal and Hashkafic matters.
