= Povarsky =

Povarsky (Hebrew: פוברסקי, Yiddish: פאווארסקי) is an Ashkenazi Jewish surname. Notable people with the surname include:

- Baruch Dov Povarsky
- Dovid Povarsky
