= Yaakov Peretz =

Sefardi Ultra Orthodox Rabbi in Israel

Rabbi Ya'aqob Peretz יעקב פרץ
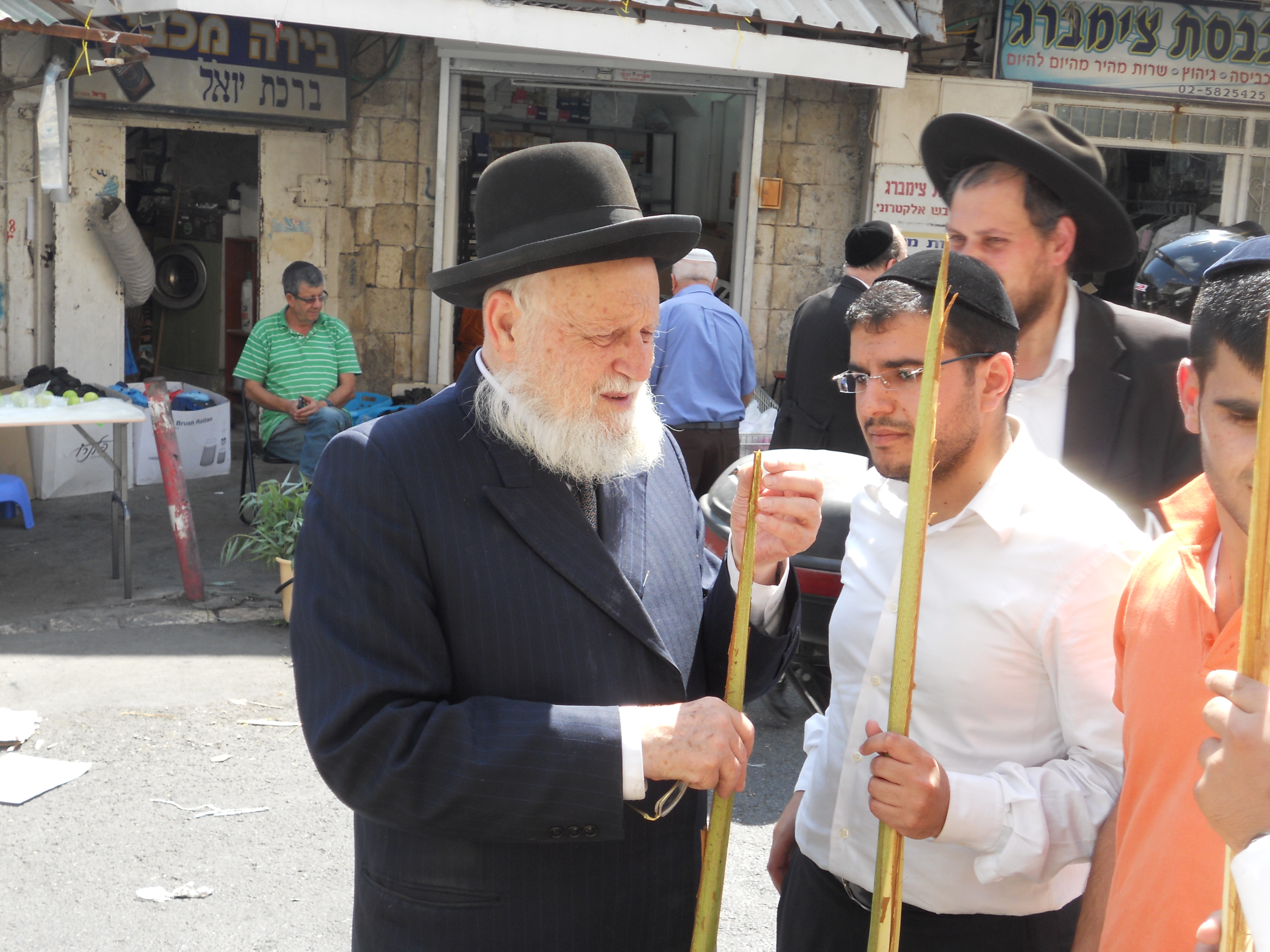
- Peretz teaching students in Jerusalem

Personal life
- Born: 1936, Marrakesh
- Died: 2024, Jerusalem
- Education: Ponevezh Yeshiva
- Occupation: Rabbi, Talmudic scholar, judge, lecturer, authority on Jewish law

Religious life
- Religion: Judaism
- Denomination: Orthodox Judaism

Jewish leader
- Position: Rosh Yeshiva (Shehebar Sephardic Center), Rosh Kollel (Kollel Hekhal Pinhas)
- Residence: Geula, Israel
- Semikhah: Yosef Shlomo Kahaneman

Yaakov Peretz (Hebrew: יעקב פרץ, Arabic: يعقوب بيرتس, sometimes transliterated Ya'aqob or Ya'aqobh, 1936 – 2024) was a posek (rabbi who decides points of Jewish law) and rosh yeshiva (dean of a Jewish seminary) in Israel.

== Biography ==
Peretz was born in the Jewish Quarter of Marrakesh, Morocco where his father, Yossef Peretz, was a rabbi. As a child he attended Alliance Israélite Universelle schools. He was studied with and formed a close relationship with the Chief Rabbi of Morocco at the time, Shaʼul Ibn Danan [he].

When he was fifteen years old in 1951 he joined the migration of Moroccan Jews to Israel as part of the Youth Aliyah.

He studied for 20 years at the Ponevezh Yeshiva in Bnei Brak. He was ordained directly under the tutelage of the Ponevezh rosh yeshiva (dean), Yosef Shlomo Kahaneman, who decided to teach him specifically in Hebrew, as he did not speak Yiddish. He was also taught by Rabbi Baruch Dov Povarsky.

== Rabbinic career ==
He was the Chief Rabbi of the Neve Yaakov district of Jerusalem until his death in 2024. He was the Rosh Yeshiva of the Shehebar Sephardic Center and the Rosh Kollel of Kollel Hekhal Pinhas in Geula/Meah Shearim, Israel. He also oversaw the Shiviti Bet Din.

He wrote many books on Halakha and Jewish Ethics, and ordained hundreds of leading Rabbis as well as many active Chief Rabbis around the globe.

He traveled to Jewish communities around the world, including in Argentina and Uzbekistan, to supervise matters of Jewish Law.

== Beliefs ==
Rabbi Peretz was very against Halakhic rulings that are overly stringent, and insisted on the importance of all Jews following the law as stated by Maran Bet Yossef to the letter. He rejected religious Anti-Zionism, maintained the importance of physical exercise and secular studies (English, Math, Science, etc.), and insisted on the value of not just focusing study on Talmud, but also on Miqra, Hebrew Grammar, and more. He also adamantly defended learning the Peshat as the ideal method (for learning Miqra, Talmud, etc.) as opposed to analytical or Pilpul oriented schools of thought. He viewed all of these positions as the way things were always done by the Jews of the Middle East and the way he was raised and taught in Morocco.
