= Midrash Shmuel Yeshiva =

Midrash Shmuel
- מדרש שמואל

Location
- 13 Sha'arei Hesed St. Sha'arei Hesed; Jerusalem; Israel
- 31.7775°N 35.2130°E

Information
- Established: 1993
- Rosh Yeshiva: Rabbi Binyomin Moskovits
- Affiliation: Orthodox Judaism
- Bachurim: 120
- Website: www.midrashshmuel.org

Midrash Shmuel (Hebrew: מדרש שמואל) is a Haredi yeshiva catering to Yeshiva students, located in the Sha'arei Hesed neighborhood in Jerusalem. It was founded in 1993 by Rabbi Binyomin Moskovits (who functions as its Rosh HaYeshiva, or dean), and was named after his mentor, Rabbi Shmuel Rozovsky.

== Educational goals ==
The yeshiva is designed for English-speaking post-high-school students from both inside and outside Israel. Midrash Shmuel also has an introductory program called Aliyos Shmuel for college graduates and older students who seek to learn at a beginner's level, and a kollel (post-graduate) program which enrolls approximately 150 married students. All classes are held in English. The Yeshiva places immense importance on Torah study with special emphasis on Talmud study in depth. As opposed to more moderate interpretations, the Yeshiva views Talmud study not as a means to an end but an end in it of itself.

== History ==
Midrash Shmuel is part of the widespread trend since the 1970s of yeshiva Torah study programs in Israel for post-high-school students from America and other English-speaking countries. In the 1970s there were only a handful of such programs for overseas students at the Mir, Brisk yeshiva, and Ponovezh yeshiva. Today, there are dozens of such yeshivas.

Rabbi Moskovits opened Midrash Shmuel in the early 1990s at the urging of his students and with the heartfelt encouragement of Torah giants of the generation, Rabbi Shlomo Zalman Auerbach and Rabbi Elazar Menachem Mann Shach, among others.

== Educational activities ==
Midrash Shmuel recruits students from the United States, United Kingdom, Germany, Russia, Mexico, South Africa, and France who have completed yeshiva high schools and its dean is active in this regard.

Students in the rabbinic ordination program receive semikhah directly from the rosh yeshiva Rabbi Moskovits. Students develop personal relationships with the rosh yeshiva and rabbinic lecturers which continue after graduation, as alumni participate in reunions and yeshiva fund-raising events in communities where they settle.

=== Curriculum ===
Rabbi Moskovits' gemara lectures are heavily influenced by Rabbi Shmuel Rozovsky, while his ethical lectures are influenced by Rabbi Yechezkel Levenstein. Moskovits emphasizes a strong textual reading of relevant sources. Every student in the yeshiva delivers, at a minimum, two chaburos ("informal lectures") per month.

=== Summer programs ===
Midrash Shmuel runs summer programs for high school students from England, Canada, the United States, and South Africa. The programs combine in-depth gemara learning and halakha, mussar, and hashkafah shiurim with recreational outings and activities.

=== College accreditation ===
College credits are offered through Touro College and Hebrew Theological College.

=== Women's program ===
In August 2010, actress and dancer Rachel Factor, whose husband studies at the Midrash Shmuel kollel, opened Midreshes Shmuel, a post-high school women's Torah learning and performing arts program, under the direction of Moskovits. However, this branch of the school closed in 2012.

== Notable alumni ==
- Rabbi Natan Slifkin
- Rabbi Shmuel Phillips
