= Pozhoga =

Pozhoga (Russian: Пожога) is the name of several rural localities in Russia:

- Pozhoga, Moscow Oblast, a village in Dmitrovskoye Rural Settlement of Shatursky District of Moscow Oblast
- Pozhoga, Nizhny Novgorod Oblast, a village in Novoselsky Selsoviet of Vachsky District of Nizhny Novgorod Oblast
- Pozhoga, Smolensk Oblast, a village in Ozernoye Rural Settlement of Shumyachsky District of Smolensk Oblast
