= Gershon Edelstein =

Israeli Haredi rabbi (1923–2023)

Rabbi Gershon Edelstein זצ'ל
- גרשון אדלשטיין
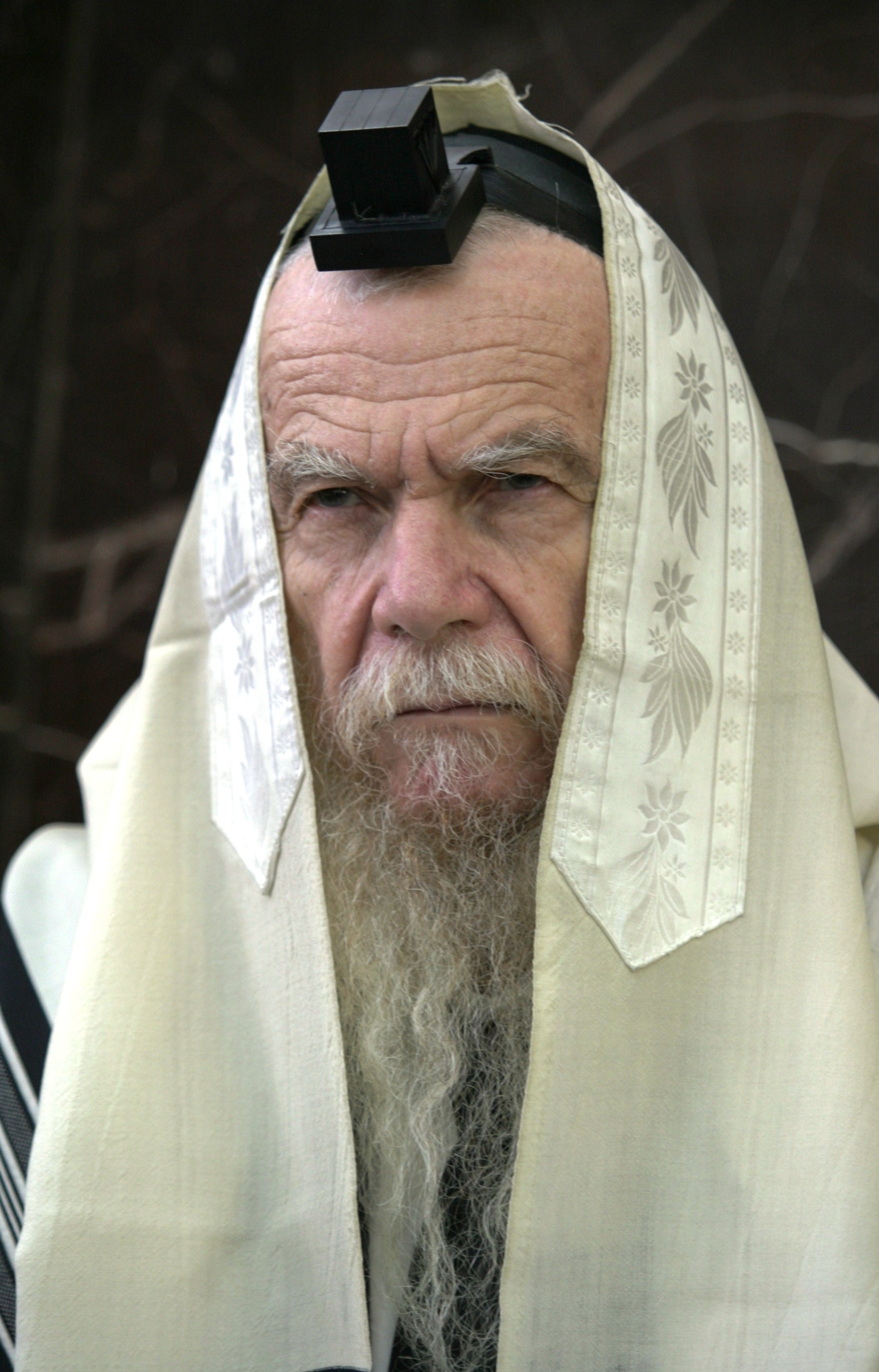
- Edelstein, c. 2000s

Personal life
- Born: Yerachmiel Gershon Edelstein; 18 April 1923 Shumyachi, Roslavlsky Uyezd, Smolensk Governorate, Russian SFSR, USSR (now Russia)
- Died: 30 May 2023 (aged 100) Bnei Brak, Israel
- Parent: Rabbi Tzvi Yehudah Edelstein (father)
- Education: Ponovezh Yeshiva

Religious life
- Religion: Judaism

Jewish leader
- Position: Rosh Yeshiva
- Yeshiva: Ponevezh Yeshiva, Bnei Brak

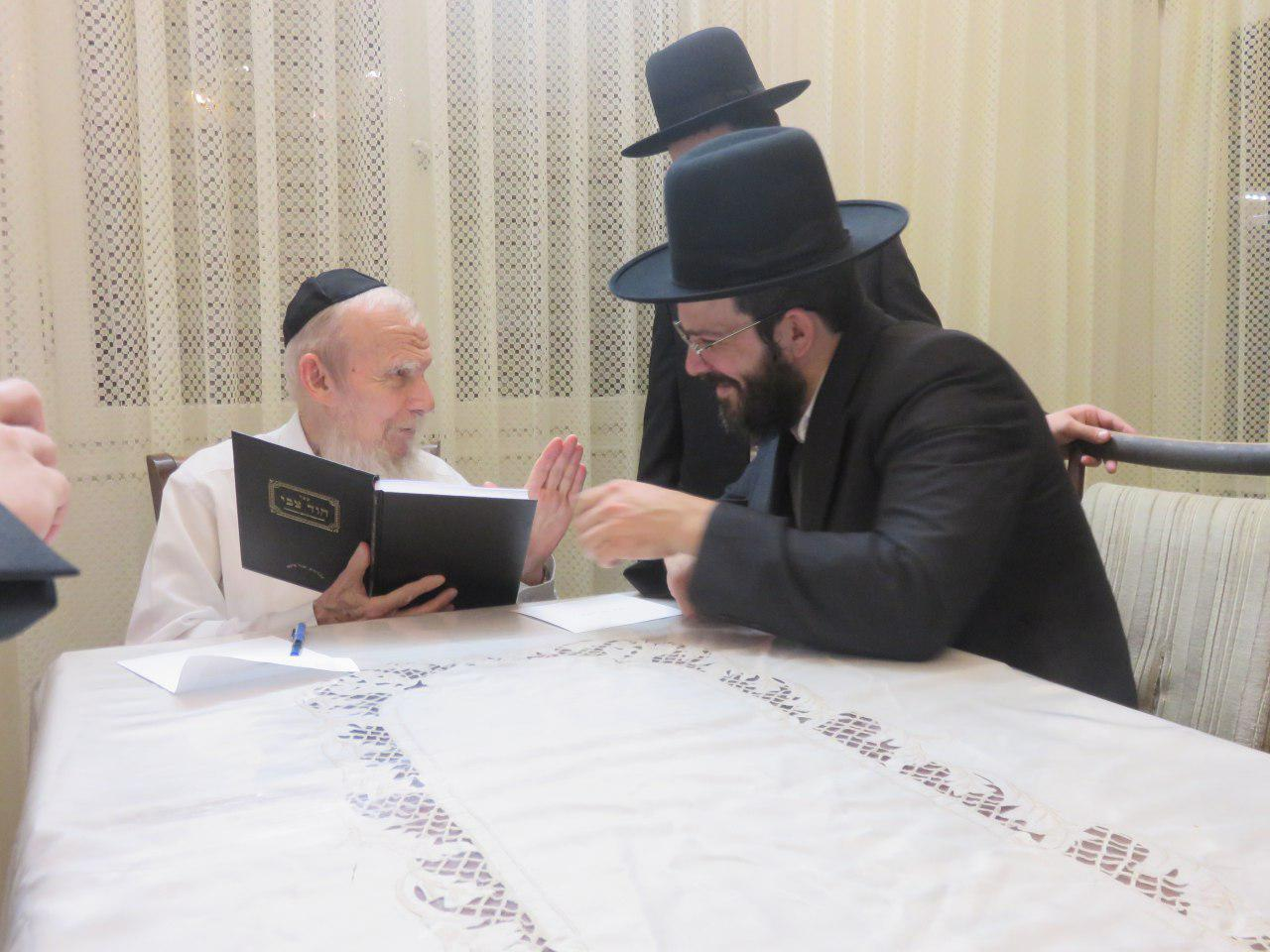
Aryeh Kanievsky visiting Rabbi Gershon Edelstein.

Yerachmiel Gershon Edelstein (Hebrew: ירחמיאל גרשון אדלשטיין; 18 April 1923 – 30 May 2023) was a Soviet-born Israeli Haredi rabbi who was rosh yeshiva of the Ponevezh Yeshiva, president of the Vaad Hayeshivos, and the spiritual leader of the Degel HaTorah party in Israel. He was widely considered to be a Gadol Hador by the Litvish community.

After the death of Rabbi Aharon Yehuda Leib Shteinman in late 2017, Rabbi Edelstein, together with Rabbi Chaim Kanievsky, led the Degel HaTorah movement, representing most of the Litvak-Haredi community. From March 2022, following the death of Rabbi Kanievsky, Rabbi Edelstein assumed sole leadership of the Litvak public.

== Biography ==
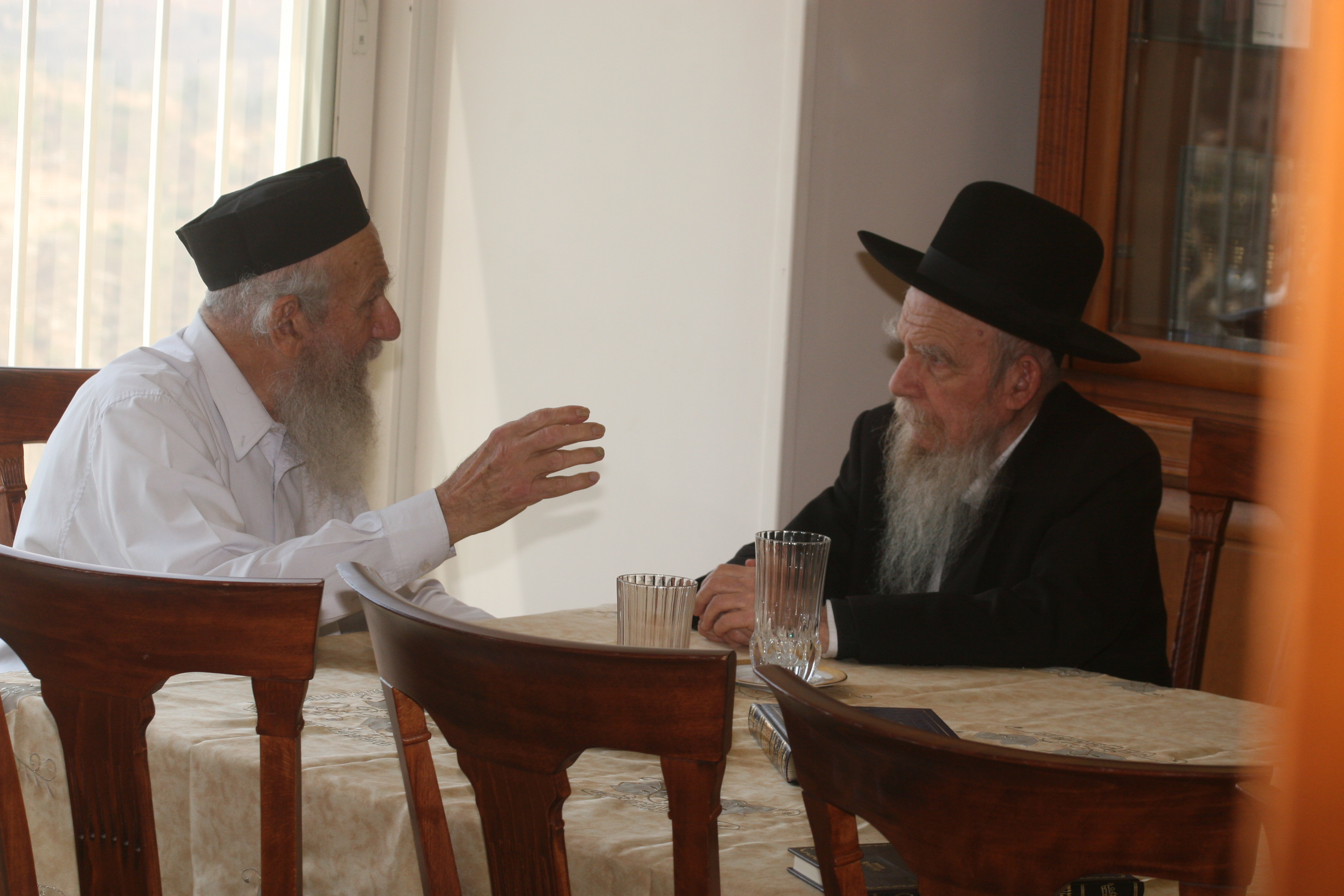
The rabbinic brothers, Rabbi Yaakov and Rabbi Gershon Edelstein.

Edelstein was born in the town of Shumyachi (Shumyatch) near Smolensk, in the Soviet Union, to Rabbi Tzvi Yehuda Edelstein, the city's rabbi and son of Rabbi Yerachmiel Gershon Edelstein, author of Ben Aryeh on the Talmud, and to Miriam, daughter of Rabbi Mordechai Shlomo Movshovitz, rabbi of Melastovka.

His mother obtained falsified birth certificates with incorrect dates for her sons, marking them as three years younger than their actual ages so they would not be enrolled in state-supervised schools under the Yevsektsiya (the Yiddish-language branch of the Communist Party of the Soviet Union). He studied Torah under Rabbi Zalman Leib Estolin, a Chabadnik, in exchange for his father Rabbi Tzvi Yehuda tutoring Estolin in Gemara and Rishonim. After his mother fell ill with typhus, he and his younger brother, Rabbi Yaakov Edelstein, were sent to their aunt, Rebbetzin Rivka Tzivia Paz, in Klimovich, where they were raised by another Chabad rabbi, Rabbi Moshe Axelrod, who later sent them to study Torah secretly under Rabbi Mordechai Eliyahu Shneor, also a Chabad follower and disciple of their father. There, they received news of their mother's death.

In the month of Nisan 1934, their father secured a permit to emigrate to the Land of Israel, assisted by Rabbi Abraham Isaac Kook, and requested his sons return to Shumyachi. During this period, their grandmother Rebbetzin Raizel managed the household and raised the brothers, allowing their father to focus on Torah study. In the month of Iyar 1934, the family traveled on the ship "Novo Russia" from Odessa to the Land of Israel, arriving on Lag B'Omer. The family traveled to Jerusalem, where they visited Rabbi Isser Zalman Meltzer and Rabbi Kook, who had studied together with their grandfather, Rabbi Yerachmiel Gershon Edelstein, at the Volozhin Yeshiva.

In Elul 5694 (1934), after several months of moving between relatives, their father settled the family in Ramat HaSharon. Since there was no religious school in Ramat HaSharon, their father taught the boys at home, using crates of oranges as desks due to a lack of furniture. They studied Gemara with Rosh and Rif, and for some tractates, also the Tur and Beit Yosef. On Shabbat, they studied Rambam on topics related to the tractate. The brothers also learned grammar, arithmetic, and English, which was the official language at the time, with a special tutor brought to their home.

In 1935 (5695), their father was appointed as the local rabbi. Towards Elul 5702, the sons were sent to Lomza Yeshiva following Gershon's encouragement. They walked from their home to the yeshiva in Petach Tikvah on the first of Elul, unaware that the term had begun the previous day. The mashgiach, Rabbi Avraham Abba Grossbard, said he had no room left for them. Shlomo Zalman Moses, the yeshiva's secretary (father of Menachem Eliezer Moses), met them and invited them to sleep at his home until beds were found for them at the yeshiva in early Cheshvan. Following their father's instruction, they joined the study group of Rabbi Shmuel Rozovsky.

A year later, their father remarried to Rachel, and he asked his sons to return, explaining that with the rebbetzin now taking on household responsibilities, they could focus on their studies without interruption. The brothers resumed their study routine with their father. In the winter of 5704 (1943–1944), when the Ponevezh Yeshiva was established, Rabbi Shmuel Rozovsky, who had been appointed as a head of the yeshiva, asked their father to have them join the founding group of the yeshiva. They were among the first six students at the yeshiva, which was then located in the Ligman Synagogue in Bnei Brak, with the students staying in rented rooms around the city. The two younger brothers stayed in the home of Rabbi Michel Yehuda Lefkowitz, who rented out his only bedroom to the yeshiva.

The founder of the yeshiva, Rabbi Yosef Shlomo Kahaneman, appointed him to teach Holocaust survivor students who had arrived at the orphanage institution "Batei Avot." In 5706 (1946), he was appointed to give lectures to younger students at the yeshiva. In 5708 (1948), he married Hennie Rachel, daughter of Rabbi Yehoshua Zelig Diskin, rabbi of Pardes Hanna (she died on 14 Tishrei 5762), and in that same year, Rabbi Kahaneman appointed him as a teacher (ram) at the yeshiva.

Rabbi Edelstein was close to Rabbi Avrohom Yeshaya Karelitz, known as the Chazon Ish. After the death of his father on the 20th of Cheshvan 5711 (1950), he deliberated whether to take on the position of Rabbi of Ramat HaSharon. However, as he was already holding a position at the yeshiva and due to his wife's refusal to relocate from Bnei Brak, the role was assigned to his brother, Rabbi Yaakov Edelstein.

In the mid-1990s, succession disputes emerged within the Ponevezh Yeshiva. Following a ruling from a rabbinical court on the matter, Rabbi Edelstein began delivering a general lecture (shiur klali) to the students in Iyar 5760 (2000), effectively becoming a Rosh Yeshiva along with Rabbi Baruch Dov Povarsky. Later, Rabbi Shmuel Markovitz also joined them.

Due to the ongoing dispute, Rabbi Edelstein led the yeshiva's split into two factions. Today, the Ponevezh Yeshiva complex houses two yeshivas: one led by Rabbi Edelstein (alongside Rabbi Povarsky) until his death, and the other headed by Rabbi Markovitz. His yeshiva's Shabbat and holiday prayers take place in the "Ohel Kedoshim" building and not in the main yeshiva hall.

In 5763 (2003), Rabbi Edelstein was appointed to the Council of Torah Sages of the Degel HaTorah party.

In 5761 (2001), during one of Rabbi Edelstein's lectures, students opposing him disrupted the session in an attempt to halt it. Rabbi Aharon Yehuda Leib Shteinman sent him a letter expressing protest against those who disrespected Rabbi Edelstein's Torah stature, with an added request to forgive them. In 5768 (2008), opponents threw a cup of yogurt at him from a building window. Following this, a rally of support was held at his yeshiva, attended by Rabbis Chaim Kanievsky, Michel Yehuda Lefkowitz and Nissim Karelitz. Rabbi Shteinman sent a letter to the gathering.

After his wife's death, Rabbi Edelstein established a class on the Order of Taharot at his home on Saturday nights in her memory.

Rabbi Edelstein served as the baal tokeah (shofar blower) at the Ponevezh Yeshiva from 1946 until Rosh Hashanah of his last year. Following his death, the role was transferred to his son, Rabbi Yisrael Edelstein, one of the heads of the Beit Midrash Elyon Yeshiva.

=== Death and funeral ===
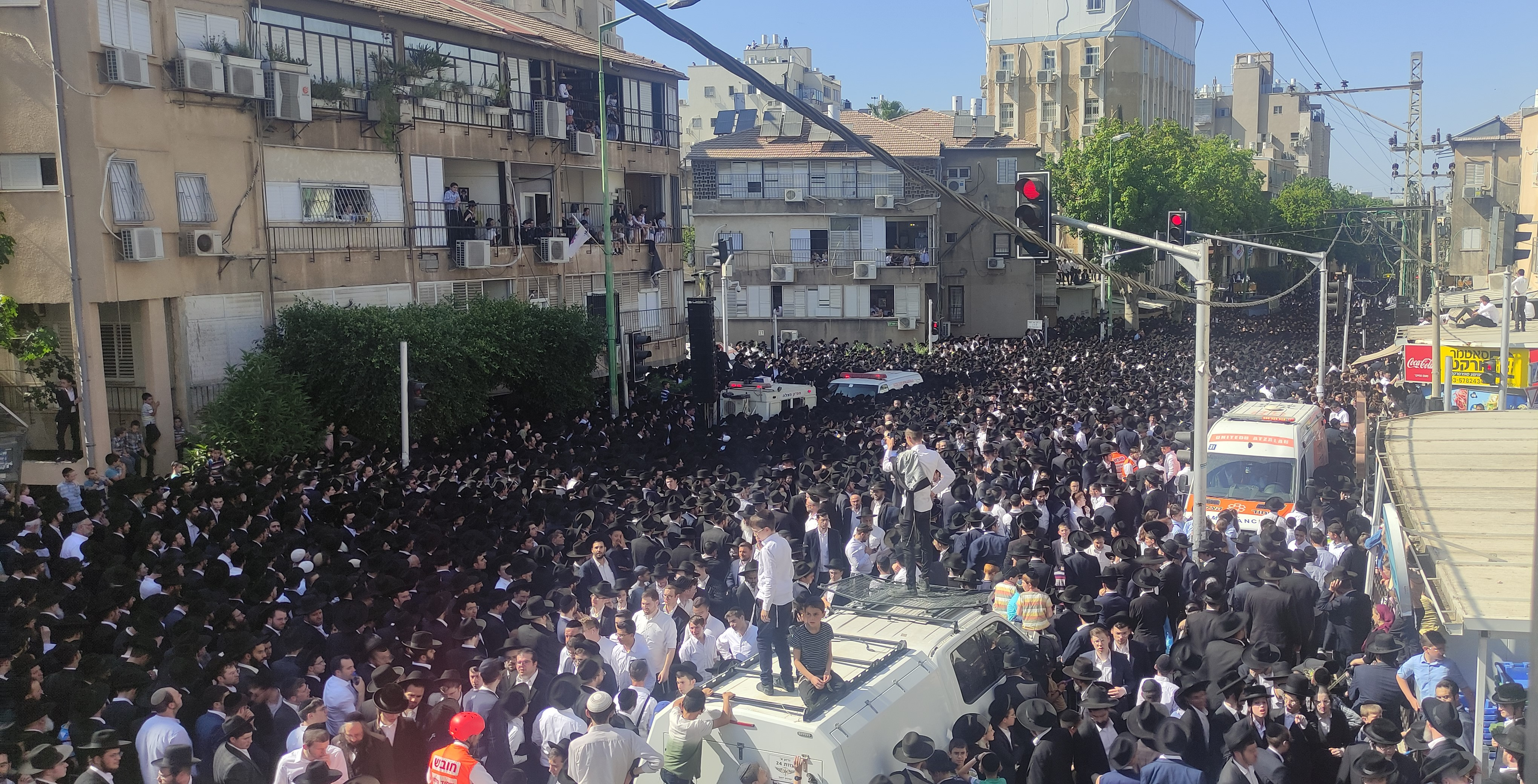
Funeral of Rabbi Gershon Edelstein

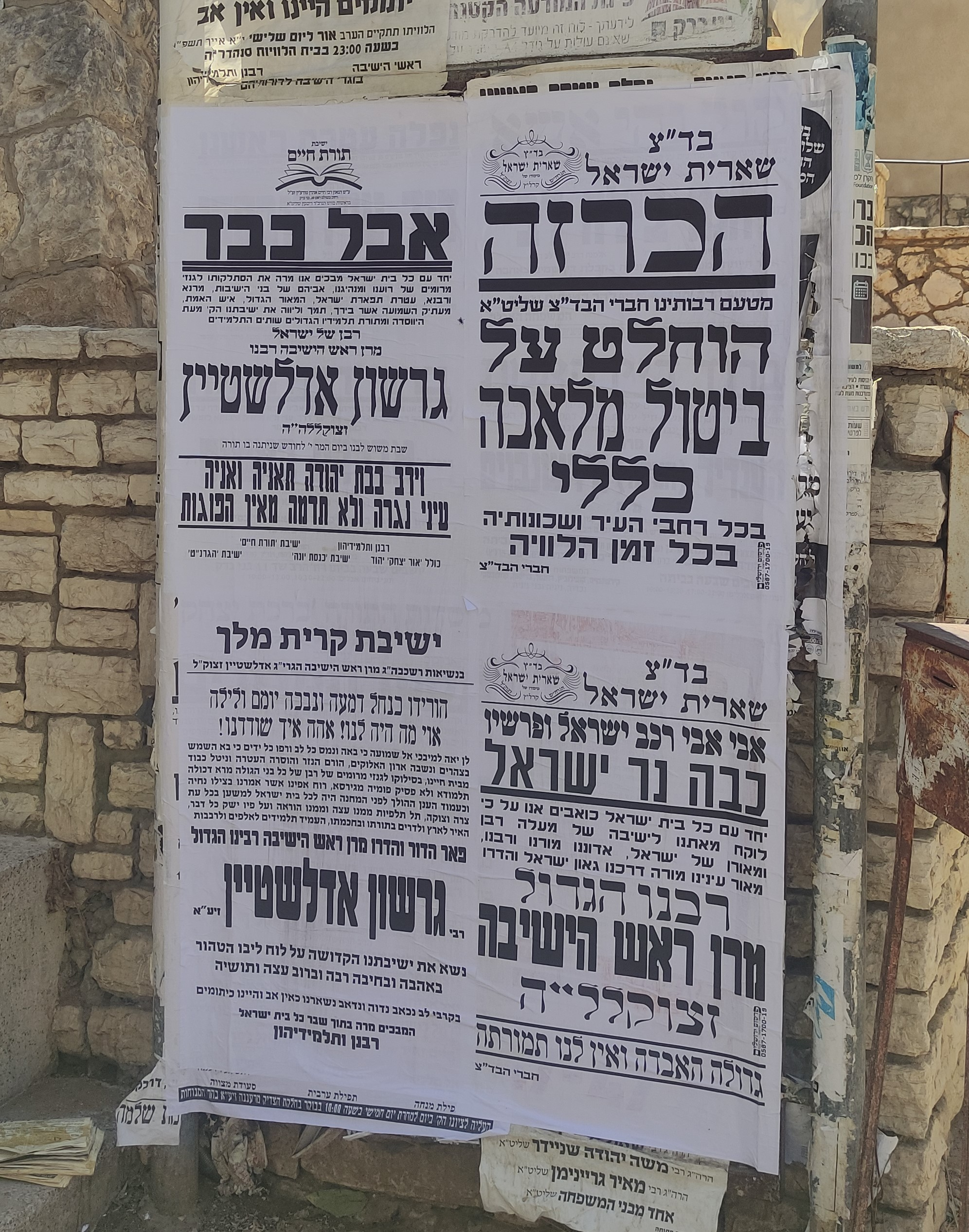
Obituary notices in Bnei Brak on the day of his funeral.

In May 2023, during the holiday of Shavuot, Rabbi Edelstein was admitted to Mayanei Hayeshua Medical Center in Bnei Brak due to breathing difficulties. A few days later, his condition worsened, and on the morning of Tuesday, the 10th of Sivan, 5783 (30 May 2023), he died at the age of 100.

His funeral took place on the day of his death in Bnei Brak, starting from the Ponevezh Yeshiva hall and proceeding to the Ponevezh Yeshiva cemetery. According to police estimates, around 200,000 people attended.

== Views ==
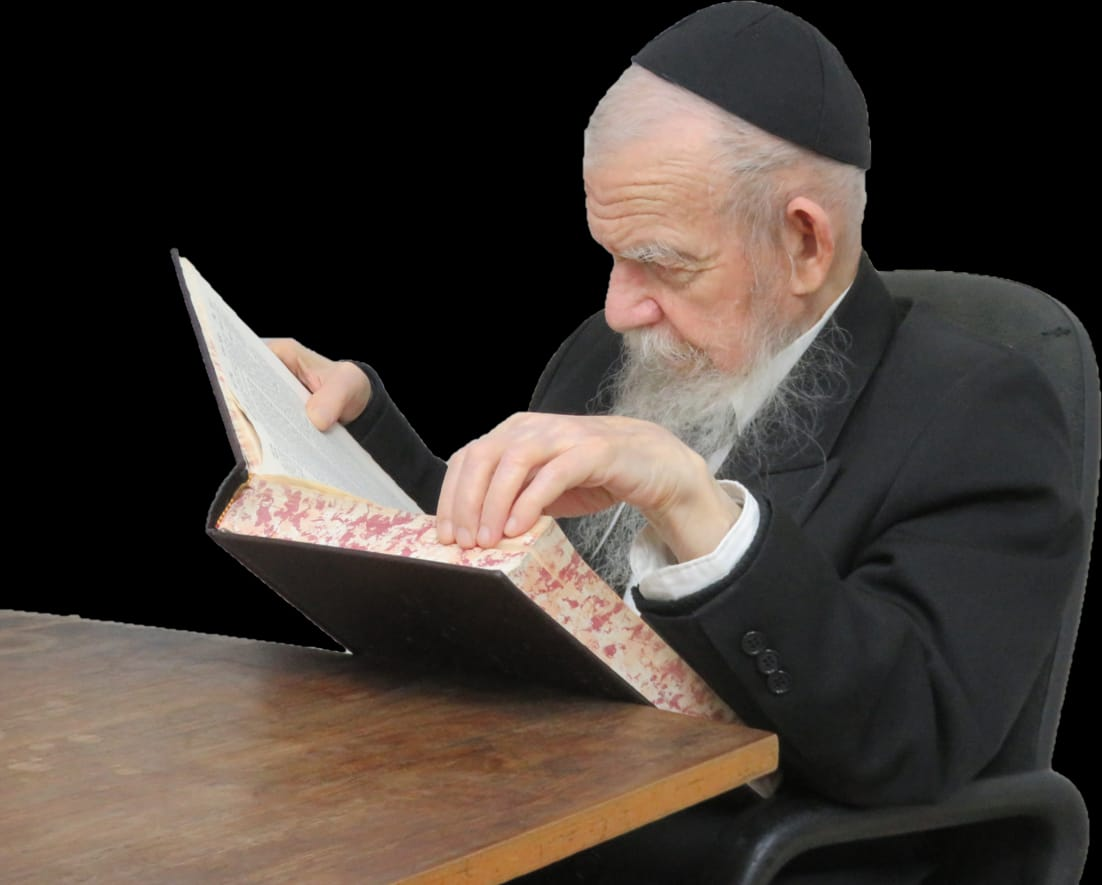

=== Torah ===
Rabbi Edelstein held the view that study should be adapted to each student's nature. According to him, when the style of learning aligns with the learner's character, their enjoyment and satisfaction increase, making it easier to persevere in study over the years, in line with the Litvak ideal. He also believed that most students benefit more from a fast pace of study, covering many pages. Additionally, he considered acquiring familiarity and expanding knowledge essential for forming sound logic and a proper understanding of Talmudic discussions, providing greater satisfaction for the learner. Rabbi Edelstein also emphasized the importance of studying mussar (ethical literature). In most of his talks, he encouraged the importance of mussar study, even mentioning its necessity in the eulogy he gave for Rabbi Chaim Kanievsky, noting the benefits it brings to a person's character and all areas of life. He also stressed that mussar study should be done joyfully and with books that interest the individual.

=== Education and family ===
Rabbi Edelstein encouraged educators to form personal connections with their students, which he considered the foundation for instilling a love of Torah in children.

He opposed extreme behaviors that harm natural relationships between individuals and their surroundings. In a talk to married yeshiva students (avreichim), he said:

Sometimes people behave unnaturally due to various calculations and mistakes, such as someone immersed in their studies who avoids trivial conversation, to the extent that they overlook proper consideration for their family and those around them. There was a case of a young man deeply immersed in his studies who avoided any trivial talk. When he returned home, he would eat, rest, and immediately return to his studies. It was pointed out to him that this was not the right approach; he needed to show interest in his family’s well-being and give attention to those in need. He started doing this, and his life became much happier. Every family man is committed to his family, needs to dedicate time to them, and listen to what his wife wants to share with him, as the Sages said (Kiddushin 49b), ‘Women took nine measures of speech,’ and a woman needs someone to speak with. ("Darkei Hachizuk" Bulletin, No. 142)

He strongly and consistently emphasized the need to educate children with kindness, avoiding coercion or creating a negative atmosphere. He believed that by explaining things to children, they come to understand what is right and good, and when they struggle, forcing them only causes a negative reaction. The correct approach, he said, is to encourage and create motivation. When asked about parents' insistence on teenagers who miss the times for Kriyat Shema and tefillah, he stressed, "With kindness! Without coercion!" When further asked if they should "nag" them, he launched into an unusually long response:

“No, no, no, no, no, don’t nag them [...] Coercion creates a negative reaction, you must not force a child; coercion results in the opposite of education. Education should be only in an interesting, friendly, and loving way [...] Only with kindness! They should not even feel that there is criticism on them [...] If they feel the criticism, it hurts them deeply [...] This is an important principle in education”.

He viewed those who left religious observance (yotzim beshe'ela) and "dropouts" as "tinokot she'nishbu" (literally, "captured infants"), calling for them to be "treated with honor and friendliness." He strongly opposed any approach that alienates them from the family or scolds them, and went so far as to emphasize the obligation to embrace them within the family, even more so than other children. He advised providing them with financial support, even for needs like clothing that might not align with religious standards, alongside an effort to inspire change through gentle persuasion.

He advised men struggling with shalom bayit (marital harmony) to follow what he called "silence and respect," meaning: the husband should remain silent when his wife expresses dissatisfaction or anger toward him, and should not respond so as to avoid escalating a conflict. Additionally, he advised always showing respect in all circumstances, which, he said, would lead to a happy and loving marital life. He frequently emphasized in his weekly talks that even if one spouse is angry with the other, they must not raise their voice, as self-restraint prevents anger both in marital relationships and interactions with others.

=== IDF soldiers and secular Jews ===
In 2012, during a class, he remarked:

“Even secular Jews who do not observe Torah and mitzvot, if they risk their lives to save others out of love for humanity, they have a share in the World to Come, like the Harugei Lod (martyrs of Lod) who sacrificed themselves for the welfare of the city's residents. What is nationalism? It's love for the people. Secular soldiers in the army risk their lives to save others. What, are they not like the martyrs of Lod? If a secular Jew is willing to risk his life more than a Haredi, he is greater than him.”

The statement sparked controversy and led to delegations pressing him to retract it, but he refused. On another occasion, he emphasized that even a non-believing Jew, if he sacrifices himself for other Jews, will enter the World to Come. He added that "even if he did so out of nationalism," Jewish nationalism differs from "the nationalism of the nations" as it is "love for one’s fellow Jews" and is blessed.

In response to public discourse in Israel that occasionally highlighted negative attitudes toward Haredim and religion, he stated in a talk:

“In this time, when there are agitators and critics against those who keep Torah and mitzvot, we must remember that most secular people are not hateful and have a very positive attitude. Even those who incite often have good qualities and are usually motivated by external factors, like not experiencing a welcoming approach.”

He added that sometimes incitement arises from those who believe that Haredim hate them, as the Tosefta explained about Rabbi Akiva, who, when he was an am ha'aretz (unlearned person), said, "Give me a scholar, and I would bite him like a donkey," even though he had good qualities. This was because he mistakenly thought scholars hated him, whereas in truth, "scholars hate the sin, not the sinners."

=== Public leadership ===
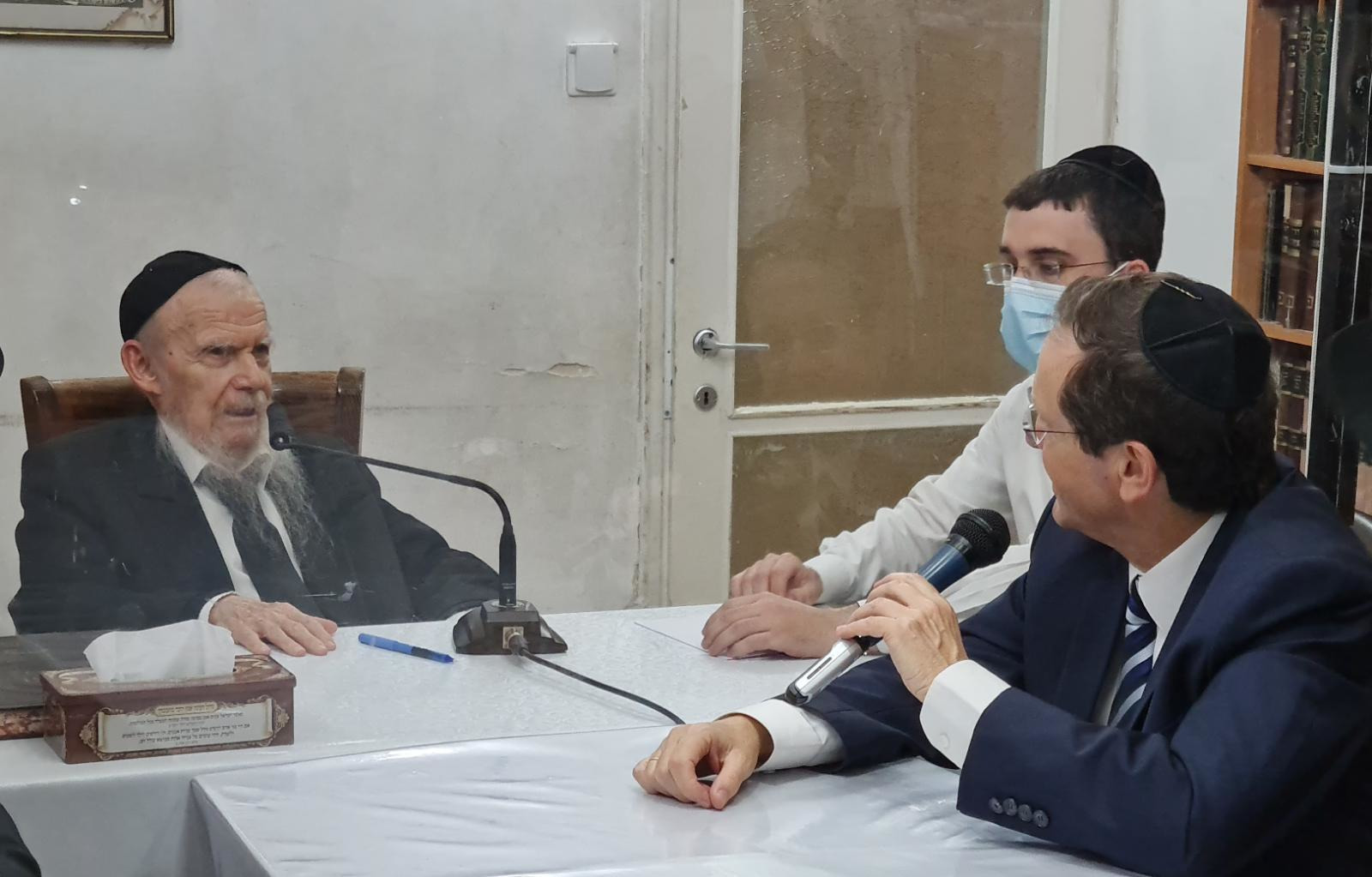
President Isaac Herzog visiting Rabbi Edelstein in 2021

During the COVID-19 pandemic, Rabbi Edelstein took a strict approach to preventing the spread of the virus, and early on he prohibited prayer in a minyan (prayer quorum) due to the risk of infection.

Rabbi Edelstein opposed the current operations of the Rabbinical Committee for Communications, due to claims that it was blocking necessary content for the Haredi public without consulting its leaders. However, he refrained for many years from establishing an alternative committee, and only in his final days did he give his blessing for such a step. On the morning of his death, a statement about this was published in the Yated Ne'eman newspaper, associated with his followers.

=== The land of Israel ===
Rabbi Edelstein believed that the prophecy of redemption in Ezekiel Chapter 36 was being fulfilled in his days, asserting that God was keeping the promise of Ingathering of the Exiles to sanctify his name and was rebuilding the Land of Israel. Moreover, he stated that it was now guaranteed that the Jewish people would never go into exile again, as per Ezekiel's words, "You will live in the land that I gave to your ancestors." He explained, based on the prophet's words, that redemption begins for the sake of sanctifying God's name even before Am Yisrael (the people of Israel) has fully repented. This repentance, he said, would come later through learning the "Torah of the land of Israel," which he described as a unique level of Torah study that one merits upon returning from exile, thanks to the holiness of the land of Israel. He interpreted this as the prophet's promise, "And I will sprinkle clean water upon you," which, he explained, was being realized through the great proliferation of Torah in the land today, where even students from abroad come to study and feel a higher level of Torah. Through this, he said, the Jewish people would be inspired toward complete repentance, thereby meriting the full realization of the redemption.

== Family ==
His brother, Rabbi Yaakov Edelstein, served as the rabbi of Ramat HaSharon.

His half-brother, Rabbi Shlomo Edelstein, was a lecturer at the Bobov Yeshiva in Bat Yam, head of "Noam HaTorah" Yeshiva in Modiin Illit, head of the "Nishmat Yisrael" Kollel in Paris, France, and head of the "Ahavat Aharon" Yeshiva in Bnei Brak.

His brother-in-law, Rabbi Reuven Yosef Gershonowitz (married to his sister Pesia), served as the head of the Hemdat Shmuel Yeshiva in Hemed and Yeshivat HaNegev in Netivot.

Another brother-in-law, Rabbi Yitzhak David Breitstein (married to his half-sister Shoshana Rivka), served as the safra d'dayanei (scribe to the judges) in the Badatz (Haredi court) of the Edah HaChareidis in Jerusalem.

His brother-in-law, Rabbi Shimon Moshe Diskin, was a lecturer at Kol Torah Yeshiva and authored the Mas’at HaMelech series.

Another brother-in-law, Rabbi Yosef Diskin, was one of the heads of Tiferet Zion Yeshiva.

He married Henia Rachel, daughter of Rabbi Yehoshua Zelig Diskin, rabbi of Pardes Hanna. She died on 14 Tishrei 5762 (2001).

- His daughter, Meira, married Rabbi David Levi, one of the heads of Ponevezh Yeshiva, and formerly a lecturer at Yeshivat Rabbeinu Chaim Ozer. Their son-in-law, Rabbi Aharon Weiss, son of Rabbi Yisrael Meir Weiss, is a lecturer at Mir Yeshiva Modiin Illit.
- His son, Rabbi Tzvi Yehuda, is the head of Orchot Torah Yeshiva in Bnei Brak.
- His son, Rabbi Bezalel, was the head of "Ahavat Aharon" Yeshiva. He died on 16 Tishrei 5784, approximately four months after his father's death.
- His son, Rabbi Yisrael, is a lecturer at Beit Midrash Elyon Yeshiva in Bnei Brak.
- His son, Rabbi Shimon Yosef, predeceased him in 2018.
- His daughter, Billa, married Rabbi Avraham Yeshayahu Adler, a lecturer at Yeshivat Rabbeinu Chaim Ozer.
- His daughter, Shoshana, married Rabbi Itamar Garboz, head of Orchot Torah Yeshiva.

His uncles were Rabbi Binyamin Movshowitz, rabbi of Herzliya; Rabbi Mordechai Shmuel Karol, rabbi of the village Kfar Hasidim; and Rabbi Yehuda Yitzchak Berman, rabbi in Klintsy and Tel Aviv.

His cousins include Rabbi Mordechai Shlomo Berman, one of the heads of the Ponevezh Yeshiva; Rabbi Eliyahu Eliezer Mishkovsky, rabbi of Kfar Hasidim and head of Yeshivat Knesset Hizkiyahu; Rabbi Yitzhak Yechiel Yaakovowitz, rabbi of Herzliya; Rabbi Yaakov Nissan Rosenthal, head of the rabbinical court in Haifa; and Rabbi Shlomo Noach Karoll, rabbi of the moshav Hemed.

== Works ==
- Mimeged Geresh Yerachim – On the Talmud Bavli, compiled from his lectures at the yeshiva.
- Notes and Commentaries on the Order of the Rambam – Published in 2012, edited by his students.
- Notes and Commentaries on the Shas – Began publication from 5781.

Starting around the year 2000, printed booklets of his lectures, edited by his students, began to appear. In this series:

- Shiurei Rabbi Gershon – On the tractates studied at the Ponevezh Yeshiva.
- Shiurei HaGrig – Rabbi Gershon Edelstein's lectures on tractates including Yevamot, Ketubot, Bava Kamma, and Bava Metzia.
- Zikhron Yaakov – Rabbi Gershon Edelstein's lectures (and those of Rabbi Baruch Dov Povarsky) on chapters 2, 3, and 8 of the tractate Bava Batra.
- Asifat Shemot – Collection of articles and lectures on holiday-related topics.
- Darka Shel Torah – On the study methodology.
- Kuntres Da'at Mevinim – On study methods.
- Pitgam HaMelekh – On the festival of Purim.
- Ananei Kavod – On the festival of Sukkot.
- Hotamo Shel Kohen Gadol – On the days of Hanukkah.
- Darkei HaChizuk – Pirkei Hadracha (Guidance Chapters) – 5778; and Darkei HaChizuk – Inyanei Tzibbur (Public Matters), 5781. A collection from his weekly lectures to students in his home. These and other lectures are published in a weekly pamphlet titled Darkei HaChizuk.

Since 5779, a weekly bulletin featuring selected teachings of his has been published under the title Mimeged Geresh Yerachim.
