= Nissim Karelitz =

Israeli rabbi

Rabbi Shmaryahu Yosef Nissim Karelitz
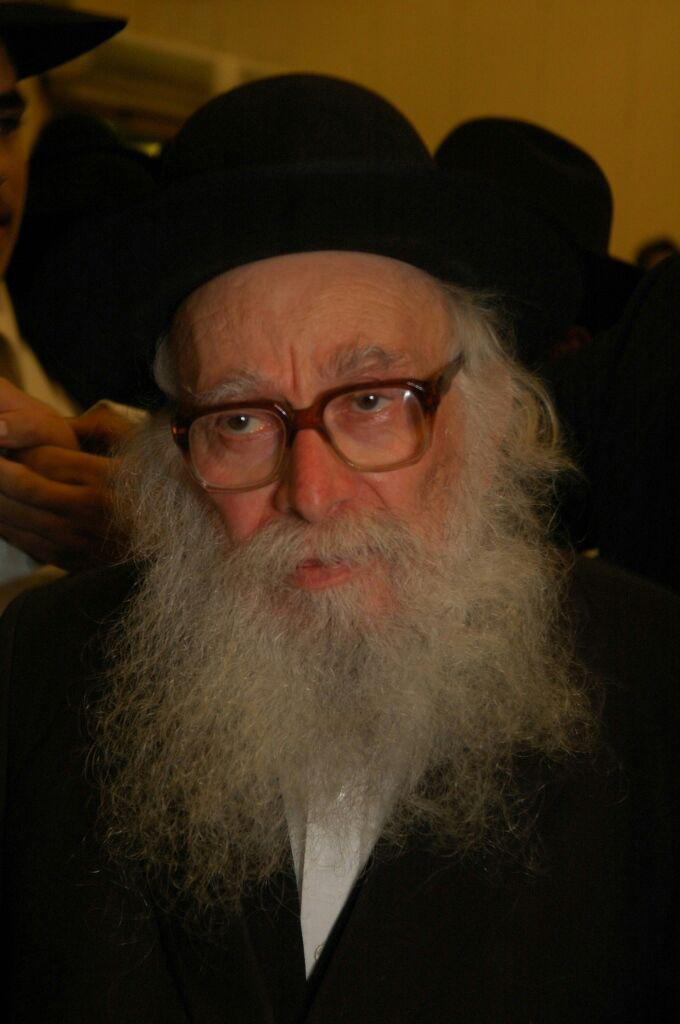
- Rabbi Nissim Karelitz in 2012

Chairman of the Beis Din Tzedek of Bnei Brak

Member of the Vaad Halacha of Maayanei Hayeshua Hospital

Personal details
- Born: July 19, 1926 Kosava, Vilnius province, Poland (now Belarus)
- Died: October 21, 2019 (aged 93) Bnei Brak, Israel
- Spouse: Leah Karelitz (d. 2015)
- Education: Ponevezh Yeshiva
- Occupation: Orthodox Jewish rabbi, posek
- Known for: Chut Shani series on Jewish law

Shmaryahu Yosef Nissim Karelitz (Hebrew: נסים קרליץ; July 19, 1926 – October 21, 2019) was an Orthodox Jewish rabbi and posek who served as the chairman of the beis din tzedek (rabbinical court) of Bnei Brak.

== Biography ==
Karelitz was born in 1926 in Kosava (Kossov), Vilnius province, Poland, presently in Belarus. He came to Israel in 1935 with his parents.

Karelitz was a nephew of Rabbi Avrohom Yeshaya Karelitz, known as the Chazon Ish. (The latter's sister was Karelitz's mother). The Chazon Ish was a previous rabbinical spiritual leader of Bnei Brak. From the time of the Chazon Ish until Karelitz it was Rav Elazar Shach who was regarded as the pre-eminent leader.

In his youth, he studied in the Ponevezh Yeshiva. He also studied with his uncles, the Chazon Ish and the Steipler. His wife Leah (d. 2015) was the daughter of Rabbi Tzvi Hirsch Kopshitz of Jerusalem and the great-granddaughter of Rabbi Yosef Chaim Sonnenfeld.

Karelitz died in Bnei Brak on October 21, 2019. His funeral was attended by tens of thousands, and he was eulogized by Rabbi Chaim Kanievsky, his first cousin, and by Rabbi Gershon Edelstein, Rosh Yeshiva of Ponevezh.

== Rabbinic career ==
His rabbinical court handled various matters, including financial disputes, marriage conflicts, and conversions. He was also a member of the Vaad Halacha (Jewish legal council) of the Maayanei Hayeshua Hospital of Bnei Brak and the av beis din of the Bnei Brak neighborhood of Ramat Aharon. Karelitz's beit din in Israel performs conversions on people who are residing illegally in the state of Israel. This means several things: (1) The conversion process goes against Israeli law which gives the state more reason to reject such conversions. (2) The converts, who often live many years illegally in Israel, are eventually forced to leave (deportation, or due to lack of financial means to support oneself).

== Published works ==
=== Chut Shani ===
- Hilchos Shabbos Vol. 1
- Hilchos Shabbos Vol. 3
- Hilchos Yom Tov
- Hilchos Pesach
- Hilchos Niddah
- Hilchos Ribbis
- Even Ha'ezer Siman 21
- Hilchos Shmita ViYovel Vol. 1-2
