= Karelitz =

Karelitz (Yiddish: קארעליץ, Hebrew: קרליץ) may refer to:

- Yiddish name of Karelichy (also Korelits, Korelitsh)
- Avrohom Yeshaya Karelitz (1878–1953)
- Nissim Karelitz, the chairman of the beis din tzedek (rabbinical court) of Bnei Brak
