= Shumyachi =

Shumyachi Шумячи
- Settlement
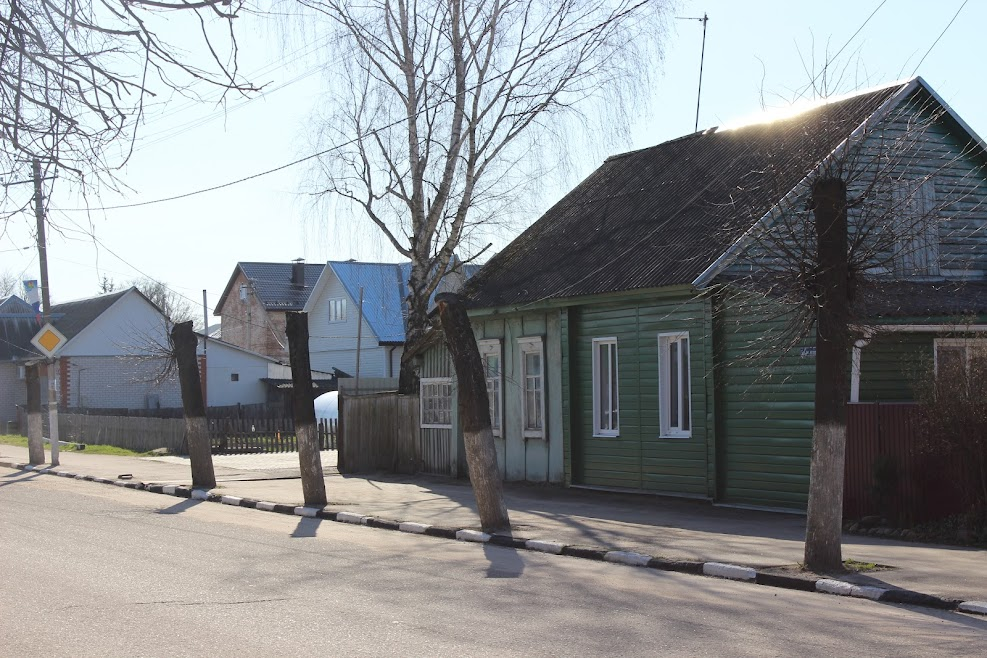
- Interactive map of Shumyachi
- Location of Shumyachi Shumyachi (Smolensk Oblast)
- Country: Russia
- Federal subject: Smolensk Oblast
- Administrative district: Shumyachsky District
- Urban settlementSelsoviet: Shumyachskoye
- Founded: 1587
- Urban-type settlement status since: 1965

Population (2010 Census)
  - Total: 4,227
  - Estimate (2024): 2,995 (−29.1%)

Administrative status
  - Capital of: Shumyachsky District

Municipal status
  - Municipal district: Shumyachsky Municipal District
  - Urban settlement: Shumyachskoye Urban Settlement
  - Capital of: Shumyachsky Municipal District
- Time zone: UTC+3 (MSK)
- Postal code: 216410
- OKTMO ID: 66656151051

Shumyachi (Russian: Шумячи; Belarusian: Шумячы) is an urban locality (an urban-type settlement) and the administrative center of Shumyachsky District of Smolensk Oblast, Russia. Population: 4,227 (2010 census); 4,731 (2002 census); 5,724 (1989 Soviet census).

== History ==
Shumyachi is first mentioned in 1587 when it belonged to Poland. In 1772, as a result of the First Partition of Poland, it was transferred to Russia and included in the newly established Mogilev Governorate. It belonged to Klimovichsky Uyezd. In 1919, Mogilev Governorate was abolished, and the area was transferred to Gomel Governorate. In 1922, it was included to Roslavlsky Uyezd of Smolensk Governorate.

On 12 July 1929, governorates and uyezds were abolished, and Shumyachsky District with the administrative center in the settlement of Shumyachi was established. The district belonged to Roslavl Okrug of Western Oblast. On August 1, 1930, the okrugs were abolished, and the districts were subordinated directly to the oblast. On 27 September 1937 Western Oblast was abolished and split between Oryol and Smolensk Oblasts. Shumyachsky District was transferred to Smolensk Oblast. Between August 1941 and 1943, during WWII, the district was occupied by German troops. In 1965, Shumyachi was granted the urban-type settlement status.

== Economy ==
The enterprises in the district produce peat, glass, as well as there are several enterprises of food industry.

== Transportation ==
Shumyachi has access to the A130 highway (the "Warsaw Highway") which connects Moscow with Babruysk via Obninsk, Roslavl, and Krychaw. There are also local roads with bus traffic originating from Shumyachi. The closest railway station to Shumyachi Ponyatovka railway station, about 10 kilometres (6.2 mi) south of Shumyachi. It is on the railway connecting Roslavl and Krychaw; there is no passenger traffic.

== Culture ==
In Shumyachi, there is a local museum.

== Notable people ==
- Gershon Edelstein
