= Yitzhak Yaakov Rabinovich =

Yitzhak Yaakov Rabinovich rav
- יצחק יעקב ראבינאוויטשן

Personal life
- Born: 1854 Shereshevo, Russian Empire
- Died: February 21, 1919 (aged 64–65) Panevėžys, Lithuania
- Political party: Agudat Yisrael
- Occupation: Rabbi, Talmudic scholar

Religious life
- Religion: Orthodox Judaism
- Temple: Ponevezh Yeshiva
- Founder of: founder and rosh yeshiva of Ponevezh Yeshiva
- Profession: rabbi, scholar

Yitzhak Yaakov Rabinovich (1854–1919), יצחק יעקב ראבינאוויטש, known also as reb Itzele Ponevezher, was an Orthodox rabbi, supporter of socialist ideas and founder of the Ponevezh Yeshiva.

== Biography ==
Yitzhak Yaakov Rabinovich was born in 1854 in Shereshevo, Belorussia into a wealthy family of merchants. He received private education of Talmud and at the age of 14 moved out of home to Selets in order to study with Yeruham Perlman — who later became noted rabbi of Minsk. A few years later Rabinovich, together with Chaim Soloveitchik moved to Brest-Litovsk. While studying together the two of them developed new method of studying Talmud: by logic and deep understanding of text - in contrast to the previously long-used method of pilpul (casuistry).

In 1889, Rabinovich was appointed a teacher at the Slobodka yeshiva. However, due to challenges in accepting Musar ideology that the school followed, he left in 1894 and became a rabbi in Gorzd, Lithuania. Two years later (in 1896) he settled in Ponevezh taking the position of rabbi in the town. His predecessor was Eliyahu David Rabinowitz-Teomim, the father-in-law of Avraham Yitzhak Kook.

In 1909 he received a substantial amount of money from a Moscow Jew, Liba Miriam Gavronskii, daughter of Kalonymus Wissotzky - tea magnate, who wanted to commemorate her husband by opening religious school for promising male students. The money was sufficient to open a kollel, however its popularity, high level of studying but also amount of received grant made it possible to turn this kollel to a yeshiva. Rabinovich held the position of rosh yeshiva at this Ponevezh yeshiva.

Rabinovich found it difficult to fund-raise - which was one of the traditional tasks of head of yeshiva. That is why in 1913 he refused the offer to become head of Etz Haim Yeshiva in Jerusalem. In the yeshiva in Ponevezh, which was offering generous scholarships to its students, he had not had the problem of fundraising as the yeshiva had its own founding sponsor.

Rabinovich is considered progressive in his social and public affairs opinions. In 1910 at the rabbinical congress in Saint Petersburg he supported a resolution which demanded rabbis in Russian empire to know the local language of the country. In 1912 he has supported the newly established Orthodox party Agudat Israel and was elected to the rabbinical council of the party.

After lecture of Capital by Karl Marx, Rabinovich turned to further support working class. In 1917, at the meeting of Masoret ve-Herut (Orthodox leaders), he proposed a resolution to endorse redistribution of land to peasants. However his proposal did not reach enough support to be accepted by the meeting.

Although his teachings and halachic rulings gained wide support and respect, he never published his responsa and novellae. Some of them were preserved by his students and in letters his correspondents received.

In 1915, Rabinovich with his students were forced (by approaching Germans and by Russian policy towards Jews) to flee to Latvia and then to Ukraine. After the end of World War I, in 1919, he returned to Ponevezh, but due to Bolsheviks ruling the town, he was unable to teach nor to re-establish his yeshiva. Soon after that, on Friday, 21 Adar I, 5679 (21 February, 1919), he died of typhus.

== Heritage ==
His work and teachings found followers and outlived him. At the end of 1919, when Ponevezh returned to Lithuania, the Ponevezh yeshiva was re-opened with Yosef Shlomo Kahaneman as its rosh yeshiva and soon regained its prestige. Under Kahaneman's leadership the school incorporated Musar but the teaching curriculum still focused on the study of Talmud. Kahaneman was considered not only a respected Talmudist but also an effective fundraiser, both locally and in United States. The funds he gathered were mostly used on improving school facilities. The outbreak of World War II caught Kahaneman during his trip to British Mandate Palestine, where he decided to stay. However, he continued running the yeshiva from abroad. Students were able to continue their studies, even after the Red Army entered to town and seized the yeshiva's original building and several branches of yeshiva in different synagogues in town. The situation dramatically changed after the Nazis entered the town in June 1941. The school building was incorporated into the part of town that was turned into a ghetto, and yeshiva students were murdered only a few days after the Nazi occupation started. In 1944, in British Mandate Palestine, in the new town of Bnei Brak, Kahaneman re-established the Ponevezh yeshiva, which is still considered one of the leading Litvishe yeshivas in Israel. The current yeshiva still uses the Ponevezh Yeshiva name after its original location and to commemorate the murdered community of its town of origin.

== See also ==
- Lithuanian Jews
- Ponevezh yeshiva
