= Rachel Factor =

American singer (born 1968)

- Born: Christine Frances Masave Horii; 1968 (age 57–58); Honolulu, Hawaii, United States
- Education: Punahou School
- Occupations: Dancer; singer; actress; teacher; director; choreographer
- Years active: 1990–present
- Spouse: Tovia (Todd) Factor (married 2000-2021)
- Musical career
- Genres: Jewish music, pop, Broadway, musical theatre
- Website: rachel-factor.com

Rachel Factor (born Christine Frances Masave Horii; 1968; Honolulu, Hawaii) is an American Orthodox Jewish singer, dancer, actress, and performing-arts instructor. Before converting to Judaism, she performed with The Rockettes and appeared in several Broadway musicals. Since becoming Jewish, she has performed for all-female audiences in several one-woman shows and has been involved in a number of projects promoting artistic expression among Orthodox women.

== Biography ==
=== Early life and career ===
Born Christine Frances Masave Horii, Factor is a fourth-generation Japanese-American. She attended the Punahou School, where she discovered an affinity for dance. She began performing in the community theater, and at age 18 moved to Los Angeles to pursue a dance career in music videos, film, and television. She worked as a back-up dancer for Jody Watley and Belinda Carlisle and appeared in over 40 television commercials. She then moved to New York, where she performed as a Rockette at Radio City Music Hall, in off-Broadway productions, and in Broadway shows including Shogun: The Musical and Miss Saigon.

=== Conversion to Judaism ===
Factor was raised in a Protestant family. At age 29, she fell in love with Todd Factor, a Jewish television commercial producer, who told her that he had to marry someone Jewish. At first she was hesitant about converting, but decided to look into Judaism and was interested in what she learned. She studied for and underwent a Conservative conversion before her marriage and afterwards lived as a secular Jew, continuing to perform in the theater. However, until after the birth of her first child in 2002, and the child's circumcision by an Orthodox mohel, she and her husband began moving toward an Orthodox lifestyle. After Factor and her 8-month-old son underwent Orthodox conversions, she changed her name to Rachel and she and her husband moved to Jerusalem where he could study in a baal teshuva yeshiva.

=== Current career ===
After her Orthodox conversion, Factor chose to no longer perform in front of male audiences. She created for female-only audiences her first one-woman show, J.A.P. — a play on the term "Jewish American Princess", recounting her journey to Orthodoxy. J.A.P. had a 50-city, 4-month tour in the U.S. and Canada. Her second show, Not Even Normal, depicted her journey from Broadway performer to kollel wife. Her third show, Becoming Rich, explores the themes of faith and trust in God while living on a kollel salary.

In 2005 she opened the Jerusalem Women's Center for Theatre Arts (HaMachol Shel Bnos Miriam), a dance-and-wellness center in downtown Jerusalem.

In 2010, she opened Midreshes Shmuel, a post-high school women's Torah learning and performing arts program for two years, under the direction of Rabbi Binyomin Moskovits, Rosh Yeshiva of Midrash Shmuel Yeshiva. Her husband, who now goes by his Hebrew name, Tovia, was a member of the Midrash Shmuel kollel, but now learns at Kollel Ruach chaim. In summer 2010, she also directed a 5-week Dance and Touring Summer Program introducing Orthodox Jewish teenage girls to the performing arts along with tours of Israel.

== Discography ==
- K'Shoshana (2015)
- Tov Lehodot (2015)

== Credits ==
One-woman shows
Start year	Production	Notes
2001	J.A.P.	Chronicles Factor's journey to Judaism
2005	Not Even Normal	Chronicles her journey to observance
2008	Becoming Rich	Chronicles journey to "emunah and bitachon"
2010	Doors	Compilation of prior three shows through song and dance
2015	K'Shoshana	Premiered at Gerard Behar Center

Theatre
Start year	Production	Role	Notes
1990	Shōgun: The Musical	Slattern of the Hovel; Dancer; Sazuko (replacement)	As Tina Horii
1991	Miss Saigon	Swing (replacement)	As Tina Horii

Film and TV
Year	Title	Role	Notes
1996	ABC Afterschool Special	Dancer	Episode: "Through Thick & Thin" (as Tina Horii)
1997	Face	Genie	Short film (as Tina Horii)
2000	If You Only Knew	Bar Girl #3	As Tina Horaii
2001	Long Lost Love	Jennifer	As Tina Horii
