= Midrash Shmuel =

Midrash Shmuel may refer to:

- Midrash Shmuel (aggadah), an aggadic midrash on the Books of Samuel
- Midrash Shmuel Yeshiva, an English-speaking yeshiva in Jerusalem
- Midrash Shmuel, a sixteenth-century work by Rabbi Samuel ben Isaac de Uçeda
