= Elazar Shach =

Haredi rabbi (1899-2001)

- אלעזר שך
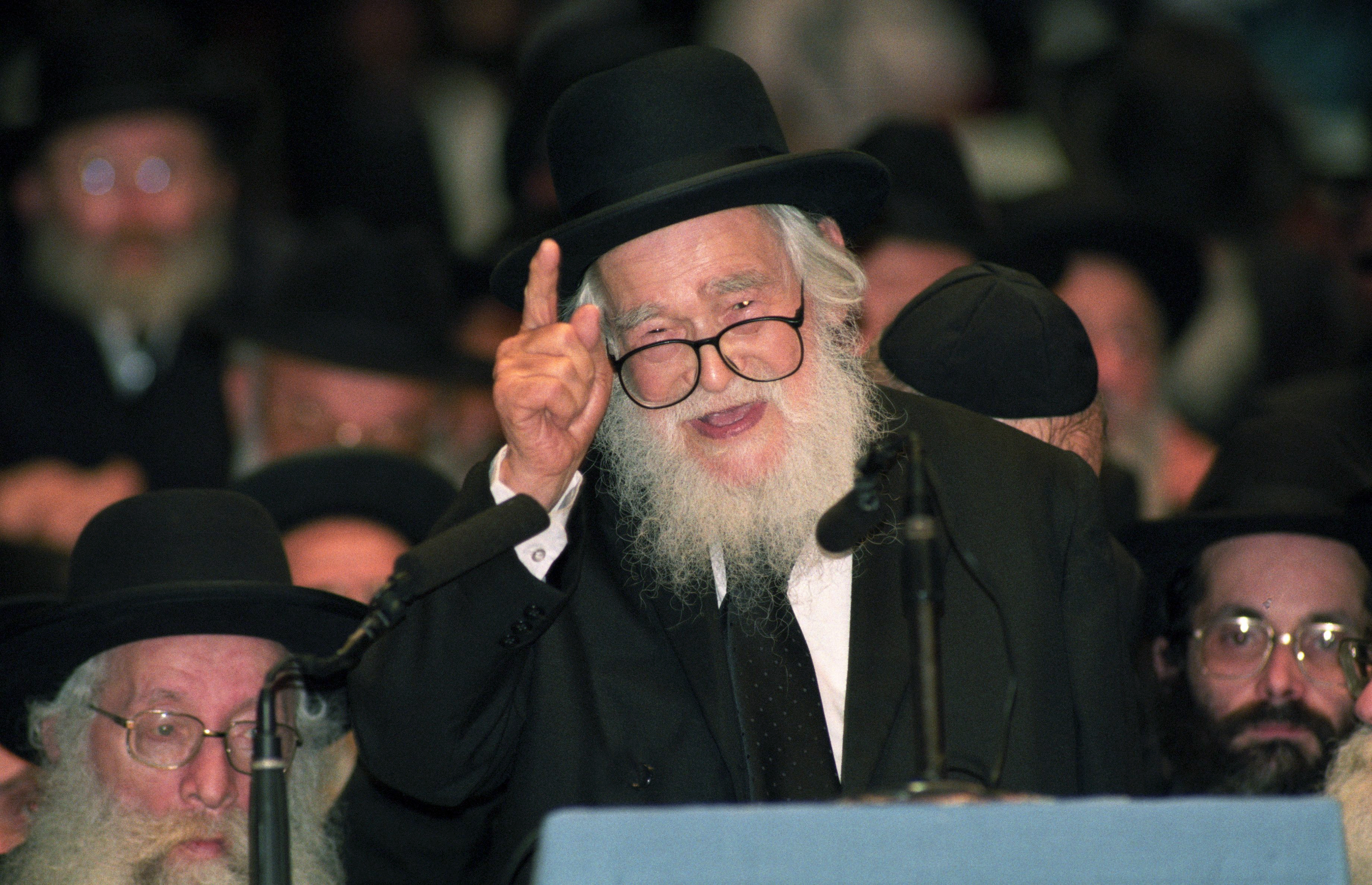

Personal life
- Born: Elazar Menachem Man Shach; January 1, 1899 Vabalninkas, Lithuania
- Died: November 2, 2001 (aged 102) Tel Aviv, Israel
- Buried: Bnei Brak, Israel
- Spouse: Guttel Gilmovsky
- Children: Miriam Raisel, Devorah, Ephraim
- Parent(s): Ezriel and Batsheva Shach
- Education: Slabodka Yeshiva

Religious life
- Religion: Judaism

Jewish leader
- Yeshiva: Ponevezh Yeshiva
- Semikhah: Isser Zalman Meltzer

Elazar Menachem Man Shach (Hebrew: אלעזר מנחם מן שך, Elazar Shach; January 1, 1899 O.S. – November 2, 2001) was a Haredi rabbi who headed Lithuanian Orthodox Jews in Israel and around the world from the early 1970s until his death in 2001. He served as chair of the Council of Sages and one of three co-deans of the Ponevezh Yeshiva in Bnei Brak, along with Shmuel Rozovsky and Dovid Povarsky. Due to his differences with the Hasidic leadership of the Agudat Yisrael political party, he allied with Ovadia Yosef, with whom he founded the Shas party in 1984. Later, in 1988, Shach criticized Ovadia Yosef, saying that, "Sepharadim are not suitable for leadership positions", and subsequently founded the Degel HaTorah political party representing the Litvaks in the Israeli Knesset.

== Biography ==
Elazar Menachem Man Shach was born in Vabalninkas (Vaboilnik in Yiddish), in northern Lithuania, to Ezriel and Batsheva Shach (née Levitan). The Shach family had been merchants for generations, while the Levitans were religious scholars who served various Lithuanian communities. As a child, Shach was considered an illui (child prodigy) and in 1909, aged 11, went to Panevėžys to study at the Ponevezh Yeshiva which was then headed by Isaac Jacob Rabinowitz. In 1913 he enrolled at Yeshivas Knesses Yisrael in Slabodka.

When World War I began in 1914, Shach returned to his family, but then began traveling across Lithuania from town to town, sleeping and eating wherever he could, while continuing to study Torah. During this period he suffered considerable deprivation, living with inadequate sanitation and being compelled to wear tattered clothing and worn out shoes. He reportedly sequestered himself in an attic for two years not knowing where his parents were. In 1915, following the advice of Yechezkel Bernstein (author of Divrei Yechezkel), Shach traveled to Slutsk to study at the yeshiva there.

In 1939, Shach went to Vilna, where he stayed with Chaim Ozer Grodzinski. Later that year, Shach's mother and eldest daughter died. In early 1940, Shach's maternal uncle, Aron Levitan, helped him get emigration visas to the United States, but after consulting with Yitzchok Zev Soloveitchik and Grodzinski, Schach decided to immigrate to Mandatory Palestine. Shach later served as a rosh yeshiva in Jerusalem.

== Pedagogic and rabbinic career ==
At Lomzha Yeshivah in Petach Tikvah, Shach served as the main Talmudic lecturer, while Rabbi Moshe Shmuel and Rabbi Shmuel Rozovsky delivered specialized lectures in Talmud.

Several years after the re-establishment of the Ponevezh yeshiva in Bnei Brak, Shach was invited by Yosef Shlomo Kahaneman to become one of its deans, and, after discussing the proposal with Soloveitchik, he accepted the offer. Shach served in that capacity from 1954 until his death.

Shach received semikhah (rabbinical ordination) from Isser Zalman Meltzer, and served as chairman of Chinuch Atzmai and Va'ad HaYeshivos. In the mid-1960s, Samuel Belkin offered Shach the position of senior rosh yeshivah at Yeshiva University in New York, which he declined. Shach's wife died in 1969 from complications connected to diabetes. From 1970 until his death, Shach was generally recognized by Lithuanian Haredim and other Haredi circles as the Gadol Ha-Dor (great one of the generation). During his lifetime, Shach was a spiritual mentor to more than 100,000 Orthodox Jews.

== Political career ==
Shach fought those who deviated from what he believed was the classical Haredi path. At the behest of Aharon Kotler, Shach joined the Moetzes Gedolei HaTorah. When Zalman Sorotzkin died in 1966, Shach became president of the Moetzes Gedolei HaTorah, before later resigning from the Moetzes after the other leading rabbis refused to follow him. Shach wrote strongly in support of every observant citizen voting. He felt that a vote not cast for the right party or candidate was effectively a vote for the wrong party and candidate. This theme is consistent in his writings from the time that the State of Israel was established.

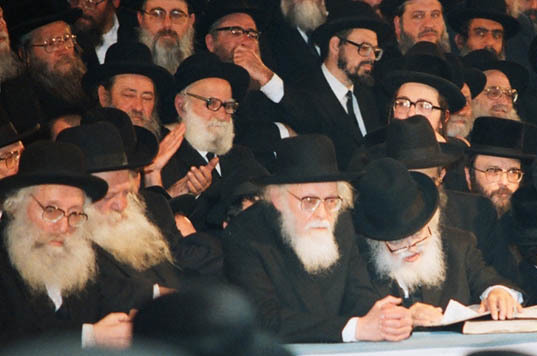
Shach (late 1980s), seated right, looking down at book. Yosef Shalom Eliashiv and Chaim Kanievsky are to his left.

Shas ran for the 11th Knesset in 1984, and Shach called upon his "Lithuanian" followers to vote for it in the polls, a move that many saw as key political and religious move in Shach's split with the Hasidic-controlled Agudat Yisrael. While initially, Shas was largely under the aegis of Shach, Ovadia Yosef gradually exerted control over the party, culminating in Shas' decision to support the Labor party in the 13th Knesset in 1992.

On the eve of the November 1988 election, Shach officially broke away from Agudat Israel. His primary complaint was the joining up with PAI, after this partnership has been rejected in previous election campaigns. Other complaints included Hamodia publishing a series of articles based on the teachings of Rabbi Menachem Mendel Schneersohn (the Lubavitcher Rebbe). Shach criticized The Rebbe for his presumed messianic aspirations. Shach wanted the Aguda party to oppose Lubavitch; however, all but one (Belz, which also eventually dropped out) of the Hasidic groups within the party refused to back him. Shach and his followers then formed the Degel HaTorah ("Flag of the Torah") party to represent the non-Hasidic Ashkenazi Haredim.

Following a visit by Shach in Jerusalem to the leading rabbis and halachic decisors of the day, Yosef Shalom Eliashiv and Shlomo Zalman Auerbach, in order to seek their support for the new party. Rabbi Auerbach refused to lend his support.

In a speech delivered prior to the 1992 elections, Shach said that Sephardim were not fit for leadership and aroused great anger among Sephardi voters. Following the elections, Shach instructed Shas not to join the government, while Ovadia Yosef instructed them to join; this precipitated an open rift between the parties. Shach then claimed that Shas had "removed itself from the Jewish community when it joined the wicked...".

Around 1995, Shach retired from political activity.

== Views and opinions ==
Shach was opposed to Zionism, both secular and religious. He was dismissive of secular Israelis and their culture. For example, during a 1990 speech, he lambasted secular kibbutzniks as "breeders of rabbits and pigs" who did not "know what Yom Kippur is". In the same speech, he said that the Labor Party had cut themselves off from their Jewish past and wished to "seek a new Torah". Labor Party politician Yossi Beilin said Shach's speech set back relations between religious and secular Israelis by decades. Other secular Israelis, including residents of the kibbutz Ein Harod, were said to have found the speech inspirational, so much so as to bring them closer to religious practice.

Shach taught that the Holocaust was a divine punishment on European Jews in response to their abandoning of religious observance for the Enlightenment and Zionism. He said "The Holy One Blessed Be He kept score for hundreds of years until it added up to six million Jews." This caused outrage in the secular Israeli media and a robust response from the Lubavitcher Rebbe. In his defence, Haredi MKs said his comments had been misconstrued and were not meant to justify Nazi atrocities. Wishing to prevent deviation from the established order of prayers, he opposed the composition of new prayers to commemorate the victims of the Holocaust. Shach believed that the secularism of Israel society could cause another Holocaust and he once said that if the Education Ministry were to be placed in the hands of Meretz MK Shulamit Aloni, it would result in "over a million Israeli children being forced into apostasy, and that would be worse than what had happened to Jewish children during the Holocaust."

In 1985, four years after the Labor Party supported a liberalized abortion law, Shach refused to meet with Shimon Peres and said he would not speak with a "murderer of fetuses".

In Haaretz, Shahar Ilan described him as "an ideologue" and "a zealot who repeatedly led his followers into ideological battles".

Shach never seemed concerned over the discord he provoked: "There is no need to worry about machlokes [dispute], because if it is done for the sake of Heaven, in the end, it will endure... One is obligated to be a baal-machlokes [disputant]. It is no feat to be in agreement with everybody!"

Shach was also critical of Western democracy, once referring to it as a "cancer", adding that, "Only the sacred Torah is the true democracy."

=== Position on army service ===
In May 1998, following talk of a political compromise which would allow Haredim to perform national service by guarding holy places, Shach as well as many other Orthodox leaders told their followers in public statements that it is forbidden to serve in the army, and that "it is necessary to die for this". This is a case, Shach said, in which, halachically, one must "be killed, rather than transgress". This position was expressed in large ads placed in all three of Israel's daily newspapers on May 22, 1998. Shach is quoted as saying that, "Any yeshiva student who cheats the authorities and uses the exemption from service for anything other than real engagement in Torah study is a rodef (someone who threatens the lives of others)", and that "those who are not learning jeopardize the position of those who are learning as they should".

=== Position on territorial compromise ===
Shach supported the withdrawal from land under Israeli control, basing it upon the halakhic principle of pikuach nefesh ("[the] saving [of a] life"), in which the preservation of lives takes precedence over nearly all other obligations in the Torah, including those pertaining to the sanctity of land. Shach also criticized Israeli settlements in the West Bank and Gaza Strip as "a blatant attempt to provoke the international community", and called on Haredi Jews to avoid moving to such communities. Shach often said that for true peace, it was "permitted and necessary to compromise on even half of the Land of Israel", and wrote that, "It is forbidden for the Israeli government to be stubborn about these things, as this will add fuel to the fire of anti-Semitism". When Yitzchak Hutner was asked to support this position, he refused, saying that, "agreement to other-than-biblical borders was tantamount to denial of the entire Torah".

=== Chabad and the Lubavitcher Rebbe ===
Shach was an antagonist of Rabbi Menachem Mendel Schneersohn, and was one of the leading major Lithuanian rabbis to come out in force against the Chabad movement and its leader. From the 1970s onwards, Shach was publicly critical of Schneerson, accusing Chabad of false Messianism by claiming Schneerson had created a cult of crypto-messianism around himself. He objected to Schneerson's calling upon the Messiah to appear, and when some of Schneerson's followers proclaimed him the Messiah, Shach called for a boycott of Chabad and its institutions. In 1988, Shach denounced Schneerson as a meshiach sheker (false messiah), and compared Chabad Hasidim to the followers of the 17th century Sabbatai Zevi, branding as idolatrous Schneerson's statement referring to his father-in-law, the previous rebbe of Chabad, which he viewed as God's chosen leader of the generation, "the essence and being of God clothed in a body of the "Moses" of the Generation, as it was by Moses himself". Followers of Shach refused to eat meat slaughtered by Chabad Hasidim, refusing to recognize them as adherents of authentic Judaism. Shach also opposed Chabad's Rambam Campaign and Tefillin Campaign, and once described Schneerson as "the madman who sits in New York and drives the whole world crazy". He nevertheless prayed for his recovery, explaining that "I pray for the rebbe's recovery, and simultaneously also pray that he abandon his invalid way".

=== Criticism of rabbis and Jewish institutions ===
In a lengthy attack on Joseph B. Soloveitchik (d. 1993) of Yeshiva University, Shach accused him of writing "things that are forbidden to hear", as well as of "... endangering the survival of Torah-true Judaism by indoctrinating the masses with actual words of heresy".

Shach resigned from the Moetzes Gedolei HaTorah ("Council of Torah Greats") following tensions between him and the Gerer Rebbe, Simcha Bunim Alter. In the Eleventh Knesset elections of 1984, Shach had already told his supporters to vote for Shas, instead of Agudat Yisrael. Some attempted to create the perception that the schism was a re-emergence of the dissent between Hasidim and Mitnagdim, as Shach represented the Lithuanian Torah world, while the Gerer Rebbe was among the most important Hasidic Rebbes and represented the most significant Hasidic court in Agudat Yisrael. However, it would not be accurate to base the entire conflict on a renewal of the historic dispute between Hasidim and Mitnagdim which began in the latter half of the eighteenth century. Shach strenuously opposed this mischaracterization.

Rabbi Adin Steinsaltz was accused of heresy by Shach, who, in a letter written September 10, 1988, wrote that "... and similarly, all his other works contain heresy. It is forbidden to debate with Steinsaltz, because, as a heretic, all the debates will only cause him to degenerate more. He is not a genuine person (ein tocho ke-baro), and everyone is obliged to distance themselves from him. This is the duty of the hour (mitzvah be-sha'atah). It will generate merit for the forthcoming Day of Judgement." In summer 1989, a group of rabbis, including Shach, placed a ban on three of Steinsaltz's books.

Shach wrote that Yeshiva University-type institutions posed a threat to the endurance of authentic Judaism. He called them "an absolute disaster, causing the destruction of our Holy Torah. Even the so-called 'Touro College' in the USA is a terrible disaster, a ' churban ha-das ' (destruction of the Jewish religion)..." Shach writes that the success of those people who were able to achieve greatness in Torah, despite their involvement in secular studies, are "ma'aseh satan" (the work of the satanic forces), for the existence of such role models will entice others to follow suit, only to be doomed. In conversation with an American rabbi in the 1980s, Shach stated, "The Americans think that I am too controversial and divisive. But in a time when no one else is willing to speak up on behalf of our true tradition, I feel myself impelled to do so."

=== Views on Hasidic Judaism ===
Shach wrote that he was not opposed to Hasidic Judaism, saying he recognized Hasidism as "yera'im" and "shlaymim" (God-fearing and wholesome), and full of Torah and mitzvos and fear of Heaven. Shach denied that he was a hater of Hasidim: "We are fighting against secularism in the yeshivas. Today, with the help of Heaven, people are learning Torah in both Hasidic and Lithuanian yeshivos. In my view, there is no difference between them; all of them are important and dear to me. In fact, go ahead, and ask your Hasidic friends with us at Ponevezh if I distinguish between Hasidic and Lithuanian students."

== Death and legacy ==
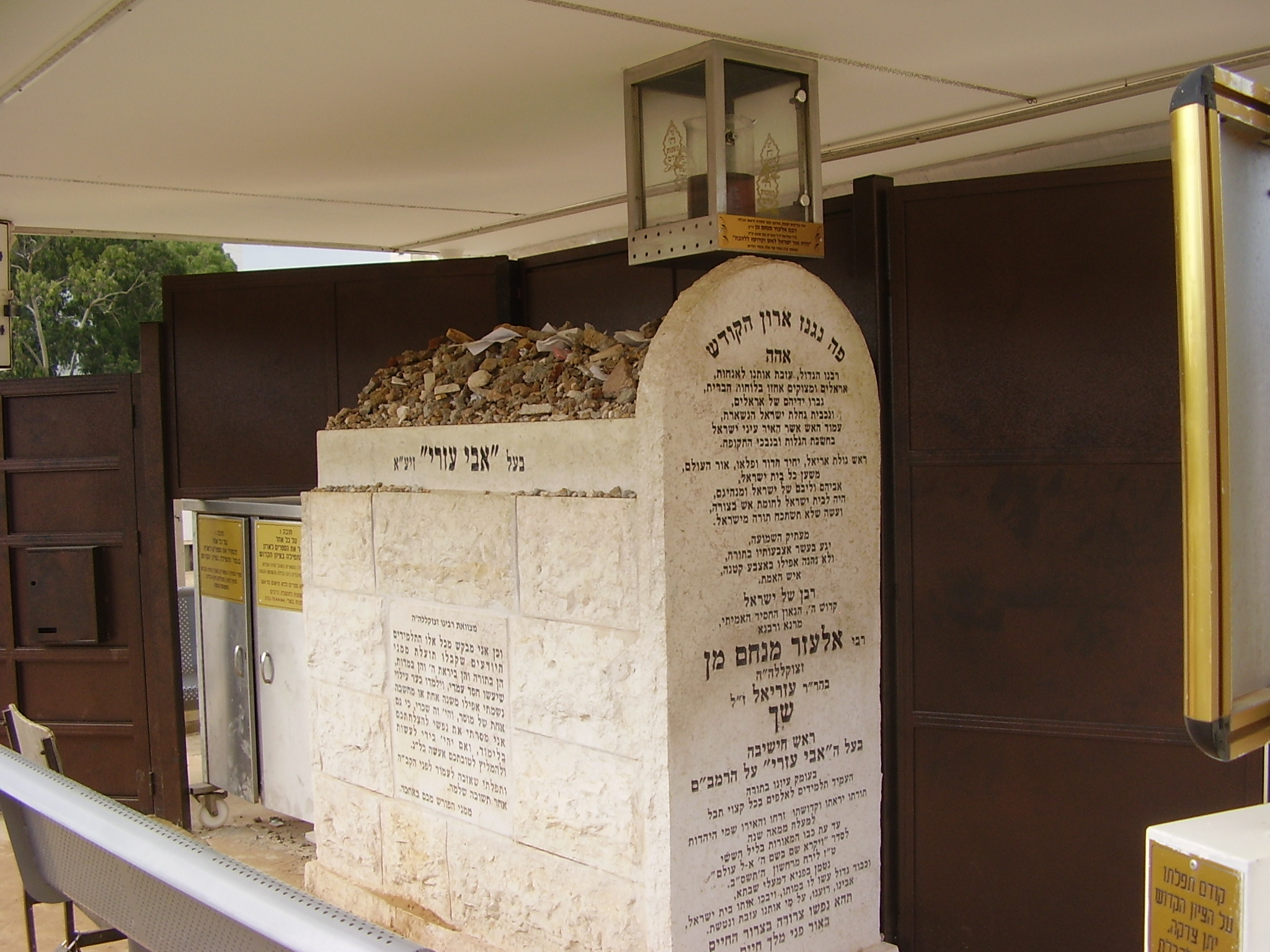
Shach's grave in Bnei Brak

Shach died on November 2, 2001, two months short of his 103rd birthday (although other reports put his age at 108). His funeral in Bnei Brak was attended by up to 400,000 people. PM Ariel Sharon said: "There is no doubt that we have lost an important person who made his mark over many years." Chief Rabbi Yisrael Meir Lau said Shach's most important contribution were his efforts in restoring Jewish scholarship after the Holocaust. Haaretz described him as "an ideologue", and "a zealot who repeatedly led his followers into ideological battles". David Landau wrote that his "uniqueness lay in the authority he wielded", and that "perhaps not since the Gaon Elijah of Vilna, who lived in the latter part of the 18th century, has there been a rabbinical figure of such unchallenged power over the Orthodox world". Avi Shafran of Agudath Israel of America said: "His pronouncements and his talks when he was active would regularly capture the rapt attention of the entire Orthodox world." A dispute subsequently arose as to whether Yosef Shalom Eliashiv or Aharon Yehuda Leib Shteinman should succeed him. The towns of Bnei Brak and Beitar Illit have streets named after him.

Shach was survived by his daughter Devorah, who had nine children with Meir Tzvi Bergman, and his son Ephraim, who rejected the Haredi lifestyle and joined the Religious Zionist movement. Ephraim Shach served in the Israel Defense Forces, received a doctorate in history and philosophy from the Bernard Revel Graduate School of Yeshiva University, and worked as a supervisor for the Israel Ministry of Education. He married Tamara Yarlicht-Kowalsky, and they had two children. He died on October 17, 2011, at the age of 81.

== Published works ==
- Avi Ezri – Insights and expositions on various concepts in the Yad HaChazaka of the Rambam
- Michtavim u'Maamarim – a collection of Shach's letters published in various editions of 4–6 volumes.
- Machsheves HaMussar - R' Shach's mussar discourses on the parsha.
