= Shumyachsky District =

Shumyachsky District Шумячский район (Russian)
- District
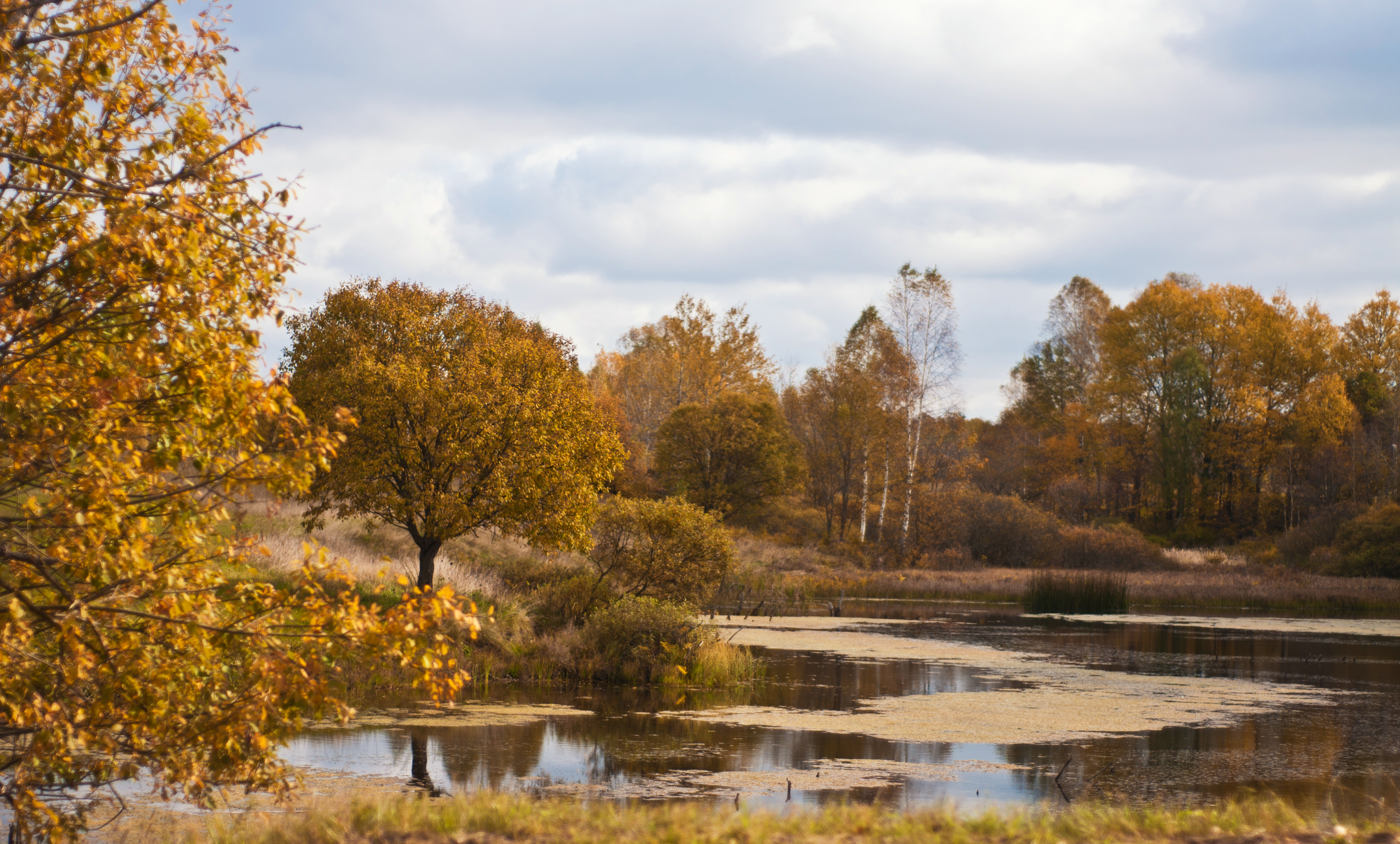
- Lime trees near Pervomayskaya, Shumyachsky District

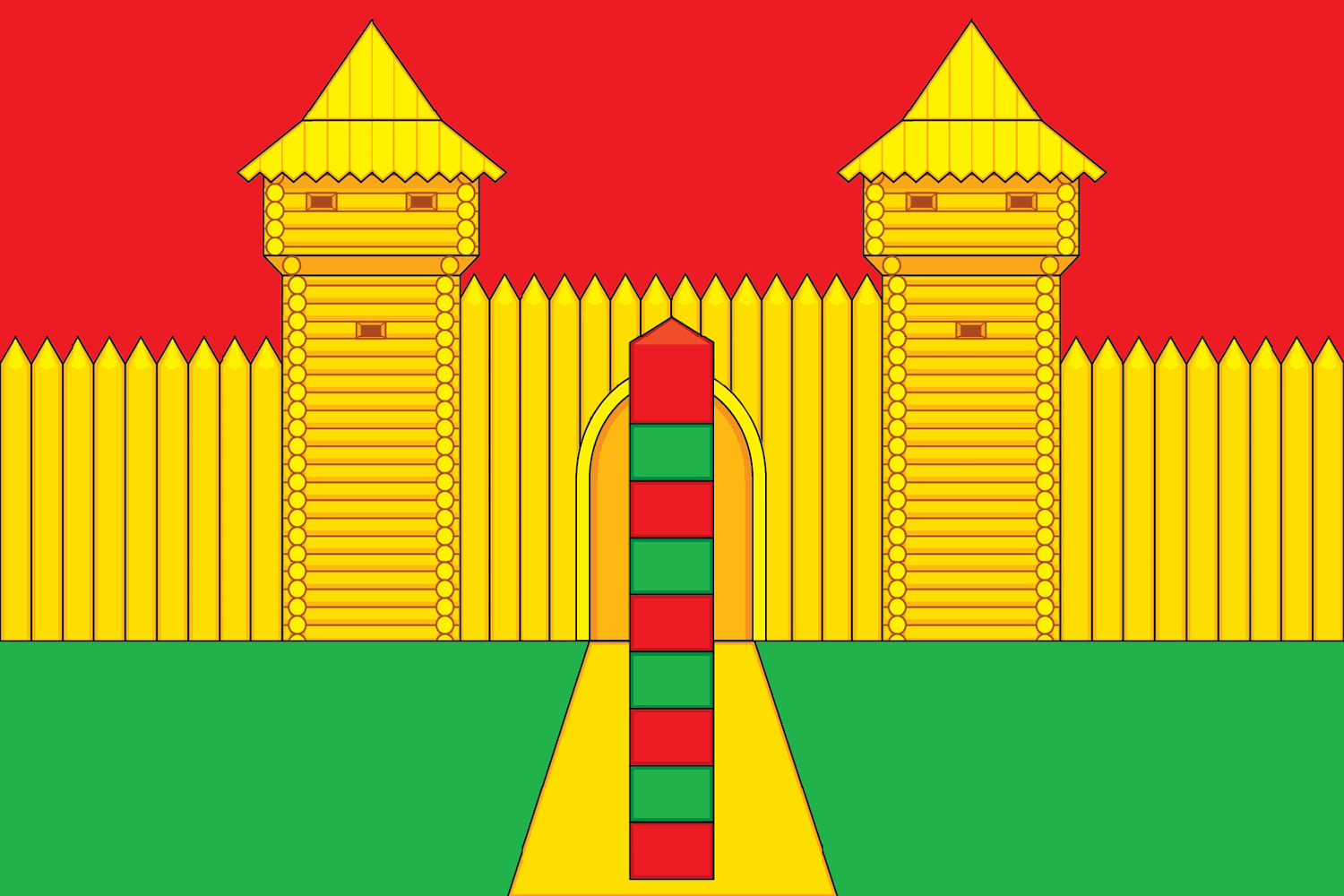
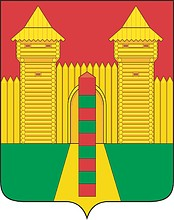
- Flag Coat of arms
- Location of Shumyachsky District in Smolensk Oblast
- Coordinates: 53°51′N 32°25′E
- Country: Russia
- Federal subject: Smolensk Oblast
- Established: 1929
- Administrative center: Shumyachi

Area
  - Total: 1,367.70 km^{2} (528.07 sq mi)

Population (2010 Census)
  - Total: 10,713
  - Density: 7.8329/km^{2} (20.287/sq mi)
  - Urban: 39.5%
  - Rural: 60.5%

Administrative structure
  - Administrative divisions: 1 Urban settlements, 7 Rural settlements
  - Inhabited localities: 1 urban-type settlements, 139 rural localities

Municipal structure
  - Municipally incorporated as: Shumyachsky Municipal District
  - Municipal divisions: 1 urban settlements, 7 rural settlements
- Time zone: UTC+3 (MSK)
- OKTMO ID: 66656000
- Website: http://shumichi.admin-smolensk.ru/

Shumyachsky District (Russian: Шумячский райо́н) is an administrative and municipal district (raion), one of the twenty-five in Smolensk Oblast, Russia. It is located in the southwest of the oblast and borders with Khislavichsky District in the north, Pochinkovsky District in the northwest, Roslavlsky District in the east, Yershichsky District in the southeast, Klimavichy District of Mogilev Region of Belarus in the south, and with Krychaw and Mstsislaw Districts, also of Mogilev Region, in the west. The area of the district is 1,367.70 square kilometers (528.07 sq mi). Its administrative center is the urban locality (a settlement) of Shumyachi. Population: 10,713 (2010 Census); 14,032 (2002 census); 17,678 (1989 Soviet census). The population of Shumyachi accounts for 39.5% of the district's total population.

== Geography ==
The whole district belongs to the drainage basin of the Sozh River, a major left tributary of the Dnieper. The Sozh itself makes the northwestern border of the district, separating it from Mogilev Region of Belarus. The biggest tributary of the Sozh traversing the district is the Ostyor River, which makes the southwestern border of the district, separating it from Mogilev Region as well.

== History ==
Historically, the area belonged intermittently to the Principality of Smolensk and the Grand Duchy of Lithuania, subsequently to Poland. Shumyachi is first mentioned in 1587. The western part of the district was in 1772, as a result of the First Partition of Poland, transferred to Russia and included in the newly established Mogilev Governorate. It belonged to Klimovichsky Uyezd. In 1810, one of the first Arakcheev military settlements (Shtab-Zagustino) was established here. In 1919, Mogilev Governorate was abolished, and the area was transferred to Gomel Governorate. The eastern part, in the course of the administrative reform carried out in 1708 by Peter the Great, was included into Smolensk Governorate and remained there until 1929, with the exception of the brief periods between 1713 and 1726, when it belonged to Riga Governorate, and between 1775 and 1796, when Smolensk Governorate was transformed into Smolensk Viceroyalty. It belonged to Roslavlsky Uyezd. In 1922, the western part of the district was included to Roslavlsky Uyezd as well.

On 12 July 1929, governorates and uyezds were abolished, and Shumyachsky District with the administrative center in the settlement of Shumyachi was established. The district belonged to Roslavl Okrug of Western Oblast. On August 1, 1930 the okrugs were abolished, and the districts were subordinated directly to the oblast. On 27 September 1937 Western Oblast was abolished and split between Oryol and Smolensk Oblasts. Shumyachsky District was transferred to Smolensk Oblast. Between August 1941 and 1943, during WWII, the district was occupied by German troops. In 1965, Shumyachi was granted the urban-type settlement status.

In 1972, during the abortive Khrushchyov administrative reform, Yershichsky District was merged into Shumyachsky District. In 1965, it was re-established.

== Economy ==
=== Industry ===
The enterprises in the district produce peat, glass, as well as there are several enterprises of food industry.

=== Agriculture ===
The main agricultural specializations are cattle breeding with meat and milk production as well as growing of crops and potatoes.

=== Transportation ===
The A130 highway (the "Warsaw Highway") which connects Moscow with Babruysk via Obninsk, Roslavl, and Krychaw, crosses the southern part of the district. Shumyachi has a connection to A130. There are also local roads with bus traffic originating from Shumyachi.

The railway connecting Roslavl and Krychaw crosses the southern part of the district. The only station inside the district is Ponyatovka railway station, about 10 kilometres (6.2 mi) south of Shumyachi. In Roslavl, the railway has access to Smolensk and Bryansk; there is not through traffic to Belarus. There is no passenger traffic.

== Culture and recreation ==
In Shumyachi, there is a local museum.
