= Shmuel Rozovsky =

Israeli rabbi

Rabbi Shmuel Rozovsky שמואל רוזובסקי
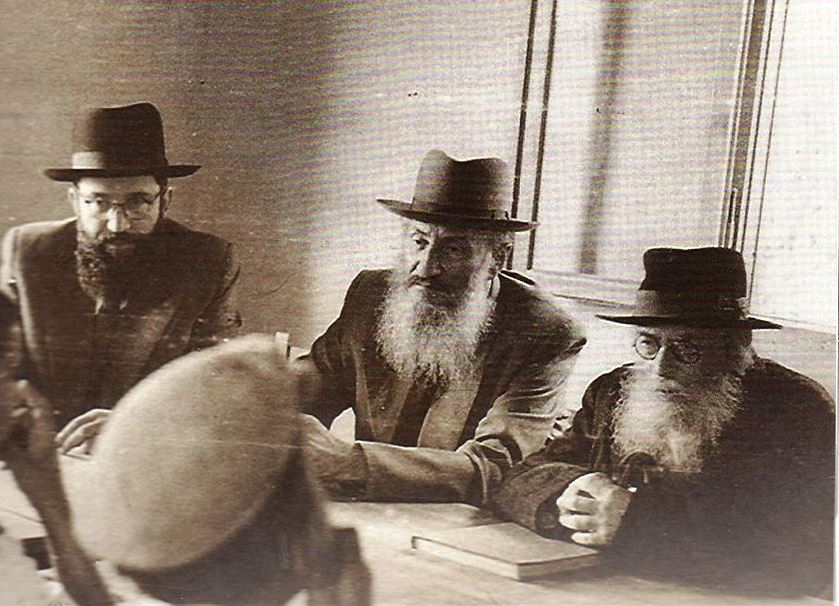
- Rozovsky and Avrohom Karelitz
- Title: Rosh Yeshiva of Ponevezh Yeshiva

Personal life
- Born: 1913 Grodno, Russian Empire
- Died: 1979 (aged 65–66)
- Education: Lomzha Yeshivah, Petach Tikvah

Religious life
- Religion: Judaism

Jewish leader
- Position: Rosh yeshiva
- Yeshiva: Ponovezh Yeshiva
- Began: 1944
- Ended: 1979

Shmuel Rozovsky (Hebrew: שמואל רוזובסקי; 1913–1979) was Rosh Yeshiva of the Ponevezh Yeshiva in Bnei Brak, Israel.

== Biography ==
=== Early life ===
Rozovsky was born in Grodno, where his father Michel Dovid Rozovsky was the chief rabbi. His mother Sara Pearl was the daughter of Avraham Gelburd, the previous rabbi of Grodno.

He studied at the local Sha’ar Hatorah Yeshiva and was student of Shimon Shkop. He also studied with Yisroel Zev Gustman.

In 1935, after the death of his father, to escape being drafted into the Polish army, Rozovsky fled to British-ruled Palestine, where he studied in the Lomzha Yeshivah in Petach Tikvah, married the daughter of Tzvi Pesach Frank (Chief Rabbi of Jerusalem) and taught in the Lomzha Yeshiva.

=== Ponevezh Yeshiva ===
In 1944, he became Rosh Yeshiva of the newly opened Ponovezh Yeshivah in Bnei Barak. Rozovsky placed a strong emphasis on Talmudic skills, and also stressed personal perfection and Mussar, as well as the need to study other facets of Torah including Chumash with the commentaries of Rashi and Nachmanides.

His students included:

- Gershon Edelstein of Ponevezh yeshiva (Bnei Brak)
- Asher Arieli of Yeshivas Mir
- Aharon Pfeuffer, Rosh Yeshiva in London and Johannesburg, and authority on kashrut
- Binyomin Moskowitz of Midrash Shmuel (Jerusalem) (Yeshiva named after R' Shmuel Rozovsky)

== Works ==
- Chiddushei Rabbi Shmuel
- Shiurei Rabbi Shmuel
- Zichron Shmuel
