= Baruch Dov Povarsky =

Biographical sketch of a leading Lithuanian-Chareidi rabbi in Israel

Rabbi Baruch Dov Povarsky ברוך דוב פאווארסקי
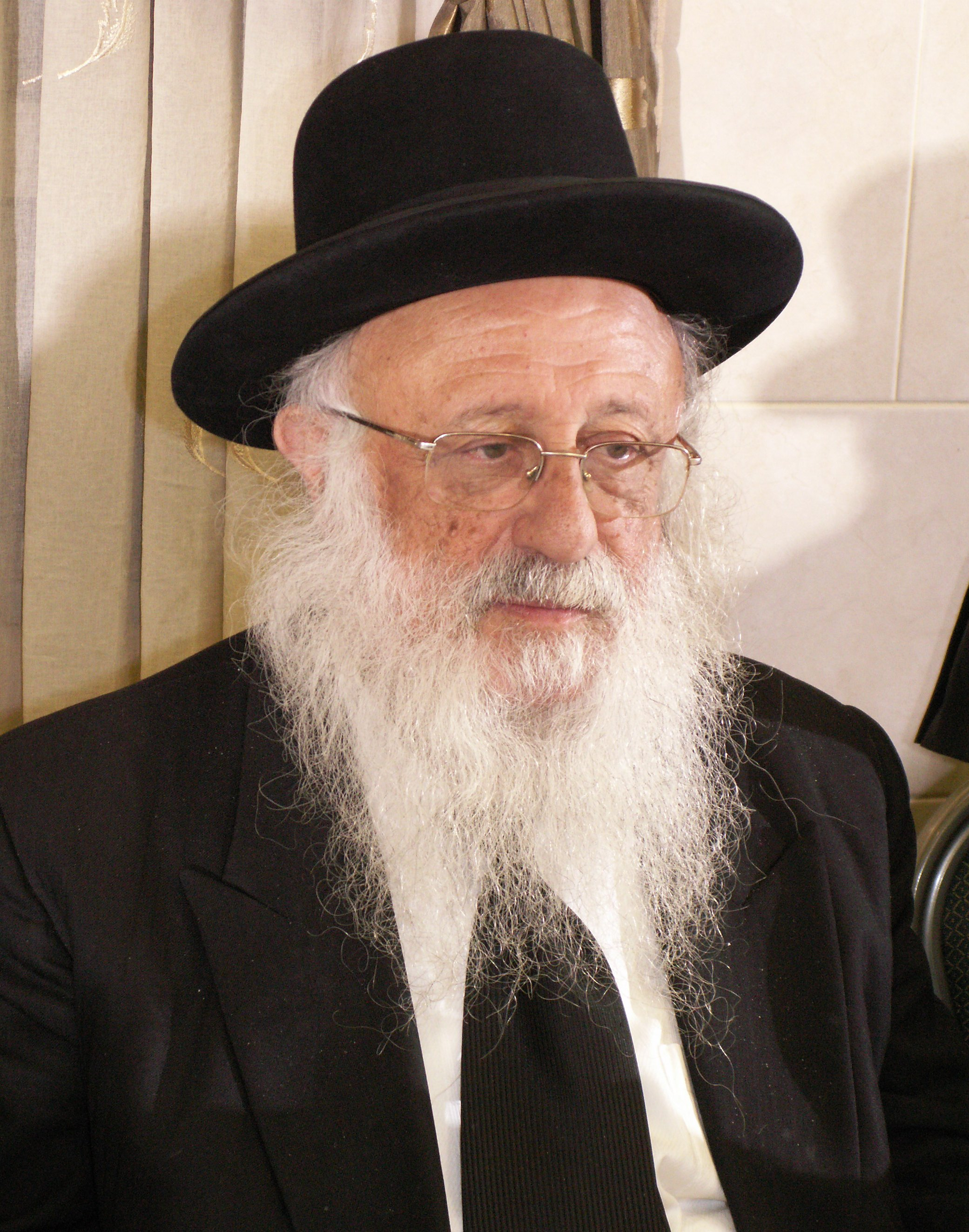

Personal life
- Born: 17 August 1931 (age 94) Kletzk, Second Polish Republic present-day Belarus
- Parent: Rabbi Dovid Povarsky (father)
- Education: Ponevezh Yeshiva

Religious life
- Religion: Judaism
- Denomination: Haredi Judaism

Jewish leader
- Predecessor: Rabbi Elazar Shach
- Yeshiva: Ponevezh Yeshiva
- Position: Rosh yeshiva
- Organisation: Moetzes Gedolei HaTorah

Rabbi Baruch Dov Povarsky (Hebrew: ברוך דוב פוברסקי, born 17 August 1931), often referred to as Rabbi Berel Povarsky (Yiddish: בערל פאווארסקי), is a rosh yeshiva in the Ponevezh Yeshiva in Bnei Brak, Israel. He served alongside Rabbi Gershon Edelstein in this role until the latter's death on 30 May 2023.

== Biography ==
Rabbi Povarsky was born in 1931 in Kletsk. When he was three months old, the family moved to Baranovich where R' Dovid became a teacher in Yeshiva Ohel Torah-Baranovich and joined its affiliated kollel. During this period, Baruch Dov learned in the city's local cheder. In 1941, escaping the Nazi-Soviet threats in Baranovich (then part of Poland), the Povarskys escaped to Vilnius, Lithuania together with thousands of other refugees. From there, they emigrated to Israel, where R' Dovid was soon appointed rosh yeshiva of the Ponevezh Yeshiva in Bnei Brak. In Israel, he learned in Yeshivas Ohr HaTalmud and Yeshivas Achei Temimim, and in 1943, for a short stint in the Chevron Yeshiva. However, shortly after becoming rosh yeshiva in Ponevezh, R' Dovid brought his son to learn there.

Rabbi Baruch Dov Povarsky began teaching in the Ponevezh Yeshiva in 1953, and after the death of the rosh yeshiva, Rabbi Elazar Menachem Man Shach, he became rosh yeshiva.

== Works ==
- Bad Kodesh
- Bad Kodesh al HaTorah
- Shiurei HaGRaBaD Povarsky
