= Ponevezh Yeshiva =

Yeshiva founded in Ponevez, Lithuania

Coordinates: 32°4′59.49″N 34°49′58.09″E

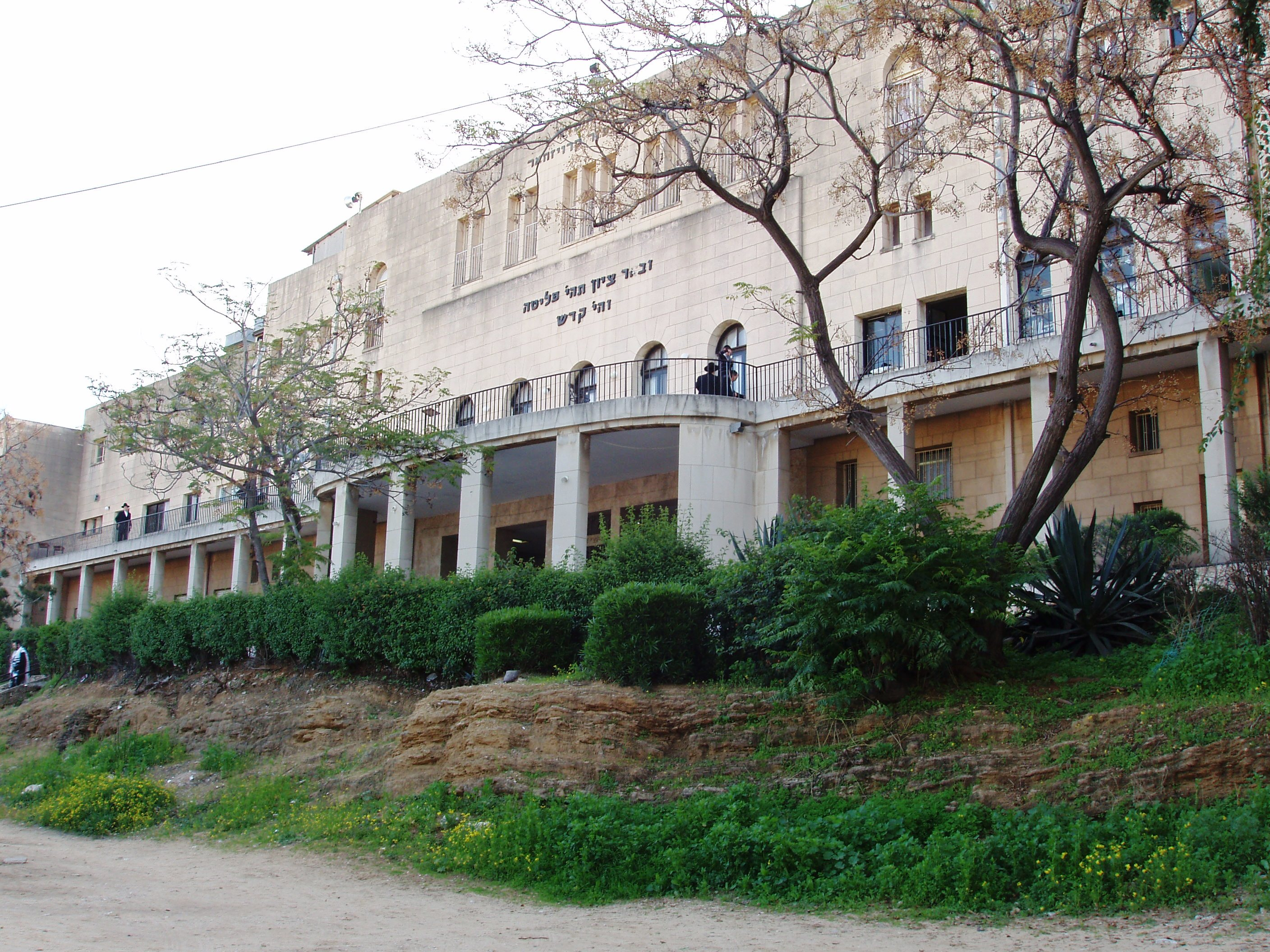
Ponevezh Yeshiva in Bnei Brak, Israel

Ponevez Yeshiva (Lithuanian: Panevėžio ješiva), often pronounced as Ponevitch Yeshiva (Hebrew: ישיבת פוניבז׳), is a yeshiva founded in 1919 in Panevėžys (Ponevezh), Lithuania, and located in Bnei Brak, Israel since 1944. The yeshiva has over three thousand students, including those of affiliated institutions.

It is considered one of the leading Litvish (non-Hasidic strictly orthodox) yeshivas in Israel.

== History ==
Founded in 1919, the yeshiva was originally located in city of Panevėžys (Ponevez), Lithuania before the Holocaust. After the death of its founder, Yitzhak Yaakov Rabinovich, the yeshiva was re-established in Bnei Brak in 1944 by Yosef Shlomo Kahaneman, who appointed Shmuel Rozovsky as dean, and some years later appointed Dovid Povarsky as rosh yeshiva.

The main study hall has an original 16th-century Italian wooden aron kodesh (Torah scroll ark), brought to the yeshiva in the early 1980s, and restored and re-gilded with 22 carat gild leaf.

== Factions ==
During the 1990s, leadership of the yeshiva was the subject of a public disagreement between two of its leaders. Since then, the yeshiva has split and resulted in two yeshivas in the same building, with the students occupying different dormitories, though studying in the same learning hall and eating in the same dining room. The Kahaneman faction of the yeshiva was led by rabbi Gershon Edelstein and is led by rabbis Berel Povarsky (son of Dovid Povarsky), Reb Dovid Levy (son-in-law of Rabbi Edelstein and Reb Chaim Peretz Berman (a grandson of The Steipler, and a son-in-law of Reb Berel Povarsky). The Markovitz faction of the yeshiva is led by Reb Shmuel Markovitz and The Mashgiach Reb Eliyahu Eliezer Dessler, who led together with Reb Asher Deutch until his death in 2024.

== Notable teachers ==
- Yosef Shlomo Kahaneman (1886–1969), founder and rosh yeshiva in Lithuania and Israel
- Eliyahu Eliezer Dessler (1892–1953), mashgiach ruchani, author of the Michtav me-Eliyahu
- Yechezkel Levenstein (1895–1974), mashgiach ruchani, author of Or Yechezkel
- Shmuel Rozovsky (1913–1979), rosh yeshiva
- Dovid Povarsky (1902–1999), rosh yeshiva
- Elazar Menachem Man Shach (1899–2001), rosh yeshiva
- Chaim Friedlander (1923–1986), mashgiach, co-compiler of Michtav me-Eliyahu and author of the well known Sifsei Chaim series (not to be confused with the Liska Rebbe of the same name)
- Gershon Edelstein (1923–2023), rosh yeshiva and spiritual leader of the Degel HaTorah political party in Israel
- Baruch Dov Povarsky (1931–), commonly called R' Berel, rosh yeshiva

== Notable alumni ==
- Pinchas Goldschmidt
- Shraga Feivish Hager, Kosover rebbe
- Mordechai Halperin, Chief Officer of Medical Ethics for the Israeli Ministry of Health, director of the Dr. Falk Schlesinger Institute
- Meir Kessler
- Dov Landau
- Israel Meir Lau, former Ashkenazi Chief Rabbi of Israel
- David Leibel
- Yaakov Peretz, rosh yeshiva of Midrash Sepharadi
- Yoel Schwartz, Torah scholar and author, senior lecturer at Yeshiva Dvar Yerushalayim
- Avrohom Yitzchok Ulman, rabbi of Ner Yisroel in Jerusalem, member of Jerusalem's Edah HaChareidis
- R.J. Zwi Werblowsky (1924-2015), scholar of comparative religion and interfaith dialogue

== Affiliated institutions ==
- Kollel Avreichim — located on the grounds of the yeshiva in the Ohel Kedoshim building; intended for married students who have graduated from the yeshiva
- Yeshivat Ponevezh Le'zeirim — a division for 200 high school students headed by Rabbi Michel Yehuda Lefkowitz, and was formerly co-headed by Rabbi Aharon Yehuda Leib Shteinman
- Batei Avot — sheltered accommodation established by Rabbi Yosef Shlomo Kahaneman for children rescued from the Holocaust and orphans and children from broken homes; donated by Henry Krausher
- Grodno Yeshiva - Be'er Ya'akov — an additional yeshiva located in Be'er Ya'akov
- Grodno Yeshiva - Ashdod, also known as Ponevezh Ashdod — an additional yeshiva located in Ashdod
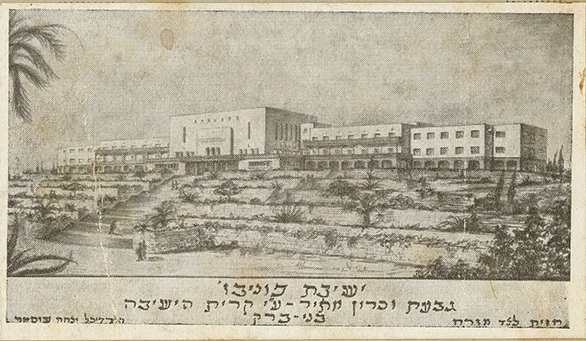
The yeshiva in 1949

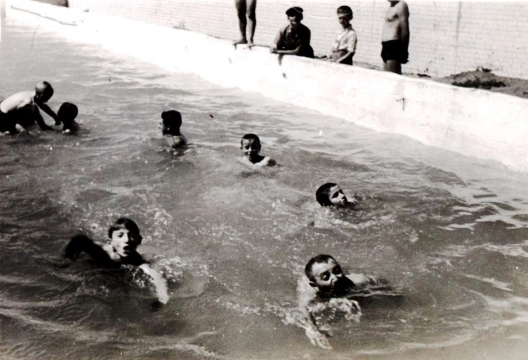
Yeshiva pool, 1945

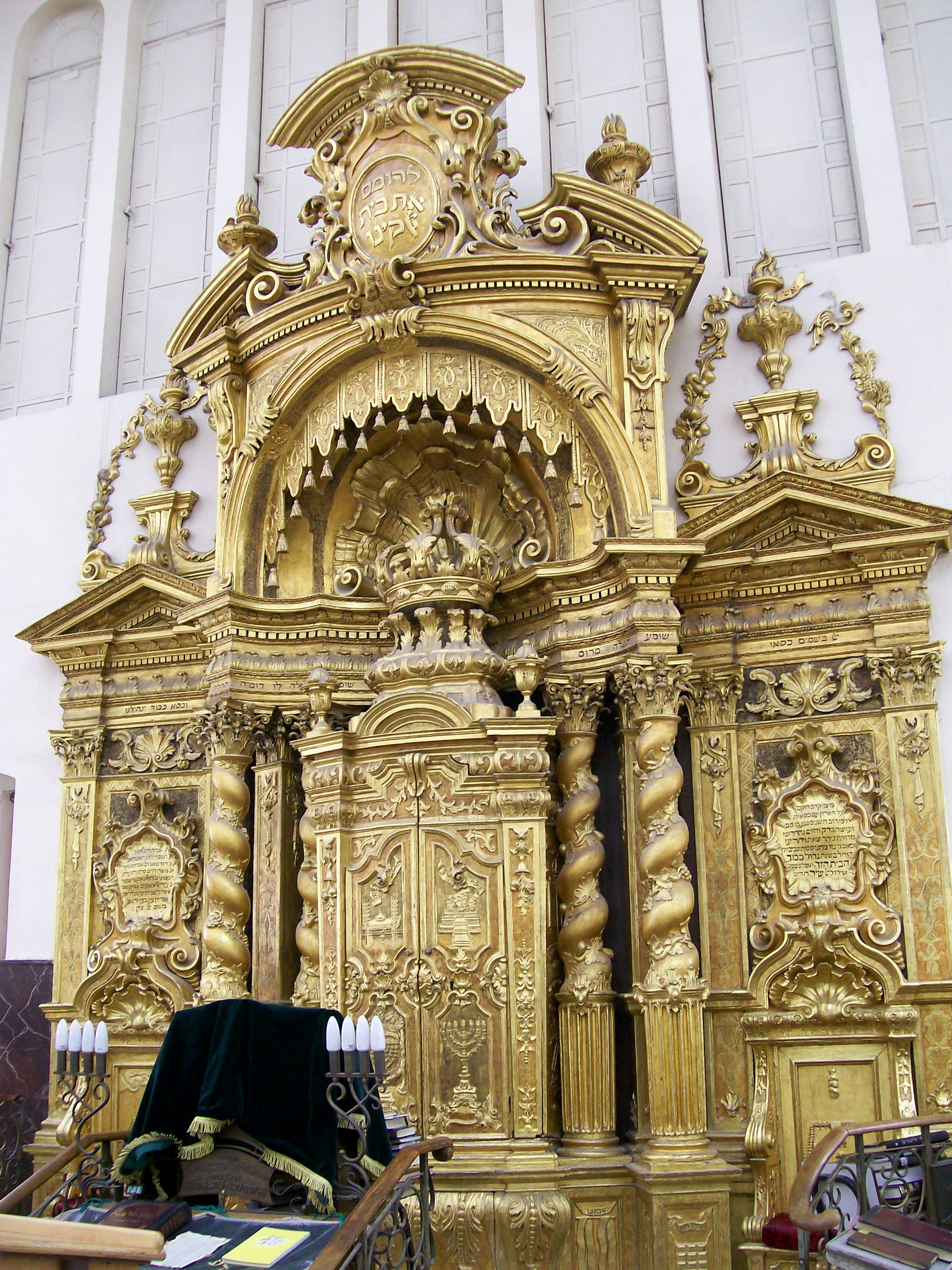
The aron Kodesh (Torah scroll ark)

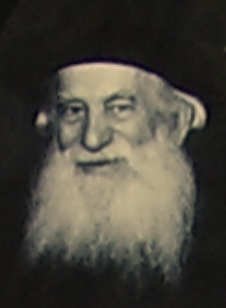
Yosef Shlomo Kahaneman, second rosh yeshiva of Yeshiva Ponevezh

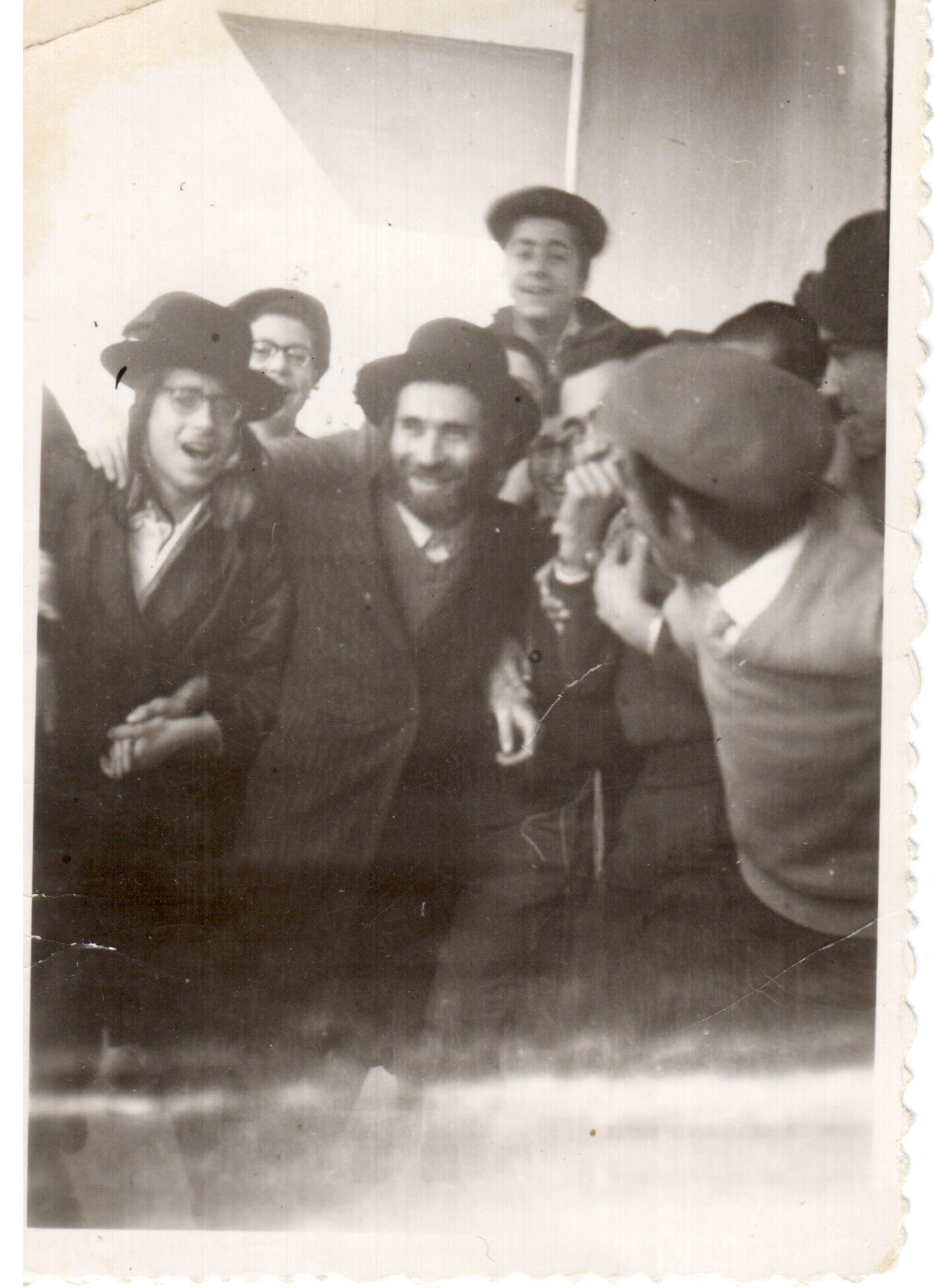
Rabbi Steinman with students of Little Yeshiva Ponevezh on Purim, 1960

Header of official stationery of Yeshiva Ponevezh in Panevėžys, Lithuania, ca. 1920

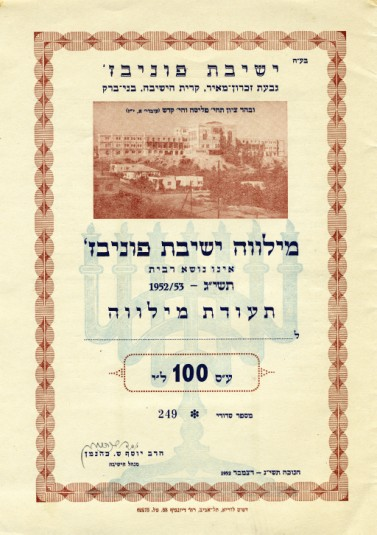
Loan certificated for 100 Israeli shekels issued by Yeshiva Ponevezh, 1953

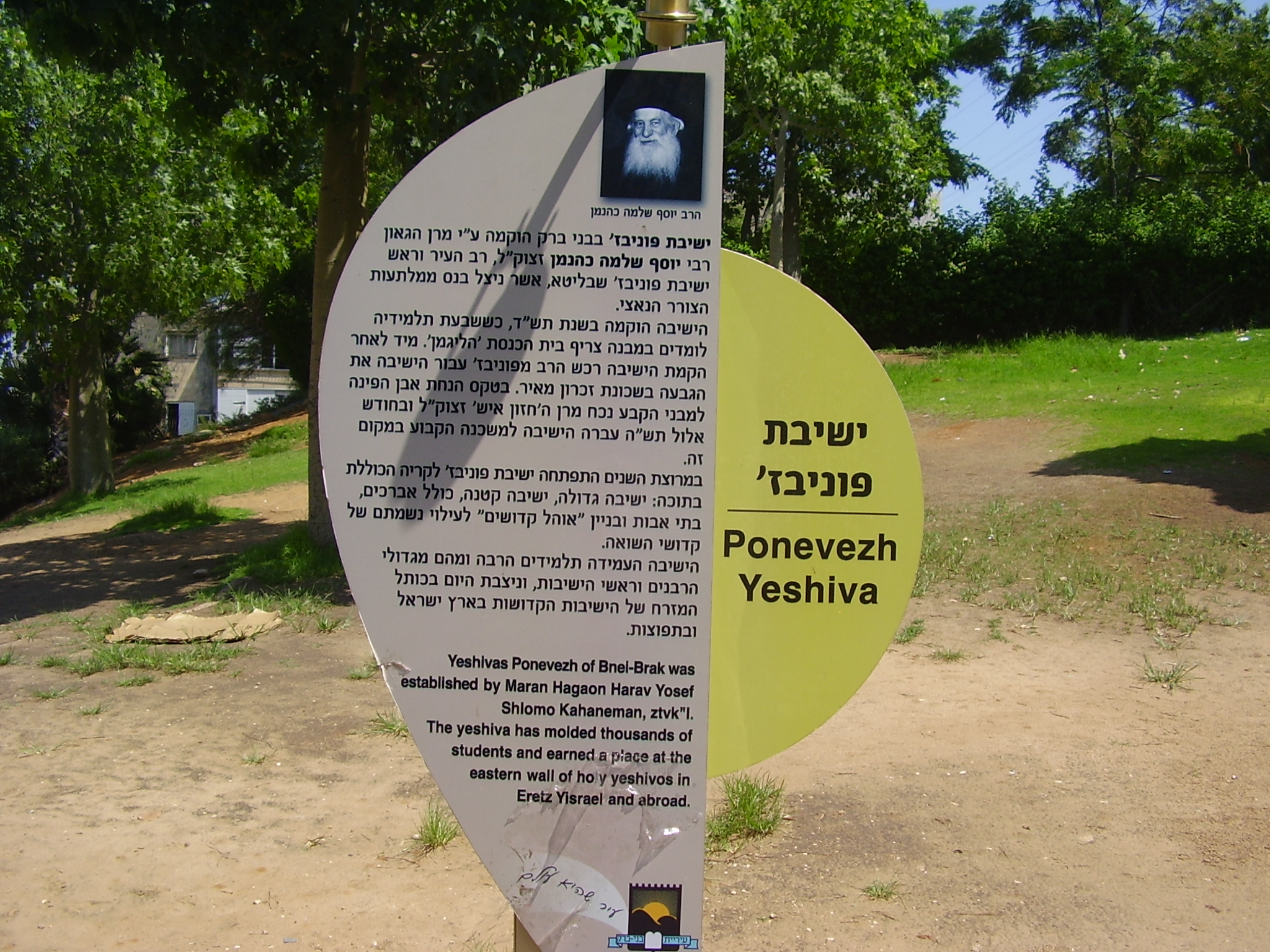
Yeshiva Ponevezh history plaque

Video from the Yeshiva in 1960
