= Dovid Povarsky =

Rosh Yeshiva of Ponevezh Yeshiva

Yehoshua Dovid Povarsky
- יהושע דוד פוברסקי
- Rav Yehoshua Dovid Povarsky

Personal life
- Born: 1902 Lithuania
- Died: 1999 (aged 96–97)
- Spouse: Tzipporah Kreiser
- Children: Baruch Dov Povarsky and others
- Notable work(s): Yeshuas Dovid, Shiurei Reb Dovid Povarsky, Yishmeru Da'as
- Education: Kelm Talmud Torah, Mir Yeshiva, Kovno
- Known for: Ponevezh Yeshiva
- Occupation: Rosh Yeshiva

Religious life
- Religion: Judaism

Yehoshua Dovid Povarsky (Hebrew: יהושע דוד פוברסקי; 1902–1999) was Rosh Yeshiva of Ponevezh Yeshiva.

== Biography ==
Povarsky studied in the Kelm Talmud Torah under Yeruchom Levovitz whom he followed when Levovitz went to work at Mir Yeshiva, where Povarsky was Yechiel Michel Feinstein's roommate.

He married Tzipporah Kreiser, after which he studied under Elchonon Wasserman in Kovno.

Several of his sons became rabbis, including Baruch Dov Povarsky, his successor as rosh yeshiva.

== Works ==
- Yeshuas Dovid (7 volumes)
- Shiurei Reb Dovid Povarsky on various Tractates
- Yishmeru Da'as consisting of various Mussar discourses which he delivered
