= Yosef Shlomo Kahaneman =

Lithuanian rabbi

Maran Hagaon Rabbi Yosef Shlomo Kahaneman
- יוסף שלמה כהנמן
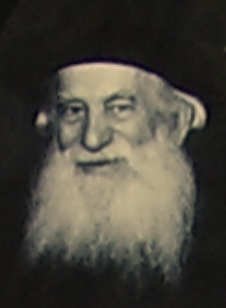

Personal life
- Born: May 13, 1886 Kuliai, Kovno Governorate, Russian Empire
- Died: September 3, 1969 (aged 83) Bnei Brak, Israel
- Children: Avraham Kahaneman
- Education: Telshe yeshiva, Novardok yeshiva, Raduń Yeshiva

Religious life
- Religion: Judaism

Jewish leader
- Yeshiva: Ponevezh Yeshiva
- Organisation: Agudat Yisrael

Yosef Shlomo Kahaneman (Hebrew: יוסף שלמה כהנמן; Yiddish: יוסף שלמה כהנעמאן; Lithuanian: Josifas Šleimė Kahanemanas, known also as the Ponevezher Rav), was an Orthodox rabbi and rosh yeshiva (dean) of the Ponevezh Yeshiva. He was also a member of the Council of Torah Sages of Agudath Israel.

== Biography ==
Kahaneman was born 13 May 1886 in Kuliai, Kovno Governorate of the Russian Empire (present-day Lithuania), a town of about 300, of whom about a third were Jewish.

As a child he attended the yeshiva in Plungė led by Rabbi Chaim Yitzchak Bloch Hacohen. At the age of 14 he went to study Talmud at the Telshe yeshiva, where he studied Torah until he was twenty, under rabbis Eliezer Gordon and Shimon Shkop. He then spent half a year in Novardok yeshiva, after which he spent three years in Raduń Yeshiva studying under the Chofetz Chaim and Rabbi Naftoli Trop.

He married the daughter of the rabbi of Vidzh, and became rabbi there at the end of 1911, when his father-in-law became the rabbi of Vilkomir (Ukmergė). His nephew was Daniel Kahneman, a psychologist and economist.

After Rabbi Yitzhak Yaakov Rabinovich died in 1919 Kahaneman was appointed the new rabbi of Ponevezh. He built three yeshivas there, as well as a school and an orphanage. All of these institutions were destroyed, and many of his students and family killed, during World War II.

He was elected to the Lithuanian parliament. He was also a member of the autonomous National Council of Lithuanian Jewry and an active member and leader of Agudat Yisrael.

The outbreak of World War II caught him during his visit to the British Mandate of Palestine, after which he was intending to visit the United States. Learning about the Red Army's occupation of Lithuania, he decided to stay in Palestine. He continued, from a distance, to oversee the Ponevezh Yeshiva. After the entrance of the Nazis in Ponevezh, the yeshiva was destroyed and all students were murdered. A few years later, in 1944, Kahaneman succeeded in re-establishing the Ponevezh Yeshiva in Bnei Brak. After unsuccessful attempts to save European Jews, Kahaneman focused on developing communities in Palestine, building Kiryat Ha-Yeshiva ("Town of the Yeshiva") in Bnei Brak and Batei Avot orphanages. He also traveled widely in the diaspora to secure financial support for the yeshiva, which he constantly improved and extended. With the help of longtime friend Rav Moshe Okun, Kahaneman succeeded in turning the re-established Ponevezh yeshiva into one of the largest in the world- a leading one among the Litvishe.

He sought to take care of many orphans, especially the Yaldei Tehran ("Children of Tehran") – children who escaped from Nazi Europe by walking across Europe to Tehran - as well as other refugees, among them Biala Rebbe – Rabbi Ben Zion Rabinowitz.

Kahaneman died on 3 September 1969 in Bnei Brak, Israel. After his death the Ponevezh Yeshiva community divided into two over the conflict on leadership.

Kahaneman wrote Talmudic commentaries and an exegesis on the Passover Haggadah, though these - together with transcripts of his lessons - were published only after his death.

=== Opinion on State of Israel and Zionism ===
In contrast to the prevalent Haredi opposition to Zionism, Kahaneman showed signs of support for the State of Israel. He considered the establishment of the State of Israel to have religious significance, especially after the experience of the Holocaust, believing it was God's plan. He is known for insisting that the flag of Israel be flown outside of the Ponevezh Yeshiva on Israel's Independence Day. He also refrained from saying the Tachanun prayer - a daily prayer of penitence - on that day, as a sign of celebration.

He said in an article that Israel's military victories during the Six Day War "obvious miracles", and that "even blind people can sense palpable miracles... the miracles, wonders, salvations... the comforts and battles". Kahaneman opposed the idolization of the Israeli warrior, seen as tough in contrast to Holocaust victims seen as enfeebled.

== See also ==
- Lithuanian Jews
- Ponevezh yeshiva
