= Yeshiva Ohel Torah-Baranovich =

Pre-World War II Yeshiva

Coordinates: 53.13171766°N 26.01837714°E

- מתיבתא רבתא אהל תורה בברנוביץ
- Baranovich; Byelorussian SSR

Information
- Type: Yeshiva
- Religious affiliation: Orthodox Judaism
- Established: c. 1906
- Founder: Rabbi Yosef Yoizel Horowitz
- Closed: 1941
- Rosh yeshiva: Rabbi Elchanan Wasserman

Yeshiva Ohel Torah-Baranovich, commonly referred to as the Baranovich Yeshiva or simply as Baranovich, was an Orthodox Jewish yeshiva in Baranavichy, Belarus (which at its founding was ruled by the Russian Empire and after World War I, the Second Polish Republic). Established circa 1906 by Rabbi Yosef Yoizel Horowitz, the Alter of Novardok (Navahrudak), it attracted leading rabbis such as Rabbi Yisroel Yaakov Lubchansky and Rabbi Avraham Yoffen as instructors, but was forced to disband with the outbreak of World War I. After the war, Rabbi Elchonon Wasserman, a student of the Radin Yeshiva who had been forced into exile in Smilavičy during the hostilities, agreed to serve as rosh yeshiva (dean) upon the recommendation of the Chofetz Chaim. In the interwar period, the yeshiva gained widespread fame and a large student body. Wasserman's style of teaching emphasized the simple meaning of the Talmudic texts and students advanced to the point that they were able to study independently. The yeshiva went into exile and disbanded a second time during World War II, and Wasserman and many of the students were murdered by Lithuanian Nazi sympathizers. Torah institutions named after the Baranovich Yeshiva and Wasserman were later established in the United States and Israel.

== Founding ==
The yeshiva was founded circa 1906 by Rabbi Yosef Yoizel Horowitz, known as the Alter of Novardok, who was establishing mussar yeshivas throughout Russia. Horowitz's daughter, Feiga Malka, was married to Rabbi Yisroel Yaakov Lubchansky, son of Rabbi Chaim Leib Lubchansky of Baranovich, so he turned his attention to strengthening Torah study in this city. Horowitz also motivated Rabbi Chaikel Sofer, an influential Jew living in the city, to supply room and board for the student body, and brought in several rabbis to teach in his yeshiva. In 1914, he introduced his son-in-law, Rabbi Avraham Yoffen, as a lecturer. However, at the end of that year, World War I broke out and the yeshiva was disbanded.

== Post World War I ==
In 1921, the Radin Yeshiva led by the Chofetz Chaim escaped from the anti-religious Soviet Union where they had been exiled to during World War I to their original hometown of Radin. Rabbi Elchonon Wasserman, who was a student of the Chofetz Chaim and who had led the Smilovitz branch of the Radin Yeshiva during the war, was a member of that yeshiva. On their way to Radin, the yeshiva stopped in Baranovich where they stayed for ten days. Although the rest of the yeshiva continued on to Radin, the Chofetz Chaim instructed Wasserman to remain in Baranovich and lead the Ohel Torah yeshiva, which had been reopened by Rabbi Chaikel Sofer.

It was under Wasserman's leadership that the yeshiva gained its widespread fame and a large student body, which eventually numbered in the hundreds.

== Style of learning ==
Unlike advanced yeshivas of the era which accepted only advanced students who had been studying on their own for some time, the Baranovich Yeshiva under Wasserman accepted students who had not yet achieved proficiency in Torah study. Wasserman and the other instructors would guide and groom them to be able to learn the Talmud independently. To that end, students were divided by age and learning level.

There were six lower levels taught by instructors and a seventh level, called the kibbutz, in which students who had completed the lower levels studied independently. The first-level shiur (class) was led by a Rabbi Kreinker, the second level by Rabbi Yoshe Ber Zeldes, the third by a Rabbi Yisrael, the fourth by Rabbi Leib Geviya, the fifth by Rabbi Shlomo Heiman, and the sixth level by the rosh yeshiva, Rabbi Wasserman. After Heiman left in 1927, Wasserman took over his shiur as well. Wasserman also lectured weekly to the kibbutz, and invited Rabbi David Rappoport, author of the sefarim Tzemach David and Mikdash David, to be the deputy rosh yeshiva. Lubchansky served as the mashgiach ruchani.

Even in the fifth and sixth levels, the shiurim (classes) placed heavy emphasis on understanding the "simple" meaning of the text. Instructors would read the text of the Talmud with Rashi and Tosafot aloud, word by word, to the class. Students spent an entire year in the fifth level and a year and a half in the sixth level. Incoming students who had studied independently in other yeshivas and wanted to join the Baranovich Yeshiva were still required to join the fifth level in Baranovich for several years before being admitted into the sixth level. In both these levels they would be exposed to Wasserman's style of Talmud learning and his emphasis on understanding the simple meaning of the text.

Due to Wasserman's style of teaching, his students became well-known and sought after in the advanced yeshivas of Lithuania and Poland. It was known that Baranovich students knew how to learn Talmud by themselves and understand the text on its simplest level.

== Exile and disbandment ==
In addition to delivering shiurim, Wasserman assumed responsibility for the upkeep of the yeshiva, including instructor salaries and food, shelter, and clothing for the student body. He managed to procure funds to construct a proper building for the yeshiva in the 1920s. He traveled frequently to Warsaw and Vilna to fundraise among potential donors, but finances were always tight during the interwar years. Finally, in 1931, Wasserman agreed to travel abroad to fundraise. His first trip to England was successful and he returned again in 1934. In October 1937 he embarked on a 16-month fundraising tour which brought him to several American cities, including New York, Baltimore, Chicago, St. Louis, Boston, Philadelphia, Cincinnati, Detroit, and Denver. With the political situation in Europe deteriorating and the prospect of war looming, he was encouraged to remain in the United States. But he refused, saying that his place was with his students.

Five months after his return to Baranovich, World War II broke out. On the advice of Rabbi Chaim Ozer Grodzensky, the yeshiva (together with others) escaped to Vilnius in Lithuania. In June 1940, when the Red Army invaded and occupied Lithuania, the rosh yeshivas and students who were taking refuge there realized that they would not be able to continue functioning under the Soviets. Wasserman relocated the yeshiva to Semeliškės, a small village near Vilnius. Even there, they could not escape the communists and they were oppressed for keeping the yeshiva open. Students began to leave the yeshiva for safer places or places with more food. Under such difficult conditions, Wasserman in the end encouraged all of his students to leave, although some remained. Wasserman eventually left Semeliškės and went into hiding in Kaunas. A few weeks later, he was kidnapped by Nazi sympathizers and executed in the Seventh Fort. Many of the Baranovich students were murdered as well.

== Legacy ==
In 1953, Wasserman's son, Rabbi Simcha Wasserman, founded Yeshiva Ohr Elchonon (Hebrew: אור אלחנן, "Light of Elchonon") in Los Angeles. In 1977, the yeshiva was sold to Chabad and until today stands as Yeshiva Ohr Elchonon Chabad/West Coast Talmudical Seminary. Wasserman went on to found another Yeshiva Ohr Elchonon in Jerusalem together with Rabbi Moshe Mordechai Chodosh.

In 1997, Rabbi Leib Baron, an alumnus of the yeshiva, founded Yeshiva Ahavas Torah Baranovich in Jerusalem with a beis medrash (undergraduate program) for post-high school boys and a kollel for married men. Although the beis medrash closed in 2000 and the kollel in 2014, the yeshiva is still active, publishing sefarim related to Baranovich as well as running Judaica auctions.

Rabbi Mordechai Lasker, a student of Wasserman in Europe, founded a neighborhood in Bnei Brak called Ramat Elchonon, named after his rebbi.

== Prominent alumni ==
- Rabbi Simcha Sheps
- Rabbi Moshe Shmuel Shapiro
- Rabbi Aryeh Leib Baron
- Rabbi Jacob Symanowitz
- Rabbi Leib Gurwicz
- Rabbi Nochum Partzovitz
- Rabbi Baruch Sorotzkin
- Rabbi Yisrael Mendel Kaplan
- Rabbi Shmuel Berenbaum

== Sources ==
- Fendel, Rabbi Zechariah (2003). Charting the Mesorah: Vol. IV/The Era of the Later Acharonim. Brooklyn, NY: Hashkafah Publications. p. 37.
- Golan, Yehudit (2016). The Night Is Not Dark. Brooklyn, NY: Mesorah Publications, Ltd. ISBN 978-1-4226-1732-8.
- Krohn, Paysach J. (2007). Traveling with the Maggid. Brooklyn, NY: Mesorah Publications, Ltd. ISBN 978-1-4226-0229-4.
- Sorasky, Aaron (2009). Reb Elchonon. Brooklyn, NY: Mesorah Publications, Ltd. ISBN 978-0-89906-450-5.
- Wein, Berel (1990). Triumph of Survival. Brooklyn, NY: Shaar Press/Mesorah Publications Ltd. ISBN 1-4226-1514-6.
