= Yisroel Yaakov Lubchansky =

Rabbi Yisroel Yaakov Lubchansky

Personal life
- Died: 1941 Kovno Ghetto, Kaunas, Reichskommissariat Ostland
- Spouse: Faiga Malka Lubchansky née Horowitz
- Education: Novardok Yeshiva

Religious life
- Religion: Judaism
- Denomination: Orthodox Judaism

Jewish leader
- Predecessor: Rabbi Chaim Leib Lubchansky
- Successor: Rabbi Dovid Waicel
- Synagogue: Baranovich
- Yeshiva: Yeshiva Ohel Torah-Baranovich
- Began: 1921
- Ended: 1941
- Residence: Baranavichy, Poland present-day Belarus

Rabbi Yisroel Yaakov Lubchansky was an Orthodox Jewish rabbi in Baranavichy, Russia. He served as the mashgiach ruchani of the Baranovich Yeshiva there in the mid-twetienth century.

== Early life ==
Born in the mid – late nineteenth century, Rabbi Lubchansky was the son Rabbi Chaim Leib and Chaya Bluma Lubchansky. His father served as the rabbi of Baranovich (Baranavichy) in the Russian Empire (now in Belarus). In his youth, he studied Torah with his father before going go study in the Novardok Yeshiva of Rabbi Yosef Yozel Horowitz. During his time in the yeshiva, he absorbed Rabbi Horowitz's hashkafos.

== Rabbinic career ==
After the death of his father in 1906, he was appointed as rabbi of Baranovich, but soon gave the position up to his sister's husband, Rabbi Dovid Waicel.

With the outbreak of World War I, Rabbi Lubchansky remained in Russia, staying with his father-in-law's family. During this time, he headed the branches of the Navodrok Yeshiva in Kharkiv (now in Ukraine), Tsaritsyn, and elsewhere. After the war, he returned to Baranovich, where his mother still lived.

=== Baranovich Yeshiva ===
Originally established in 1906 by Rabbi Horowitz, the Baranovich Yeshiva was disbanded during World War I. In 1921, it was reestablished and Rabbi Elchonon Wasserman was appointed as its rosh yeshiva; he immediately appointed Rabbi Lubchansky as mashgiach ruchani. In this role, he was known to be extremely devoted to his students, often crying in prayer for their growth. He was also known to have a strong influence over them, as well as a boundless love for them. Dozens of his students would eat their meals at his home, at his own expense.

Rabbi Lubchansky's influence in Baranovich was not only felt in the yeshiva but throughout the city's Jewish community. On Friday afternoons, he and Rabbi Wasserman would visit the stores owned by non-religious Jews and encourage them to close their stores for Shabbos. (Note: In Jewish law, business is forbidden on Shabbos, which begins on Friday evening and ends Saturday evening.)

== Home of orphans ==
Although they were childless, Rabbi Lubchansky and his wife raised several orphans in their home. His sister, Merreh Gittel Eisen had died sometime between 1913 and 1925, leaving her four children in the care of their father, Efraim Yehoshua Eisen. He however died soon after in the 1920s, and their four children moved into the Lubchansky home. One of these children, Vichna Eisen, later Vichna Kaplan, went on to found Beth Jacob of Borough Park.

== World War II and death ==
After World War I, Baranovich had come under Polish rule, and with the outbreak of World War II in 1939, it became part of the Soviet Union. Like many yeshivas that were escaping the warfront at that time, the Baranovich Yeshiva fled to Vilnius in Lithuania, later relocating to Trakai and then Semeliškės. Both Rabbi Wasserman and Rabbi Lubchansky traveled with the yeshiva during this time, remaining at their posts. However in 1941, Rabbi Lubchansky heard that the Soviets were looking to arrest him and he went into hiding in Kaunas. Less than two weeks after his arrival, the Nazis invaded of Lithuania, and set up the Kovno Ghetto where all the Jews in the area were forced to live. There, he tried to encourage and uplift downtrodden others. He was murdered by the Nazis a short time after.
