= Yeshiva Ohr Elchonon =

Yeshiva Ohr Elchonon may refer to:

- Yeshiva Ohr Elchonon (Jerusalem), a Jerusalem-based yeshiva
- Yeshiva Ohr Elchonon Chabad/West Coast Talmudical Seminary, a Los Angeles-based yeshiva
