= Vichna Kaplan =

Rebbetzin Vichna Kaplan
- Born: Vichna Eisen c. 1913; Slonim, Belarus
- Died: August 20, 1986 (aged 72–73); Brooklyn, New York, United States
- Education: Bais Yaakov Teachers Seminary, Kraków
- Occupations: Teacher, girls' school dean
- Years active: 1938–1986
- Known for: Founder and dean of Bais Yaakov High School and Bais Yaakov Teachers Seminary, Brooklyn, New York
- Spouse: Rabbi Boruch Kaplan
- Children: 13

Vichna Kaplan (1913 – August 20, 1986) was a Russian-born American Orthodox Jewish teacher and school dean who, together with her husband Rabbi Boruch Kaplan, brought the Bais Yaakov movement to America. A prize pupil of Sarah Schenirer, the founder of Bais Yaakov in Poland, Kaplan opened the first Bais Yaakov High School in Williamsburg, New York, in 1938. She later opened the first Bais Yaakov Teachers Seminary (1941), which provided teachers for all Bais Yaakov schools that subsequently opened in America and Israel.

== Biography ==
=== Early life ===
Vichna Eisen was born in Slonim, Russian Empire, around 1913. Her parents, Ephraim Yehoshua Eisen and Merreh Gittel Lubchansky, daughter of Rabbi Chaim Leib Lubchansky, the Rav of Baronovitch, both died before her eleventh birthday. She and her brother Dovid were raised by their aunt and uncle, Rabbi Yisroel Yaakov Lubchansky, mashgiach ruchani of the Baranovitch yeshiva, who were childless.

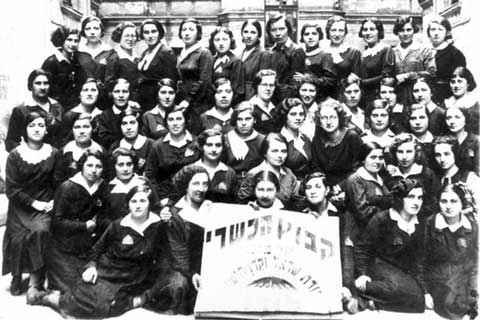
The Bais Yaakov graduating class of 1934 in Łódź, Poland.

Vichna applied to the Bais Yaakov Teachers Seminary in Kraków at the age of 16. Her application was rejected because she lacked a government-recognized high school diploma; her uncle had not allowed her to attend the non-religious gymnasium school. She wrote to Sarah Schenirer and was accepted to the seminary after taking private lessons to earn her diploma. Since the Lubchanskys could not afford to pay tuition, she also received a scholarship from the school. Lauded for her "superb intelligence, phenomenal memory, and unblemished character", she epitomized what Schenirer was trying to achieve in a Bais Yaakov student and became Schenirer's closest disciple and confidante.

After completing the two-year course of study, she was sent to Brisk, Poland, where she served as the sole religious studies teacher at the Bais Yaakov school in that city for the next five years. Her teaching skills were noticed by Rabbi Yitzchok Zev Soloveitchik, the Brisker Rav, who praised her ability to imbue students with Torah knowledge and fear of Heaven.

=== Marriage and move to America ===
In 1936 she was introduced to Rabbi Boruch Kaplan, an American student who, through the efforts of Rabbi Yaakov Yosef Herman, had studied at the Chevron Yeshiva, Mir, Kaminetz, and Brisk yeshivas. After they met, Kaplan returned to America during Hanukkah 1936 and they corresponded by mail. As a condition for the shidduch (match), his family insisted that the couple live in America. At that time, the American lifestyle was perceived as detrimental to families wishing to live according to Torah values. Vichna's uncle privately thought that she should refuse to leave Europe, but advised her to consult with the Brisker Rav. The Rav assured her, "With Rav Boruch, you can go wherever he wants". The couple was engaged by mail in 1936 and married on August 8, 1937, eleven days after Vichna arrived in New York City.

The young couple had an apartment at 134 South 9th Street, in the Williamsburg section of Brooklyn, a heavily Jewish neighborhood. It was in this apartment that they started Bais Yaakov of Williamsburg.

The Kaplans had nine sons and four daughters.

== Career in education ==
Before leaving Poland, Vichna received permission from Rabbi Yehuda Leib Orlean, head of the central Bais Yaakov office, to open a Bais Yaakov school in New York. While Bais Yaakov elementary schools did exist in New York at that time, hers was the first religious high school for Jewish girls. She started the school with seven students around her dining-room table in Williamsburg in 1938. Two of her first students were the daughters of Rabbi Shraga Feivel Mendlowitz of Mesivta Torah Vodaas, who told her, "Take my daughters and build a seminary around them". The Mendlowitz girls brought five friends, and classes began.

The school outgrew Kaplan's South 9th Street apartment, as did the Kaplkan's growing family. The Kaplans and the school first moved to 240 Keap Street, the first of a series of moves to additional rented locations, until settling into its own building at 143 South 8th Street in Williamsburg. The Keap street location was a double irony, in that it was directly across the street from Eastern District High School (EDHS), a massive school building. EDHS is where her students would have been schooled if not for the new Bais Yakkov. When EDHS moved to a new location in 1981, the Satmar bought the building, and their Bais Yaakov (which goes by the name Bais Ruchel) moved in.

In 1944 Kaplan was able to transform the Bais Yaakov into an all-day high school. A dormitory was opened for out-of-town American students, students from Canada, and European refugees. At that point, Rabbi Boruch Kaplan, a successful maggid shiur at Yeshiva Torah Vodaas, left his position to become school administrator. The Kaplans also opened a summer learning camp at Engel's Farm in Connecticut, in the tradition of the summer camps Schenirer had run in Poland.

Unlike most of today's Bais Yaakov students, Kaplan's early high-school students were often not from religious homes. Concepts like tzeniut (modesty) had to be taught with warmth and sensitivity. Besides general and Torah studies, the girls were encouraged to take their education to the next level and become teachers in the Bais Yaakov movement. Bais Yaakov also inspired Jewish girls with the willingness to marry young men dedicated to full-time kollel study, which would necessitate a lower standard of living than that commonly accepted in America.

Kaplan hired many graduates of the Kraków seminary to teach in the first Bais Yaakov high school. These included Rebbetzins Chava Pincus, Basya Bender, Chava Wachtfogel, Rivka Springer, Chana Rottenberg, Rochel Cizner, Shifra Yudasin, Batsheva Hutner, and Leah Goldstein. These teachers forged a connection between their American students and the founder of Bais Yaakov, Sarah Schenirer, by speaking often about their mentor and her lessons. Kaplan herself recalled Schenirer at every Rosh Chodesh assembly. Before she made any decision for her school, Kaplan asked herself, "What would Sarah Schenirer say to this?"

In 1958 the Kaplans opened a Boro Park branch of Bais Yaakov, which eventually superseded the Williamsburg location. The school continued to expand into elementary, high school and seminary programs. All other Bais Yaakov schools that later opened in America and Israel trace their history to Kaplan's original school, through the teachers Kaplan sent to staff them and the advice she gave to found them. The fiftieth yahrtzeit gathering for Schenirer in Madison Square Garden in 1985, which Kaplan organized, was attended by thousands of students of Bais Yaakov schools established in Hasidic, yeshivish, and Modern Orthodox communities with staff members drawn from the Bais Yaakov Teachers Seminary. Seven thousand girls converged on the sixtieth yahrtzeit gathering at the Brooklyn Armory in Williamsburg in 1995.

== Other activities ==
During World War II, when the Bais Yaakov movement in Poland was decimated by the murder of teachers and students in the Holocaust, the Kaplans applied for thousands of student visas for war refugees. Despite the skepticism of United States immigration officials, who could not believe that one institution could support so many refugees, the Kaplans rescued more European Jewish girls than any other American institution.

== Death and legacy ==
Still active as dean of the Bais Yaakov Teachers Seminary, Kaplan died on August 20, 1986 (15 Av 5746). Her daughter, Rebbetzin Frumie Kirzner, succeeded her as dean of the Bais Yaakov Teachers Seminary. Rabbi Boruch Kaplan died on April 7, 1996 (18 Nisan 5756).

Rabbi Aharon Kotler, rosh yeshiva of Beth Medrash Govoha (the Lakewood Yeshiva), credited the Kaplans and their Bais Yaakov for ensuring the growth of Torah in America. Kotler said:

If not for Rav Boruch and Rebbetzin Vichna Kaplan who started large scale Bais Yaakov on these shores, there would be no true appreciation for a Ben Torah; for an aspiring Talmid Chacham; for a life consecrated to Torah. There would be no willingness to forgo material comfort for the sake of Talmud Torah: "There would be no Kollelim in America!"

Similarly, Rabbi Yoel Teitelbaum, the Satmar Rebbe, said that his school, Bais Ruchel, would not have succeeded without the graduates of Bais Yaakov, who served as its first teachers. The Rebbe also sent a message to Rabbi Boruch Kaplan "thanking him for making it easier for his boys to find suitable shidduchim (marriage partners)".

== Sources ==
- Tzipora Weinberg interviews Rebbetzin Danielle Liebowitz on Rebbetzin Vichna Kaplan's impact on her life and the lives of her students.Veiled Reference: Principal of Faith
- Binah supplement: "Seamstress of Souls: Legacy of Bais Yaakov", November 2010.
- Rebbetzin Danielle S. Liebowitz with Devora Gliksman, Rebbetzin Vichna Kaplan : the founder of the Bais Yaakov Movement in America. Jerusalem : Feldheim, 2016.
