= Ausieniškės Manor =

Coordinates: 54°47′24″N 24°46′51″E

Ausieniškės Manor is a former residential manor in Ausieniškės village in the municipality of Elektrėnai, Lithuania.
