= Kietaviškių gausa =

Vegetable grower in Lithuania

Kietaviškių gausa, UAB
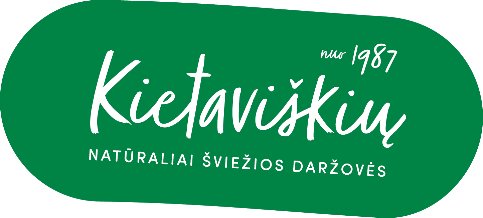

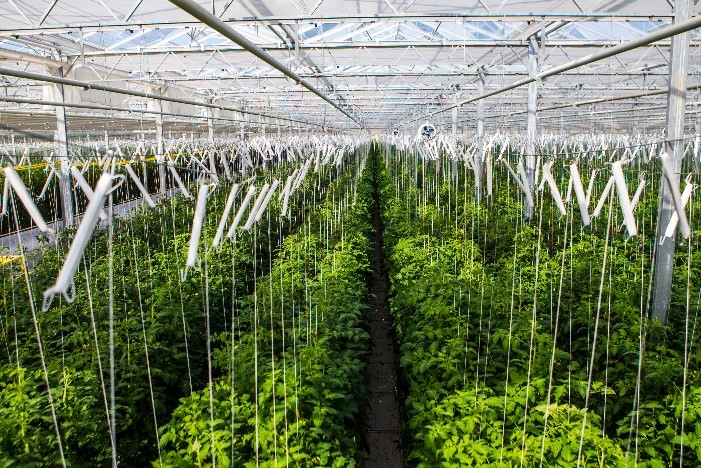
- Founded: 1987
- Headquarters: Kietaviškės village, Elektrėnai Municipality, Lithuania
- Area served: 20 ha of cultivated area
- Products: vegetables
- Revenue: €14.735 million (2022)
- Operating income: €3.725 million (2022)
- Net income: €3.412 million (2022)
- Total assets: €4 million (2022)
- Total equity: €11.252 million (2022)
- Number of employees: 230
- Website: Official website

Kietaviškių gausa is the largest vegetable growing company in the Baltic states. It was established in 1987 in Kietaviškės village next to Elektrėnai. More than 8,000 tons of vegetables, tomatoes, cucumbers and lettuce in pots are produced in the complex of greenhouses covering the area of 20 hectares. Following modernisation in 2016, greenhouses were installed with artificial growing systems, becoming the first such growing in Lithuania, growing all year round. The modernisation cost 15 million euros, of which 10 million euros was paid by the European Union. And the company was financed with a 7.16 million Euro loan from SEB Bank. In 2017, the company was granted 6.5 million euros in government grants. The company operates 20 individual greenhouses. The company sells some of its produce under its own-label. In 2018, the company paid 801,000 euros in taxes.
