= David Rappoport =

Belarusian Haredi rabbi

Rabbi David Rappoport רב דוד הכהן רפפורט

Personal life
- Born: 1890 Minsk, Russian Empire; Present-day Belarus
- Died: September 23, 1941 (aged 50–51) Medvezhegorsk, Soviet Union; Present-day Russia
- Spouse: Fruma Rappoport-Segal
- Parents: Rabbi Akiva Rappoport (father); Chaya Sara Rappoport (mother)

Religious life
- Religion: Judaism

Jewish leader
- Position: Rosh yeshiva
- Yeshiva: Yeshiva Ohel Torah-Baranovich
- Began: 1928
- Ended: 1941
- Main work: Tzemach David; Mikdash David
- Yahrtzeit: (ב תשרי (ראש השנה ב

Rabbi David HaKohen Rappoport (Hebrew: רב דוד הכהן רפפורט) (1890 – September 23, 1941) was an Orthodox Jewish rabbi in Baranovich, Belarus (then part of Poland). He is known for leading Yeshiva Ohel Torah in Baranovich alongside Rabbi Elchonon Wasserman.

== Early life ==
Rabbi Rappoport was born in Minsk, Russian Empire, in 1890. As a youngster, David would study Torah in the synagogues and shteiblach (small synagogues) of Minsk, with barely any instruction. Even during the night, after his family would go sleep, he would leave the house to study Torah until dawn, after which he'd come home for a short nap, and awaken at the same time as the others in his home.

During World War I, the family had to escape Minsk and found refuge in the German city of Danzig, where his father was appointed as the rabbi of the city's Orthodox community. Soon after his arrival in Danzig however, R' David left to Vilna, the home of many distinguished Torah scholars, and soon traveled to learn in Ponevezh Yeshiva. He wrote his first sefer, Tzemach David, a work in which he provided answers for many of the difficulties of Rabbi Akiva Eiger, around that time. He was also learned in other subjects, knowledgeable in the sciences and able to decipher Egyptian hieroglyphics. Two years later he joined the Kovno Kollel, then under the leadership of the Alter of Slabodka (Rabbi Nosson Tzvi Finkel), who had the sefer Tzemach David published at the Kollel's expense. Soon after, Rabbi Rappoport wrote his second sefer, titled Mikdash David, which consisted of five volumes (four of which survived World War II).

At some point, he married his wife, Fruma Rappoport-Segal.

== Baranovich Yeshiva ==
Rabbi Rappoport's reputation as a high-level Torah scholar spread far and wide. When Rabbi Shlomo Heiman left his teaching position at the Baranovich Yeshiva, the rosh yeshiva, Rabbi Elchonon Wasserman, reached out to Rabbi Rappoport and invited him to give shiurim (classes) at the yeshiva. Rabbi Wasserman specifically liked how Rabbi Rappoport learned Gemara, looking to find the simplest meaning in its texts. Rabbi Wasserman learned in a similar style. When Rabbi Rappoport came to Baranovich, he became a deputy-rosh yeshiva. Twice a week, he would teach to the older students of the yeshiva, in great depth; students often came to his house to engage him in learned discussions. His love for his students was renowned; he was paid a meager salary, and yet he shared his meals with hungry students and sometimes would press the few pennies he had left into their hands.

=== World War II ===
With the outbreak of World War II, the yeshiva escaped Poland to Vilna, and then to Troki and Smilishoki. Rabbi Rappoport came with the yeshiva on their travels, never ceasing his teaching. On June 21, 1941, which was a Shabbos Parshas Shelach, he was arrested by the Communists and sentenced to forced labor in a remote Russian concentration camp in Medvezhegorsk, near the Russian-Finnish border. His refusal to eat non-kosher food or even food cooked in non-kosher pots caused him severe intestinal ailments, and he was transferred to the camp hospital, where he died, on September 23, 1941.

== Sources ==
- Sorasky, Aaron (November 1996). Reb Elchonon. Brooklyn, NY: Mesorah Publications, Ltd. ISBN 0-89906-450-7.
