= Simcha Sheps =

Haredi rabbi

Rabbi Simcha Avraham HaKohen Sheps
- On Purim with his students

Personal life
- Born: April 18, 1908 Wysokie Mazowieckie, Russian Empire present-day Poland
- Died: November 5, 1998 (aged 90)
- Buried: Mount of Olives Jewish Cemetery
- Spouse: Sora Weitzman
- Parent: Simon (father)
- Education: Yeshivas Ohel Torah-Baranovich; Yeshivas Mir; Yeshivas Brisk

Religious life
- Religion: Judaism
- Yeshiva: Yeshiva Torah Vodaas
- Position: Rosh Yeshiva
- Yahrtzeit: ט"ז מרחשון תשנט

Simcha Avraham Sheps (April 18, 1908 – November 5, 1998) was an American Orthodox rabbi. He served as rosh yeshiva (dean) of Yeshiva Torah Vodaas.

== Early life ==
Simcha Sheps was born to Simon Sheps in Wysokie Mazowieckie, Russian Empire (currently in Poland). His father died when he was an infant, and Sheps was raised by his mother and his grandfather in the nearby town of Sheptakova. At the age of eleven, he went to study in the Yeshiva Ketana of Bransk, and then in Łomża. After his bar mitzva, Sheps went to study in Yeshivas Ohel Torah-Baranovich, where he learned under Dovid Rappaport (the Mikdash Dovid), Leib Gavia, and Elchonon Wasserman. In 1927, he went to study in the Mir Yeshiva, where he became one of the "lions of the yeshiva" (a term used to describe the top students). In 1934, he was one of elite students chosen to go study in the Brisker Yeshiva under Yitzchok Zev Soloveitchik, but he declined, as he felt humbled alongside Yonah Minsker, another of the Mirrer students chosen. In 1936, he was offered the chance again, and this time he accepted. Among the other students chosen were Leib Gurwicz, Ephraim Mordechai Ginzburg, Aryeh Leib Malin, and Yechiel Michel Feinstein. Sheps was greatly influenced by Soloveitchik during his years in Brisk, and considered him his primary rebbi. He remained there for two years, and in 1937, Sheps returned to the Mir Yeshiva.

With the outbreak of World War II, Sheps fled with the Mir Yeshiva to Vilna, and from there to Kobe, Japan via the Trans-Siberian Railway and a short boat ride. In Kobe, many of the yeshiva students wanted the American Embassy to grant them entrance to the United States. In his interview at the embassy, Sheps was asked how he planned to support himself in the United States. He answered the question by saying that he will publish a translation of the Bible and commentaries. Ultimately, he was one of the few people allowed into the United States from Japan.

== Rabbinic career ==
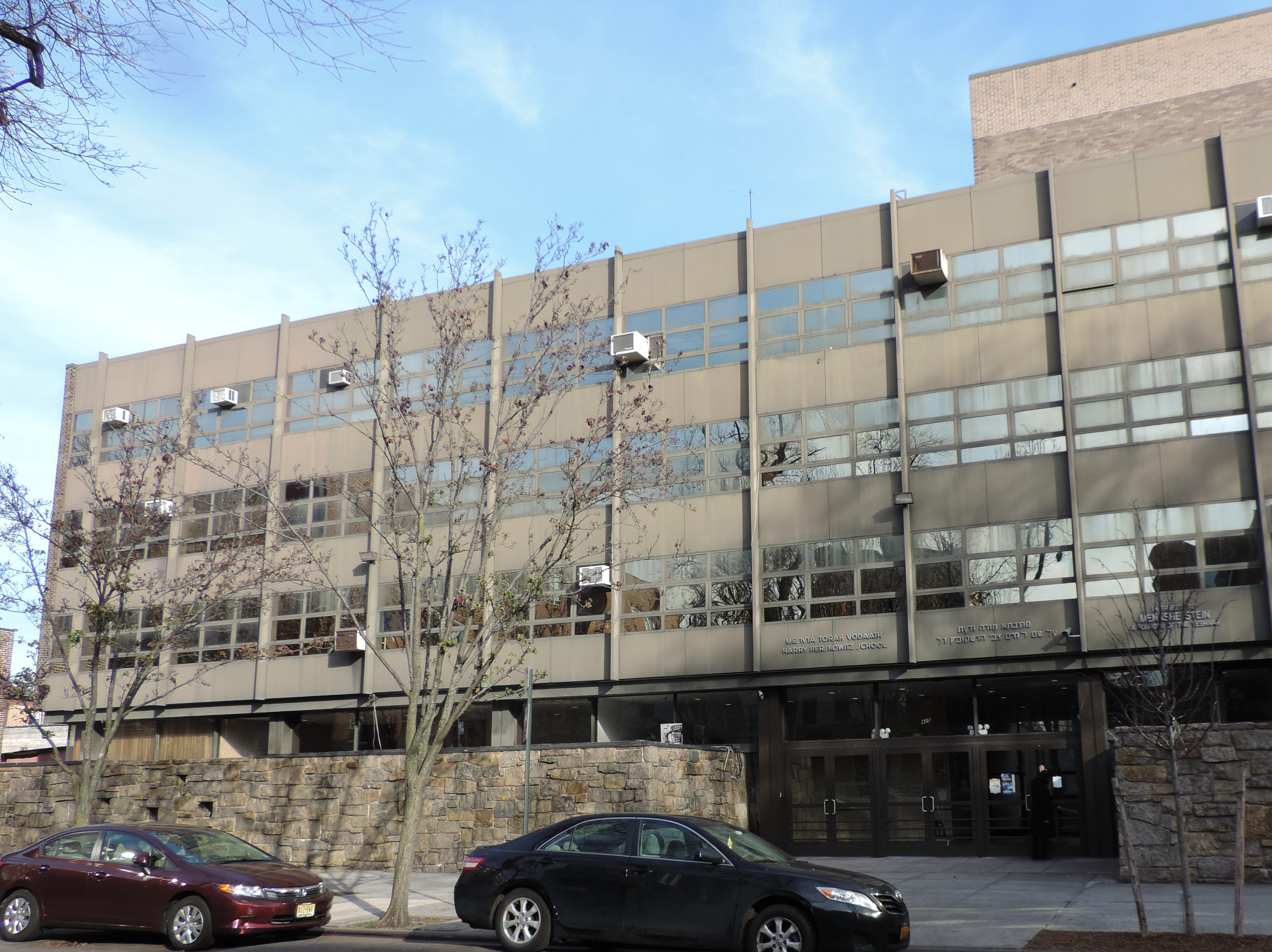
Yeshiva Torah Vodaath

Upon his arrival in New York, Sheps joined the staff of Yeshiva Torah Vodaath. In 1942, he married Sora Weitzman, and Shlomo Heiman, the rosh yeshiva of Torah Vodaath at the time, walked him down to the chuppah (marriage canopy). In 1943, when Heiman became ill, Sheps took over giving his shiur (class). Heiman also arranged for Sheps to learn with Joe Rosenzweig, a person with no yeshiva education who wanted to learn the Torah. Together, they wrote a Chumash and Rashi translation titled The Pentateuch and Rashi's Commentary, A Linear Translation into English, with Sheps going under the pen-name "Abraham ben Isaiah" (his second name being Avraham and his grandfather's name being Isaiah). Together with his brother-in-law, Benjamin Sharfman, Sheps formed the S.S. and R. Publishing Company, through which his translation on Chumash and Rashi was published. His students never knew that their rebbi was the author of the work.

Sheps suffered from a life-threatening illness during the 48 years that he taught at Yeshiva Torah Vodaath. Nevertheless, he continued giving his shiur with energy and excitement, which he passed on to his thousands of students. Sheps died on November 5, 1998 (Hebrew date: 16 MarCheshvan 5759), and was buried in the Mount of Olives Jewish Cemetery in Jerusalem. Many of his drashos (lectures) and shmuessen (talks) were recorded by his students and published in a sefer titled Moreshes Simchas HaTorah. His shiurim on Bava Kama were published by his family in Sefer Divrei Simcha.

== See also ==
- Chiune Sugihara
