= Allan Nadler =

American rabbi & academic (born 1954)

Allan L. Nadler (born May 8, 1954) is Wallerstein Professor Emeritus of Religious Studies and Former Director of the Jewish Studies Program at Drew University in Madison, New Jersey.

== Biography ==
Nadler was born in Montreal, Quebec, and was educated at McGill and Harvard University, where he received his doctorate in 1988.

He was initially ordained as an Orthodox rabbi by Rabbi Aryeh Leib Baron (1911–2011) of Yeshiva Merkaz ha-Talmud in Montreal, and received a second ordination from the late rabbinical scholar, Rabbi Zvi Hirsch Tennenbaum, Chief Justice, or Dayan of the Orthodox Rabbinical Court of Justice (which authorizes the "KVH" Kosher Supervision) in Boston. He studied Talmud and Rabbinical Codes for in the Rabbinical Program at Jews' College in London, England, under the tutelage of Rabbi Dr. Nachum Rabinovitch, and also studied privately for five years with Montreal's Chief Rabbi Pinchas Hirschsprung.

Nadler was the Rabbi of The Charles River Park Synagogues in Boston, at the time an ostensibly Orthodox congregation, with a mixed seating section, and was a member of the Boston Vaad HaRabonim, serving as a Dayan, or judge, on its Rabbinical Court from 1980 to 1982.

During the period 1984–1992, Nadler became Rabbi of Congregation Shaar Hashomayim in Montreal, Quebec. Nadler was the first Orthodox-ordained rabbi at this formerly Conservative congregation, which left the Conservative Movement during his tenure. During that time he was adjunct professor of Jewish Studies at McGill University. After resigning from the Shaar Hashomayim, he served as Director of Research of the YIVO Institute in New York City (1992–1999), which holds the world's largest Yiddish and Holocaust Archives and Library.

While at YIVO he served as Rabbi of the Fort Tryon Jewish Center in New York City, an independent Traditional synagogue, and was a visiting professor of Jewish Studies at New York University (1992–1995) and Cornell University (1995–1998).

Also while at YIVO, Nadler led efforts to repatriate libraries, archives and Torah scrolls in Lithuania that had been plundered and confiscated by the Nazis, and later held by Soviet authorities. His direct negotiations with then-President of Lithuania, Algirdas Brazauskas, led to the release in 1993, to the New York City offices of YIVO for reproduction and cataloguing, of almost 100 crates of archives that had belonged to YIVO in pre-war Vilna (today, Vilnius, Lithuania).

While on a Sabbatical from Drew University during the 2011–2012 academic year, Nadler was appointed distinguished Visiting Professor at the College of Charleston, in South Carolina, a post which he left after the Fall semester to take a visiting professorship at McGill in January, 2012.

Rabbi Nadler retired from Drew University in 2018 and was named Wallerstein Professor Emeritus of Jewish Studies.

== Criticism of Hasidism ==
Nadler has been an outspoken Orthodox Rabbinical critic of the Chabad-Lubavitch Hasidic movement for the past four decades, having published criticism of both the right-wing political stances of the late Lubavitcher Rebbe, Menachem Mendel Shcneerson, and in particular the messianic stance taken by the majority of Chabad Hasidim that views "the Rebbe" as he messiah. His criticisms of the Rebbe and the messianic fervor he had fomented within Chabad have been published in The New York Times, the Canadian Jewish News' Viewpoints literary supplement, The New Republic, Moment Magazine, the Forward and other periodicals. Nadler has also been a frequent critic of non-Hasidic (or Mitnagdic) Haredi rabbis and institutions, including the Dean of one of America's most prominent Yeshivas (Rabbinical schools), Lakewood, New Jersey's Beth Medrash Govoha, Rabbi Aryeh Malkiel Kotler, whom he accused, in The Forward, of approving a racist, anti-Gentile book, "Sefer Romemut Yisrael", written by one of the Yeshiva's students.

== As author ==
Nadler's 1997 book, The Faith of the Mithnagdim: Rabbinic Responses to Hasidic Rapture, to date the definitive scholarly study of the Jewish antagonists of Hasidic Judaism, commonly known as Misnagdim, is an investigation of the theology of the rabbis who opposed the Hasidic movement in late 18th–early 19th century Eastern Europe.

== Bibliography ==
- Nadler, Allan, "The Faith of the Mithnagdim: Rabbinic Responses to Hasidic Rapture" (Baltimore: The Johns Hopkins University Press, 1997)
