= Simcha Wasserman =

Russian-born rabbi

Rabbi Simcha Wasserman
- שמחה וסרמן

Personal life
- Born: Elazar Simcha Wasserman; 1899 Russian Empire
- Died: October 29, 1992 (aged 92–93) Jerusalem, Israel
- Buried: Har HaMenuchos
- Spouse: Feiga Rachel Abowitz
- Parents: Rabbi Elchonon Wasserman (father); Michla Wasserman (mother)

Religious life
- Religion: Judaism
- Denomination: Orthodox Judaism
- Yeshiva: Yeshiva Ohr Elchonon (Los Angeles)
- Position: Rosh yeshiva
- Other: Rosh yeshiva, Yeshiva Ohr Elchonon (Jerusalem)

Elazar Simcha Wasserman (Hebrew: אלעזר שמחה וסרמן; 1898 - October 29, 1992) was an Orthodox rabbi and rosh yeshiva. Born in the Russian Empire, he was sent before World War II to the United States by his father, Rabbi Elchonon Wasserman, to improve the level of Jewish education there. He established yeshivas in the United States and Israel. He was described as "a pioneer educator".

== Early life and family ==
Elazar Simcha Wasserman was born in the Russian Empire, the eldest of the three sons born to Elchonon Wasserman and his wife Michla. He was a nephew of Rabbi Chaim Ozer Grodzensky. He married Feiga Rachel, the daughter of Rabbi Meir Abowitz, Rav of Novordok, and his wife Chana.

Except for him and his brother David, all his birth family died during World War II. He and his wife, who outlived him, had no children.

== Career ==
Although most of his career was in the United States, Wasserman established his first rabbinical seminary in Strasbourg in 1933. During the 1940s Wasserman strengthened Detroit's Yeshiva Beth Yehudah and served as dean. It had been founded in 1914 as a Talmud Torah and renamed as a yeshiva in 1925.

== Yeshiva Ohr Elchonon ==
Two of the schools founded by Wasserman were named Yeshiva Ohr Elchonon, one in the United States, the other in Israel.

The school in Los Angeles included elementary, secondary, college, and post-graduate classes, with some students "from as far as Arizona and Colorado". Ten of the initial students at the college and post-graduate school were sent from Yeshiva Torah Vodaas, handpicked by Rabbi Gedalia Schorr. This was well before the school attained 300 students.

== Outreach ==
Among the keywords describing Wasserman's methodology are patience and simplicity: "Whatever is within my ability to fulfill I do, and whatever I can’t accomplish I don’t worry about."

In 1970 he wrote an article for The Jewish Observer titled "Memorandum To: Concerned individuals From: Rabbi Simcha Wasserman Re: Reaching out" in which he encourages more outreach "to the entire Jewish community," adding that "Unless the public is Torah educated, the Yeshiva contributor will soon be supplanted by the philanthropist whose list of priorities does not even include Yeshivos."

He was not a fan of "new and improved" when it came to Judaism: "... the plastic potato. It looked like a potato, smelled like a potato, even tasted like a potato .. the only significant difference .. was that when you planted a plastic potato, it didn’t grow, it couldn’t reproduce, it was sterile."

== Works ==
While in Israel he facilitated the reprinting of his father's works; some of his own writings were printed in a booklet, Simchat Elazar.

== Sources ==
- Sorasky, Aaron (2009). Reb Elchonon. Brooklyn, NY: Mesorah Publications, Ltd. ISBN 978-0-89906-450-5.
