= Kietaviškės Eldership =

Eldership of Lithuania

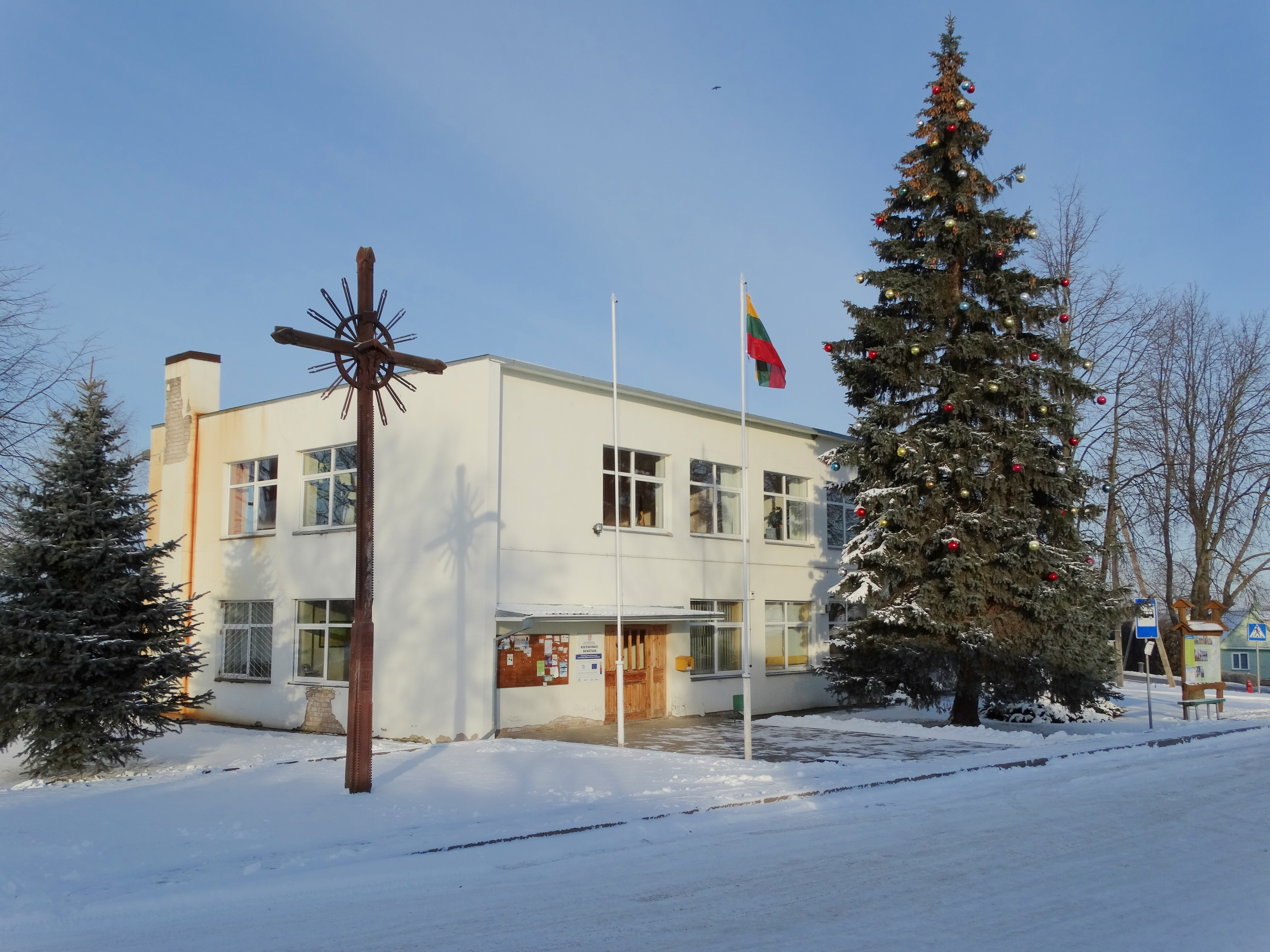

The Kietaviškės Eldership (Lithuanian: Kietaviškių seniūnija) is an eldership of Lithuania, located in the Elektrėnai Municipality. In 2021 its population was 1257.
