= Semeliškės Eldership =

Eldership of Lithuania

The Semeliškės Eldership (Lithuanian: Semeliškių seniūnija) is an eldership of Lithuania, located in the Elektrėnai Municipality. In 2021 its population was 1024.
