= Ezra Schochet =

American rabbi

Rabbi Ezra Schochet

Personal life
- Born: Ezra Binyomin Schochet
- Spouse: Sara Rochel Weinberg, Batsheva Wolf
- Children: 6
- Parent(s): Rabbi Dov Yehuda Schochet; Sara Sosha Mussensohn
- Education: Ner Israel Rabbinical College (Baltimore); Beth Medrash Govoha; Yeshivas Brisk (Jerusalem)

Religious life
- Religion: Judaism
- Denomination: Orthodox Judaism

Jewish leader
- Predecessor: Rabbi Simcha Wasserman
- Yeshiva: Yeshiva Ohr Elchonon Chabad/West Coast Talmudical Seminary
- Position: Rosh yeshiva
- Began: 1977
- Other: Rosh yeshiva, Tomchei Temimim, Lod, Israel; Rosh kollel, Ner Israel, Toronto, Canada
- Residence: Los Angeles, California, US
- Semikhah: Tel Aviv and Jerusalem Rabbinical Courts

Ezra Binyomin Schochet (Hebrew: עזרא בנימין שוחט) is an Orthodox rabbi and Lubavitcher Hasid who serves as Rosh Yeshiva (dean) of Yeshiva Ohr Elchonon Chabad/West Coast Talmudical Seminary in Los Angeles, California, US.

== Early life and education ==
Ezra Binyomin Schochet is one of six sons and four daughters of Rabbi Dov Yehuda Schochet (d. 1974) and Sara Sosha Mussensohn. His father was the Chief Rabbi of Basel, Switzerland from 1930 until 1947. Shortly after immigrating to Toronto in the early 1950s, the Schochets and most of their children joined the Chabad-Lubavitch movement, including young Ezra. His brothers included Rabbi Dr. Jacob Immanuel Schochet (1935–2013).

Schochet undertook his yeshiva education at Ner Israel Rabbinical College (1959–1960) in Baltimore, MD, Beth Medrash Govoha (1960–1963) in Lakewood, New Jersey, and Yeshivas Brisk in Jerusalem, Israel (1963–1966). After his marriage, he studied at the Kollel of Radomsk in Bnei Brak (1967–1972). He received rabbinic ordination from both the Tel Aviv Rabbinical Court and the Jerusalem Rabbinical Court between 1971 and 1972.

== Rosh Yeshiva ==
Rabbi Schochet assumed the position of rosh yeshiva of Tomchei Temimim in Lod, Israel, from 1972 to 1973. He returned to Canada and headed the kollel of Ner Israel in Toronto from 1974 to 1978.

In 1977, he became rosh yeshiva of Yeshiva Ohr Elchonon in Los Angeles, which had been given over to the directorship of Chabad. Chabad transferred a group of Lubavitcher students from New York to bolster the yeshiva. Schochet is also the yeshiva's CEO, curriculum supervisor, and senior professor of Talmud.

== Personal ==
Schochet married Sara Rochel Weinberg (1944–2010), a granddaughter of the Slonimer Rebbe, in 1967. Weinberg died in 2010. In 2011 Schochet married Batsheva Wolf from Israel.

Rabbi Schochet has three sons and three daughters. His son Rabbi Avraham Shmuel Shochet, a Talmudic scholar, teaches in his father's Yeshiva. Two of Schochet's sons-in-law, as well as some of his grandchildren, are part of the Yeshiva faculty.
