= Pastrėvys Eldership =

Eldership of Lithuania

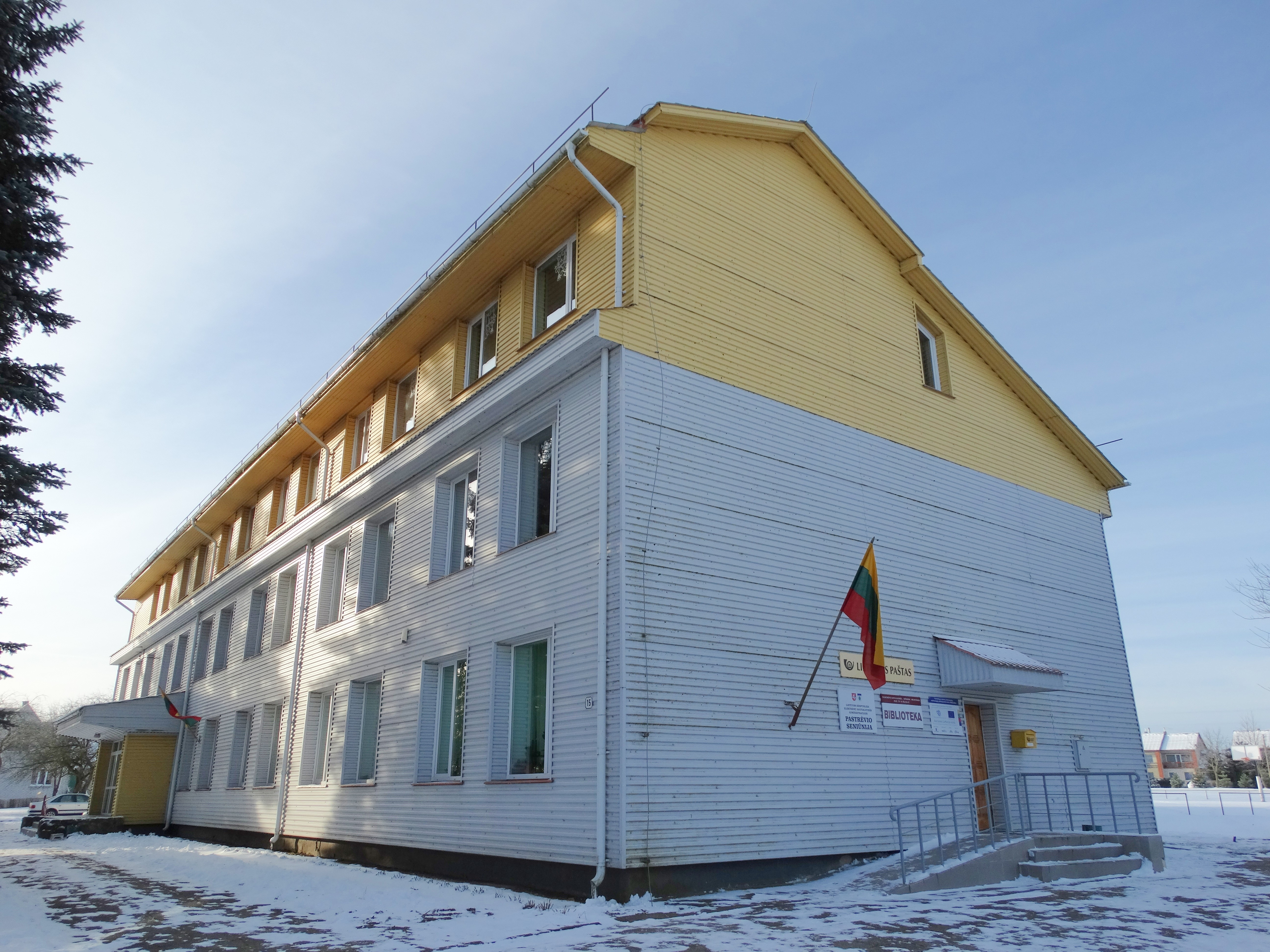
A photo inside Pastrėvys Eldership

The Pastrėvys Eldership (Lithuanian: Pastrėvio seniūnija) is an eldership of Lithuania, located in the Elektrėnai Municipality. In 2021 its population was 641.
