= Beižionys Eldership =

Eldership of Lithuania

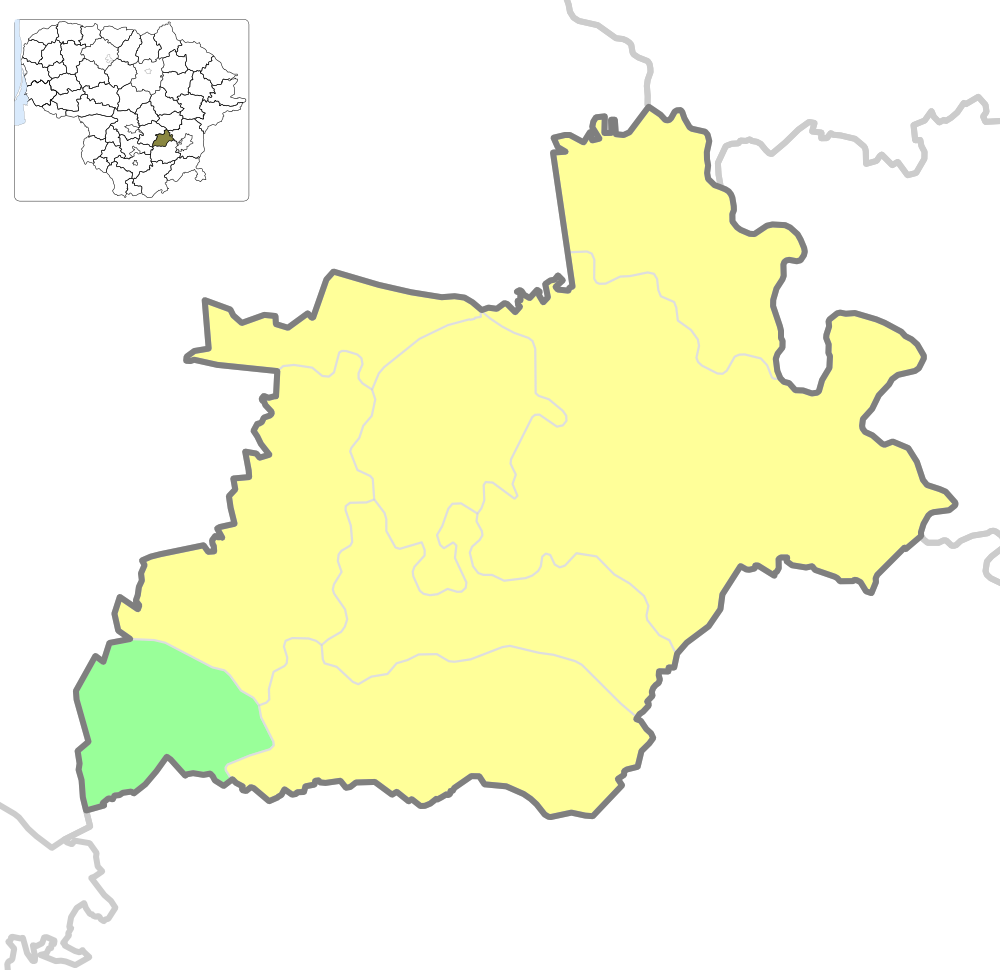
Location of Beižionys Eldership in Elektrėnai Municipality

The Beižionys Eldership (Lithuanian: Beižionių seniūnija) is an eldership of Lithuania, located in the Elektrėnai Municipality. In 2021 its population was 240.
