= Aryeh Leib Baron =

Russian-born Canadian Haredi rabbi and Talmudic scholar (1912-2011)

Rabbi Aryeh Leib Baron אריה לייב ברון
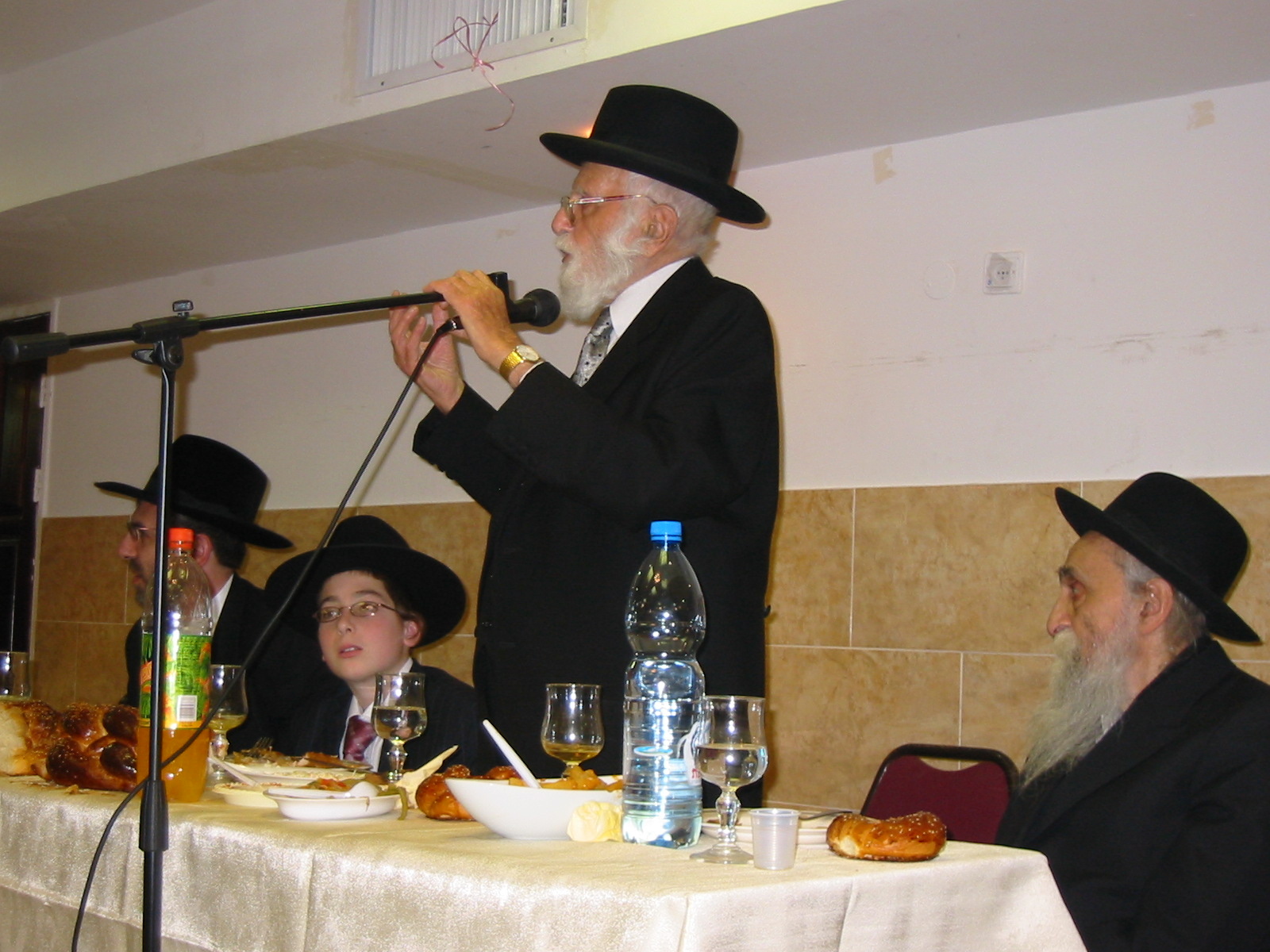
- with Rabbi Meshulam Dovid Soloveitchik

Personal life
- Born: March 2, 1912 Horodok, Minsk Region, Russian Empire
- Died: October 3, 2011 (aged 99)
- Buried: Har HaMenuchot
- Parent: Reuven (father)
- Education: Baranovich Yeshiva; Mir Yeshiva

Religious life
- Religion: Judaism

Jewish leader
- Position: Rabbi
- Synagogue: Beis Medrash Merkaz HaTalmud
- Yeshiva: Yeshiva Merkaz HaTorah; Beis Medrash Merkaz HaTalmud; Yeshiva Ahavas HaTorah Baranovich
- Yahrtzeit: ו' תשרי תשע"ב

Rabbi Aryeh Leib Baron (Hebrew: אריה לייב ברון; March 2, 1912 – October 3, 2011) was a Russian-born Canadian Haredi Jewish rabbi and rosh yeshiva (dean) of Yeshiva Merkaz HaTorah and the rabbi of Beis Medrash Merkaz HaTalmud in Montréal, Canada, as well as the founder of Yeshiva Ahavas Torah Baranovich in Jerusalem.

== Early life ==
Rabbi Aryeh Leib Baron was born on March 2, 1912, in the town of Horodok in the Minsk Region of Belarus, then part of the Russian Empire, to Reuven Baranovich (his last name, Baron, is a shortened version of "Baranovich"). His Hebrew birthday was on the Fast of Esther. In his youth, he studied under Rabbi Avraham Kalmanowitz in Rakov and later at a yeshiva in Stowbtsy, Belarus. As a younger man, he studied in the Baranovich Yeshiva under Rabbi Elchonon Wasserman and Rabbi David Rappoport. Wasserman used the notes that he took in shiur (class) to publish his sefer, Kovetz He'aros. In the early 1930s, Baron went to study in the Mir Yeshiva, where he stayed until the outbreak of World War II, when the yeshiva escaped to Vilnius. In 1940, with the aid of Chiune Sugihara, then-Japanese consul to Kaunas, the yeshiva fled from Nazi-occupied Europe to Kobe, in Japan, from where they were transferred to Shanghai, in China. After several years, much of the yeshiva immigrated to the United States, including Baron. He then married the daughter of Rabbi Chaim Eliezer Samson, rosh yeshiva of Yeshivas Chofetz Chaim in Baltimore.

== Rabbinic career ==
In 1948, Baron was appointed rosh yeshiva of Yeshiva Merkaz HaTorah in Montréal, replacing Rabbi Eliyahu Simcha Chazzan who had become rosh yeshiva of Torah Vodaath in New York City in 1945. He was rosh yeshiva for 24 years. In 1973, he founded Beis Medrash Merkaz HaTalmud which he led until his move to Israel. He also founded Yeshiva Ahavas HaTorah Baranovich in Jerusalem. Baron died on October 3, 2011, a few months after his hundredth birthday. He was buried on Har HaMenuchot in Jerusalem
