= Elchonon Wasserman =

Belarusian Orthodox rabbi and rosh yeshiva (1874–1941)

Rabbi Elchonon Wasserman
- אלחנן וסרמן
- Rosh yeshiva, Yeshiva Ohel Torah-Baranovich
- Born: Elchonon Bunim Wasserman; 1874; Biržai, Kovno Governorate, Russian Empire
- Died: 6 July 1941 (aged 66–67); Seventh Fort, Kaunas, Lithuania
- Education: Telshe yeshiva
- Occupation: Rabbi
- Spouse: Michla (née Atlas) Wasserman
- Children: Simcha, Naftoli, David

Rabbi Elchonon Bunim Wasserman (Hebrew: אלחנן בונים וסרמן; Lithuanian: Elchononas Vasermanas; 1874 – 6 July 1941) was a prominent rabbi and rosh yeshiva (dean) in prewar Europe. He was one of the closest students of Rabbi Yisrael Meir Kagan (the Chofetz Chaim) and a noted Talmid Chacham. In the interwar period, he served as rosh yeshiva of Yeshiva Ohel Torah-Baranovich. He was murdered during the Holocaust.

== Early life and education ==
Elchonon Bunim Wasserman was born in Biržai (Birz) in present-day Lithuania to Naftali Beinish, a shopkeeper and Sheina Rakhel. In 1890, the family moved to Bauska (Boisk) in present-day Latvia, and Wasserman, then 15 years old, studied in the Telshe Yeshiva in Telšiai (Telz) under Rav Eliezer Gordon and Rav Shimon Shkop. When Wasserman returned home during vacation, he participated in classes given by Rav Avraham Yitzchak Kook, who was appointed rabbi of Bauska in 1895. In the summer of 1897, Wasserman met Rav Chaim Soloveitchik at a health resort and "became deeply attached to him and his way of learning." He left Telz and traveled to Brest-Litovsk (Brisk) in present-day Belarus, where he learned under Rav Soloveitchik for two years, thereafter considering him his primary rebbe (teacher and mentor).

Wasserman was married in 1899 to Michla, the daughter of Meir Atlas, rabbi of Salantai (Salant). Wasserman lived in his father-in-law's house for many years and rejected offers of rabbinical posts (including a prestigious rabbinate in Moscow) being afforded the opportunity to learn Torah at home. He did however decide to teach, and together with Yoel Baranchik, he founded a mesivta (high school) in Mstislavl (known to Jews as Amtchislav) in 1903 and earned a reputation as an outstanding teacher. Prior to 1907, Reb Wasserman heard that another local rabbi wanted to head the mesivta in Amtshilov and he left to avoid an argument, returning to learn in his father-in-law's house. From 1907 to 1910, he studied in the Kollel Kodshim in the Raduń Yeshiva in Radun (Radin), headed by the Chofetz Chaim. While at the kollel, Rav Wasserman studied for eighteen hours a day with Rav Yosef Shlomo Kahaneman, who would later become the rosh yeshiva (dean) of the Ponevezh Yeshiva.

=== Rosh yeshiva ===
In 1910, with the encouragement of Rabbi Yisroel Meir Kagan, the Chofetz Chaim, Wasserman was appointed rosh yeshiva of the mesivta in Brest-Litovsk, leading its expansion until it was disbanded in 1914 with the outbreak of World War I. With its closing, Rav Wasserman returned to Rav Kagan in Radin. When the Eastern Front reached Radin, however, the yeshiva there was closed, and Rav Wasserman fled to Russia with the Chofetz Chaim.

In 1914, the yeshiva was exiled to Smilavichy, near Minsk, and Rav Wasserman was appointed its rosh yeshiva one year later when Rav Kagan decided to relocate to Siemiatycze (Semiatitch). Together with Rav Yitzchok Hirshowitz (son-in-law of Rav Eliezer Gordon from Telz Yeshiva), Wasserman was asked to keep Torah alive in Smilavichy.

In 1921, after the war, the Soviet government began permitting Torah scholars to leave Russia. R' Wasserman moved to Baranovichi, Second Polish Republic (now in Belarus), where he took the lead of Yeshiva Ohel Torah-Baranovich. The yeshiva grew under R' Wasserman's supervision, and soon had close to 300 students. Copies of notes taken from Rav Wasserman's Torah lectures were passed around many of the yeshivas in Europe, increasing his influence and fame over most of the Torah world. He was one of the leaders of the Agudath Israel movement and was regarded as the spiritual successor of the Chofetz Chaim.

=== Trip to America ===
Towards the end of 1937, Wasserman traveled to the United States for 17 months in order to raise money for the yeshiva. He visited dozens of cities and towns, and raised around $10,000. While there, he made an impression on many young Jews.

Wasserman returned to Poland. This was partly because he did not want to abandon his students, and partly because he took a dim view of American Jewry. In 1939, just before the Nazi invasion, he advised a student against accepting a visa to the United States if it meant studying at Yeshiva University and what is now the Hebrew Theological College, due to what he perceived as a spiritually dangerous atmosphere in these two institutions. He suggested instead that the student consider Yeshiva Torah Vodaas in Brooklyn, New York.

=== Death in the Holocaust ===
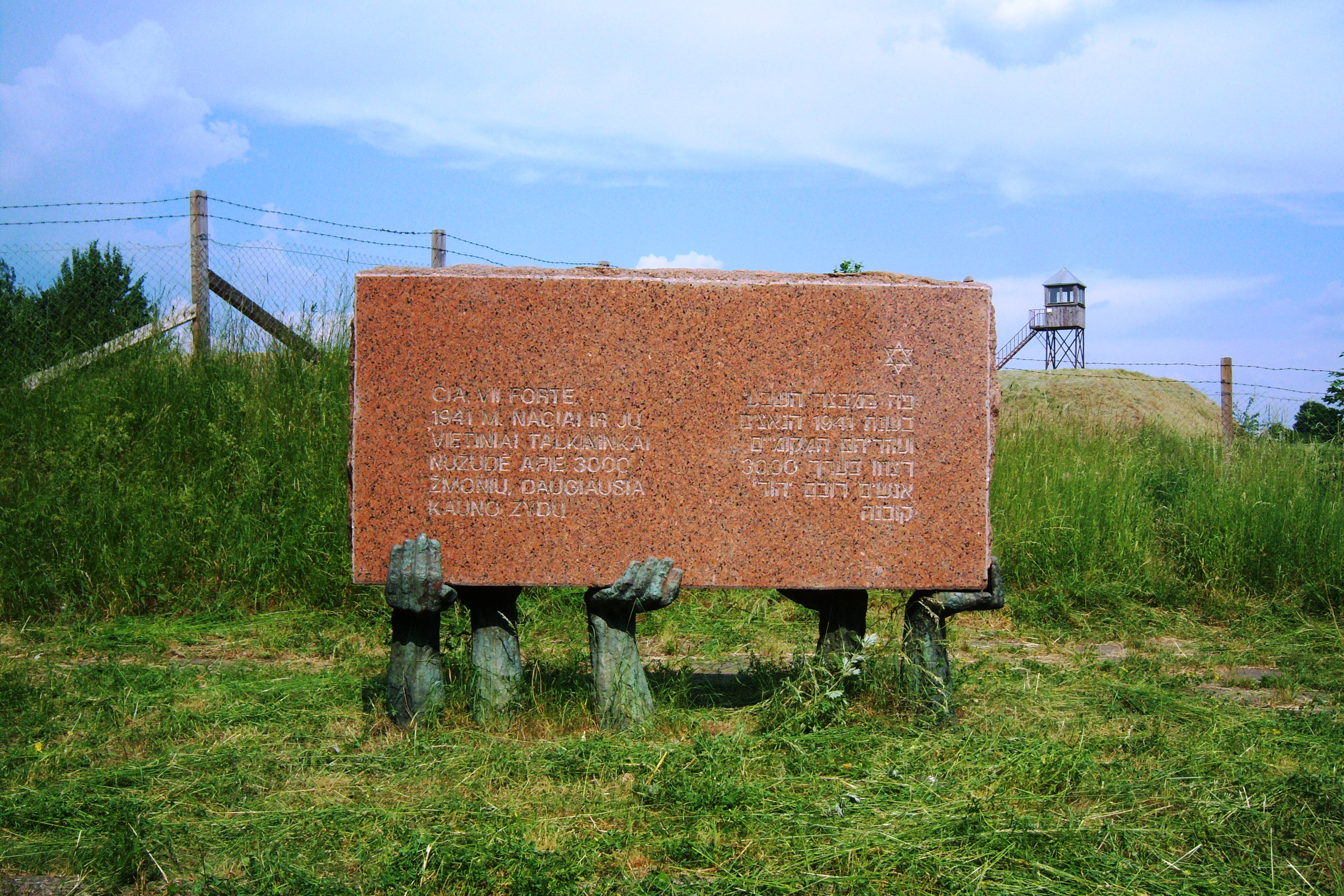
Monument to the victims of the massacre at the Seventh Fort (July 1941)

When World War II broke out, Reb Wasserman fled to Vilnius (Vilna). In 1941, while on a visit to Kaunas (Kovno), he was arrested by Lithuanian Nazi sympathizers with twelve other rabbis. Wasserman was taken and murdered by Lithuanian collaborators on the 11th of Tammuz, 1941, in the Seventh Fort of Kaunas Fortress. Before he was taken he gave this statement:

"In Heaven it appears that they deem us to be righteous because our bodies have been chosen to atone for the Jewish people. Therefore, we must repent now, immediately. There is not much time. We must keep in mind that we will be better offerings if we repent. In this way we will save the lives of our brethren overseas. Let no thought enter our minds, God forbid, which is abominable and which renders an offering unfit. We are now fulfilling the greatest mitzvah. With fire she [Jerusalem] was destroyed and with fire she will be rebuilt. The very fire which consumes our bodies will one day rebuild the Jewish people".

There was no monument, only a marker to the pit where, with others, he was shot.

== Family ==
Wasserman had several sons. Elazar Simcha (1899-1992), his oldest, served as dean of Yeshiva Beth Yehudah in Detroit in the 1940s, founded Yeshiva Ohr Elchonon (later renamed Yeshiva Ohr Elchonon Chabad/West Coast Talmudical Seminary) in Los Angeles, California, in the 1950s, and later founded Yeshiva Ohr Elchonon in Jerusalem. Wasserman's son David survived the Holocaust, remarried and relocated to Brooklyn. Rav Wasserman's other son, Naftoli, was murdered in the Holocaust.

== Anti-Zionism ==
Wasserman was an opponent of Zionism. He based his opinion upon the Torah views of his teachers, including Rabbis Kagan, Gordon, Shkop, and Soloveitchik. He considered all forms of Zionism to be heretical, even that of the religious Mizrachi party. He was opposed to the idea of a Jewish state because it constituted kefirah (rejection) of the coming of Moshiach (the Messiah). He held this position even in reference to a state run according to Torah law. He declared that any religious Jew who collaborated with the Zionists was causing others to sin. He rejected the notion that the creation of a state was a signal to the Atchalta De'Geulah (beginning of the Jewish redemption), considering it instead to be the beginning of a new galus (exile).

Even during the Holocaust, Reb Wasserman discouraged emigration to the United States or British-Mandate Palestine, viewing them as places of spiritual danger. He was particularity critical of the Zionist enterprise in Palestine and claimed, "Anti-Semites want to kill the body, but Zionists kill the soul. Better to die than consort with the Zionists."

Reb Wasserman viewed the two ascendant political movements of his time, nationalism and socialism, as "two forms of idolatry that had poisoned the hearts and minds of Jewish youth", and saw Nazism as an amalgam of both. He viewed the rise of the Nazi Party as a tool of God to exact punishment on the Jewish people for their pursuit of these foreign belief systems.

== Notable students ==
- Aryeh Leib Baron
- Shmuel Berenbaum
- Meyer Juzint
- Shneur Kotler
- Aryeh Leib Malin
- Nochum Partzovitz
- Dovid Povarsky
- Moshe Shmuel Shapiro
- Simcha Sheps
- Boruch Sorotzkin
- Simcha Wasserman

== Works ==
Wasserman was famous for his clear, penetrating Talmudic analysis. His popular works, essential material in yeshivas around the world, are unique in their approach. He would often quote his rebbe, Chaim Soloveitchik, saying "Producing chiddushim (novel Torah concepts) is not for us. That was only in the power of the Rishonim. Our task is to understand what it says." This approach is evident in his works, which include:

- Kovetz Heoros
- Kovetz Shiurim
- Kovetz Biyurim
- Kovetz Shemuos
- Kovetz Inyanim
- Kovetz Maamarim
- Ikvasa Demeshicha

Wasserman also published the responsa of the Rashba with annotations in 1932. His talmudic novellae appeared in the rabbinic journal Sha'arei Tzion (1929–1934) and in other publications.
