= Kazokiškės Eldership =

Eldership of Lithuania

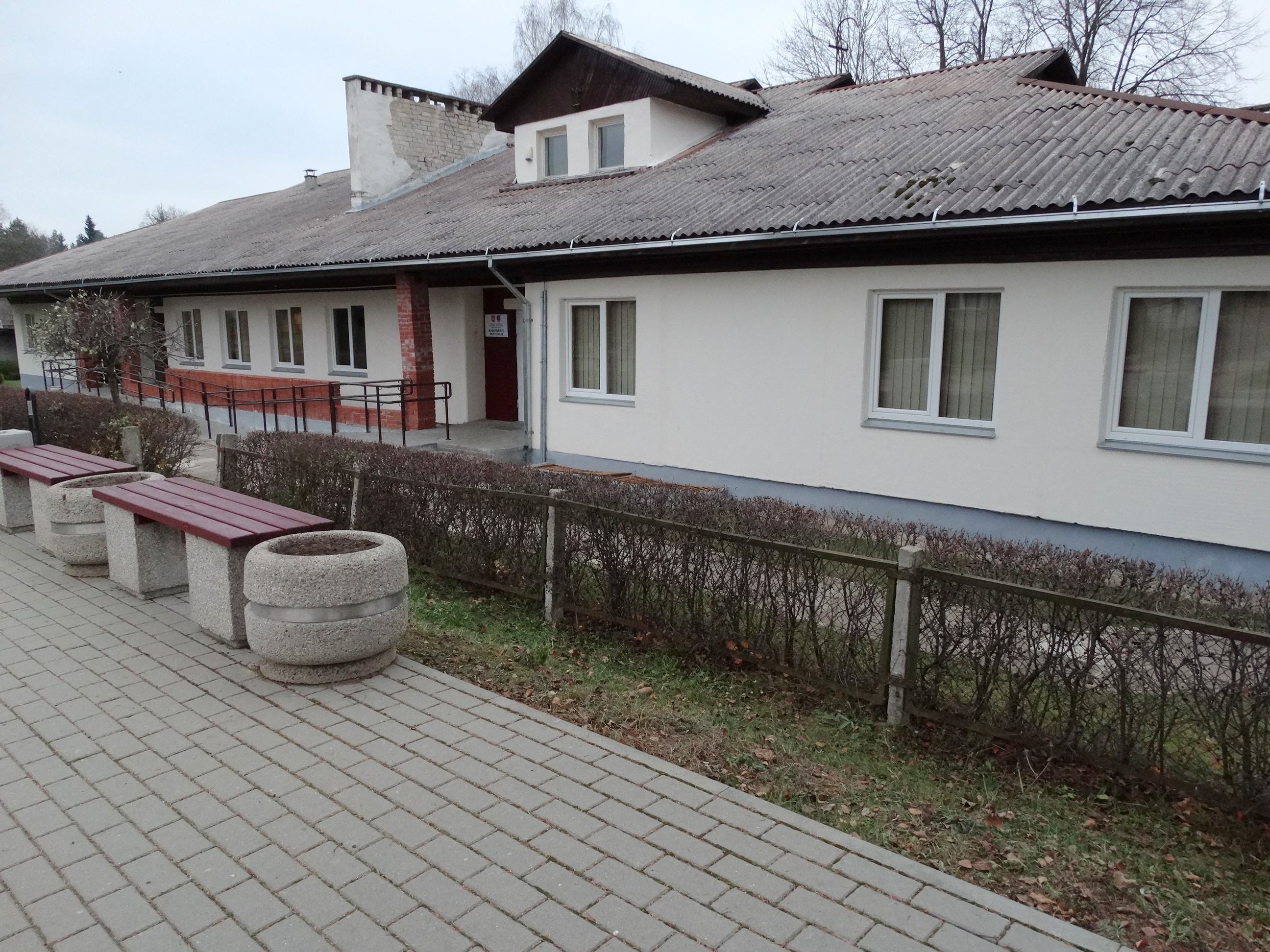
Eldership, Kazokiškės, Elektrėnai municipality, Lithuania

The Kazokiškės Eldership (Lithuanian: Kazokiškių seniūnija) is an eldership of Lithuania, located in the Elektrėnai Municipality. In 2021 its population was 391.
