= Issamar Ginzberg =

Marketing consultant

- איתמר גינזבערג
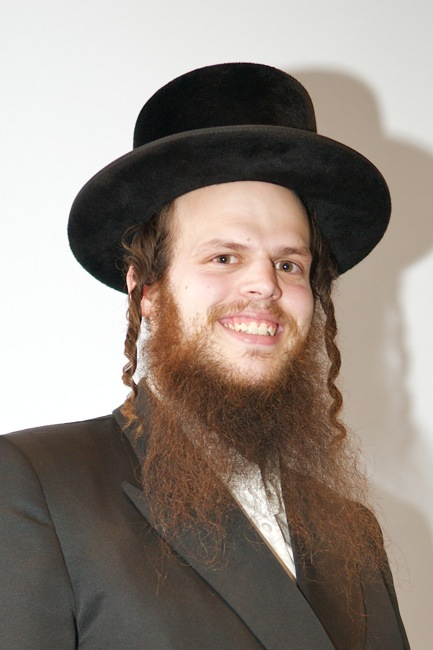
- Issamar Ginzberg
- Occupations: Business strategy and marketing consultant
- Organizations: CEO of Monetized Intellect Consulting; Founder of English Speaking Entrepreneurs Israel (ESEI); CEO of Fuss Brands Corp.

Issamar Ginzberg (Yiddish: איתמר גינזבערג) is a business strategy and marketing consultant. He is the founder and CEO of Monetized Intellect Consulting, a business and marketing firm with offices in New York City and Jerusalem. Ginzberg also founded English Speaking Entrepreneurs Israel (ESEI), an organization that assists English-speaking businessmen in adjusting to the Israeli business market.

Ginzberg, a rabbi, has conducted seminars on marketing in the U.S. and Israel.

He has a podcast on Yiddish24.com.

He is the CEO of Fuss Brands Corp.

He has written for The Jerusalem Post, Hamodia, and The English Update. He is the author of ''How Marketers Mess With Your... Marketing Secrets That Are Used to Get Your Attention... and How to Use Them to Your Advantage'' (2010) and ''Hey Entrepreneur! You Need to Read This Book, So Buy It Today!'' (2011). Ginzberg wrote the foreword to Everything You Need to Know About Buying Real Estate in Israel by Shia Getter.
