= St. Nicholas Church, Semeliškės =

Coordinates: 54°40′01″N 24°39′27″E

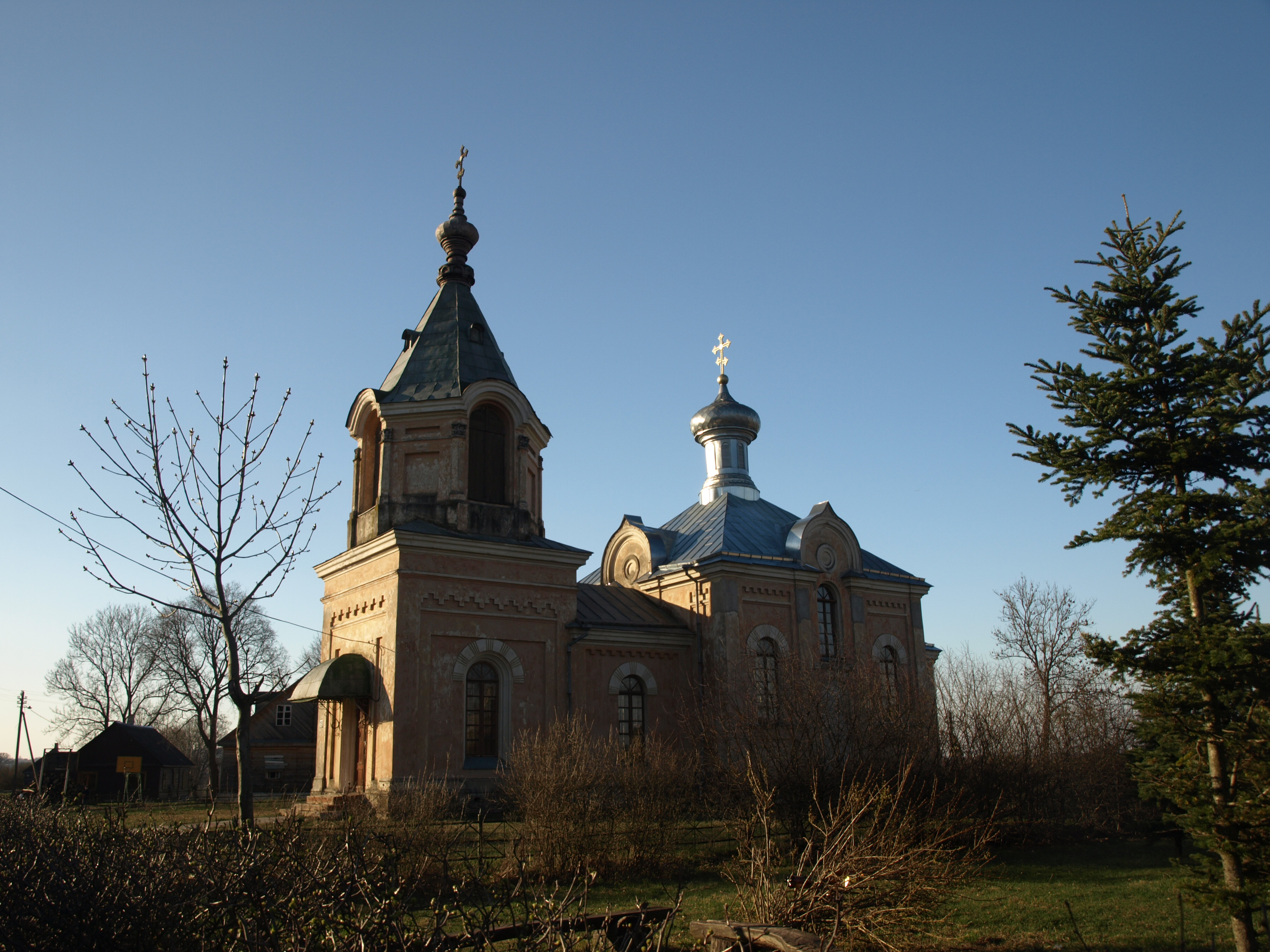
St. Nicholas Church

St. Nicholas Church is an Eastern Orthodox church in Semeliškės, Lithuania, built in 1895, belonging to the Russian Orthodox Diocese of Lithuania.

After the suppression of the January Uprising, the Tsarist government financed the construction of a dozen of Orthodox churches in Vilnius region, in order to stress the Russian rule in this land. The Orthodox peasants from the Semeliškės village asked the Vilnius Orthodox diocese to build a church in their village, too; but they got a negative response due to the small dimension of the village. However, after 1890 a nobleman from Trakai, Alexey Peiker, agreed to support financially the construction of an Orthodox church in Semeliškės. The church was ready in 1895. It was located next to the main village square, which was the most prestigious of the possible locations. The building was consecrated on March 16, 1896. At this moment, the Semeliškės Orthodox parish consisted of about 500 people. This number subsequently grew to 765 in 1909.

The church, like many others in Lithuania, was closed in 1915, when the parish priest was forced to join the Russian army as a chaplain. New Orthodox clergymen arrived in Semeliškės only in 1923, sent by the new Orthodox metropolitan of Vilnius, Elevferiy (Bogoyavlensky). The church stopped functioning again in 1939. After the war, the number of Orthodox Christians in Semeliškės started to fall gradually. Although the church was registered in a Soviet government in 1947 as an existing parish, it was closed again in 1954 due to the small number of parishioners. Up to today, the services are held in Semeliškės only during the major Orthodox festivals.

== In popular culture ==
St. Nicholas Church was used as the location for a Russian church in the fourth season of the Netflix series, Stranger Things.

== Sources ==
- G. Shlevis, Православные храмы Литвы, Свято-Духов Монастыр, Vilnius 2006, ISBN 9986-559-62-6
