= Gilučiai Eldership =

Eldership of Lithuania

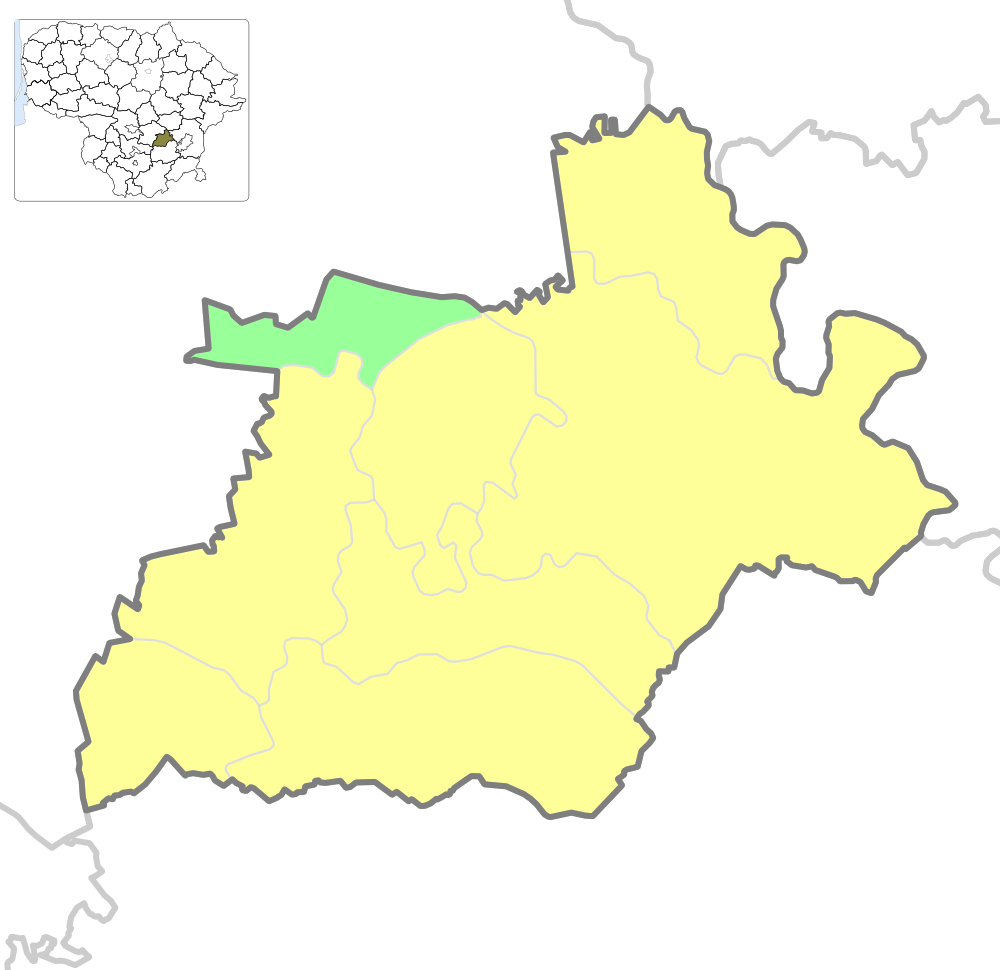

The Gilučiai Eldership (Lithuanian: Gilučių seniūnija) is an eldership of Lithuania, located in the Elektrėnai Municipality. In 2021 its population was 462.
