= Aharon Sorasky =

Israeli Haredi author and rabbi

- Born: אהרן סורסקי; April 28, 1940 (age 86)
- Occupation: Author
- Writing career
- Pen name: A. Safran
- Language: Hebrew
- Genres: Torah commentaries, biographies, non-fiction stories

Rabbi Aharon Sorasky (Hebrew: אהרן סורסקי; surname also spelled Surasky or Sorsky) is a Haredi author in Israel, his specialty being biographies about Orthodox rabbis. He has also written under the pseudonym A. Safran.

== Personal life ==
Rabbi Sorasky was born on April 28, 1940, and is a Slonimer chossid. He began his writing career with the Hamodia and worked for the Netzach publishing company. He has been hired by several Hasidic courts to write biographies about their rebbes.

== Praise ==
Rabbi Hanoch Teller wrote that "for decades, Rabbi Surasky has established himself as the most eminent, reliable and stylistically graceful biographer of our time–perhaps of all time." Rabbi Teller also praises him as a "serious talmid chacham and erudite scholar." Rabbi Simcha Wasserman praised him for his work, Ohr Elchonon, about Rabbi Wasserman's father, saying, "Rabbi Aharon Sorasky, the distinguished author and scholar, gathered and organized the material into a justly acclaimed Ohr Elchonon in Hebrew. Its accurate portrayal of my father's character, accoplishents, and teachings is an eloquent tribute to Rabbi Sorasky's understanding and skill." Rabbi Gedalia Anemer, rosh yeshiva of Yeshiva of Greater Washington, called Rabbi Sorasky's biography on Rabbi Yekusiel Yehuda Halberstam, Lapid HaEsh, "an exceptional work which portrays the life of the great tzadik and his many contributions to Klal Yisrael (the Jewish people)."

== Bibliography ==
=== Torah ===
- MeMaayanot HaNetzach: Machrozet Peninim LeParshat HaShavuah (5 volumes) commentary on the Weekly Torah portions
- MeMaayanot HaNetzach: Pirkei Avot, compilation of Acharonim's commentaries on Pirkei Avot
- MiSod Siach Chassidim: Derech Emunah Bacharti, 2006, on Hassidic faith in their Rebbes
- MiSod Siach Chassidim: VeAhavtah LeReachah KaMochah, 2015, sequel to MiSod Siach Chassidim: Derech Emunah Bacharti
- Achiezer, 1970, by Rabbi Chaim Ozer Grodzensky, arranged by Rabbi Sorasky

=== Hasidism ===
- Yesod HaMaalah, 1991, history of Hassidism in the Land of Israel
- Marbitzei Torah BiOlam HaChassidut, 1986, biographies on Hassidic rebbes
- Lapid HaEsh: Pirkei Chayav HaMufla'im Shel Mofet HaDor K"K ABDDK"K Tzanz-Klausenberg Ztzvk"l, 1996, 2 volume biography of Rabbi Yekusiel Yehudah Halberstam
  - later translated into English by Judah Lifschutz, under the names The Klausenburger Rebbe: The War Years and The Klausenburger Rebbe: Rebuilding
- Rosh Golat Ariel: Toldot Chayav U'Poalo Shel Rabbeinu Avraham Mordechai Alter MeGur, 1990, co-authored by Rabbi Avraham Mordechai Segal, 2 volume biography of Rabbi Avraham Mordechai Alter
- Pe'er Yisrael: Maran Admor HaRav Yisrael MiGur Zy"a Ha"Beis Yisrael", (1997), three volume biography of Rabbi Yisrael Alter
- VaYechi Yosef, 2 volume biography of Rabbi Yosef Greenwald
- BeLabat Esh, 1984, biography of Rabbi Moshe Yechiel Epstein
- Zecher Kedoshim: Matzevet Zikaron LeShtibel Shel Chasidei Slonim BiIr Lodz, Polin, on the Slonim community in Łódź
- Shoshelet Spinka, 1990, biogrophies of the Spinka rebbes
- Heichal Bobov, 1996, biographies of the Bobover rebbes
- Geonei Polin: Chayeihem VeToratam Shel Rabbi Menachem Ziemba MePraga, Rabbi Aryeh Tzvi Frumer MeKozhiglov, (1983) biogrophies of Polish rabbis
- Moreshet Tchebin: Darkei Chayav UPoalo Shel Rabbi Dov Berish Weidenfeld, (1987/1988) biography of Rabbi Dov Berish Weidenfeld
- Toldot Yehoshuah, on Rabbi Yehoshua Spira, Rebbe of Ribatitch and Bluzhev

=== Other ===
- Orot MiMizrach: Toldot Ro'im Ruchni'im LeYahadut HaSepharadit, 1974, biographies about Sephardic rabbis
- D'muyot Hod, 1967, three volume series on gedolim
- Toldot HaChinuch HaTorati BeTekufah HaChadashah, history of Haredi chinuch in the Land of Israel spanning 100 years
- Marbitzei Torah U'Mussar: BeYeshivot Nusach Lita MeTekufat Volozhin Ve'ad Yamenu, 1976, four volumes, biographies on Lithuanian Orthodox rabbis
- Rabbi Shimon VeTorato: Korot Chayav VeShitato HaTalmudit Shel Rabbi Shimon Yehudah HaKohen Shkop, 1971, biography of Rabbi Shimon Shkop
- Ohr Elchonon: Sipur Chayav Shel Rabbi Elchanan Bunim Wasserman, biography of Rabbi Elchonon Wasserman
  - later translated into English by Artscroll, under the name Reb Elchonon
- VeZot LeYehudah: Mesechet Chayav VePo'alav Shel Rabbeinu HaGadol Maran Rabbi Yehudah Tzadka Ztzvk"l, 2012, biography of Rabbi Yehuda Tzadka
- Rabbi Shimon Chassidah: Esh Yokedet, biography of Rabbi Shimon Sofer of Erlau
- Melech BeYofyo: Toldos Chayav, Po'alo VeDarko BeKodesh Shel Maran HaGaon Rabbi Yechezkel Abramsky Ztzvk"l, 2004, 2 volume biography of Rabbi Yechezkel Abramsky
- Chevlei Yotzer: Sipur Chayav UPoalo Shel Meyased Bnei-Brak Rabbi Yitzchak Gerstenkorn, 1974, biography of Rabbi Yitzchak Gerstenkorn, one of the founders and first mayor of Bnei Brak
- HaRav MiPonevezh: Toldot HaGaon HaGadol HaRav R' Yosef Shlomo Kahaneman zt"l, 1997, biography of Rabbi Yosef Shlomo Kahaneman
- HaChazon Ish BeDorotav: Toldot Rabbi Avraham Yeshaya Karelitz, 1983, on Rabbi Avraham Yeshaya Karelitz (the Chazon Ish)
- Shluchah DeRachmana: Pirkei Chaim VeYetzirah Shel Shraga Feivel Mendelowitz Zt"l, 1992, biography of Rabbi Shraga Feivel Mendelowitz
  - Later adapted into English by Yonasan Rosenblum under the name Reb Shraga Feivel: The Life and Times of Rabbi Shraga Feivel Mendlowitz, the Architect of Torah in America
- Zuto Shel Nahar: Sipurim Nevcharim, 1983, stories of Tzaddikim
- Esh HaTorah (two volumes), on Rabbi Aharon Kotler
