= Binah Magazine =

Jewish women's magazine in the United States

Binah
- Editor: Chavy Helfgott
- Frequency: Weekly
- Publisher: Nosson Raab
- Founded: 2006
- First issue: Elul 5766 (Fall 2006)
- Company: Binah Magazine Corporation
- Country: United States
- Based in: Brooklyn, New York
- Language: English
- Website: www.binahmagazine.com
- ISSN: 1752-2900
- OCLC: 77487511

Binah Magazine (Hebrew: בינה, lit. 'insight') is a Haredi Jewish women's magazine published weekly by Binah Magazine Corporation in the United States. Additional distribution takes place in the United Kingdom and Israel. Binah Magazine Corporation is a subsidiary of Hamodia Publishing Corporation. The magazine debuted in 2006.

Binah is known for its full-color, glossy pages and its coverage of topics not usually discussed in mainstream Orthodox Jewish publications, such as divorce, single-parenting, home budgeting, and medical conditions. Like other Orthodox publications, Binah does not publish photos of women.

A 2012 article on summer camp security led to a summer-camp inspection by New York Assemblyman Dov Hikind and New York State Senate hopeful Simcha Felder at Camp Agudah in upstate New York.
