= Yeshiva Beth Yehudah =

Jewish day school in Michigan, United States

Information
- School type: Jewish day school
- Established: 1914; 112 years ago
- Grades: 1-8 (boys); PreK-12 (girls)
- Gender: Girls and boys (taught separately)
- Enrollment: c.1000

Yeshiva Beth Yehudah is a religious Jewish day school consisting of two campuses at Southfield and Oak Park, Michigan, which serves boys (Southfield, grades 1–8) and girls (Oak Park, pre-K–12). The school's curriculum is a blend of traditional secular studies and religious studies. The school is a partner agency of the Jewish Federation of Metropolitan Detroit.

As of 2012, it is the largest Jewish primary and secondary day school in the Detroit area. The Yeshiva has a companion kollel with 30 postgraduate students.

== History ==
In August 1914, Rabbi Yehuda Leib Levin started the school as an afternoon Talmud Torah in the Mogen Avrohom Synagogue on Farnsworth Street, meeting five days a week. By 1923, the school, with 35 students, relocated to Beth Tefilo Emanuel Synagogue on Twelfth Street, and instituted a full-day school curriculum. In 1925, the school was renamed Yeshiva Beth Yehudah after Levin's death. The school moved several more times until 1940 when it occupied a new building on Dexter and Cortland. At this point, enrollment was at 162 students divided into six grade levels.

In 1943, the Beth Jacob School for Girls was established. Rabbi M. J. Wohlgelernter became Yeshiva Beth Yehudah's first president and Rabbi Simcha Wasserman was appointed Dean. Brothers Wolf and Isadore Cohen were founding members of the Yeshiva, with each of them taking a turn as president. In 1944, Rabbi A. A. Freedman moved to Detroit from New York City at the urging of the leader of the Torah Umesorah Day School movement, Rabbi Shraga Feivel Mendelowitz. Freedman became the inspiration and impetus for the growth of the yeshiva, actively recruiting new students.

Throughout the 1950s and 60s, the school flourished in Detroit, until it moved to its current location, on Lincoln Road in Southfield. Many educators became involved with the yeshiva, including Rabbi S. P. Wohlgelernter, who succeeded his brother as the school's President; Rabbi Leib Bakst, who served as Rosh Yeshiva until 1989; and Rabbi Sholom Goldstein, who was the principal of the Beth Jacob School for Girls from 1966 until his death in 1984.

In 1976, through the generosity of Norman Allan, Yeshiva Beth Yehudah purchased a building in Beverly Hills to house the Beth Jacob School for Girls. Around the same time, the Saltsman New Americans Program was launched in response to the influx of Russian immigrants to the community.

In 1991, Gary Torgow was elected President of the Yeshiva Beth Yehudah. Elected with him was Maury Ellenberg, chairman of the board.

Circa 1990 the school began leasing the former B’nai Moshe School for Girls site, which had been acquired by United Jewish Charities; the B'nai Moshe School relocated to West Bloomfield Township in that year. In late 1991, the Jewish Federation of Metropolitan Detroit agreed to purchase the B'nei Moshe Synagogue in Oak Park for the benefit of Yeshiva's girls' school. The Beth Jacob school moved to the newly renovated B'nei Moshe Synagogue in Oak Park directed and led by Rabbi Bunny Freedman, who was responsible for fundraising and coordination of the move.

In 1993, Freedman left the yeshiva and Rabbi Eli Mayerfeld was named Executive Director. He served for 22 years and oversaw the growth of Beth Yehudah from a 400-student day school (pre-K–12), to a full-service educational institution for more than 850 children and 2,500 adults of the broader Detroit Jewish community. A large portion of Mayerfeld's success is attributed to the great fundraising achievements of businessman Rabbi Binyomin Adler, who was hired in 2001 to propel the yeshiva's base.

In the eleven years after 1993, the Oak Park building underwent three expansions: the addition of the Abner Wolf High School wing, the Hannah Karbal educational wing, and the Meer Family Gymnasium.

In 1993, the boys' facility in Southfield was refurbished and expanded to include a new office complex and gymnasium. The building was renamed in honor of Milton and Lois Shiffman.

In 1994, Rabbi Avraham Cohen was appointed Dean of Yeshiva Beth Yehudah and Rabbi Nathaniel Lauer was named Educational Director of the Beth Jacob School for Girls.

In 1999, Cohen became Director of the Partners in Torah Adult Education Program and Rabbi Avrohom Fishman were appointed principal of the Boys' School and dean of Yeshiva Beth Yehudah. Also in 1999, the yeshiva broke ground on the Meer Early Childhood Center, a freestanding licensed daycare facility for the yeshiva's preschool classes. It served over 150 three-, four- and five-year-olds with a preschool program.

In 2010, after the death of Fishman, Rabbi Yitzchok Grossbard was named dean of the institution overseeing all divisions of the yeshiva and Beth Jacob. Rabbi Zev Poss was named principal of the Beth Jacob and Rabbi Aryeh Cohen was named Principal of the boys' division.

In 2012, Rabbi Bentzy Schechter was named director of Partners Detroit overseeing the chavrusa learning program and hundreds of other activities.

The school began construction on a girls' K–8 facility in Oak Park in the former B'nai Moshe site in 2018.

== Operations ==
Yeshiva Beth Yehudah is the largest Jewish School system in Michigan, with over 1,000 students. The school includes the Norma Jean & Edward Meer Early Childhood Development Center next to the boys' school.

The yeshiva is known locally for its annual fund-raising dinner, held at the Detroit Renaissance Center, which usually features a guest speaker. Previous guests include President George W. Bush, First Lady Laura Bush, President Joe Biden, Governor Jeb Bush, Secretary of State Hillary Clinton, Secretary of State Condoleezza Rice, Secretary of the Treasury Robert Rubin, New York Governor Andrew Cuomo, New York Mayor Rudy Giuliani, Republican Presidential nominee John McCain, Secretary of State John Kerry, and George Stephanopoulos. Political figures who have attended the dinner include previous governor Jennifer Granholm, Governor Rick Snyder, the previous Michigan Attorney General Mike Cox, Attorney General Bill Schuette, Senator Debbie Stabenow, Senator Carl Levin, and Senator Gary Peters.

Yeshiva Beth Yehudah Annual Dinner — Guest Speakers, 2000–2025

Year	Guest Speaker	Position at the time	Also known for
2000	Andrew Cuomo	U.S. Secretary of Housing and Urban Development	Son of Gov. Mario Cuomo; later Governor of New York
2001	Chuck Schumer	U.S. Senator, New York	Later Senate Majority Leader
2002	John Edwards	U.S. Senator, North Carolina	Later the 2004 Democratic vice presidential nominee
2003	Hillary Clinton	U.S. Senator, New York	Former First Lady; later U.S. Secretary of State
2004	Condoleezza Rice	National Security Advisor	Later Secretary of State
2005	John Kerry	U.S. Senator, Massachusetts	2004 Democratic presidential nominee; later Secretary of State
2006	John McCain	U.S. Senator, Arizona	Former U.S. Navy captain and prisoner of war
2008	Evan Bayh	U.S. Senator, Indiana	Former Governor of Indiana
2009	Janet Napolitano	Secretary of Homeland Security	Former Governor of Arizona
2010	Jeb Bush	Former Governor of Florida	Son and brother of presidents
2011	Joe Biden	Vice President of the United States	46th President of the United States
2012	Laura Bush	Former First Lady of the United States	Former teacher and librarian
2013	Rahm Emanuel	Mayor of Chicago	Former White House Chief of Staff
2014	George W. Bush	Former President of the United States	Former Governor of Texas
2015	Ben Cardin	U.S. Senator, Maryland	—
2016	Colin Powell	Former U.S. Secretary of State	Former Chairman of the Joint Chiefs of Staff
2017	Cory Booker	U.S. Senator, New Jersey	Former Mayor of Newark
2018	Tony Blair	Former Prime Minister of the United Kingdom	—
2019	Nikki Haley	Former U.S. Ambassador to the United Nations	Former Governor of South Carolina
2020	COVID, no dinner. Instead there was a live video event featuring addresses by then presidential candidates Joe Biden and Donald Trump.		
2021	Jill Biden	First Lady of the United States	—
2022	Ron Klain	White House Chief of Staff	Former Chief of Staff to Vice President Biden
2023	Josh Shapiro	Governor of Pennsylvania	Former Pennsylvania Attorney General
2024	Boris Johnson	Former Prime Minister of the United Kingdom	Former Mayor of London
2025	Andy Beshear	Governor of Kentucky	Former Attorney General of Kentucky
