= Hamodia =

Hebrew-language daily newspaper based in Jerusalem for a Haredi readership

- Front page of Hebrew Hamodia daily
- Type: Daily newspaper
- Format: Broadsheet
- Publisher: Ruth Lichtenstein
- Founded: 1950
- Political alignment: Haredi Judaism
- Language: Hebrew
- Headquarters: Brooklyn, New York
- Country: United States, Israel
- Website: hamodia.com

Hamodia (Hebrew: הַמּוֹדִיעַ, lit. 'The Informer') is a Jewish daily newspaper, published in Hebrew-language in Jerusalem and English-language in the United States, as well as weekly English-language editions in England and Israel. A weekly edition for French-speaking readers debuted in 2008. The newspaper's slogan is "The Newspaper of Torah Jewry". It comes with two magazines, Inyan and Insight. Haaretz, the newspaper of Israel's secular left, describes Hamodia as one of the "most powerful" newspapers in the Haredi community.

== History ==
Hamodia was founded in 1950 by Rabbi Yehuda Leib Levin, son of the Agudat Israel leader Rabbi Yitzhak-Meir Levin of Warsaw and Jerusalem.

Its current director general is Rabbi Chaim Moshe Knopf, and its deputy director general is Knopf's son, Rabbi Elazar Knopf.

== English-language edition ==
The English-language edition of Hamodia is published by Levin's daughter, Ruth Lichtenstein. It was first printed on 27 February 1998 as a weekly paper, and on 15 December 2003 it expanded to include a daily publication as well. The daily edition is published from Monday to Friday, with no edition appearing on Saturday (the Jewish Sabbath), Sunday, or the week of Passover, or the week of Sukkot. The weekly edition is printed on Wednesdays, and includes expanded sections and two glossy magazines: Inyan and Insight. The English-language Hamodia is published in four editions: United States (daily and weekly), Israel (weekly only), Australia (weekly only), and Britain (weekly only). The daily edition of the American Hamodia is also available in a digital online edition, which is updated throughout the day. The American version is the first Haredi Jewish daily newspaper ever published in English in the U.S. The newspaper has a website plus print circulation of 160,000.

== Editorial policy ==
Its editorial policy reflects the Haredi point of view. Although not Zionist, on ideological grounds, it is right of center in its Israeli coverage. It is outspoken on the status of Jerusalem, and opposes even minimal concessions from Israel. It includes editorials on all sides of American political and economic issues.

The publication prohibits photographs of women on its pages and website. It avoids sensationalism and reveling in tragedies. As Haredi culture shuns television, internet usage, and the reading of secular newspapers, Hamodia is one of the few news sources available to many of its readers. At first, the publishers refused to produce an internet edition of Hamodia, but it now exists.

== Notable journalists and writers ==
- Dovid Kaplan, chinuch (Jewish education) columnist
- Issamar Ginzberg
- Tziporah Heller, columnist
- Abraham J. Twerski

== See also ==
- List of Israeli newspapers
- Binah magazine
