= Moshe Shmuel Shapiro =

Israeli Rosh Yeshiva

Rabbi Rabbi Moshe Shmuel Shapiro
- משה שמואל שפירא
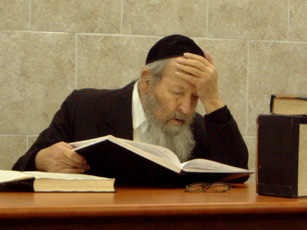
- Rabbi Moshe Shmuel Shapiro in 2003

Chief Rabbi of Ramle, Israel

Personal details
- Born: 1917 Minsk, Belarus
- Died: 2006 (aged 88–89)
- Education: Yeshivas Mir
- Occupation: Rosh Yeshiva, rabbi
- Known for: Kuntres Ha-Biurim, Sha'arei Shemu'os, Zahav MiShva

Rabbi Moshe Shmuel Shapiro (Hebrew: משה שמואל שפירא; 1917–2006) was a rosh yeshiva (dean of a Jewish seminary).

== Early life and education ==
Shapiro was born in the Minsk, Belarus. In 1937 he moved to Mandatory Palestine.

== In Israel ==
In Israel, Shapiro attended Yeshivas Lomza in Petah Tikva and was granted semikhah (ordained as a rabbi). He married in 1946.

== Works ==
Rabbi Shapiro with Rabbi Berel Soloveitchik.

- Kuntres Ha-Biurim, an in-depth analysis of various Talmudic topics.
- Sha'arei Shemu'os, a compilation of Shapiro's novellae arranged by folio of the Talmudic tractates on which he commented.

== Sources ==
- British Jewry Anticipates Visit Of Harav Moshe Shmuel Shapira
- HaRav Moshe Shmuel Shapira zt'l
