= Yeshiva Ohr Elchonon (Jerusalem) =

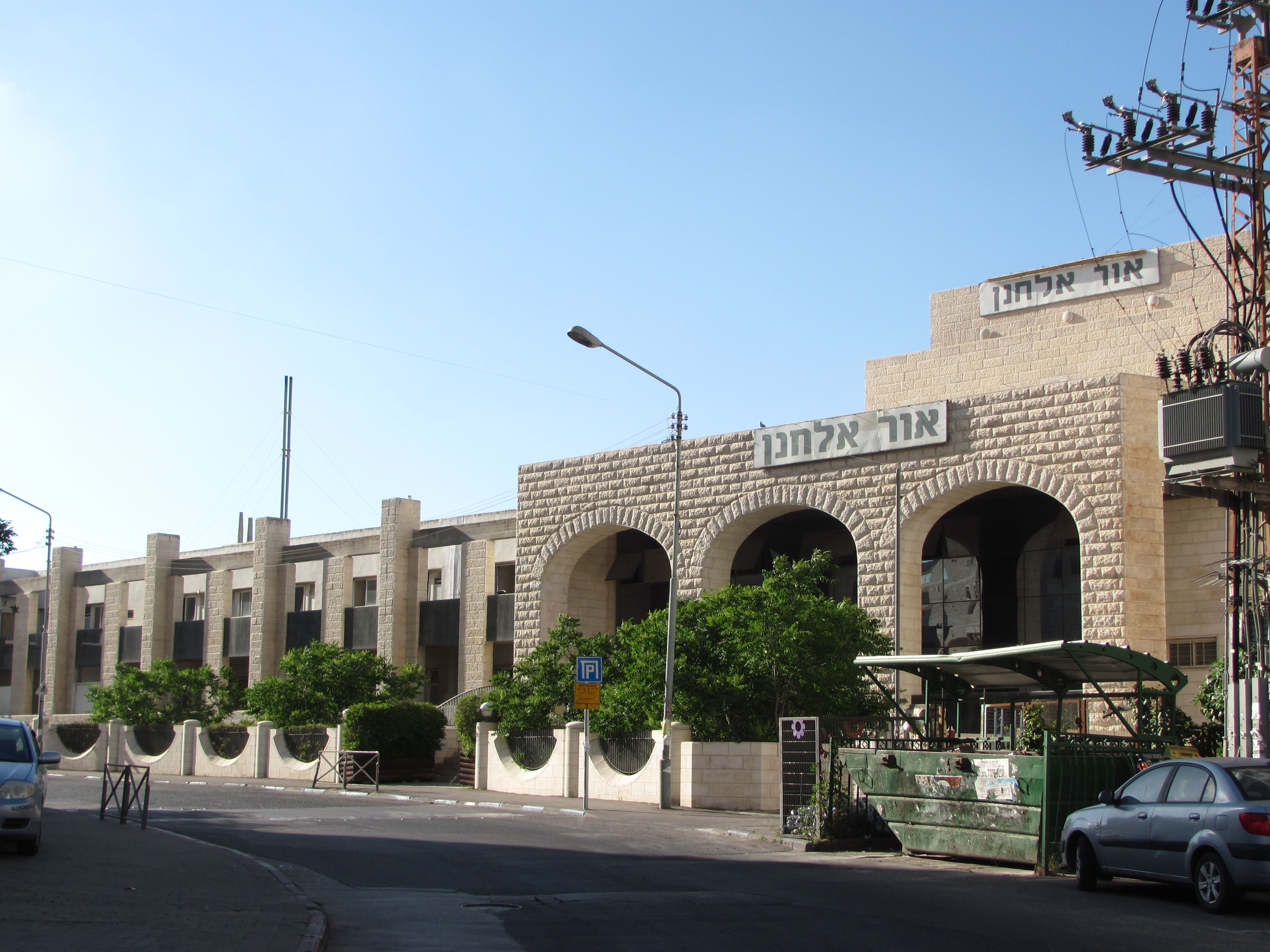

Location
- 27 Oholiav Street, Jerusalem
- 31.79375°N 35.20472°E

Information
- Type: Yeshiva ketana, yeshiva gedola
- Established: 1953
- Founder and Dean: Rabbi Simcha Wasserman
- Rosh yeshiva: Rabbi Moshe Chodosh

Yeshiva Ohr Elchonon (Hebrew: ישיבה אור אלחנן, also spelled Ohr Elchanan) is a Lithuanian-style Orthodox yeshiva in Jerusalem. The yeshiva was initially established in 1953 in Los Angeles, California, by Rabbi Simcha Wasserman, who named it in memory of his father, Rabbi Elchonon Wasserman, rosh yeshiva in Baranowicz, who was murdered in the Holocaust in Lithuania. The yeshiva operated in Los Angeles from 1953 to 1977, when it was sold to the Chabad movement. After Wasserman immigrated to Jerusalem, he established another Yeshiva Ohr Elchonon in the Ezrat Torah neighborhood in 1979. A second branch was opened in the Romema neighborhood in 1993. Ohr Elchonon enrolls hundreds of boys in yeshiva ketana and yeshiva gedolah, and close to 100 married men in its kollel. Additional yeshiva ketana branches have been established in the Israeli cities of Modiin Illit, Rishon Letzion, and Tiberias.

== History ==
Yeshiva Ohr Elchonon of Jerusalem is the fourth yeshiva founded by Rabbi Simcha Wasserman (1899–1992), who previously established seminaries in Strasbourg, France, Detroit, Michigan, and Los Angeles, California. Wasserman named his Los Angeles yeshiva "Ohr Elchonon" after his father, Rabbi Elchonon Wasserman, a prominent Talmudic scholar and leader of the World Agudath Israel in prewar Europe. Also called the West Coast Talmudical Seminary, Yeshiva Ohr Elchonon, opened in 1953, was the first Lithuanian-style yeshiva in Los Angeles. It provided cheder, yeshiva, beit midrash, and post-graduate education in addition to secular studies, enrolling 300 students at its peak. Its notable alumni include Rabbi Noach Orlowek, who entered the yeshiva at age 13. In 1977 Wasserman sold the yeshiva to Chabad on the condition that it would retain both the name and the building, which became known as Yeshiva Ohr Elchonon Chabad/West Coast Talmudical Seminary.

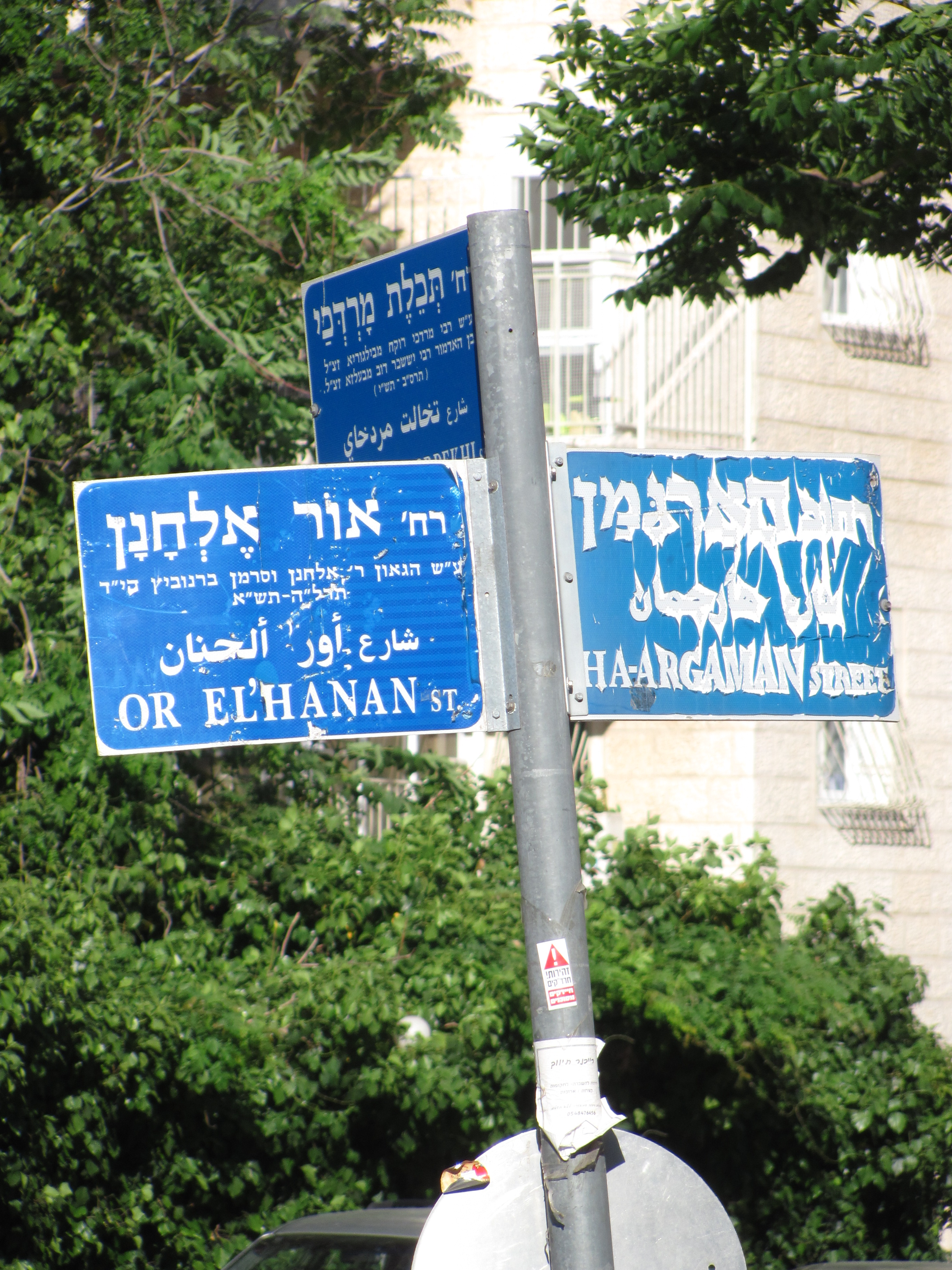
Ohr Elchonon Street sign

Wasserman and his wife immigrated to Israel in 1976. Together with Rabbi Meir Chodosh, mashgiach ruchani at the Hebron Yeshiva, Wasserman established another Yeshiva Ohr Elchonon in the Ezrat Torah neighborhood of Jerusalem in 1979. Wasserman asked Chodosh to serve as mashgiach ruchani of the new yeshiva and Chodosh's son, Rabbi Moshe Chodosh, to serve as rosh yeshiva. At the end of the 1980s, Wasserman embarked on an overseas fund-raising campaign for a new building, which was erected in the Romema neighborhood in 1993. After Wasserman's death, Chodosh continued as rosh yeshiva and later opened additional yeshiva ketana branches of Ohr Elchonon in the Israeli cities of Modiin Illit, Rishon Letzion, and Tiberias, with Chodosh serving as rosh yeshiva of all three branches as well. The yeshiva also operates the "Ohel Torah Baranowitz" institute, which compiles and publishes the works of Rabbi Elchonon Wasserman.

In 2012 the Jerusalem municipality renamed the segment of Oholiav Street in Romema on which the yeshiva is located as Rechov Ohr Elchonon (Ohr El'hanan Street), in tribute to Rabbi Elchonon Wasserman.

== Leadership ==
- Rabbi Simcha Wasserman (1899–1992), dean
- Rabbi Moshe Mordechai Chodosh (1940–2016), rosh yeshiva

== Sources ==
- Finkelman, Shimon (2005). Five Great Leaders. Mesorah Publications. ISBN 1422600238.
- Living the Parashah: Bereishis. Mesorah Publications. 2007. ISBN 978-1422601341.
- Krohn, Paysach (2002). Reflections of the Maggid: Inspirational Stories from Around the Globe and Around the Corner. Mesorah Publications. ISBN 1578197511.
- Orlowek, Rabbi Noach (1993). My Child, My Disciple. Feldheim Publishers. ISBN 0873066464.
- Tavory, Iddo (2016). Summoned: Identification and Religious Life in a Jewish Neighborhood. University of Chicago Press. p. 32. ISBN 978-0226322056.
- Ury, Rabbi Zalman F. (2001). "Slobodka, Baranowicz and Los Angeles Blend in Yeshiva Ohr Elchanan in Jerusalem" (PDF). Kedushat Avraham: Selected Essays.
