= Elektrėnai Municipality =

Elektrėnai Municipality Elektrėnų savivaldybė
- District Municipality
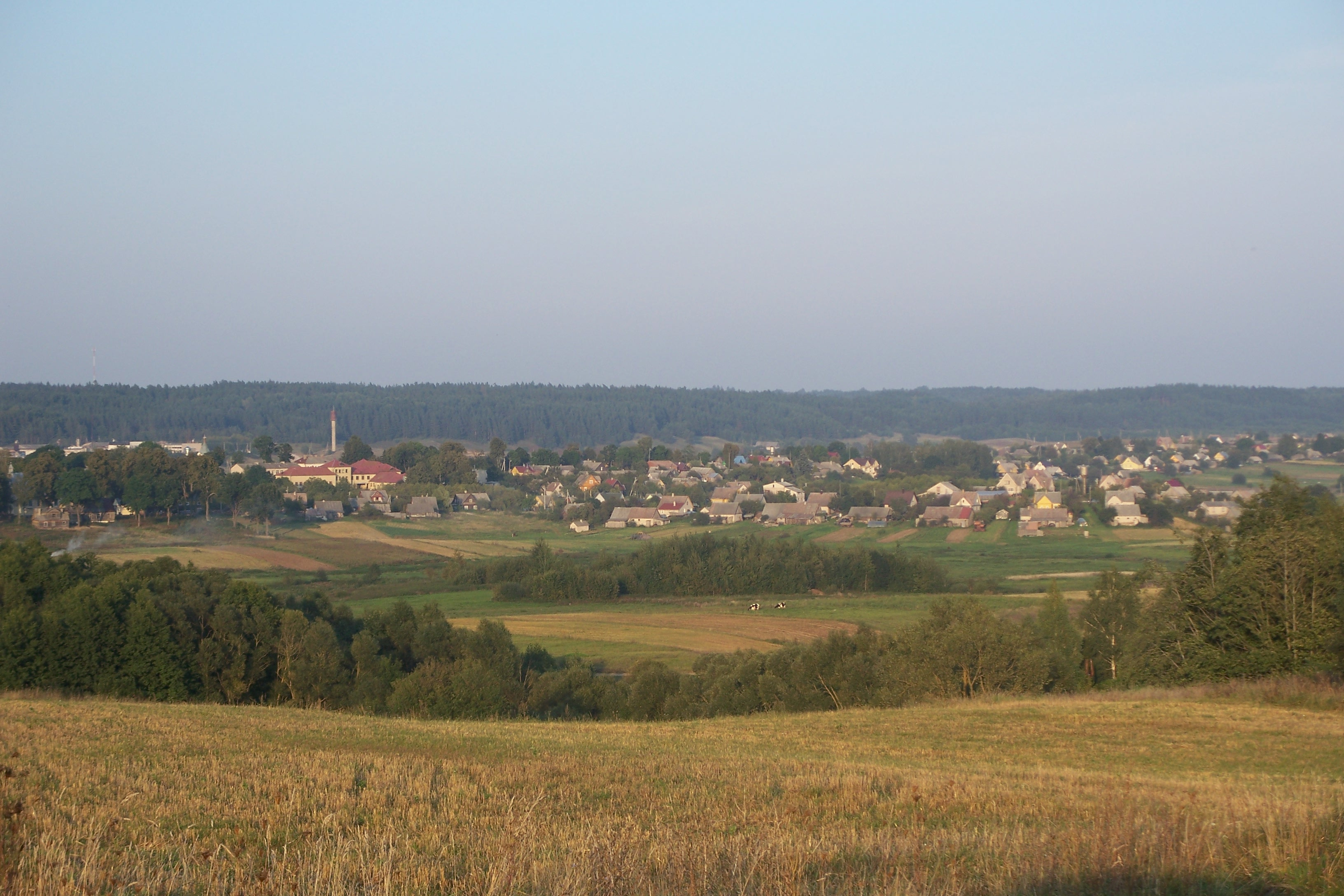
- Landscape near Semeliškės

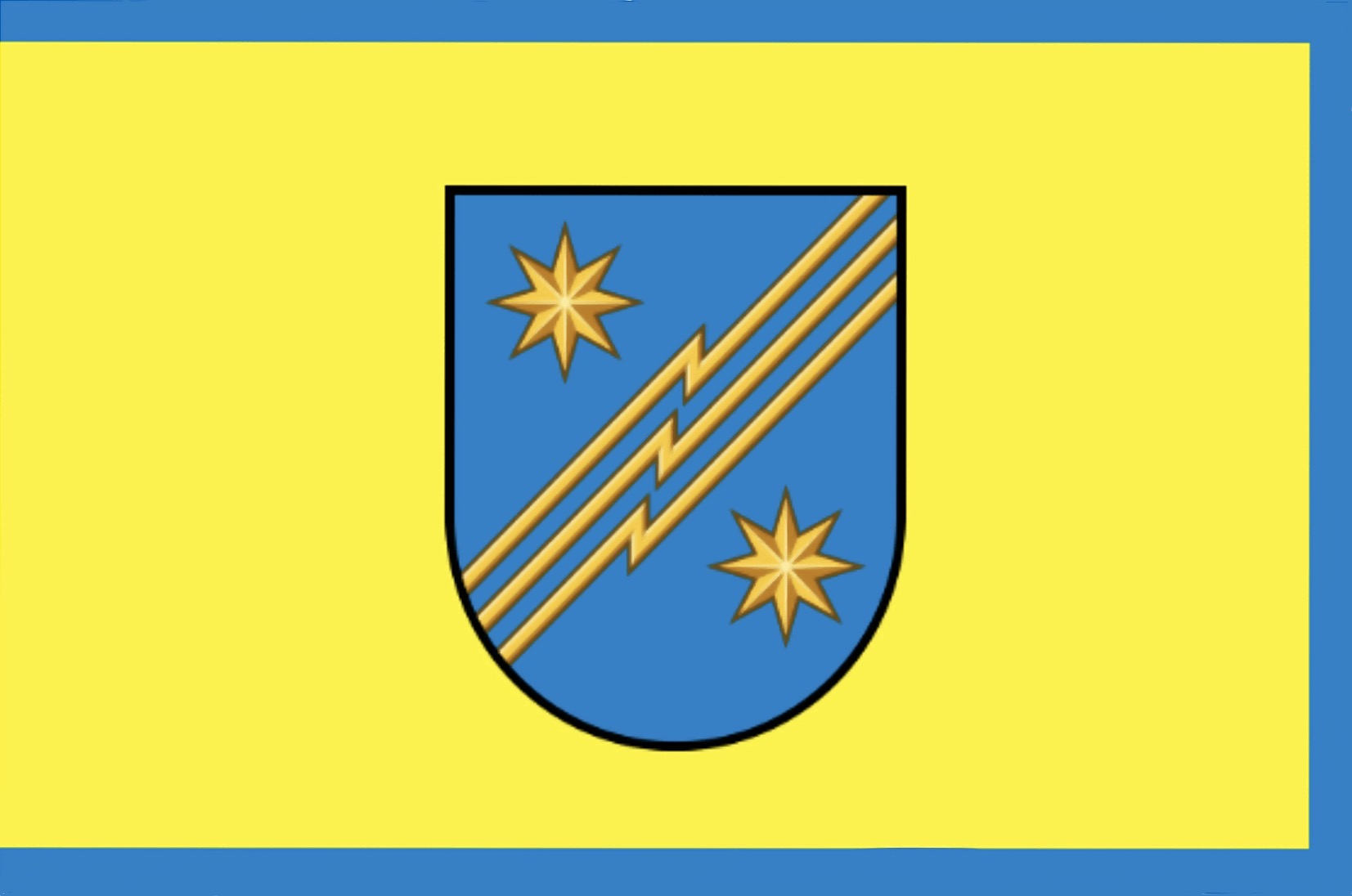
- Flag Coat of arms

- Location of Elektrėnai Municipality within Lithuania

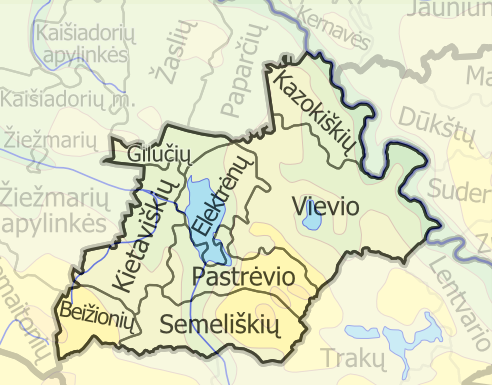
- Location of Elektrėnai
- Coordinates: 54°45′N 24°43′E
- Country: Lithuania
- Region: Dzūkija
- County: Vilnius County
- Established: 2000 (26 years ago)
- Capital: Elektrėnai
- Elderships: 8

Government
  - Type: City Council
  - Body: Elektrėnai Municipal Council
  - Mayor: Gediminas Ratkevičius

Area
  - Total: 509 km^{2} (197 sq mi)
  - Rank: 48th

Population (2022)
  - Total: 23,876
  - Rank: 35th
  - Density: 46.91/km^{2} (121.5/sq mi)
  - Rank: 11th
- Time zone: UTC+2 (EET)
  - Summer (DST): UTC+3 (EEST)
- ZIP Codes: 21300–26141
- Phone code: +370 (528)
- Website: www.elektrenai.lt

Elektrėnai Municipality is a municipality in Vilnius County, Lithuania.

== Elderships ==
Elektrėnai Municipality is divided into 8 elderships (seniunijas):

| Eldership | Area | Population (2021) | Population density (per km²) |
|---|---|---|---|
| Beižionys Eldership | 51 km^{2} (12,602.37 acres; 19.69 sq mi) | 240 | 5 |
| Elektrėnai Eldership | 40 km^{2} (9,884.22 acres; 15.44 sq mi) | 12,243 | 306 |
| Gilučiai Eldership | 25 km^{2} (6,177.63 acres; 9.65 sq mi) | 462 | 18 |
| Kazokiškės Eldership | 62 km^{2} (15,320.53 acres; 23.94 sq mi) | 391 | 6 |
| Kietaviškės Eldership | 56 km^{2} (13,837.90 acres; 21.62 sq mi) | 1,257 | 22 |
| Pastrėvys Eldership | 56 km^{2} (13,837.90 acres; 21.62 sq mi) | 641 | 11 |
| Semeliškės Eldership | 67 km^{2} (16,556.06 acres; 25.87 sq mi) | 1,024 | 15 |
| Vievis Eldership | 152 km^{2} (37,560.02 acres; 58.69 sq mi) | 7,118 | 47 |

== Demographics ==
According to the 2021 Lithuanian census, the municipality population was 23,376 people, of which:

- Lithuanians – 84.06% (19,651)
- Poles – 6.72% (1,572)
- Russians – 4.97% (1,163)
- Belarusians – 1.00% (235)
- Ukrainians – 0.76% (178)
- Others / did not specify – 2.47% (578)
