= Semeliškės =

- Town
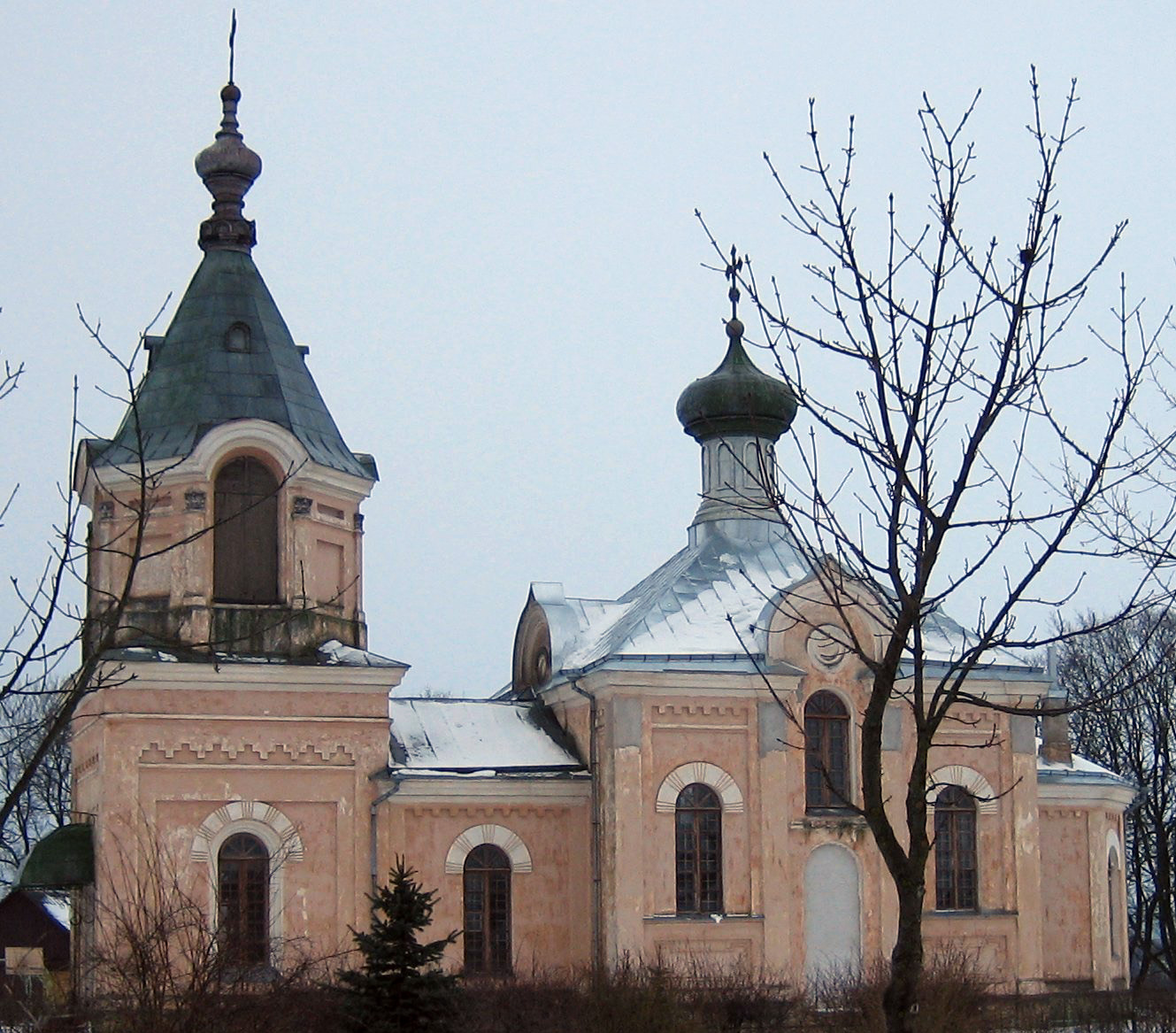

- Flag Coat of arms

- Location of Semeliškės in Lithuania
- Coordinates: 54°40′08″N 24°39′22″E
- Country: Lithuania
- County: Vilnius County
- Municipality: Elektrėnai municipality
- Eldership: Semeliškės eldership

Population (2021)
  - Total: 516
- Time zone: UTC+2 (EET)
  - Summer (DST): UTC+3 (EEST)

Semeliškės is a town in Elektrėnai municipality, Vilnius County, east Lithuania. According to the Lithuanian census of 2011, the town has a population of 580 people. The town has a church of Catholics and Orthodox church of St. Nicolas.

Its alternate names include Sameliškės, Semelishkes, Semelishkis, Semeliškių, Sumelishki, Sumilishki, Siemieliszki, and Sumiliszk.

== History ==
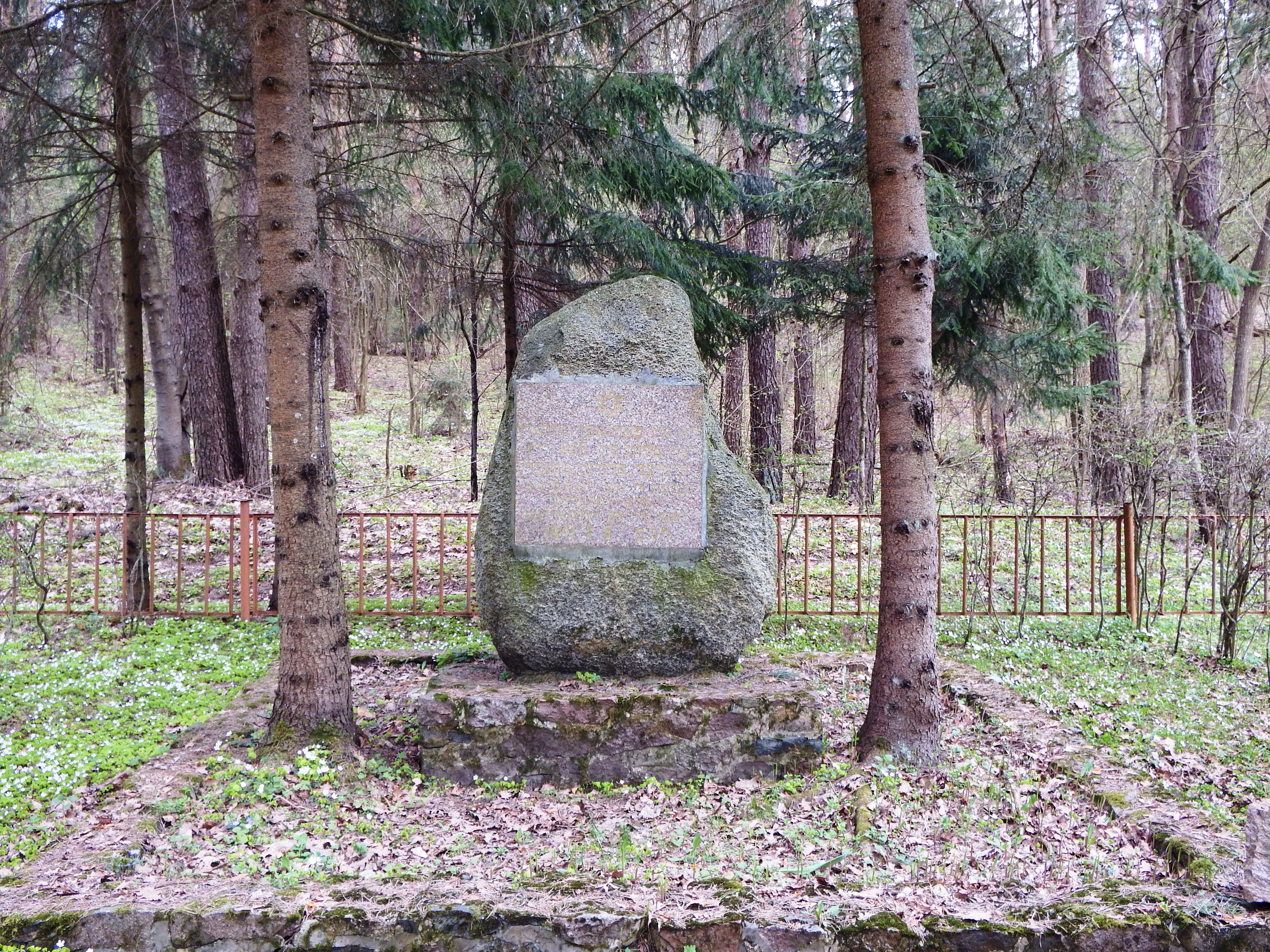
Memorial at the execution site of the Jews of the town.

On October 6, 1941, 962 Jews of the town were murdered in a mass execution perpetrated by an Einsatzgruppen of local policemen and their collaborators.
