= Yeshiva Ohr Elchonon Chabad West Coast Talmudical Seminary =

School in Los Angeles, California

Coordinates: 34.085442°N 118.346571°W

- Type: Chabad-Lubavitch Hasidic yeshiva
- Established: 1977
- Affiliations: Association of Advanced Rabbinical and Talmudic Schools, Tomchei Temimim
- Religious affiliation: Orthodox Judaism
- Academic staff: Rabbi Ezra Schochet, Dean
- Location: Los Angeles, California, United States
- Campus: Urban
- Website: www.yoec.edu

Yeshiva Ohr Elchonon Chabad West Coast Talmudical Seminary (YOEC) is a yeshiva college in Los Angeles, California. It is the largest yeshiva college on the West Coast of the United States.

The yeshiva also houses a private boys high school accredited by the Western Association of Schools and Colleges, called Yeshiva Ohr Elchonon Chabad High School.

The seminary is affiliated with the Chabad-Lubavitch Hasidic movement. The seminary's four-year Bachelor of Liberal Arts and Rabbinical Studies is accredited by the Association of Advanced Rabbinical and Talmudic Schools, recognized by the Council for Higher Education Accreditation The degree has a strong emphasis of Philosophy, Jewish Law, Talmudic analytics, Ethics, and Rabbinic literature.

Rabbi Ezra Schochet, scholar and Talmudist, has held the position of dean since the yeshiva's founding in 1977.

In 2003 the yeshiva underwent a $5 million renovation, adding 35,000 square feet (3,300 m^{2}) of space for dormitories, study rooms, and study hall.

The Yeshiva also prints periodically a Sefer pilpulim, a collection of the students original Torah thoughts and novellae, called kovetz Migdal Ohr.

== See also ==
- Yeshiva Ohr Elchonon (Jerusalem)
