= Kwiat =

Kwiat or Kviat may refer to:

- Kwiat (jeweler), American jewelry company (founded in 1907)
- Dovid Kviat (1920–2009), American rabbi
- Paul Kwiat, American physicist
- Sam Kwiat, founder of the Kwiat jewelry company
- Sandra Kviat, English female rabbi from Denmark

== See also ==
- Daniil Kvyat (born 1994), Russian racing driver
