= Sheikh Badr, Jerusalem =

Sheikh Badr شيخ بدر
- Village
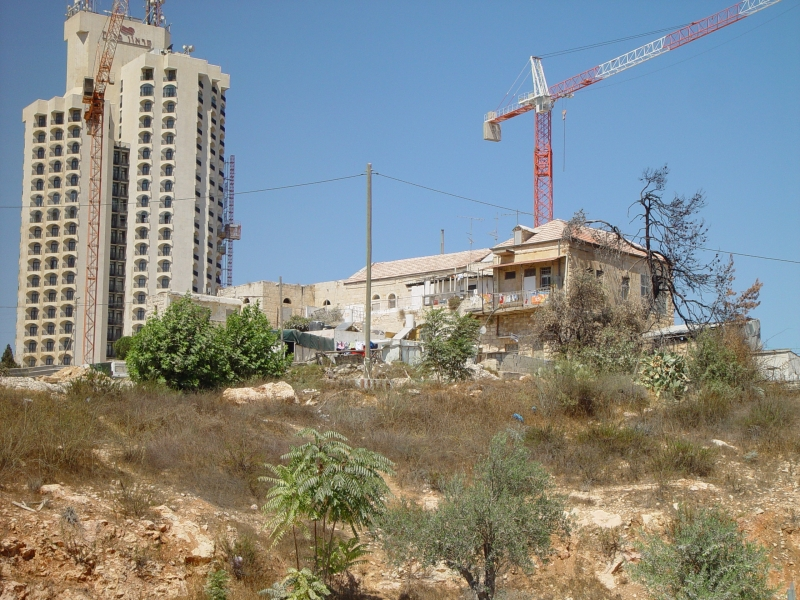
- Sheikh Badr house, 2008
- Etymology: from personal name
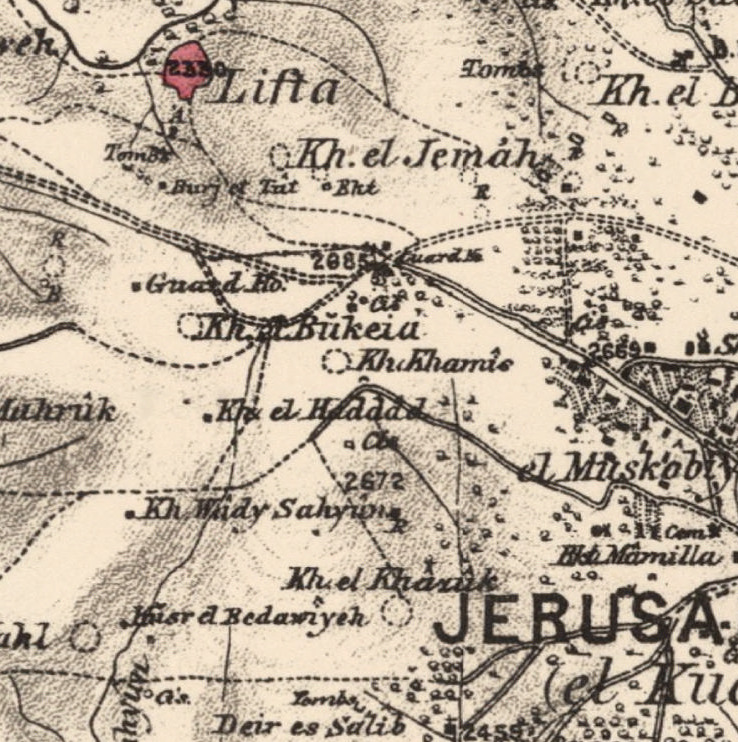
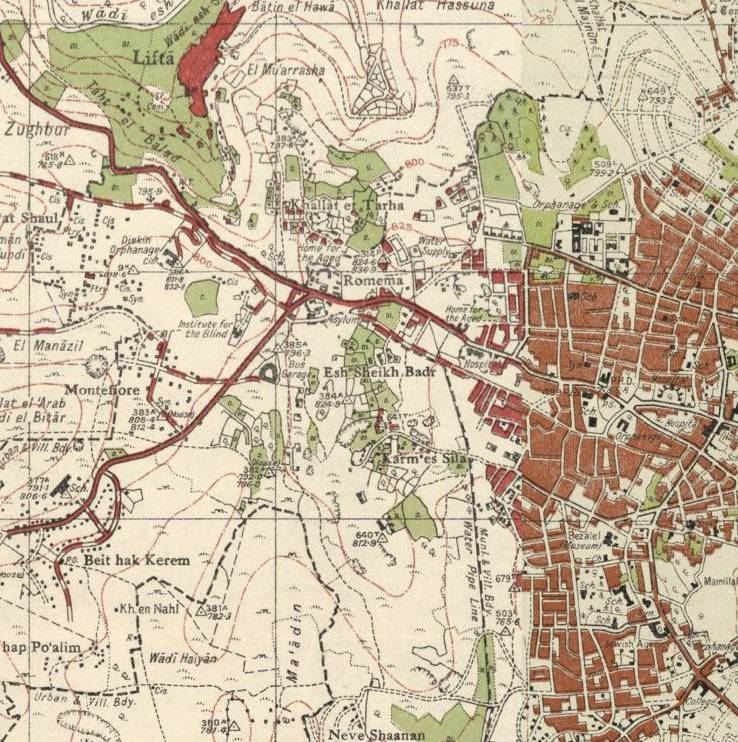
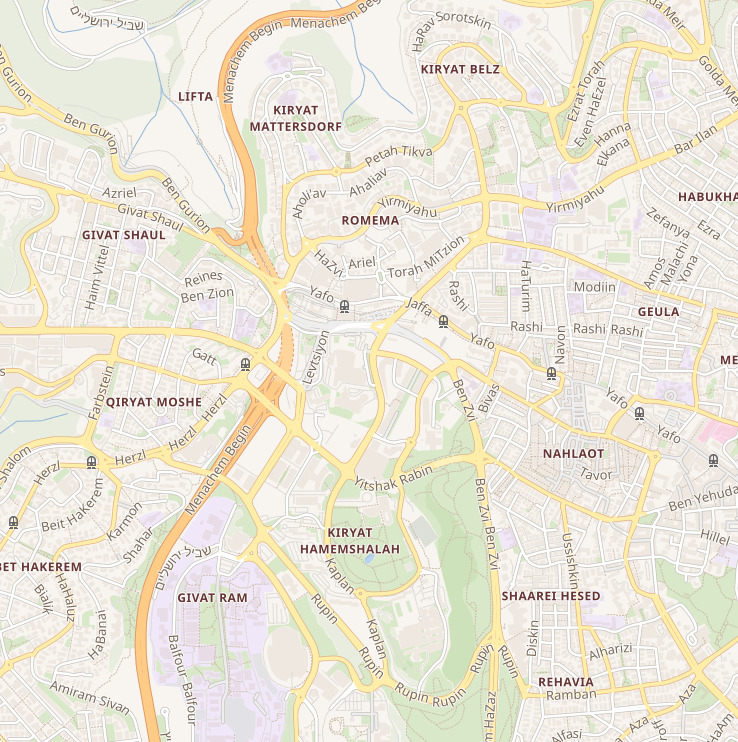
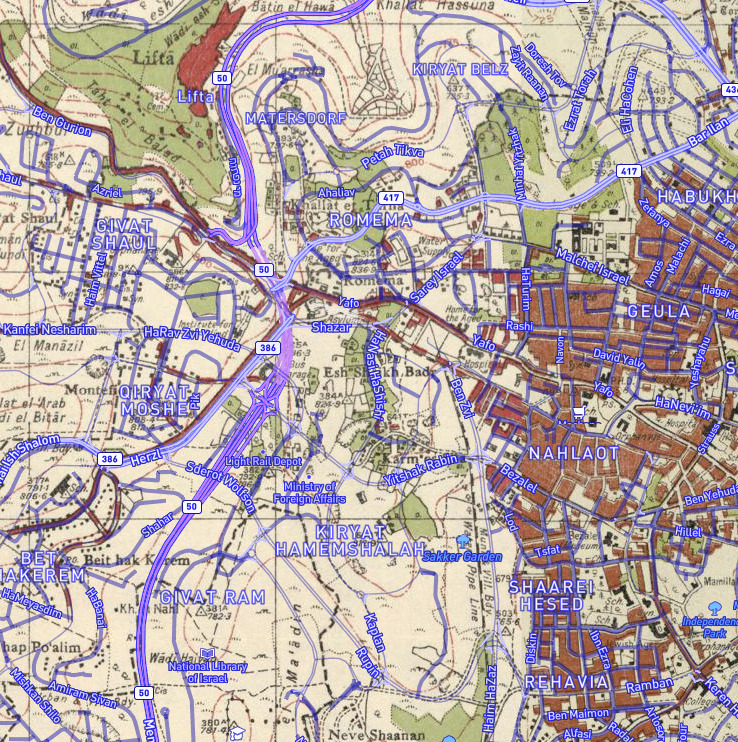
- 1870s map 1940s map modern map 1940s with modern overlay map A series of historical maps of the area around Sheikh Badr (click the buttons)

- Location within Mandatory Palestine
- Coordinates: 31°47′10″N 35°12′13″E
- Geopolitical entity: Mandatory Palestine
- Subdistrict: Jerusalem
- Date of depopulation: January 14–19, 1948

Sheikh Badr (Arabic: تلة الشيخ بدر, romanized: Talla aš-Šayḫ Badr, lit. 'Hill of Sheikh Badr' Arabic pronunciation: [tɑl.let ɑʃ.ʃeːx badᵉr]; Hebrew: שייח' באדר) was a Palestinian Arab village on a hilltop in west Jerusalem. The Haganah expelled its population during the 1947–1948 Civil War in Mandatory Palestine. From 1948 to 1951, Sheikh Badr Cemetery, a temporary Jewish cemetery was established here; a few hundred graves still remain from that time. After 1949, the area was incorporated into a new area called Givat Ram.

== Location ==
Sheikh Badr was on a hilltop south of Jaffa Road, extending from the present-day Hebrew University of Jerusalem at Givat Ram to the Jerusalem International Convention Center (Binyanei HaUma). Its western flank was bordered to the north by the Jewish neighborhood of Romema, founded in 1921, placing it close to the entrance to the city of Jerusalem.

The site is now occupied by the International Convention Center and the Crowne Plaza Hotel.

== History ==
=== Antiquity ===
Archaeological excavations indicate that the area of Sheikh Badr was inhabited from Iron Age II to the Byzantine period (late 8th century BCE to early 7th century CE). It appears to have been "strategically located at the top of the ascent from the coastal plain (or descent for those leaving the Old City of Jerusalem)". Digs were carried out in 1949, 1968 and 1992–1993.

=== Ottoman era ===
An Ottoman village list of about 1870 described Schech Bedr as a Muslim Wali in Jerusalem, with ruins from earlier settlements.

=== British Mandate ===
During the British Mandate for Palestine, Sheikh Badr was a semi-rural Arab village in western Jerusalem which benefited from its proximity to the major Jewish neighborhoods and thus increased employment opportunities. The villagers grew wheat in what is now Sacher Park.

During the 1947–1948 Civil War in Mandatory Palestine, the Haganah set in motion a plan to occupy (and if met with resistance, evacuate) Arab villages in order to protect nearby Jewish communities and to strengthen the Jewish hold on these sites. Sheikh Badr and Lifta were the first Arab villages to undergo mass evacuation. To create a "general air of insecurity" that would speed up the process, the Lehi blew up the home of the village mukhtar, Haj Suleiman Hamini, on January 11, 1948. Two days later Haganah launched another raid on Sheikh Badr, damaging 20 houses. The Arab residents evacuated Sheikh Badr between January 14 and 19, after which British policemen came in to guard the vacated homes. However, Jews from the neighborhood of Nahlaot made several raids on the deserted village, destroying and setting fire to remaining property.

=== State of Israel ===
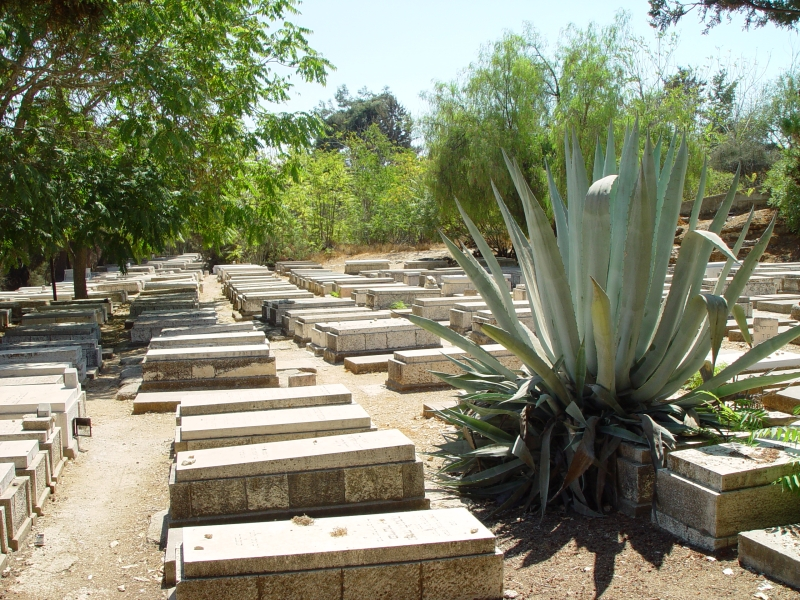
Sheikh Badr Cemetery.

Until 1948, Jewish burials in Jerusalem were conducted in the centuries-old Jewish cemetery on the Mount of Olives. In January 1948, the Arab siege of Jerusalem made the Mount of Olives inaccessible, as the route to the cemetery passed through hostile Arab villages. After war broke out in May 1948, two temporary burial grounds were opened in central Jerusalem – one in Sheikh Badr and the other on the grounds of the first Shaare Zedek Hospital.

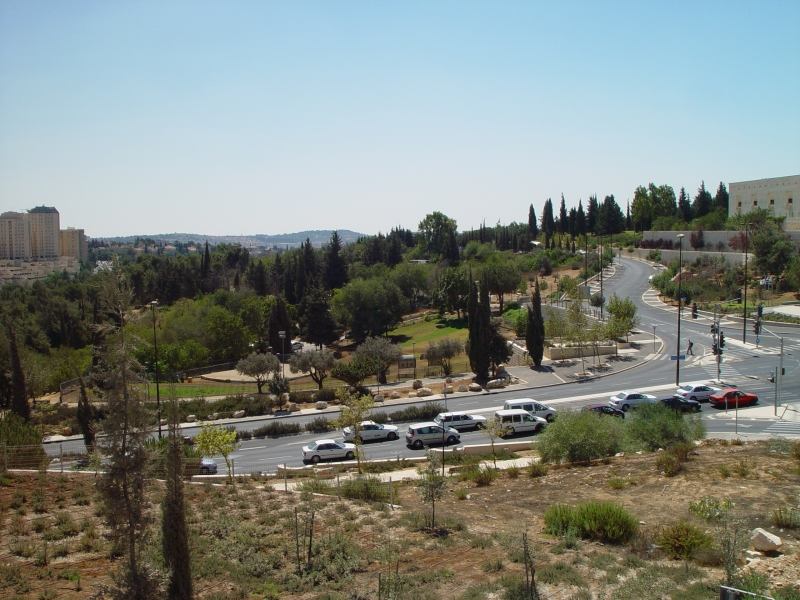
View of former area of Sheikh Badr, now Sacher Park. The Israel Supreme Court building is at right.

The Sheikh Badr cemetery functioned as a temporary burial ground from its opening on May 31, 1948, through late 1950. Unlike regular Jewish burials in Israel in which the deceased is placed directly into the grave, the deceased in Sheikh Badr were placed in wooden caskets above-ground to expedite their removal once the war ended. An adjoining quarry was also used for burials; here, bodies were buried in three layers, one atop the other, with a layer of dirt between each one. In late 1950, approximately 300 soldiers buried in the cemetery were reinterred on Mount Herzl, and 600 civilians were reinterred on Har HaMenuchot. In mid-1955, the decision was made to bury the remaining bodies in the Sheikh Badr cemetery in earth and to erect a headstone over each grave.

In 1949 Sheikh Badr was incorporated into a larger area renamed Givat Ram.

== Notable residents ==
- Yitzhak Navon

== See also ==
- Depopulated Palestinian locations in Israel
- List of villages depopulated during the Arab-Israeli conflict

== Bibliography ==
- Barron, J.B., ed. (1923). Palestine: Report and General Abstracts of the Census of 1922. Government of Palestine.
- Conder, C.R.; Kitchener, H.H. (1883). The Survey of Western Palestine: Memoirs of the Topography, Orography, Hydrography, and Archaeology. Vol. 3. London: Committee of the Palestine Exploration Fund.
- Khalidi, W. (1992). All That Remains: The Palestinian Villages Occupied and Depopulated by Israel in 1948. Washington D.C.: Institute for Palestine Studies. ISBN 0-88728-224-5.
- Morris, B. (2004). The Birth of the Palestinian Refugee Problem Revisited. Cambridge University Press. ISBN 978-0-521-00967-6.
- Palmer, E.H. (1881). The Survey of Western Palestine: Arabic and English Name Lists Collected During the Survey by Lieutenants Conder and Kitchener, R. E. Transliterated and Explained by E.H. Palmer. Committee of the Palestine Exploration Fund.
- Socin, A. (1879). "Alphabetisches Verzeichniss von Ortschaften des Paschalik Jerusalem". Zeitschrift des Deutschen Palästina-Vereins. 2: 135–163.
