= Sanhedria Cemetery =

Jewish cemetery in Jerusalem

Coordinates: 31.797°N 35.221°E

- בית עלמין סנהדריה
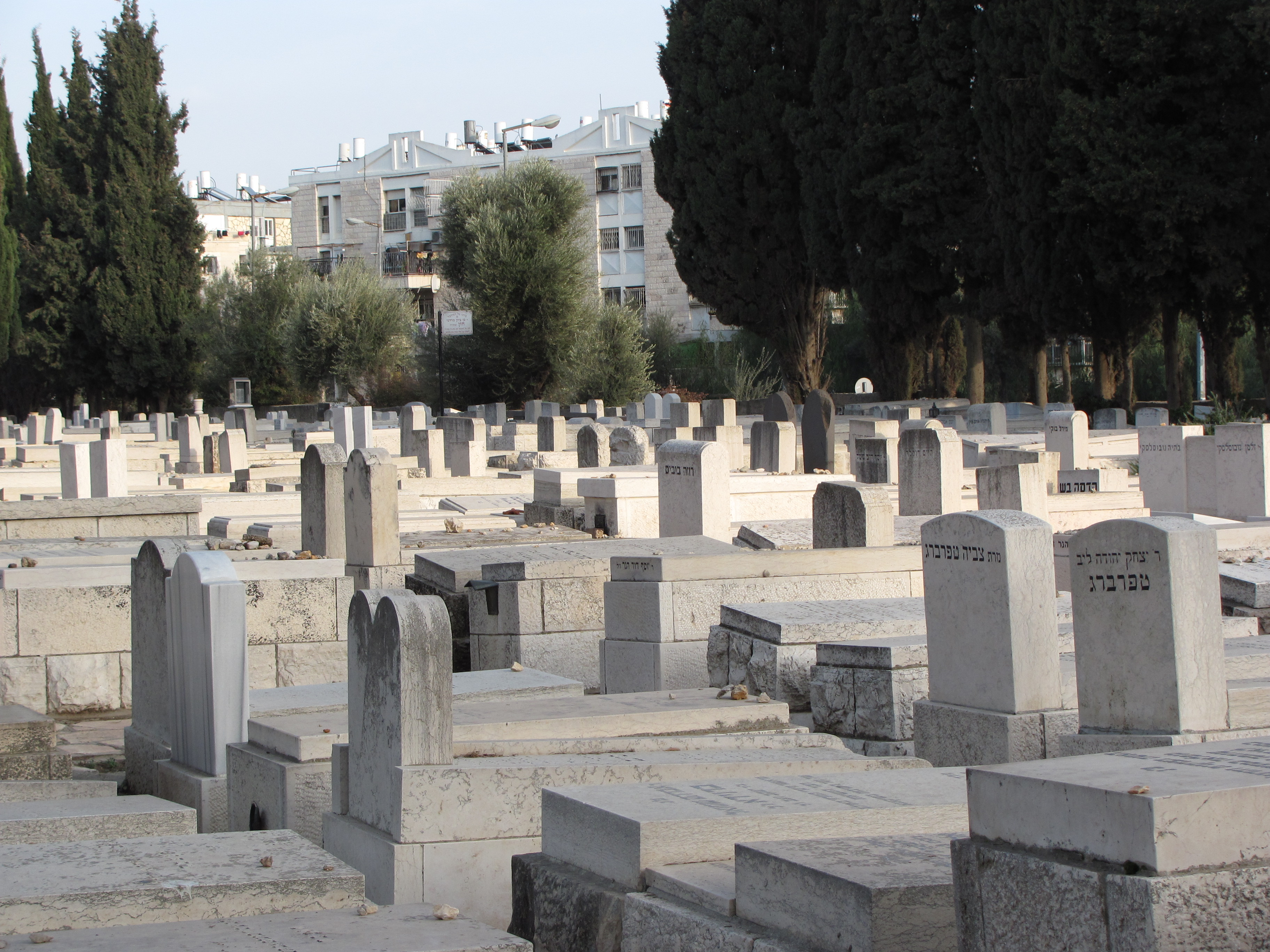
- Partial view of Sanhedria Cemetery, with Shmuel HaNavi neighborhood in background.
- Interactive map of Sanhedria Cemetery

Details
- Established: March 1948
- Location: Sanhedria, Jerusalem
- Size: 27 dunams (2.7 ha)

Sanhedria Cemetery (Hebrew: בית עלמין סנהדריה) is a 27-dunam (2.7-hectare; 6.7-acre) Jewish burial ground in the Sanhedria neighborhood of Jerusalem, adjacent to the intersection of Levi Eshkol Boulevard, Shmuel HaNavi Street, and Bar-Ilan Street. Unlike the Mount of Olives and Har HaMenuchot cemeteries that are located on the outer edges of the city, Sanhedria Cemetery is situated in the heart of western Jerusalem, in proximity to residential housing. It is operated under the jurisdiction of the Kehilat Yerushalayim chevra kadisha (burial society) and accepts Jews from all religious communities. As of the 2000s, the cemetery is nearly filled to capacity.

== History ==
Until 1948, Jewish burials in Jerusalem were conducted in the centuries-old Jewish cemetery on the Mount of Olives. In January 1948, the Arab siege of Jerusalem made the Mount of Olives inaccessible, as the route to the cemetery passed through hostile Arab villages. The catalyst for the opening of Sanhedria Cemetery was the March 23, 1948 explosion of three British army trucks filled with kerosene on Ben Yehuda Street in downtown Jerusalem. The explosion collapsed the Atlantic Hotel and heavily damaged adjacent buildings. Forty-two Jewish men, women, and children were killed in the blast, but there was nowhere to bury them. While the bodies lay in the courtyard of the Bikur Holim Hospital for five days, representatives of the Kehilat Yerushalayim chevra kadisha scoured the city for a suitable location for a new cemetery. An empty lot next to the Sanhedria neighborhood, in the vicinity of a government agricultural experiments station, was deemed appropriate, and permission was obtained from British Mandate authorities. The site was hastily consecrated by Ashkenazi Chief Rabbi Yitzhak HaLevi Herzog and Sephardi Chief Rabbi Ben-Zion Hai Uziel, and the bodies were buried on the fifth day in the presence of thousands.

In April 1948, 47 victims of the Hadassah medical convoy massacre, burned beyond recognition, were buried in a mass grave in the Sanhedria Cemetery. In the 1970s the son of one of the victims discovered that only 25 victims had actually been buried here and 22 had been declared missing.

With the outbreak of war in May 1948, Sanhedria Cemetery was located close to the front line on the northern border; for a while it was completely exposed to enemy fire. Burials resumed after the first cease fire on June 11, 1948, but four weeks later, the pallbearers at a funeral were targeted by Arab sniper fire and one died, causing a cessation of burials once again. Two small burial grounds in central Jerusalem – Sheikh Badr Cemetery in the Sheikh Badr neighborhood, and Shaare Zedek Cemetery behind the first Shaare Zedek Hospital – were then opened and used until the end of the war.

Following the 1949 Armistice Agreement, with the Mount of Olives remaining under Jordanian control, Sanhedria Cemetery became a regular burial ground. With the opening of the new neighborhoods of Shmuel HaNavi, Maalot Dafna, and Ramat Eshkol, the cemetery was encircled by residential housing.

After the establishment of the State of Israel, it emerged that the cemetery was not registered with the government land-ownership office and was in violation of certain building codes. While Israeli law mandates a minimum distance of 100 metres (330 ft) between graves and apartment houses, in some sections of Sanhedria Cemetery the distance is only 20 metres (66 ft). As a result of procedural violations, the cemetery was tied up in litigation for many years.

== Operation ==
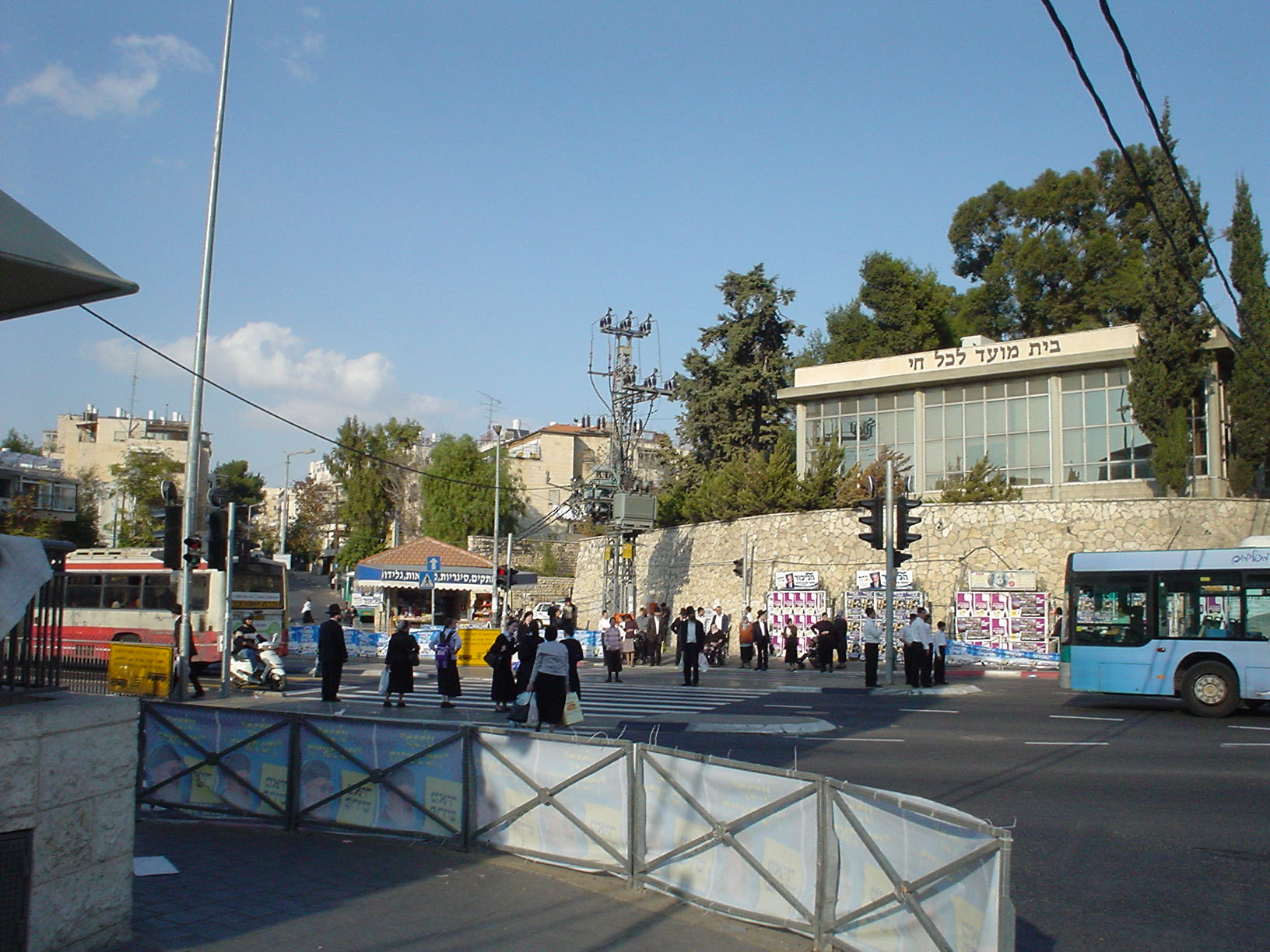
Sanhedria Funeral Parlor (right) with its large lettered Hebrew sign, "Meeting Place for All the Living".

Sanhedria Cemetery is operated under the exclusive jurisdiction of the Kehilat Yerushalayim chevra kadisha. This burial society was founded in 1939 by Zionist leaders and moderate rabbis of the Old Yishuv, leading many Haredi residents of the Old Yishuv to shun the Sanhedria Cemetery.

Graves are topped by a horizontal, rectangular limestone gravestone engraved with the name, date, and accolades of the deceased. The gravestones of Eleazar Sukenik, a noted Israeli archeologist who researched the nearby Tombs of the Sanhedrin, and his wife Chassia, are uniquely decorated with carvings and motifs of the Second Temple era.

The cost of burial at Sanhedria Cemetery is not subsidized by the state, as in other cemeteries. In September 2008 the price of a double plot stood at 75,000 shekels (approximately US$21,000), and by 2025 it had gone up to 120,000 shekels.

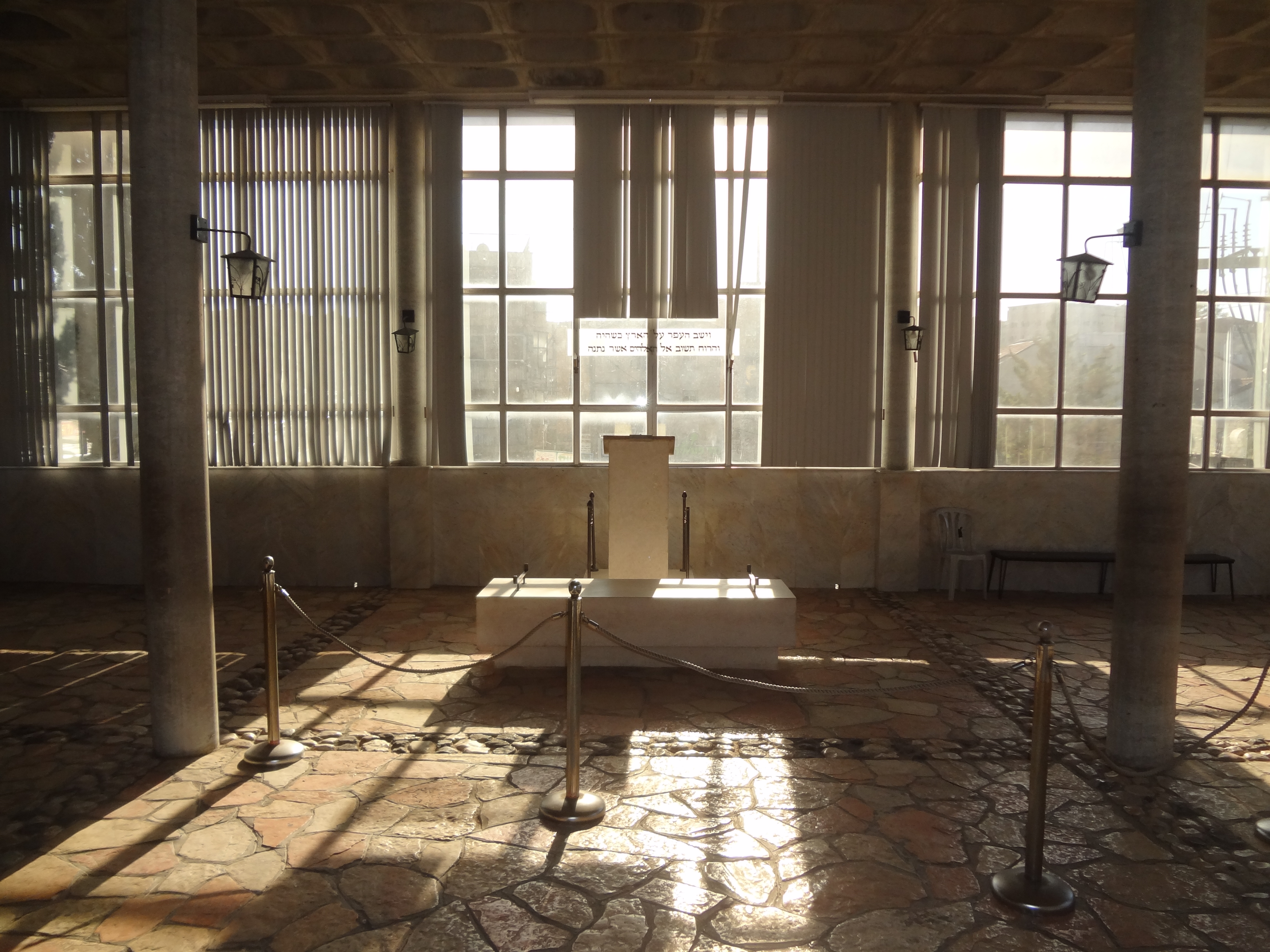
Interior of Sanhedria Funeral Parlor.

At the southern end of the cemetery stands the Sanhedria Funeral Parlor, which also conducts funeral services for burials in other cemeteries. In 1992, former Prime Minister Menachem Begin eschewed a state funeral in favor of eulogies at the Sanhedria Funeral Parlor and burial at the Mount of Olives. The side of the funeral parlor overlooking the busy commercial intersection of Shmuel HaNavi and Bar-Ilan Streets displays large metal letters that read: בית מועד לכל חי ("Meeting Place for All the Living").

A sign posted on the outer wall of the cemetery, facing Levi Eshkol Boulevard, warns Kohanim not to pass under the trees overhanging the wall in order to avoid tumat ohel.

== Notable burials ==
=== Rabbis ===
- Shalom Cohen rabbi in Jerusalem, oldest member of Moetzet Chachmei Hatorah, and rosh yeshiva of Porat Yosef Yeshiva buried right near Rav Ovadia Yosef
- Ben Zion Abba Shaul (1924–1998), rosh yeshiva of Porat Yosef Yeshiva, Jerusalem – follow the left path, go up the stairs on the left, between the steps from the second level to the third.
- Shmuel Berenbaum (1920–2008), rosh yeshiva of the Mir yeshiva, Brooklyn, NY
- Yaakov Moshe Charlap (1882–1951), rabbi of Sha'arei Hesed neighborhood of Jerusalem and rosh yeshiva of Mercaz HaRav Kook – a few rows to the right of the path in the central area by the entrance.
- Wolf Gold (1889-1956) Rabbi, co-founder of Yeshiva Torah Vodaath Jewish activist, and one of the signers of the Israeli declaration of independence
- Yitzhak HaLevi Herzog (1888–1959), Ashkenazi Chief Rabbi of Israel
- Yisrael Elazar Hopstein (1898–1966), Kohnitzer Rebbe
- Sadqa Hussein (1876–1961), rabbi of Shemesh Sedaqah Synagogue, Jerusalem
- Avraham Kalmanowitz (1891–1964), rosh yeshiva of the Mir yeshiva, Brooklyn, NY
- Shraga Moshe Kalmanowitz (1918–1998), rosh yeshiva of the Mir yeshiva, Brooklyn, NY
- Charles E. H. Kauvar (1879–1971), Conservative rabbi in Denver, Colorado
- Aryeh Levin (1885–1969), Jerusalem tzadik and "Rav of the Prisoners" – in the Charlap row
- Shimshon Aharon Polanski (1876–1948), Rav of Teplik, Ukraine
- Avraham Elimelech Shapira (d. 1966), Grodzhisker Rebbe
- David Feuerwerker (1912–1980), Chief Rabbi of Lyon (France), Rabbi in Neuilly-sur-Seine and Paris, Dayan in the Vaad Hair of Montreal, Canada
- Nissan Aharon Tikochinsky (1922–2012), director, Etz Chaim Yeshiva
- Yechiel Michel Tucazinsky (1872–1955), Talmudist and educator
- Duvid Twersky (1872–1950), Rachmastrivka Rebbe of Jerusalem
- Yehuda Tzadka (1910–1991), rosh yeshiva of Porat Yosef Yeshiva, Jerusalem – about halfway in on the right side by the fence with a tall sign next to the grave.
- David Alexander Winter (1878–1953), Rabbi in Lübeck
- Shaul Yisraeli (1909–1995), rosh yeshiva of Mercaz HaRav Kook
- Moses Rosen (1912-1994), chief rabbi of Romania
- Ovadia Yosef (1920–2013), Former Sephardi Chief Rabbi of Israel – All the way to the far right upon entering.

=== Israeli academics and government figures ===
- Yehuda Amichai (1924–2000), Israeli poet
- Umberto Cassuto, (1883–1951), Italian Jewish Biblical scholar
- Gad Frumkin (1887–1960), Israel High Court judge
- Simcha Holtzberg (1924–1994), Israeli activist
- David Horowitz (1899–1979), first governor of the Bank of Israel
- Esther Raziel-Naor (1911–2002), Israeli politician
- Cecil Roth, British Jewish historian (1899–1970)
- Gershom Scholem (1897–1982), German-born philosopher and historian
- Reuven Shiloah (1909–1959), director of the Mossad
- Eleazar Sukenik (1889–1953), Israeli archeologist
- Shmuel Tamir (1923–1987), Israeli Minister of Justice
- Saul Lieberman (1902–1983), Professor of Talmud in the Jewish Theological Seminary
