= Shmuel Brudny =

American rabbi

Rabbi Shmuel Brudny

Personal life
- Born: August 1915 Smarhon', Russian Empire present-day Belarus
- Died: February 15, 1981 (aged 65)
- Buried: Har HaZeisim
- Spouse: Rochel Brudny (née Leshinsky)
- Children: 3, including Elya Brudny
- Parent(s): Elya and Basya Brudny
- Education: Mir Yeshiva (Belarus)

Religious life
- Religion: Judaism
- Denomination: Haredi Judaism

Jewish leader
- Position: Maggid shiur
- Yeshiva: Mir Yeshiva (Brooklyn)
- Residence: Borough Park, Brooklyn, NY

Shmuel Brudny was an Orthodox Jewish rabbi in New York in the mid-twentieth century. He served as a maggid shiur in the Mir Yeshiva in Brooklyn.

== Early life ==
Brudny was born in August 1915 to Rabbi Elya and Basya Brudny in Smarhon', Russia (now in Belarus), during World War I. He studied in the Ashminer Yeshiva (a branch of the Novardok Yeshiva) and at the age of fourteen was accepted into the Rameilles Yeshiva of Vilna. He remained in Rameilles for three years before transferring to the Mir Yeshiva in 1932, where he was referred to as "the prodigy from Smarhon" and was given privileged treatment, receiving extra money from the rosh yeshiva (dean), Eliezer Yehudah Finkel.

== World War II ==
During World War II, the yeshiva fled to Vilna in Lithuania and later had to go into a hiding in the small town of Kėdainiai. With much outside help, notably from Avraham Kalmanowitz and Japanese consul Chiune Sugihara, the Mir Yeshiva left Lithuania before the Nazi occupation and via Russia and Japan, resettled in Japanese-occupied Shanghai, where he studied with Chaim Shmuelevitz. While in Shanghai he learned that most of his family had been murdered by the Nazis.

After World War II, the yeshiva relocated to the United States.

== United States ==
Brudny was among the first groups of students of the Mir Yeshiva to arrive in America, and so was one of the first students in the Mir Yeshiva in the United States. The yeshiva later moved to the Bedford-Stuyvesant neighborhood of Brooklyn and Brudny was appointed to give one of the most advanced shiurim (classes) in the yeshiva.

In the United States he married Rochel Leshinsky.

Among his first students at the Mir Yeshiva was Shlomo Brevda. His shiur was the largest class in the Mir Yeshiva, sometimes with as many as ninety students.

In the last few months of his life Brudny was the rabbi of an Aguda synagogue, today known as Agudas Yisrael Sniff Zichron Shmuel.

== Death and legacy ==
Brudny died on February 15, 1981. His children include Elya Brudny. Eliezer Ginsburg succeeded him as rabbi in the Agudah synagogue.
