= David Rebibo =

Moroccan-born America Orthodox congregational rabbi

Rabbi David Rebibo
- Title: Senior rabbi

Personal life
- Born: David Rebibo Rabat, Morocco
- Died: June 15, 2024
- Spouse: Odette
- Children: 5

Religious life
- Religion: Judaism
- Denomination: Orthodox

Jewish leader
- Position: Dean of students
- Synagogue: Beth Jacob Congregation
- Yeshiva: Phoenix Hebrew Academy
- Organisation: Greater Phoenix Vaad Hakashruth
- Began: 1965
- Other: President, Orthodox Rabbinical Council of Greater Phoenix
- Residence: Phoenix, Arizona
- Semikhah: Rabbi David Ashkenazi

David Rebibo was an Orthodox Jewish congregational rabbi, founder and dean of a K-8 Jewish day school, and founder and head of a kosher certification agency in Phoenix, Arizona. He was also president of the Orthodox Rabbinical Council of Greater Phoenix. He was a driving force behind the development of the Orthodox Jewish community of Phoenix since 1965.

== Early life and education ==
Rebibo was born in Rabat, Morocco to a Sephardic family. He attended the Yeshiva of Aix-les-Bains (Ecole Supérieure Talmudique or Yeshivat Chachmei Tsorfat) in Aix-les-Bains, France. He also studied law at the University of Paris. He received his rabbinic ordination from Rabbi David Ashkenazi.

In 1953 Rabbi Avraham Kalmanowitz of the Mir yeshiva of Brooklyn, New York, met Rebibo in France and hired him as his translator while he met with local Jewish leaders. Afterward Kalmanowitz advised Rebibo to move to the United States where he would find more opportunity for rabbinical positions. Kalmanowitz helped Rebibo obtain a student visa, whereupon the latter came to study at the Mir yeshiva for one year. Kalmanowitz helped Rebibo find his first teaching job at Yeshiva Magen David in Brooklyn. Rebibo next assumed the pulpit of a small synagogue in Memphis, Tennessee. During this time he took undergraduate and graduate coursework at Memphis State University.

== Move to Phoenix ==
Rebibo was recommended by Joseph Kaminetsky, then head of Torah Umesorah – National Society for Hebrew Day Schools, as the best choice to open a Jewish day school in the southwestern US city of Phoenix, which then had a population of 10,000 Jews. In 1965 Rebibo and his wife moved to Phoenix, where he threw himself into the task of opening the city's first Jewish day school, the Phoenix Hebrew Academy. Rebibo's efforts were opposed by the city's non-Orthodox rabbis, who believed that Jewish students should be absorbed into the larger community. Since most of the student body did not come from Orthodox homes, Rebibo calmed parents' fears that their children would be "converted" to Orthodoxy by setting a policy accepting children from all streams of Judaism. In time, some of the parents most active in the school were those belonging to the local Reform temple.

Phoenix Hebrew Academy opened on 7 September 1965 with 40 students in kindergarten and grades 1, 2, 3, 4, and 6. A few weeks before opening day, Rebibo spotted a "for sale" on a house at 337 East Bethany Home Road and acquired it as the school's first campus. In the 1970s, the school purchased a larger facility at 515 East Bethany Home Road, its current location. Rebibo has served as dean of students since the school's inception.

Also in 1965, Rebibo founded the Greater Phoenix Vaad Hakashruth kosher certification agency, which he continued to head until his death in 2024.

In 1966, he established Beth Joseph Congregation, an Orthodox congregation, where he is senior rabbi. In 2000 he co-founded the Greater Phoenix Israel Kollel, and in 2005 he led the effort to install a neighborhood eruv.

Rebibo was a strong supporter of the State of Israel and often speaks at Israel solidarity rallies.

== Family ==
Rebibo and his wife Odette have five children. One son, Joel, served as associate rabbi of Beth Joseph Congregation and educational director of the Phoenix Hebrew Academy before making aliyah in 1983; he has since worked as an editor at The Jerusalem Post and the English-language Hamodia newspaper. A daughter, Debbie Fox, a mental health professional, also taught in her father's day school.

== Honors and awards ==
- The Prime Minister's Medal of Devotion to the State of Israel, 1975
- UJA Federation Leadership Award
- Israel Bonds Man of the Year
- Rabbi Avraham Kalmanowitz Memorial Award (Mir yeshiva), 2004
