= Elya Brudny =

American Haredi rabbi

Rabbi Elya Brudny

Personal life
- Born: Eliyahu Brudny
- Parents: Shmuel Brudny (father); Rochel Brudny (mother)
- Education: Yeshiva Torah Vodaath

Religious life
- Religion: Judaism
- Denomination: Haredi

Jewish leader
- Position: Maggid Shiur
- Yeshiva: Mir Yeshiva in Brooklyn
- Organisation: Moetzes Gedolei HaTorah

Elya Brudny (born 1948) is an American Haredi rabbi. He serves as rosh yeshiva (dean) in the Mir Yeshiva in Brooklyn and is a member of the Moetzes Gedolei HaTorah of Agudath Israel of America.

== Early life ==
Elya Brudny was born to Shmuel and Rochel Brudny. As a child, his parents sent him and his brother Abba to Yeshiva Torah Vodaath. He later studied in the Lakewood Yeshiva.

== Career ==
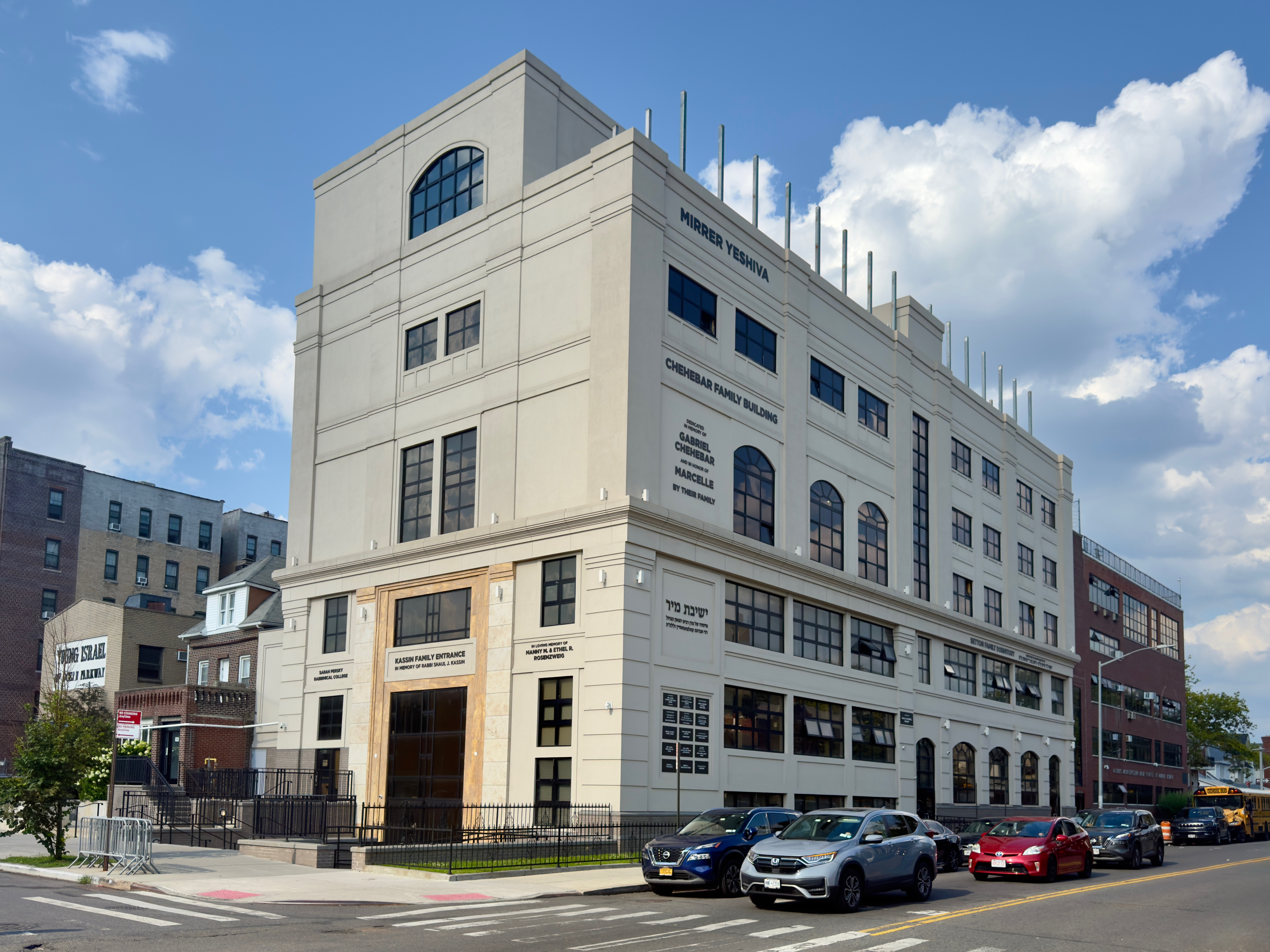
Mir Yeshiva in Brooklyn

Brudny serves as a leading Maggid Shiur in the Mir Yeshiva in Brooklyn, and as the leading member of the Moetzes Gedolei HaTorah. His opinion is often sought by the Haredi Jewish community, with his views often being printed in the English-edition Hamodia, the Flatbush Jewish Journal, and Mishpacha magazine. Brudny is often invited to speak at public events such as the Agudah convention and funerals, and said the kaddish at the 2020 Siyum Hashas.

In 2018, when New York State Education Commissioner MaryEllen Elia issued a directive to all yeshivas operating in New York to come into compliance with statewide educational standards, or otherwise face the penalty of losing public funding earmarked for record-keeping, school meals and computers, Brudny authored an opinion letter together with Yisroel Reisman in The Wall Street Journal opposing these measures. The pair later complained about being rebuffed by Elia when they tried to negotiate with her about the measures.
