= Fred Leighton =

American antique jewelry business

Fred Leighton is an American antique jewelry business based on Madison Avenue in New York City. The business is also known for lending jewelry to celebrities.

== History ==
The business was founded by Murray Mondschein when he bought a Mexican arts and crafts store in Greenwich Village called Fred Leighton in 1959. Mondschein added wedding dresses and Georgian, Victorian, and Art Deco jewelry to the inventory. In the 1970s, he moved the store to the Upper East Side, occupying several locations before landing at 773 Madison Avenue in 1986. That year, he legally changed his name to Fred Leighton.

Leighton began lending jewelry to celebrities in 1996 when client Miuccia Prada borrowed a necklace for Nicole Kidman to wear to the Oscars. Since then, celebrities have continued to wear Fred Leighton for events including the Golden Globe Awards and the Met Gala. The company's jewels have also been used in films including Marie Antoinette (2006), The Devil Wears Prada, and the Sex and the City series and film.

In 2005, Leighton sold the company to Ralph Esmerian. Under Esmerian's ownership, the company filed bankruptcy in 2008, and in 2010, Esmerian was charged with bankruptcy fraud, wire fraud, and concealing assets. He was sentenced to six years in federal prison and fined $20 million.

In 2009, Fred Leighton’s assets, including its inventory and retail stores in New York and Las Vegas, were acquired by Kwiat Enterprises, LLC together with Och-Ziff Capital Management Group and FOF Inventory Holding, in a $25.8 million bankruptcy court deal. Founded by Sam Kwiat in 1907, Kwiat is an American jeweler based in New York City and remains privately held by the Kwiat family.

== See also ==
- Kwiat jewelry
