= Shmuel Berenbaum =

American rabbi

Rabbi Shmuel Berenbaum
- Berenbaum in 2007

Personal life
- Born: Shmuel Berenbaum; March 13, 1920 Knyszyn, Poland
- Died: January 6, 2008 (age 87) Brooklyn, New York, United States
- Children: 11
- Education: Baranowicze yeshiva, Belarus; Mir yeshiva, Belarus

Religious life
- Religion: Judaism
- Denomination: Orthodox

Jewish leader
- Predecessor: Avraham Kalmanowitz
- Successor: Osher Kalmanowitz
- Position: Rosh yeshiva
- Yeshiva: Mir yeshiva, New York

Shmuel Berenbaum (March 13, 1920 – January 6, 2008) was an Orthodox rabbi and rosh yeshiva (dean) of the Mir yeshiva in Brooklyn, New York.

== Biography ==
He was born in Knyszyn, Poland and studied at Ohel Torah Yeshiva in Baranowicze, led by Elchonon Wasserman. He later studied in the Mir Yeshiva located in the town of Mir, later in Belarus. At the onset of World War II, he traveled with the rest of the Mir Yeshiva to Vilna, where they remained for three weeks awaiting visas to travel abroad. After receiving destination visas to Curaçao in the Caribbean, they were given travel visas by the Japanese Consul in Kovno, Lithuania, Chiune Sugihara. The yeshiva moved to Kobe, Japan, where they remained for 7 months before being settled by the Japanese Government in Shanghai, China.

Following the war Berenbaum traveled with the remnants of the Mir Yeshiva to the United States and settled in Brooklyn, New York. He married the eldest daughter of the Mir rosh yeshiva, Avraham Kalmanowitz.

After his father-in-law died in 1964 he became the rosh yeshiva of the Mirrer Yeshiva together with his brother-in-law Shraga Moshe Kalmanowitz.

== Death ==
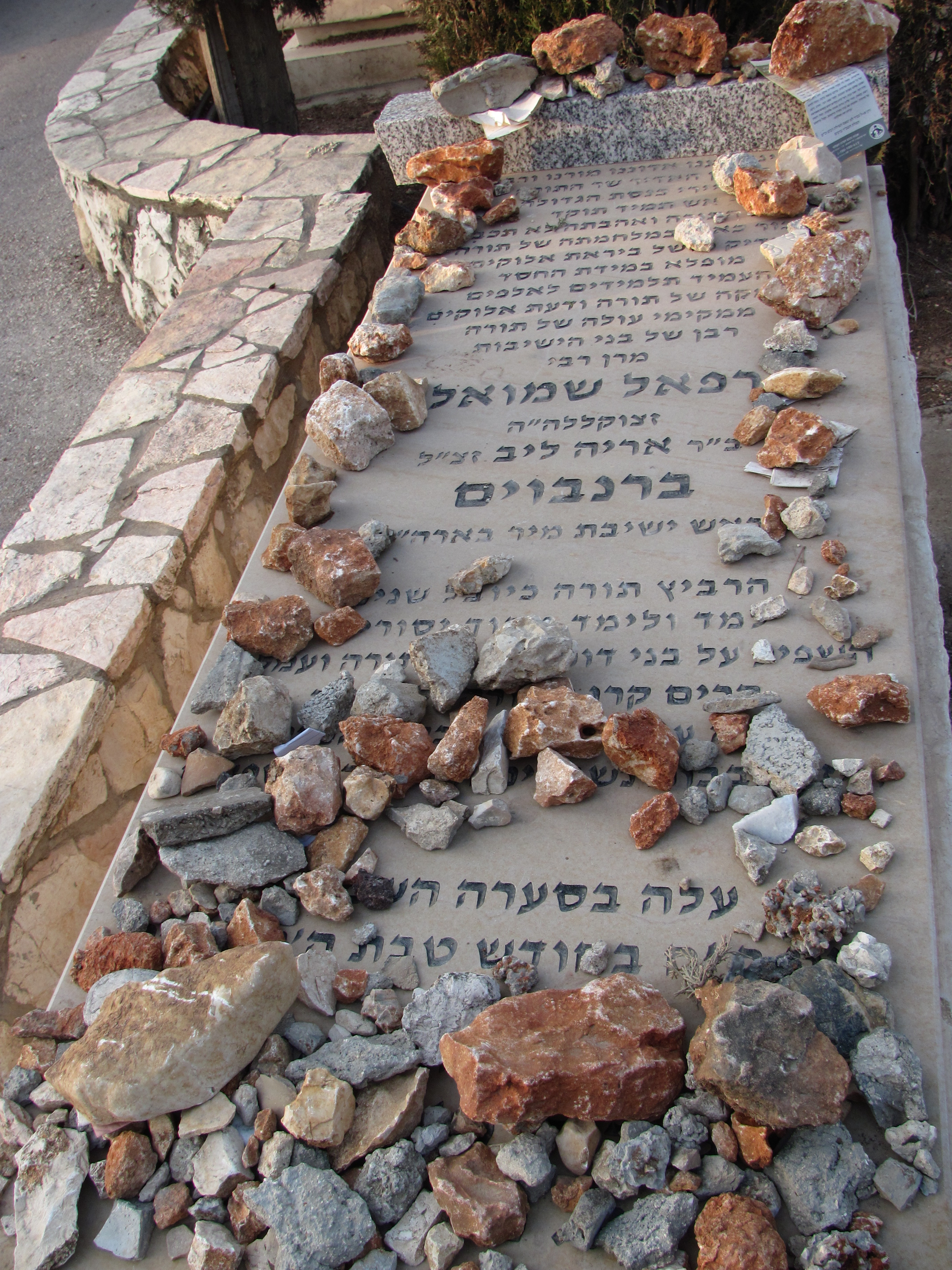
Berenbaum's grave, 2011, with visitation stones

Berenbaum died on January 6, 2008 (28 Tevet 5768) at his home in Brooklyn from medical complications due to stomach cancer, aged 87. His funeral, held on January 7 at the Mir yeshiva, was attended by tens of thousands of mourners. His body was flown to Israel for burial in the Sanhedria Cemetery in Jerusalem.
