= Avraham Kalmanowitz =

Belarusian-American Orthodox Jewish rabbi and rosh yeshiva

Rabbi Avraham Kalmanowitz
- Title: Rosh Yeshivas Mir

Personal life
- Born: Avraham Kalmanowitz; March 8, 1887 Dzialiacičy, Minsk province, Russian Empire
- Died: 15 February 1964 (aged 76) Miami Beach, Florida
- Buried: Sanhedria Cemetery, Jerusalem
- Children: Shraga Moshe; Yisroel Yitzchak; Betzalel; 3 daughters
- Parent(s): Rabbi Aharon Aryeh Leib and Maita Kalmanowitz
- Education: Slabodka yeshiva

Religious life
- Religion: Judaism
- Denomination: Orthodox
- Yeshiva: Mir yeshiva, Brooklyn, New York
- Position: Rosh yeshiva
- Began: 1946
- Ended: 1964
- Other: Rav of Rakov; Rav of Tykocin; Member, Moetzes Gedolei HaTorah of the World Agudath Israel

Avraham Kalmanowitz (also Abraham; Hebrew: אברהם קלמנוביץ; March 8, 1887 – 15 February 1964) was an Orthodox rabbi and rosh yeshiva (dean) of the Mir yeshiva in Brooklyn, New York from 1946 to 1964. Born in Russian Empire, he served as rabbi of several Eastern European Jewish communities and escaped to the United States in 1940 following the German occupation of Poland. In the U.S. he was an activist for the rescue of the millions of Jews trapped in Nazi-ruled Europe and in the Soviet Union. He arranged the successful transfer of the entire Mir yeshiva from Lithuania to Shanghai, providing for its support for five years, and obtaining visas and travel fare to bring all 250 students and faculty to America after World War II. He established the U.S. branch of the Mir in 1946. In the 1950s he aided North African and Syrian Jewish youth suffering from persecution and pogroms, and successfully lobbied for the passage of a bill granting "endangered refugee status" to Jewish emigrants from Arab lands.

== Early life and education ==
He was born in the shtetl of Delyatichi (Dzialiacičy), Minsk province, Belarus, to Rabbi Aharon Aryeh Leib and Maita Kalmanowitz. His father was a Talmid Chacham and Rav of several European Jewish communities. His father exerted a major influence on his education. He studied at the Telshe yeshiva in Lithuania, and at age 16 entered the Eishishok yeshiva headed by Rabbi Zundel Hutner. At age 18, he progressed to the Slabodka yeshiva, where the Alter of Slabodka, Rabbi Nosson Tzvi Finkel, arranged for him to learn in chavrusa with his own son, Rabbi Moshe Finkel. Kalmanowitz received rabbinic ordination from Rabbi Moshe Mordechai Epstein of Slabodka, Rabbi Raphael Shapiro of Volozhin, Rabbi Eliezer Rabinowitz of Minsk, and Rabbi Eliyahu Baruch Kamai of the Mir.

== Entering the rabbinate ==
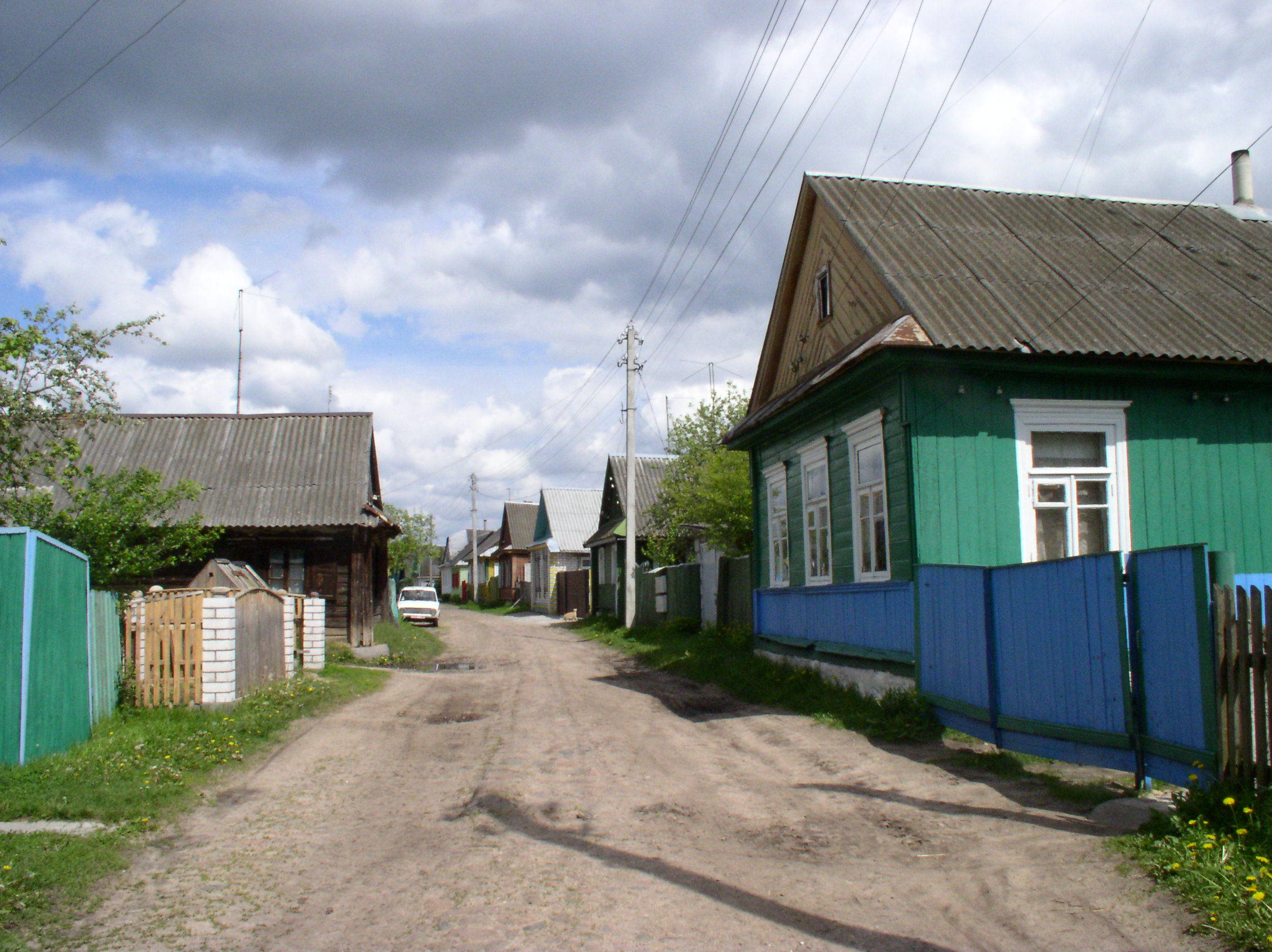
Street in Rakaŭ, Belarus (2006)

In 1913, Kalmanowitz married Rochel the granddaughter of Betzalel Hakohen, a dayan (rabbinical court judge) in Vilna. In 1916 Kalmanowitz founded a Talmud Torah in Rakaŭ on the Polish-Russian border and, in 1918, a yeshiva.

Kalmanowitz became a central rabbinic figure and communal leader, working on behalf of refugees and Jews in difficult straits. In 1914, when Rakaŭ was flooded with thousands of refugees fleeing Russia with the outbreak of World War I, Kalmanowitz founded a rescue organization that furnished food and clothing. During the Bolshevik Revolution, he aided Jews arrested by the Bolsheviks and was subsequently arrested and imprisoned in Minsk. Later he assisted Rabbi Chaim Ozer Grodzinski in the running of the latter's Vaad Hayeshivos, which provided financial aid and support to European yeshivas and their students. In 1928 Kalmanowitz helped Grodzinski found a kollel in Vilna called Ateret Zvi, and served as rosh kollel (dean) for its first year of operation. Afterwards he helped move it to Otvosk, where it operated until 1934.

In 1926, Kalmanowitz was elected honorary president of the Mir yeshiva and began fund-raising for this institution in the United States. During the 1930s, he applied for and received U.S. citizenship and a passport.

In 1929, he accepted the position of Rav and av beis din (head of the rabbinical court) of Tykocin (Tiktin), and established a yeshiva in that town. He was also a member of the Moetzes Gedolei HaTorah (Council of Torah Sages) of the World Agudath Israel. He was forced to flee Tiktin for Białystok after stopping a pogrom planned by local anti-Semitic elements, who slandered him to the local authorities.

== Holocaust activism ==
With the outbreak of World War II, Kalmanowitz fled to Vilna along with thousands of other rabbis and yeshiva students. With the blessing of Rabbi Grodzinski, he used his U.S. passport to travel to New York via Sweden, arriving in April 1940. He immediately plunged into rescue work on behalf of the rabbis, rosh yeshivas, and yeshiva students still in Europe, calling on rabbinical and political contacts which he had established previously. In the winter of 1940 Kalmanowitz joined the Vaad Hatzalah (Rescue Committee) headed by Rabbi Eliezer Silver, and became a key figure in that organization. He was known as a tireless agent for rescue, bombarding government officials with letters and telegrams pleading for help for all Jews trapped in Nazi Europe as well as for those stranded in the Soviet Union. Even before the U.S. government approved the legality of sending "free currency" (i.e., Swiss francs) into enemy-occupied territory for the purpose of supporting penniless refugees, Kalmanowitz sent money overseas, "ignoring illegalities and FBI threats of arrest".

Kalmanowitz openly worked on the Shabbat on several occasions in the name of pikuach nefesh (the Jewish principle of saving lives) by fund-raising in synagogues, filling out forms, and riding in taxis to government and institutional offices on Shabbat to obtain approvals and funds. The tall, regal-looking rabbi often broke down in tears and even fainted from emotion in front of government officials as he pleaded his cause. He successfully gained the support of U.S. Secretary of the Treasury Henry Morgenthau Jr. after crying uncontrollably in Morgenthau's office; Morgenthau helped him gain access to State Department officials. As Joseph J. Schwartz, chairman of the Joint's European Executive Council, told an interviewer, "There was a rabbi [Kalmanowitz] with a long white beard, who, when he cried, even the State Department listened". Kalmanowitz was one of the 350 rabbis who participated in the 1943 Rabbis March on Washington.

In the years following the war, Kalmanowitz joined Simon Wiesenthal and others in an effort to try and track down Nazi official Adolf Eichman, who was hiding in South America.

=== Saving the Mir yeshiva ===
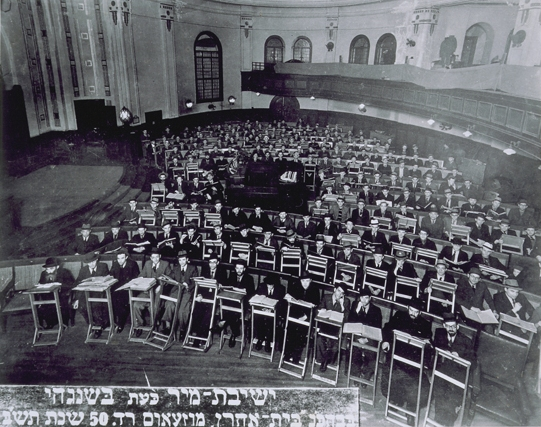
The Mir yeshiva in the Beth Aharon Synagogue, Shanghai

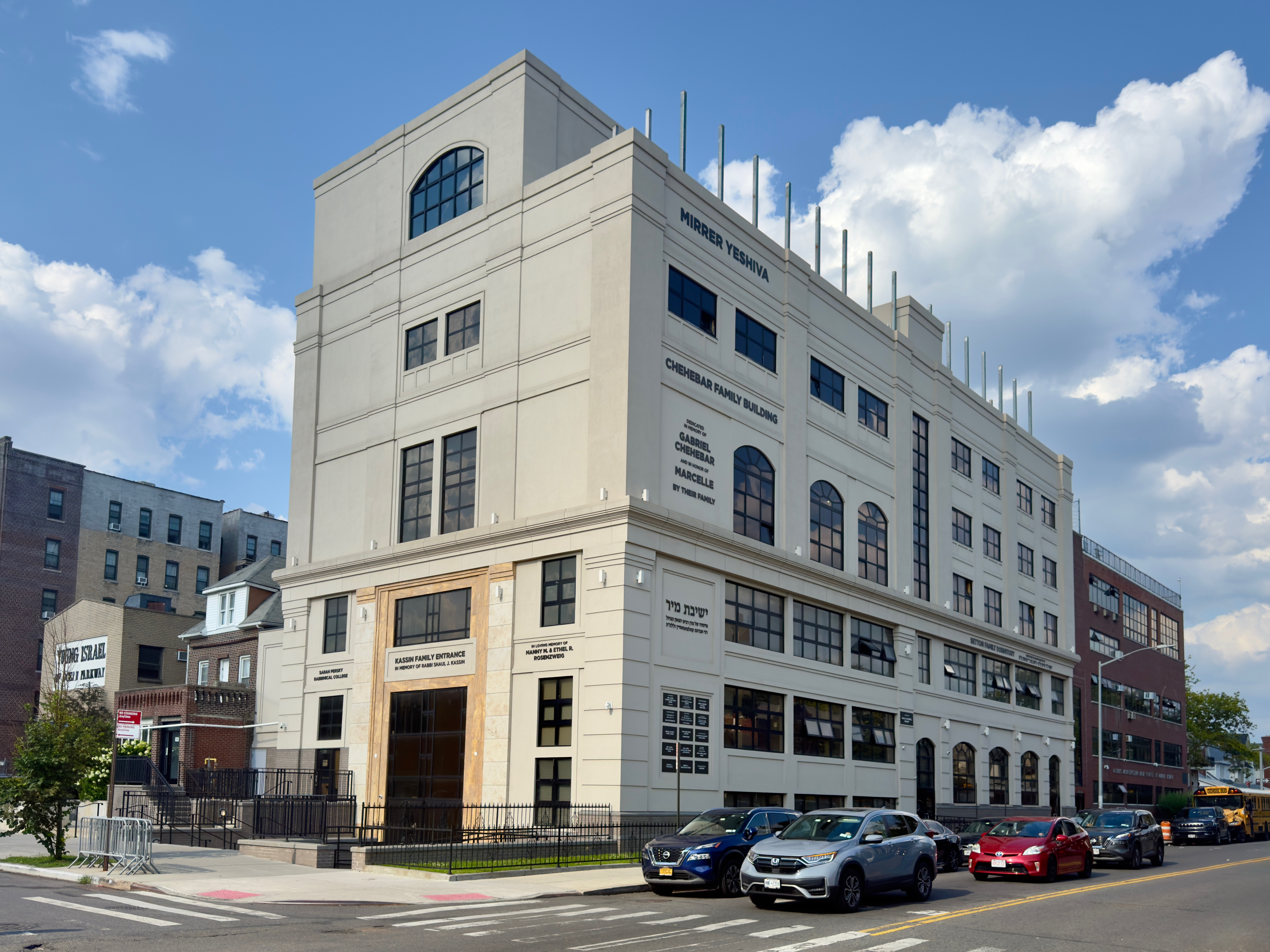
The current building of the Mir yeshiva

Kalmanowitz is credited with securing the funds and papers to transfer the entire Mir yeshiva – consisting of 250 students, faculty members, and the yeshiva's entire library of sefarim – to Kobe, Japan in 1941 and from there to Shanghai, and providing for its upkeep for five years. Thanks to the money Kalmanowitz sent, Mir students were able to board with Jewish families and eat a nourishing Shabbat meal most of the time – privileges that other refugee students in Shanghai did not enjoy. In addition to money, Kalmanowitz sent matzos and wine for Passover, and hundreds of copies of Talmudic tractates so the students could continue studying without interruption. After Japan attacked Pearl Harbor on December 7, 1941, and the U.S. declared war on Japan, the Joint was prohibited from sending money to the yeshiva students in Shanghai. But Kalmanowitz established new contacts and influenced U.S. government officials to tacitly approve the sending of funds from the U.S. to Japan via neutral Switzerland. At war's end, Kalmanowitz obtained visas and travel fare to bring all the Mir students and faculty by ship to San Francisco and by train to New York; the last Mir refugee left Shanghai in 1948.

In 1946, Kalmanowitz established a new branch of the Mir yeshiva in New York City with the help of Rabbi Yechezkel Kahane, father of Rabbi Meir Kahane. The yeshiva was first established in temporary quarters in Far Rockaway and Brownsville, and then in a permanent home in the Flatbush neighborhood of Brooklyn.

== Rescue work in North Africa ==
In the late 1940s and 1950s, Kalmanowitz inundated government, United Nations, and church officials with appeals to stop persecutions and pogroms against Jews in Egypt and Syria that eventually resulted in the dissolution of those communities. His efforts led to the passage of a bill according "endangered refugee status" to Jews in Arab lands, paving the way for their immigration to the United States.

Kalmanowitz worked onsite to strengthen traditional Torah education among North African Jewish youth. Together with the leaders of Jewish communities in Morocco and Tunisia, he helped found the Otzar HaTorah educational network, which established 28 yeshivas and 20 Talmud Torahs, as well as girls schools, in those countries in 1947 and 1948. Kalmanowitz also devised and pushed through a plan granting student visas to the Mir yeshiva in Brooklyn for North African Jewish teens and opened special sections in the yeshiva for them, even though the yeshiva's financial situation was dire. A group of 13 boys arrived from Morocco in 1948, but most left the yeshivah to find jobs. One of those who remained was Avraham Portal, a native of Marrakesh, who returned to Morocco in 1953 so he could apply for permanent residency status in the United States and in the meantime became the educational supervisor for the Ozar Hatorah network in the French region of Morocco. Portal returned to the Mir in 1956 with a hand-picked group of 15 boys and taught them in a separate program that became the Mir's first high school class. Another beneficiary of Kalmanowitz's largesse was Rabbi David Rebibo, a Moroccan-born student in France who used the student visa Kalmanowitz sent him to come study at the Mir in 1953. Afterwards Kalmanowitz helped Rebibo find his first teaching job. Rebibo has been dean of the Phoenix Hebrew Academy and senior rabbi of Beth Jacob Congregation in Phoenix, Arizona, since 1965.

== Death and succession ==
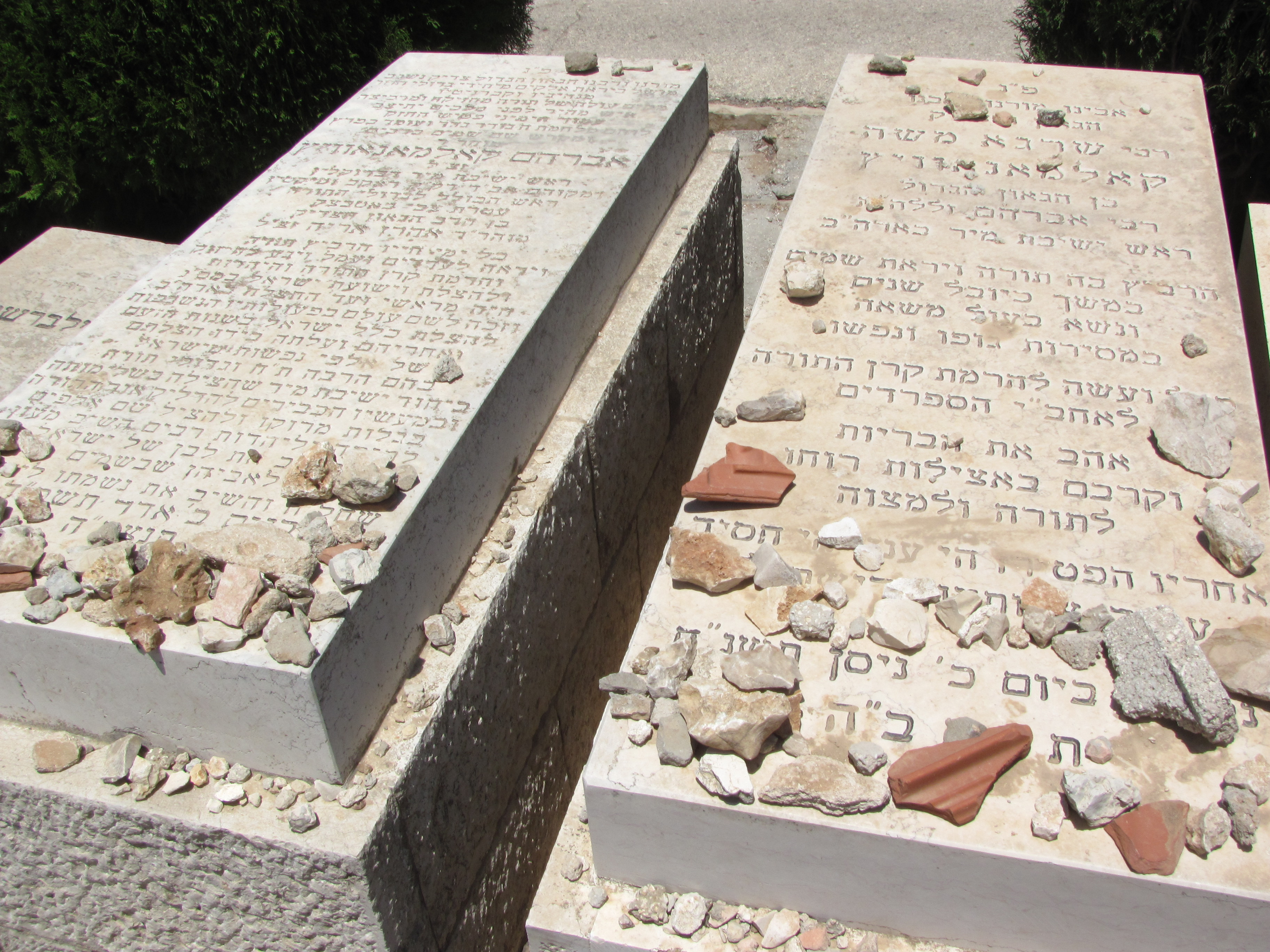
Graves of Kalmanowitz (left) and his son Shraga Moshe in Jerusalem

During a fund-raising trip to Florida in 1964, Kalmanowitz had a heart attack and died in Miami Beach on 15 February 1964 (2 Adar 5724) at the age of 73. He was buried in the Sanhedria Cemetery in Jerusalem near the grave of his father.

His eldest son, Shraga Moshe Kalmanowitz, and his sons-in-law, Shmuel Berenbaum, and Avraham Yaakov Nelkenbaum succeeded him as roshei yeshiva of the Mir yeshiva in Brooklyn.
