= Eleazar Sukenik =

Israeli archaeologist (1889–1953)

- אלעזר סוקניק
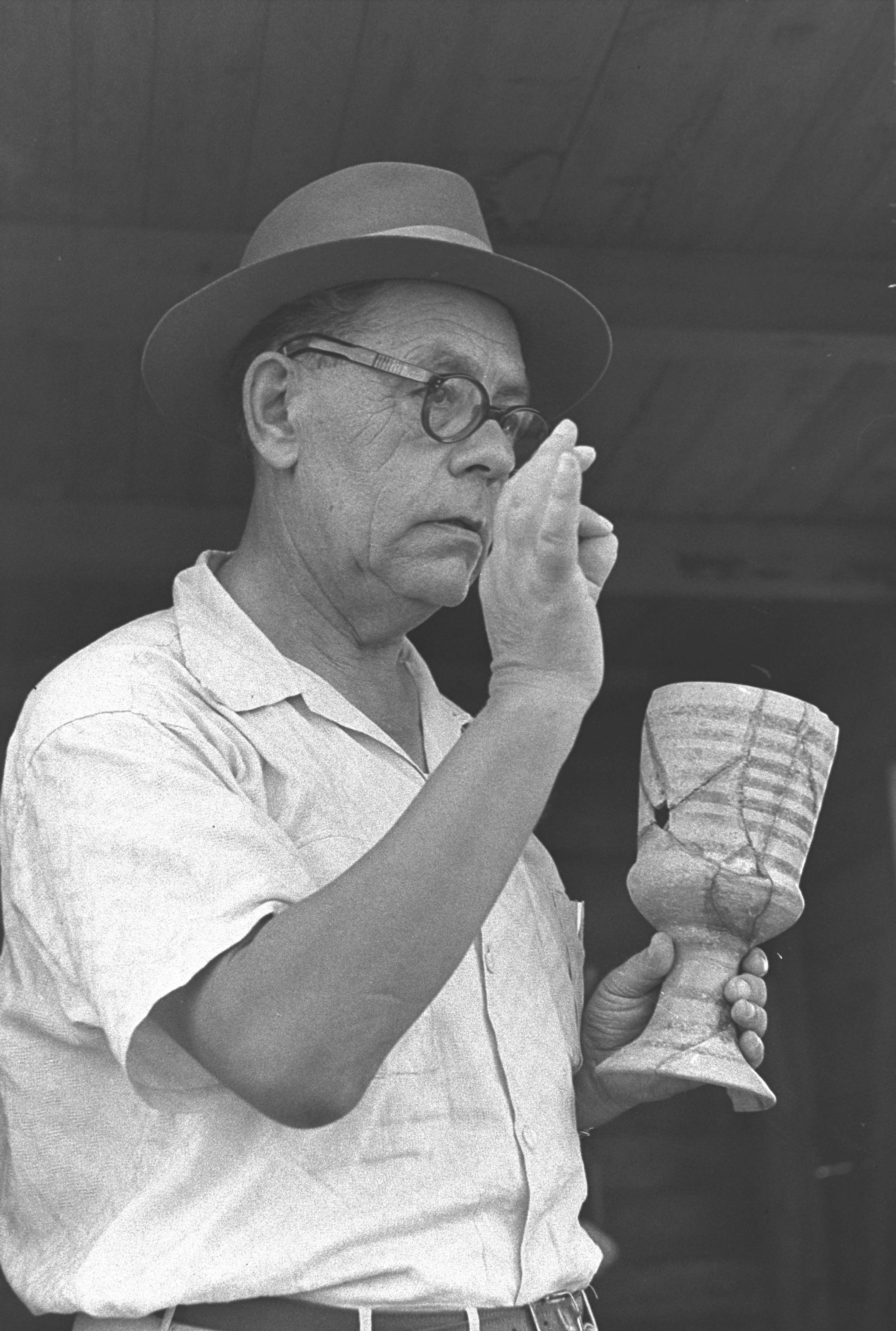
- Eleazar Sukenik, 1951
- Born: 12 August 1889; Belostok, Grodno Governorate, Russian Empire (now Białystok, Poland)
- Died: 28 February 1953 (aged 63); Jerusalem, Israel
- Education: University of Berlin; Dropsie College (doctorate)
- Scientific career
- Fields: Archaeology
- Workplaces: Hebrew University in Jerusalem

Eleazar Lipa Sukenik (Hebrew: אלעזר סוקניק; 12 August 1889 – 28 February 1953) was an Israeli archaeologist and professor at the Hebrew University of Jerusalem. He is best known for helping establish the Department of Archaeology at the Hebrew University and being one of the first academics to recognise the age and importance of the Dead Sea Scrolls. He also oversaw the uncovering of the Third Wall of ancient Jerusalem. He also was the director of the Museum of Jewish Antiquities at the Hebrew University.

== Personal life ==
Sukenik was born on 12 August 1889 in the town of Belostok, Grodno Governorate, Russian Empire (today Białystok in Poland). In 1912, he immigrated to Ottoman-ruled Palestine where he worked as a school teacher and tour guide. He studied archaeology at the Hebrew Teachers Seminary in Jerusalem. He obtained a degree from the University of Berlin in 1923 and in 1926 his Doctorate from Dropsie College in Philadelphia, Pennsylvania.

He served in the British army in World War I in the 40th Battalion of the Royal Fusiliers, which became known as the Jewish Legion.

He was married to Hasya Sukenik. They had three sons: General, politician and archaeologist Yigael Yadin, the actor Yossi Yadin (born Joseph Sukenik, 1920–2001), and Mati Sukenik, one of the first pilots of the Israeli Air Force, killed in action during the 1948 Arab-Israeli War.

Eleazar Sukenik was the brother of a pharmacist who lived in the United States, who in the 1950s was convicted for selling amphetamines without prescriptions and whose son, Herbert Sukenik, was a physicist who lived the second half of his life as a recluse in New York City.

Eleazar Sukenik and his wife, Hasya, were buried in the Sanhedria Cemetery near the Tombs of the Sanhedrin which he researched. Unlike the other graves in the cemetery, which are covered by uniform limestone blocks, the couple's gravestones are uniquely decorated with carvings and motifs of the Second Temple era. He was an atheist.

== Career ==
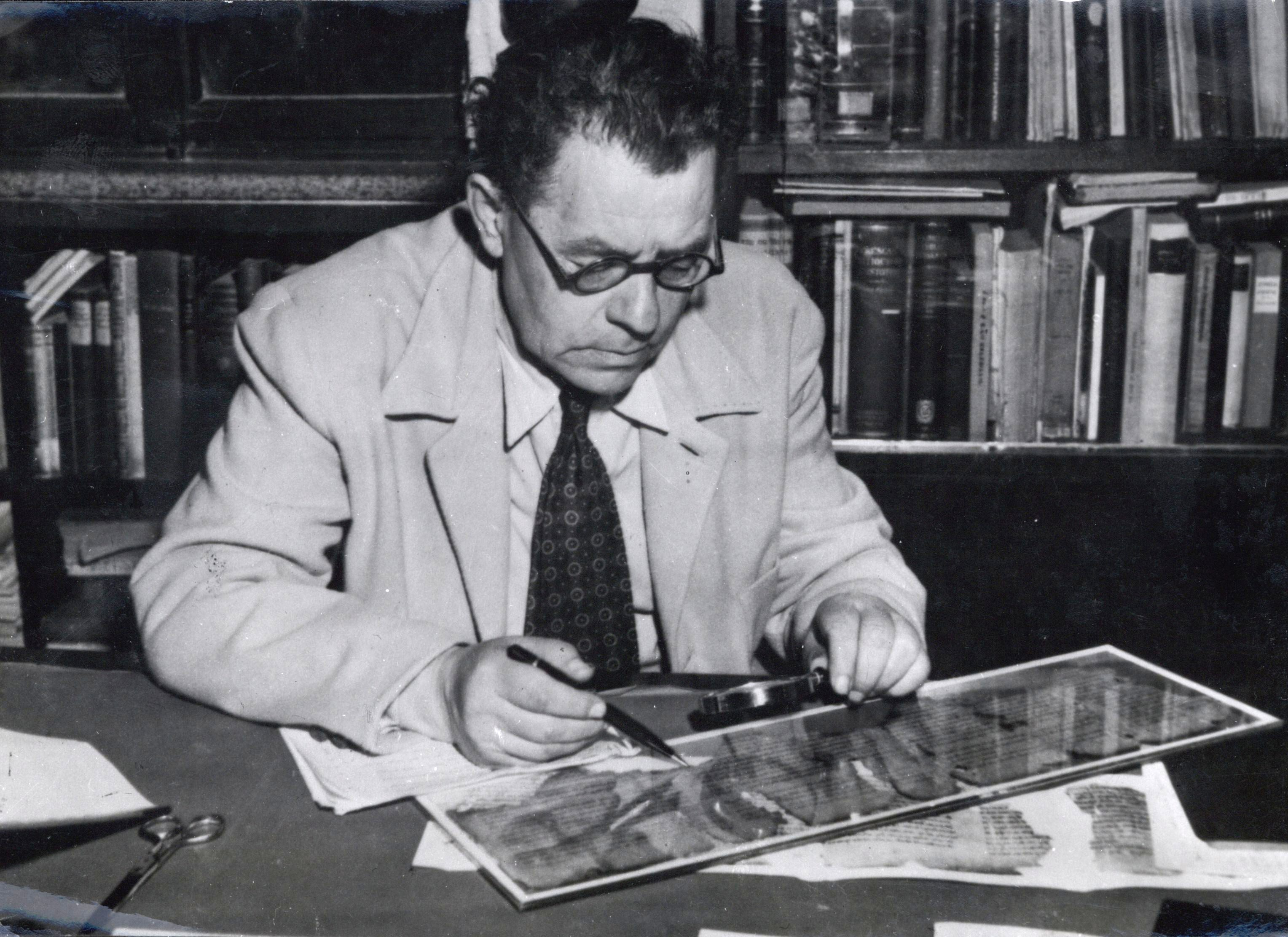
Eleazar Sukenik with one of the Dead Sea Scrolls

In addition to his important excavations in Jerusalem (including the "Third Wall" and numerous ossuary tombs), he played a central role in the establishment of the Department of Archaeology of the Hebrew University. He recognized the importance of the Dead Sea Scrolls to the State of Israel and worked for the government to buy them.

In 1941, he discovered a burial cave in the Kidron Valley containing an ossuary belonging to a "Cyrenian" and inscribed "Alexander son of Simon". This "Simon" is possibly the Simon of Cyrene mentioned in the New Testament, though his identity cannot be confirmed with certainty.

In 1948, he published an article tentatively linking the Dead Sea Scrolls and their content to a community of Essenes, which became the standard interpretation of the origin of the scrolls, a theory that is still the general consensus among scholars, but which has also been critiqued and nuanced by the community of scholars. In 1950, he received the Solomon Bublick Award of the Hebrew University of Jerusalem for this work.

== Works ==
- Ancient Synagogues in Palestine and Greece (Schweich Lectures of the British Academy for 1930). London, 1934.
- The Third Wall of Jerusalem: An Account of Excavations. Jerusalem: University Press, 1930
- The Ancient Synagogue of Beth Alpha. An Account of the Excavations conducted on behalf of the Hebrew University, Jerusalem. Jerusalem: Oxford University Press: London, 1932.
- Samaria-Sebaste Reports of the Work of the Joint Expedition in 1931–1933, and of the British Expedition in 1935. London, 3 volumes 1938, 1942, 1957.

As editor

- The Dead Sea Scrolls of the Hebrew University. Magnes Press, Hebrew University: Jerusalem, 1955.
