= Shraga Moshe Kalmanowitz =

Polish-American rabbi

Rabbi Shraga Moshe Kalmanowitz

Personal life
- Born: Shraga Moshe Kalmanowitz; May 15, 1918 Rakov, Poland
- Died: April 16, 1998 (aged 79) Brooklyn, New York, United States
- Buried: Sanhedria Cemetery, Jerusalem
- Parent(s): Avraham Kalmanowitz; Rochel Kalmanowitz

Religious life
- Religion: Judaism
- Denomination: Orthodox

Jewish leader
- Predecessor: Avraham Kalmanowitz
- Position: Rosh yeshiva (dean)
- Yeshiva: Mir yeshiva in Brooklyn, New York, United States
- Began: 1964
- Ended: 1998

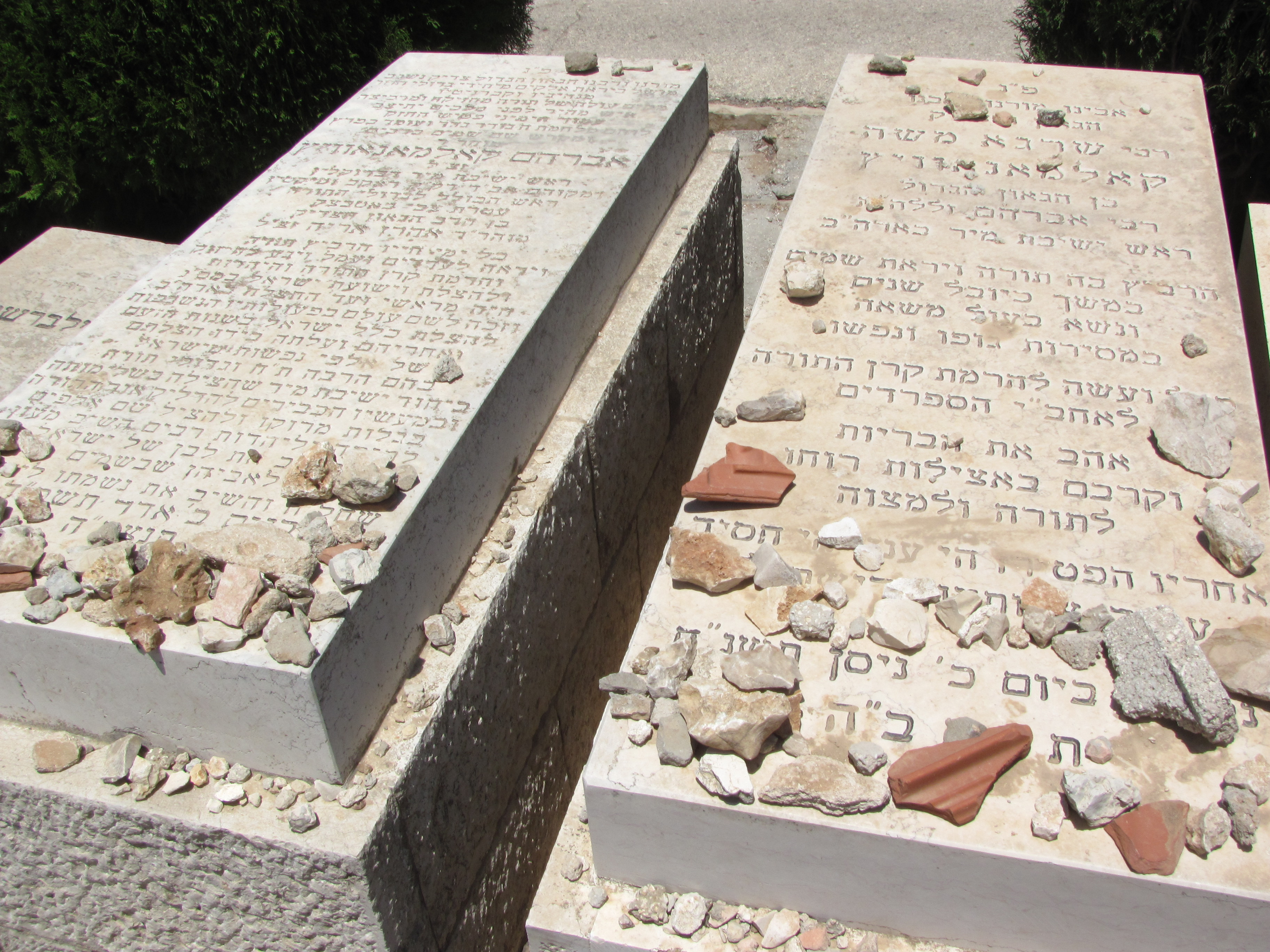
Graves of Kalmanowitz (right) and his father in Jerusalem.

Shraga Moshe Kalmanowitz (Hebrew: שרגא משה קלמנוביץ; May 15, 1918 – April 16, 1998) was a Polish-American Orthodox rabbi. He was a rosh yeshiva (dean) of the Mir Yeshiva in Brooklyn, New York, from 1964 to 1998.

== Biography ==
Kalmanowitz was born in Rakov, Poland, to Avraham Kalmanowitz, the rabbi of the town, and Rochel Cohen, the daughter of Betzalel Hakohen, a dayan (rabbinical court judge) in Vilna. He had the brothers and two sisters.

At the age of 10, Kalmanowitz began studying at the Mir yeshiva in Mir, Belarus, and later studied at the Kaminetz Yeshiva led by Baruch Ber Leibowitz. He came to the United States with his mother and siblings in 1941 (his father had immigrated a year earlier) and studied at both Yeshiva Torah Vodaas and Beth Medrash Elyon.

After his marriage, Kalmanowitz became a maggid shiur in the Mir Yeshiva in Brooklyn. Upon the death of his father in 1964, he and his brother-in-law, Shmuel Berenbaum, assumed the roles of roshei yeshiva. He followed his father's lead in overseeing the education of Sephardi North African students at the Mir Yeshiva. He was also close with Sephardi organizations in New York City; he was one of the speakers at the grand opening of the mikveh of the Sephardi Brooklyn community on Avenue S.

Kalmanowitz died on April 16, 1998 (20 Nisan 5758) in New York. He was buried beside his father's grave in the Sanhedria Cemetery in Jerusalem.

== Sources ==
- Gliksman, Devora (2009). A Tale of Two Worlds: Rabbi Dovid and Rebbetzin Basya Bender. Mesorah Publications, Ltd. ISBN 9781422608883.
- Finkelman, Shimon (2003). Rav Pam: The Life and Ideals of Rabbi Avrohom Yaakov HaKohen Pam. Mesorah Publications, Ltd. ISBN 1578193842.
- Kranzler, Dr. David; Gevirtz, Rabbi Eliezer (1991). "A Cry From the Heart: Rabbi Avraham Kalmanowitz". To Save a World: Profiles of Holocaust Rescue. CIS Publishers. ISBN 1-56062-061-7. "to save a world."
- Rossoff, Dovid (2005). קדושים אשר בארץ: קברי צדיקים בירושלים ובני ברק [The Holy Ones in the Earth: Graves of Tzaddikim in Jerusalem and Bnei Brak] (in Hebrew). Jerusalem: Machon Otzar HaTorah.
- Shapiro, Chaim (1996). Once upon a shtetl: A fond look back at a treasured slice of the Jewish past. Mesorah Publications, Ltd. p. 260. ISBN 9780899066424.
- Shapiro, Chaim (1982). "The Last of His Kind: Rabbi Avraham Kalmanowitz". In Wolpin, Rabbi Nisson (ed.). The Torah World: A treasury of biographical sketches. Mesorah Publications, Ltd. ISBN 0-89906-453-1.
- Sutton, Rabbi David (2005). Aleppo, City of Scholars. Mesorah Publications. ISBN 1-57819-056-8.
