= Phoenix Hebrew Academy =

School in Phoenix, Arizona, US

Coordinates: 33.523503°N 112.067072°W

Location
- 515 E Bethany Home Road, Phoenix, Arizona 85012; Phoenix, Arizona; USA

Information
- Established: 1965
- Founder: Rabbi David Rebibo
- Grades: Preschool, Pre-K, K-8
- Enrollment: 170 (in 2011)

Phoenix Hebrew Academy is an Orthodox Jewish day school in north central Phoenix, Arizona. Founded in 1965 by Rabbi David Rebibo, who was dean of students since the school's inception until his death in June 2024, it was the first Jewish day school in the region and one of the first outside the New York area. The school has a full dual curriculum of Judaic and general studies. In 2011 it enrolled 170 children in grades K-8.

== Background ==
The Jewish day school movement, initiated by Torah Umesorah – National Society for Hebrew Day Schools, numbered 35 day schools in the United States and Canada in 1940; that figure mushroomed to 300 schools by 1965. In 1965 Joseph Kaminetzky, then head of Torah Umesorah, recommended Rabbi David Rebibo, an alumnus of Yeshivat Chachmei Tzarfat in Aix-les-Bains, France, and the Mir Yeshiva in Brooklyn, New York, as the best choice to open a Jewish day school in the southwestern US city of Phoenix, which then had a population of 10,000 Jews.

== History ==
In 1965 Rebibo and his wife Odette moved to Phoenix, where he established the Phoenix Hebrew Academy, the city's first Jewish day school. Rebibo's efforts were opposed by the city's non-Orthodox rabbis, who believed that Jewish students should be absorbed into the larger community. Since most of the student body were not from Orthodox homes, Rebibo calmed parents' fears that their children would be "converted" to Orthodoxy by setting a policy accepting children from all streams of Judaism. In time, some of the parents most active in the school were those who belonged to the local Reform temple.

The Phoenix Hebrew Academy opened on September 7, 1965, with classes for kindergarten and grades 1, 2, 3, 4, and 6. First-year enrollment was 40 students. The school's first campus was a house at 337 East Bethany Home Road, where Rebibo spotted a "for sale" sign a few weeks before opening day. In the 1970s, the school purchased a larger facility at 515 East Bethany Home Road, its current location.

The school's success spawned the opening of six other Jewish day schools in the Phoenix area, including a "satellite" school in Mesa, Arizona, which opened in 1987 with 18 students in kindergarten through third grade. The Mesa school closed in 1990 due to budget constraints.

== Curriculum ==
Phoenix Hebrew Academy is an Orthodox Jewish day school with a full dual curriculum of Judaic and general studies. A dress code is enforced for boys and girls. In 2011, the school introduced separate-gender classes in Grades 7 and 8, and has subsequently separated Grade 6 in Judaic classes by gender.

Phoenix Hebrew Academy is one of few Jewish day school in the Phoenix area to serve kosher hot lunches cooked in its own kitchen. Students may bring their own kosher dairy or parve meals, but meat meals are strictly prohibited by the school.

== Current administration ==
- Rabbi Baruch Harris, Head of School
- Mr. Fred Graef, Principal of General Studies
- Mrs. Alyssa Zupnick, Preschool Director
- Mrs. Malka Harris, Assistant Principal
- Mrs. Gabby Jimez, Assistant Preschool Director
- Rabbi Billy Lewcowicz, Director of Student Life
