= Kwiat (jeweler) =

American jewelry company (founded in 1907)

Kwiat is an American jewelry company based in New York City. Founded in 1907 by Sam Kwiat, the company specializes in diamonds and fine jewelry. It remains privately owned and operated by the Kwiat family, with successive generations overseeing its operations. Kwiat is known for its engagement rings, wedding bands, and high-end diamond collections, and its pieces are sold through company boutiques and authorized retailers in the United States and internationally.

== History ==
=== Early 1900s ===
Kwiat was founded in 1907 by Samuel Kwiat, a Polish immigrant who established a shop on Canal Street in Manhattan's Lower East Side, then considered New York City's original diamond district. Initially trading in diamonds, Samuel later developed an interest in vintage jewelry and became active in the auction market for antique pieces.

=== 1933 to mid-1960s ===
In 1933, Samuel's 17-year-old son, David Kwiat, joined the business and learned diamond cutting and jewelry manufacturing. Under David's direction, the company expanded from trading loose stones into jewelry design and production, introducing collections of wedding rings, necklaces, and earrings. During the 1930s and 1940s, Kwiat became known for having one of the most significant diamond jewelry collections in the United States. The company is also credited with contributing to the development of Manhattan's modern diamond district in the 1950s. In 1955, Kwiat issued its first catalog.

In 1965, David Kwiat purchased a 126-carat rough diamond and cut it into the 50-carat "Teardrop of Africa" for Harry Winston.

=== Mid-1960s to early 2000s ===
David's sons, Sheldon and Lowell Kwiat, joined the company in 1964 and 1973, respectively, and assumed leadership in the mid-1970s. For several decades, Kwiat operated primarily as a diamond supplier to major jewelers, including Tiffany & Co. and Harry Winston. In 2005, the company began marketing directly to consumers under its own brand name.

=== Early 2000s to present ===
Lowell Kwiat's sons—Greg (CEO), Russell (COO), and Cory (Chief Digital Officer)—joined the business in the early 2000s. Greg Kwiat has become recognized as a diamond expert and is frequently cited in media outlets covering jewelry and luxury fashion.

In 2007, Kwiat opened its first flagship boutique on Madison Avenue in New York City.

In 2009, the company acquired Fred Leighton, a noted antique jewelry house, for $25.8 million.

== Products ==
Kwiat is known for its proprietary designs and trademarked offerings, including:

- Ashoka Diamond – a proprietary 62-facet diamond cut originally developed by William Goldberg, distributed in partnership through Kwiat in the United States.
- Kwiat Setting – a signature engagement ring design featuring a floating diamond basket.
- Kwiat Tiara Diamonds™ – a selection of diamonds that exceed Gemological Institute of America (GIA) cut standards.
- Fred Leighton Round™ – a proprietary diamond cut inspired by antique old European cuts.

Kwiat jewelry is sold at the company's boutiques in New York City and Las Vegas, through its website, and at authorized retailers across the United States.

== Celebrity clients ==
Several celebrities have been publicly documented wearing Kwiat jewelry at major events:

- Natalie Portman – wore Kwiat diamond "Orbit Huggies" bracelets at a SAG-AFTRA premiere.
- Margot Robbie – wore Kwiat diamond eternity bands at the 2024 Governors Awards and five-row Kwiat diamond earrings at the 2024 Academy Awards.
- Anne Hathaway – wore Kwiat diamond cluster earrings and platinum rings at the 2013 Screen Actors Guild Awards. She also received a six-carat solitaire diamond engagement ring from Kwiat in 2011, presented by Adam Shulman.
- Jennifer Hudson – wore Kwiat jewelry at the 2015 New York City Ballet Fall Gala.
- Iman – wore a 13.11-carat yellow radiant-cut diamond ring by Kwiat at the 2021 Met Gala.
- Carey Mulligan – wore three-carat round brilliant Kwiat diamond studs at the 2024 Screen Actors Guild Awards.
- Zoë Kravitz – wore the Kwiat "Between Us" pink-and-white oval diamond necklace at the 2022 Academy Awards.
- Sarah Jessica Parker – wore Kwiat three-carat pear-shaped diamond earrings at a Broadway reopening gala.
- Emma Stone – wore a Kwiat and Fred Leighton choker at the 2025 Tony Awards.

== See also ==
- Fred Leighton
