= Dovid Kviat =

American rabbi (1920–2009)

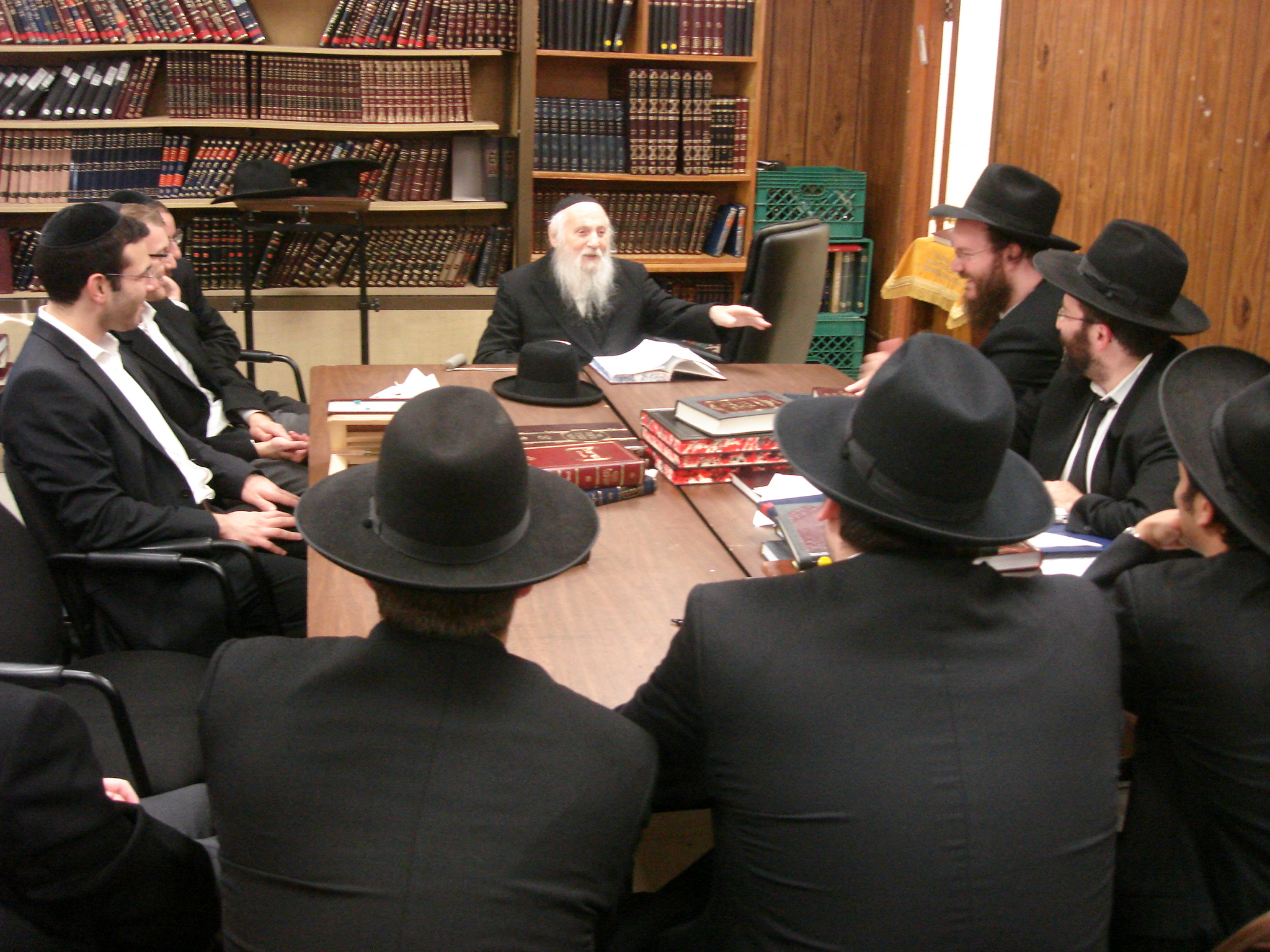
Rabbi Dovid Kviat in Carteret, New Jersey

Rabbi Dovid Kviat (December 6, 1920, Białystok, Poland – November 11, 2009, Brooklyn, New York, United States) was a Rosh Yeshiva in the Mirrer Yeshiva in Brooklyn and the Rabbi of the Agudas Yisroel Synagogue of 18th Avenue.

Rabbi Kviat was one of the last "Alte Mirrer", the title given to those who studied in the Mirrer Yeshiva in Poland, and who survived the hands of the Nazis by fleeing with the entire Yeshiva through Siberia to Kobe, Japan (through the efforts of Chiune Sugihara); and on to Shanghai, China.

== Biography ==
Rabbi Kviat was born in Białystok, Poland. His father was Rabbi Avrohom Eliezer Kviat. Rav Avrohom Eliezer was a student of both the Slabodka Yeshiva as well as the Novardok yeshiva in Europe, although he was a Slonimer Chasid. Rav Dovid had two older brothers, Yaakov and Yisroel.

The Kviat family was extremely poor as were most residents of Białystok at the time. At the age of three, Rav Dovid's mother, Chaya Reisha, died. Reb Dovid's aunt helped take care of him after that.

The Torah education system in Białystok was unique in that the Cheder and the Mesivta Yeshiva were both in the same city and under the same educational system. Most other cities only had a cheder.

Reb Dovid's two older brothers continued after Mesivta in the Slonimer Yeshiva called Toras Chesed. For some reason, Reb Dovid chose to go to one of the Lithuanian Yeshivos instead of the Slonimer Yeshiva. The choices were between the Yeshivos of Kaminetz and Mir. Reb Dovid chose Mir.

Rabbi Kviat is most famous for his works on the Talmud entitled "Sukas Dovid." Rav Kviat has written commentaries on the bible and the Jewish holidays, also named "Sukas Dovid."

He is interred on the Mount of Olives.
