= Sheikh Badr Cemetery =

Jewish cemetery in Jerusalem

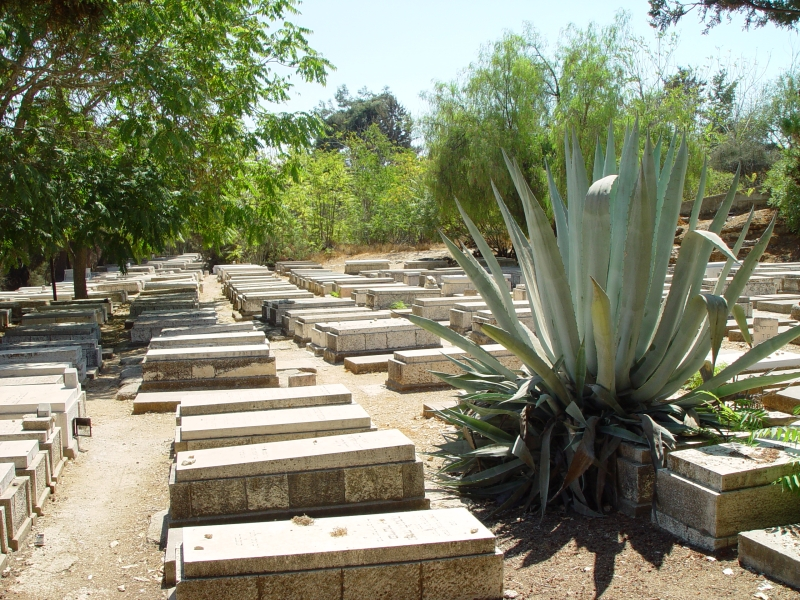
- Interactive map of Sheikh Badr Cemetery

Details
- Established: May 31, 1948
- Location: Givat Ram, West Jerusalem
- Coordinates: 31.7800°N 35.2057°E
- Size: 8 dunams (0.80 ha; 2.0 acres)

Sheikh Badr Cemetery (also Givat Ram cemetery) is an 8 dunams (0.80 ha; 2.0 acres) Jewish burial ground in west-central West Jerusalem. It was established as a temporary burial ground during the 1948 Arab siege of Jerusalem. Most of its military and civilian graves were transferred to Mount Herzl and Har HaMenuchot, respectively, in late 1950. The cemetery continued to accept burials up until the official opening of Har HaMenuchot in November 1951.

== Location ==
The cemetery lies between the Israeli Supreme Court building to the south and Sacher Park to the north, on land belonging to the former Arab village of Sheikh Badr. This village was depopulated in January 1948, during the 1947–1948 Civil War in Mandatory Palestine, on the order of the Haganah.

== History ==
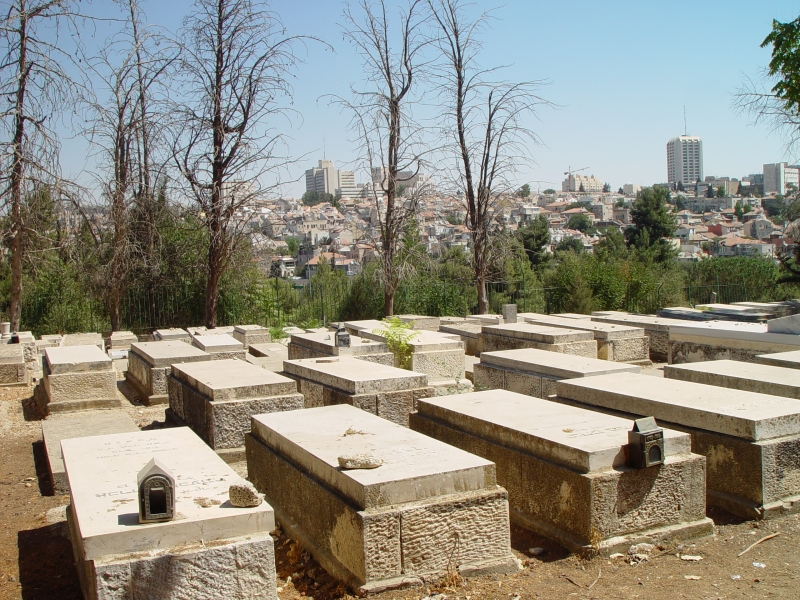
Graves of Sheikh Badr Cemetery with houses of Nachlaot in the background.

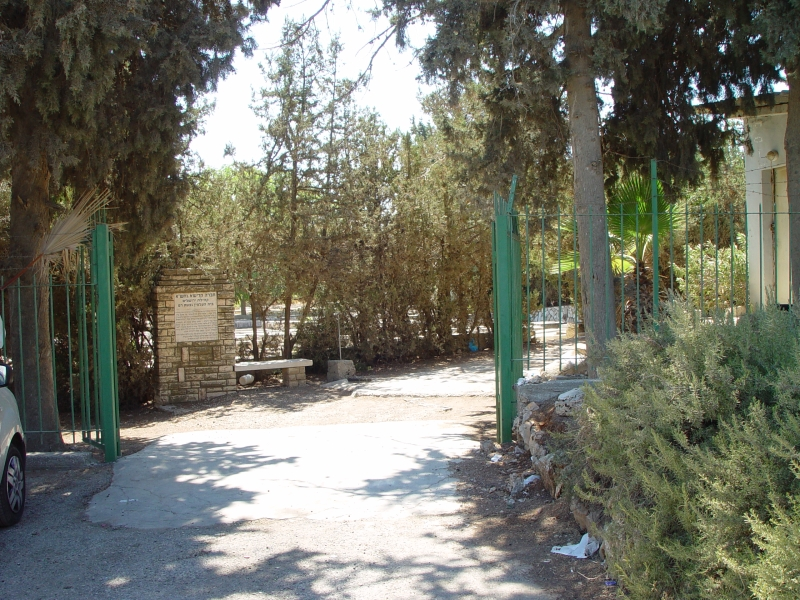
Cemetery entrance

Until 1948, Jewish burials in Jerusalem were conducted in the centuries-old Jewish cemetery on the Mount of Olives. In January 1948, the Arab siege of Jerusalem made the Mount of Olives inaccessible, as the route to the cemetery passed through hostile Arab villages. A new burial ground was opened next to the Sanhedria neighborhood on the northern border on March 28, 1948. However, with the outbreak of war in May 1948, the Sanhedria Cemetery lay on the front line and funerals were plagued by sniper fire. Two temporary burial grounds in central Jerusalem – Sheikh Badr Cemetery, and Shaare Zedek Cemetery behind the first Shaare Zedek Hospital – were then opened.

The Sheikh Badr cemetery opened on May 31, 1948, with 76 burials. It was designated as a temporary burial ground with the understanding that the bodies would be reburied in another, permanent cemetery after the war. To that end, the city rabbis ruled that, unlike regular Jewish burials in Israel in which the deceased is placed directly into the grave, the deceased in Sheikh Badr should be placed in wooden caskets to expedite their removal once the war ended.

As the military and civilian death toll from the war increased, there was much confusion over the burials, as cemetery workers and carpenters had all been drafted. An adjoining quarry was also used for burials; here, bodies were buried in three layers, one atop the other, with a layer of dirt between each one.

After the war ended, it became clear that the Mount of Olives would be inaccessible for an indefinite period. The Sheikh Badr cemetery continued to function. Bodies were still placed in wooden caskets, but the caskets were not buried in the earth – they were placed in open spaces on the ground and covered on all sides with dirt.

In late 1950, bodies began to be transferred out of the Sheikh Badr cemetery. The graves of 300 soldiers were transferred to Mount Herzl and the graves of 600 civilians were transferred to Har HaMenuchot. Burials continued at the Sheikh Badr cemetery until the official opening of Har HaMenuchot in November 1951. In mid-1955, the decision was made to bury the remaining bodies in the Sheikh Badr cemetery in earth and to erect a headstone over each grave.

Though the cemetery is no longer in use, it saw its first burial in over 50 years in October 2002, when the family of a Bnei Brak resident buried him next to his father in Sheikh Badr.

== Grave of the Zvhiller Rebbe ==
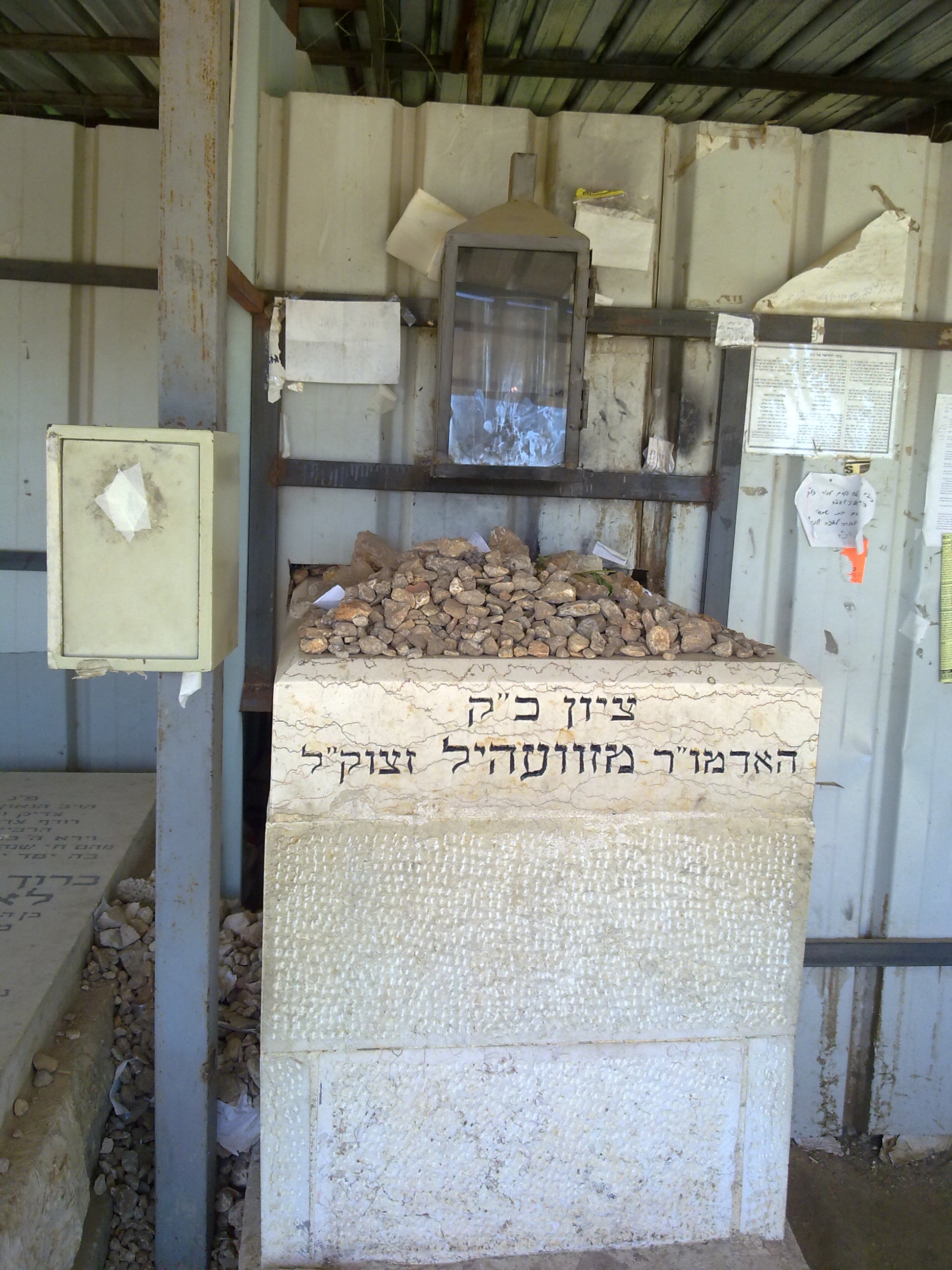
Grave of Rabbi Gedalia Moshe Goldman

Since 2008, the grave of Rabbi Gedalia Moshe Goldman, the Zvhiller Rebbe, (1887–1950) has become a popular site for visitors. A segulah has developed around the grave, in which petitioners who visit it on a consecutive Monday, Thursday, and Monday and pray for what they desire will have their wish fulfilled.
