= Mir Yeshiva (Brooklyn) =

Coordinates: 40°36′18″N 73°57′59″W

Mirrer Yeshiva Central Institute
- ישיבת מיר
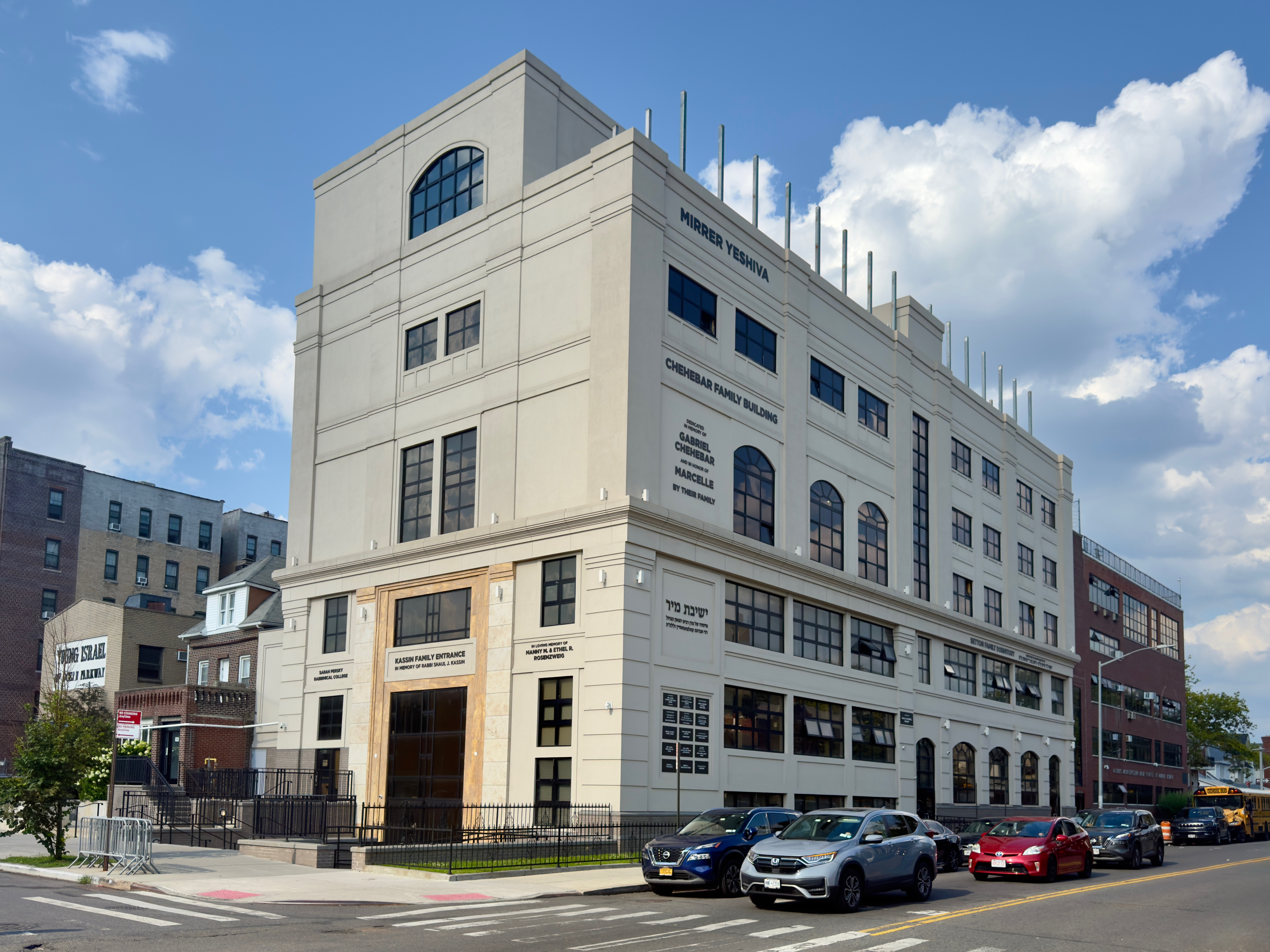
- The yeshiva in June 2020

Location
- 1791 Ocean Pkwy, Brooklyn, NY 11223; Brooklyn, New York; United States

Information
- Type: Private elementary, middle school, high school, beis medrash, and kollel
- Founder: Rabbi Avraham Kalmanowitz
- Website: https://www.mirmesivta.com/

The Mirrer Yeshiva Central Institute (Hebrew: ישיבת מיר, romanized: Yeshivas Mir), commonly known as the Mir Yeshiva or the Mirrer Yeshiva (Yiddish: מירער ישיבה), is a Haredi yeshiva located in Brooklyn, New York.

The teaching staff includes Rabbi Elya Brudny, who also sits on the Moetzes Gedolei HaTorah.

== History ==
See also Mir Yeshiva (Belarus)

The original Mirrer Yeshiva was founded in 1815 in Mir (now in Belarus), and remained in operation there until 1914. With the outbreak of World War I, the yeshiva moved to Poltava (now in Ukraine), under the leadership of Rabbi Eliezer Yehuda Finkel, son of the legendary Rabbi Nosson Tzvi Finkel (the Alter of Slabodka), and son-in-law of Rabbi Elya Boruch Kamai, his renowned predecessor. In 1921, the yeshiva moved back to its original facilities in Mir, where it remained until Nazi Germany invaded Poland in 1939 marking the beginning of the Holocaust. Although many of the foreign-born students left when the Soviet army invaded from the east, the yeshiva continued to operate, albeit on a reduced scale, until the approaching Nazi armies caused the leaders of the yeshiva to move the entire yeshiva community to Keidan, Lithuania. As the Nazi armies continued to push to the east, the yeshiva as a whole eventually fled across Siberia by train to the Far East, and finally reopened in Kobe, Japan, in 1941. Several smaller yeshivos managed to escape alongside the Mir, and, despite the difficulties involved, the overseers of the Mirrer yeshiva undertook full responsibility for their support, distributing funds and securing quarters and food for all the students. A short time later, the yeshiva relocated again, to (Japanese-controlled) Shanghai, China, where they remained until the end of World War II. The heroism of the Japanese consul-general in Lithuania, Chiune Sugihara, who issued several thousand transit visas to Jews, permitting them to travel in order to flee to Japan, has been the subject of several books.

Following the end of the war, the majority of the Jewish refugees from Shanghai ghetto left for Mandatory Palestine and the United States. Among them were the survivors from the Mir Yeshiva, who re-established the yeshiva, this time with two campuses, one in Jerusalem, Israel, and one in Brooklyn, New York.

== Brooklyn ==
The yeshiva settled in New Lots section of East New York before moving to their current location on Ocean Parkway in Flatbush. The rosh yeshiva was Rabbi Avraham Kalmanowitz, who led the yeshiva for almost 20 years. He died in 1964. His position of rosh yeshiva was filled by his son Rabbi Shraga Moshe Kalmanowitz and his son-in-law, Rabbi Shmuel Berenbaum. Rabbi Shraga Moshe died in 1998 and Rabbi Shmuel in 2008. Among the rabbis who taught at the yeshiva were Rabbi Dovid Kviat, author of the Sefer Sukkas Dovid, and Rabbi Shmuel Brudny.

Rabbi Moshe Handelsman was the longtime executive director of the yeshiva. He died in 2022 at the age 92.

The yeshiva is officially registered with the College Board as the Mirrer Yeshiva Central Institute. It is currently undergoing construction, building a new dormitory, a new beis midrash, and more.

== Notable faculty ==
The yeshiva's long-time Rosh Yeshiva was Rabbi Shmuel Berenbaum, who died on January 6, 2008. Rabbi Berenbaum was a son-in-law of the founder of the Brooklyn branch of the Mir Yeshiva, Rabbi Avraham Kalmanowitz. Mayor Michael Bloomberg issued a statement praising Berenbaum, noting that he built the Jewish academy "into one of the largest centers for Torah study in the world." Steven Bayme, national director of contemporary Jewish life at the American Jewish Congress said the yeshiva helped preserve "a world that was otherwise lost."

The yeshiva is currently led by Rabbi Avraham Yaakov Nelkenbaum, son-in-law of Rabbi Avraham Kalmanowitz; Rabbi Asher Eliyahu Kalmanowitz, son of Rabbi Shraga Moshe Kalmanowitz; Rabbi Hershel Zolty, son in law of Rabbi Shraga Moshe; and Rabbi Asher Dov Berenbaum, son of Rabbi Shmuel Berenbaum. The mashgiach is Rabbi Ezriel Erlanger. The yeshiva currently includes an elementary school, a high school, a beis midrash, and a kollel. The kollel is led by Rabbi Eliezer Ginsburg and the high school by a son-in-law of Rabbi Shraga Moshe Kalmanowitz.

== Notable alumni ==
- Samuel Belkin
- Yaakov Bender
- Abba Berman
- Zev Brenner
- Lazar Gulkowitsch
- Avraham Jacobovitz
- Meir Kahane
- Aryeh Kaplan
- Yisrael Mendel Kaplan
- Yaakov Luban
- Herman N. Neuberger
- Tovia Singer
- Pesach Stein
- Shraga Feivel Zimmerman
