= Yechiel Michel Feinstein =

Belarusian-born Israeli-American Haredi rabbi and rosh yeshiva

Rabbi Yechiel Michel Feinstein יחיאל מישל פיינשטיין
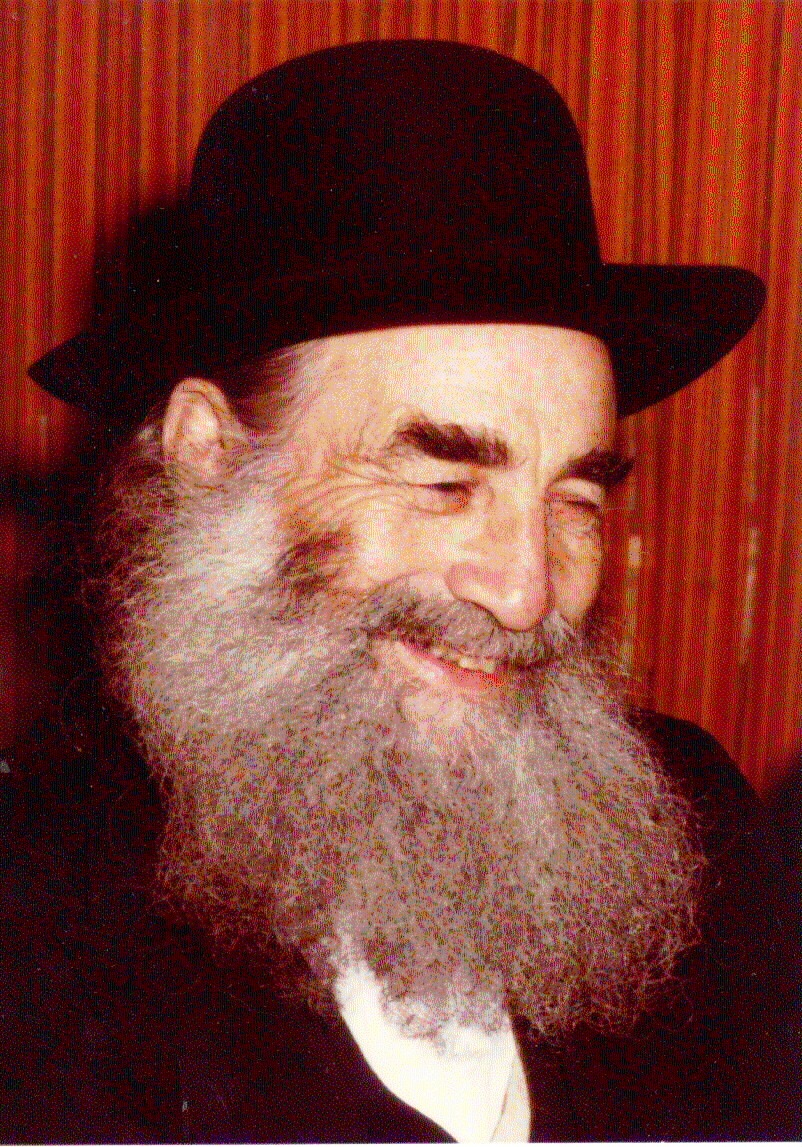
- 2014
- Title: Rosh Yeshiva, Beis Yehuda

Personal life
- Born: Yechiel Michel Feinstein; 27 June 1906 Uzda, Lithuania
- Died: 17 May 2003 (aged 96) Bnei Brak, Israel
- Buried: Har HaMenuchos
- Spouse: Lifsha Soloveitchik
- Children: at least 5
- Parent: Avrohom Yitzchok Feinstein (father)
- Education: Mir yeshiva (Poland)

Religious life
- Religion: Judaism
- Denomination: Orthodox

Jewish leader
- Predecessor: none
- Successor: Chaim Feinstein
- Yeshiva: Beis Yehuda
- Position: Rosh yeshiva (dean)
- Began: 1952
- Ended: 2003
- Residence: Bnei Brak, Israel

Yechiel Michel Feinstein (Hebrew: יחיאל מישל פיינשטיין; 27 June 1906 – 17 May 2003) was a haredi (ultra-orthodox Jewish) rabbi and rosh yeshiva (seminary dean) in Israel and the United States.

== Biography ==
Feinstein, the son of Avrohom Yitzchok Feinstein, was born in Uzda, Lithuania, then part of the Russian Empire. His father died when he was seven and he went to live with his grandfather, Dovid Feinstein, the rabbi of Starobin, Belarus. His uncle was Moshe Feinstein.

He went to Slutsk after his bar mitzvah to study under Isser Zalman Meltzer. When the Bolsheviks seized power Meltzer's yeshiva fled to Kletsk, Poland. During his three years in Kletsk, Feinstein attended the Talmudic lectures of Meltzer and his son-in-law, Aharon Kotler. Then he transferred to the Mir Yeshiva where he studied with Yeruchom Lebovitz

Feinstein studied in Brisk under Yitzchok Zev Soloveitchik. While there he became subject to conscription into the army, so he traveled to Grodno to obtain fake medical forms from a doctor and en route, consulted with Yisrael Meir Kagan (the Chofetz Chaim) in Radin about evading the draft. Feinstein stayed in Grodno for half a year, where he studied under Shimon Shkop. He then returned to Brisk to continue studying under Soloveitchik, spending the summer months at the Mir Yeshiva. When World War II broke out, he traveled to Vilna with other students from the Mir.

From Vilna Feinstein joined the Mir Yeshiva in exile in Japan. He arrived in the United States in 1941 with Aharon Kotler. Feinstein was mashgiach for Joseph B. Soloveitchik in Boston. Less than a year later he joined his uncle, Moshe Feinstein, as the head of Mesivtha Tifereth Jerusalem on the Lower East Side of Manhattan. He was appointed a member of the Agudas HaRabbonim and assisted the Vaad Hatzolah in rescuing Jews and aiding the war refugees in Europe.

== Israel ==
In 1946, Feinstein visited Palestine and in August married Lifsha, the daughter of his former teacher Soloveitchik, in Jerusalem. He returned to America and continued as rosh yeshiva until 1952, when he and his family immigrated to Israel and he established Yeshivas Beis Yehuda in Tel Aviv and served as its Rosh Yeshiva.

In 1973 after the death of one of his daughters Feinstein moved to Bnei Brak.

He died on the night of 17 May 2003 (16 Iyar 5763).

He is the author of Chiddushei Hagri”m Feinstein.

== Family tree ==
Brisker family tree

Rabbanit Esti Rosenberg, director of Migdal Oz (seminary)
Rabbi Yitzchok Lichtenstein, Co-Rosh Yeshiva of Yeshiva Torah Vodaas; Rabbi Bais Avrohom, Monsey, NY
Rabbi Yosef Dov (Reb Berel) Soloveichik	Rabbi Avrohom Yehoshua Soloveichik	Rabbi Mosheh Lichtenstein, Co-Rosh Yeshiva of Yeshivat Har Etzion
Rabbi Meshulam Dovid (Reb Dovid) Soloveichik	Rabbi Yitzchak Zev Soloveichik	Rabbi Mayer Lichtenstein, Rabbi Ohel Menachem Bet Shemesh
Rabbi Yosef Dov (HaLevi) Soloveichik author of Beis HaLevi	Rabbi Chaim Soloveichik "Reb Chaim Brisker"	Rabbi Yitzchak Zev (Reb Velvel) Soloveichik "The GRIZ"; The Brisker Rov	Lifsha Soloveitchik Feinstein	Dr. Tovah Soloveitchik Lichtenstein	Rabbi Jonathan Rosenblatt
Rabbi Refael Shapiro, Rosh Yeshiva of Volozhin yeshiva	Lifsha Shapiro	Rabbi Refoel Soloveichik	Rabbi Dr. Aharon Lichtenstein	Tzipporah Rosenblatt
Rabbi Meir Soloveichik	Dr. Atarah Soloveitchik Twersky	Rabbi Mosheh Twersky z"l, Maggid Shiur at Yeshiva Toras Moshe
Rabbi Dr. Joseph B. (Yosef Dov) Soloveitchik "The Rav"	Rabbi Dr. Isadore Twersky, Talner Rebbe of Boston	Rabbi Mayer Twersky, Rosh Yeshiva at Rabbi Isaac Elchanan Theological Seminary
Rabbi Moshe Soloveichik	Rabbi Ahron Soloveichik	Rabbi Dr. Haym Soloveitchik	Rabbi Moshe Soloveichik, Rosh Yeshivas Brisk (Chicago); Rav of Kehilas Beth Sholom Ahavas Achim
Peshka Feinstein Soloveichik	Dr. Samuel Soloveichik	Rabbi Eliyahu Soloveichik, Rosh Yeshiva at Lander College's Beis Medrash L'Talmud	Rabbi Meir Yaakov Soloveichik
Shulamit Soloveitchik Meiselman	Rabbi Moshe Meiselman, Rosh Yeshiva of Yeshiva Toras Moshe	Rabbi Yosef Soloveichik	Sarah Orenshein
Anne Soloveitchik Gerber	Rabbi Chayim Soloveichik, Maggid Shiur at Yeshivat Reishit; Morah D’Asrah of Kehillat Ohr Shalom, Ramat Beit Shemesh	Moshe Soloveichik
Rabbi Yosef Dov Soloveichik	Rabbi Shmuel Chaim Soloveichik
Rabbi Yitzchok Soloveichik	Rabbi Yisroel Soloveichik
Rabbi Yisroel Gershon Soloveichik	Rabbi Moshe Soloveichik	Rabbi Boruch Soloveichik
Rabbi Avraham Yeshaya Soloveichik
Daughter Soloveichik

Notes:
- Rabbi Chaim Halevi Soloveichik (the second)
