= Refael Shapiro =

Belarusian Orthodox rabbi, rosh yeshiva of Volozhin Yeshiva

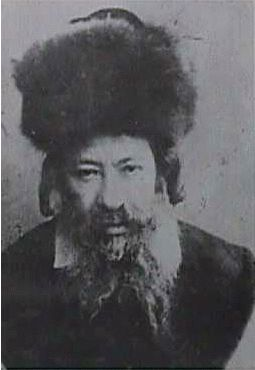
Rabbi Refael Shapiro

Rabbi Refael Shapiro (1837–1921) was the famed Rosh Yeshiva of the Volozhin yeshiva located in the town of Volozhin, Russia, (now Valozhyn, Belarus) and the Rabbi of the city.

== Biography ==
He was born in 1837, in Smorgon, to Rabbi Aryeh Leib Shapira, the rabbi of Kovna. In 1852, at the age of fifteen, he was chosen by Rabbi Naftali Tzvi Yehuda Berlin as a groom for his daughter Sarah Rasha. In1870, he was appointed as the deputy head of Volozhin Yeshiva alongside his father-in-law the Netziv, and began delivering lectures at the yeshiva three times a week. In1881, he relinquished his position in favor of his son-in-law Rabbi Chaim Soloveitchik of Brisk, and went to serve as rabbi of the community of Novo-Alexandrovsk in Lithuania.

In 1886, he moved to serve as rabbi of the community of Bobruisk in White Russia, present-day Belarus. In the year 1899, with the reopening of Volozhin Yeshiva through the efforts of the yeshiva's trustees in Vilna and Minsk and with the agreement of the leaders of Volozhin, R' Raphael was invited to serve as rabbi and head of Volozhin Yeshiva. Like all heads of Volozhin Yeshiva, R' Raphael added a special closing alongside his signature: "One who labors in the service of Torah in Volozhin."

Rabbi Shapiro ordained Rabbi Isser Yehuda Unterman (who would eventually become one of Israel's chief rabbis) who studied in the Kollel of the Volozhin yeshiva before opening his own yeshiva in the neighboring town of Vishnyeva (Vishnevo, Belarus). Additionally, Rabbi Shapiro gave Semicha (rabbinical ordination) to Rabbi Moshe Shatzkes, known as the , and Rabbi Meir Joshua Rosenberg.

In the year 1915, close to the outbreak of World War I, the yeshiva disbanded and R' Raphael relocated to Minsk, where he passed away on the March 2, 1921.

== Works ==
Torat Raphael - Novellae on Halacha and Explanations of the Words of the Talmud and the Halachic Decisors, 2 parts on the section Orach Chaim, and a 3rd part: a collection of responsa and compilations, Jerusalem 1943.

== Students ==
- Rabbi Isser Yehuda Unterman, the Chief Rabbi of Israel.
- Rabbi Moshe Shatzkes, the Łomża Rov,
- Rabbi Aryeh Levin, the prisoners' rabbi.
- Rabbi Naftali Tzvi Yehuda Rif (his grandson).
- Rabbi Meir Chaim Dolinko, rabbi of Motele.
- Rabbi Yehuda Leib Avida (Zlatnik), writer and researcher.
- Prof. Pinkhos Churgin, founder and president of Bar-Ilan University.
- Rav Aharon Reuven Charney, Rabbi of Bayonne, New Jersey and author of Sifrei Drush

== Family tree ==
Brisker family tree

Rabbanit Esti Rosenberg, director of Migdal Oz (seminary)
Rabbi Yitzchok Lichtenstein, Co-Rosh Yeshiva of Yeshiva Torah Vodaas; Rabbi Bais Avrohom, Monsey, NY
Rabbi Yosef Dov (Reb Berel) Soloveichik	Rabbi Avrohom Yehoshua Soloveichik	Rabbi Mosheh Lichtenstein, Co-Rosh Yeshiva of Yeshivat Har Etzion
Rabbi Meshulam Dovid (Reb Dovid) Soloveichik	Rabbi Yitzchak Zev Soloveichik	Rabbi Mayer Lichtenstein, Rabbi Ohel Menachem Bet Shemesh
Rabbi Yosef Dov (HaLevi) Soloveichik author of Beis HaLevi	Rabbi Chaim Soloveichik "Reb Chaim Brisker"	Rabbi Yitzchak Zev (Reb Velvel) Soloveichik "The GRIZ"; The Brisker Rov	Lifsha Soloveitchik Feinstein	Dr. Tovah Soloveitchik Lichtenstein	Rabbi Jonathan Rosenblatt
Rabbi Refael Shapiro, Rosh Yeshiva of Volozhin yeshiva	Lifsha Shapiro	Rabbi Refoel Soloveichik	Rabbi Dr. Aharon Lichtenstein	Tzipporah Rosenblatt
Rabbi Meir Soloveichik	Dr. Atarah Soloveitchik Twersky	Rabbi Mosheh Twersky z"l, Maggid Shiur at Yeshiva Toras Moshe
Rabbi Dr. Joseph B. (Yosef Dov) Soloveitchik "The Rav"	Rabbi Dr. Isadore Twersky, Talner Rebbe of Boston	Rabbi Mayer Twersky, Rosh Yeshiva at Rabbi Isaac Elchanan Theological Seminary
Rabbi Moshe Soloveichik	Rabbi Ahron Soloveichik	Rabbi Dr. Haym Soloveitchik	Rabbi Moshe Soloveichik, Rosh Yeshivas Brisk (Chicago); Rav of Kehilas Beth Sholom Ahavas Achim
Peshka Feinstein Soloveichik	Dr. Samuel Soloveichik	Rabbi Eliyahu Soloveichik, Rosh Yeshiva at Lander College's Beis Medrash L'Talmud	Rabbi Meir Yaakov Soloveichik
Shulamit Soloveitchik Meiselman	Rabbi Moshe Meiselman, Rosh Yeshiva of Yeshiva Toras Moshe	Rabbi Yosef Soloveichik	Sarah Orenshein
Anne Soloveitchik Gerber	Rabbi Chayim Soloveichik, Maggid Shiur at Yeshivat Reishit; Morah D’Asrah of Kehillat Ohr Shalom, Ramat Beit Shemesh	Moshe Soloveichik
Rabbi Yosef Dov Soloveichik	Rabbi Shmuel Chaim Soloveichik
Rabbi Yitzchok Soloveichik	Rabbi Yisroel Soloveichik
Rabbi Yisroel Gershon Soloveichik	Rabbi Moshe Soloveichik	Rabbi Boruch Soloveichik
Rabbi Avraham Yeshaya Soloveichik
Daughter Soloveichik

Notes:
- Rabbi Chaim Halevi Soloveichik (the second)
