= Mosheh Lichtenstein =

American-Israeli rosh yeshiva

Rabbi Mosheh Lichtenstein משה ליכטנשטיין
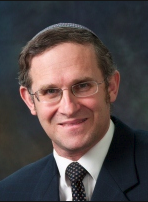
- Official picture of Rav Mosheh Lichtenstein

Personal life
- Born: July 7, 1961 (age 64)
- Spouse: Michal Lichtenstein
- Children: 3
- Parent(s): Aharon Lichtenstein, Tovah Lichtenstein
- Dynasty: Soloveitchik dynasty

Religious life
- Religion: Judaism
- Denomination: Orthodox Judaism
- Yeshiva: Yeshivat Har Etzion
- Position: Rosh Yeshiva, Rosh Kollel
- Residence: Alon Shevut
- Dynasty: Soloveitchik dynasty

Mosheh Lichtenstein (Hebrew: משה ליכטנשטיין; born July 7, 1961) is a co-rosh yeshiva of Yeshivat Har Etzion located in Alon Shvut. He is the eldest son of Rabbi Aharon Lichtenstein and Dr. Tovah Soloveitchik.

== Biography ==
Mosheh Lichtenstein came on Aliyah with his family in 1971 from New York, when his father Rav Aharon Lichtenstein was offered the position of Rosh Yeshiva at Yeshivat Har Etzion. He studied at the Netiv Meir High School in Jerusalem, and thereafter, spent a year studying with his grandfather, Rabbi Joseph B. Soloveitchik, in America from 1979 to 1980. From 1980 to 1985, he did hesder at Yeshivat Har Etzion, serving in the Armored Corps. He received Semicha from the Rabbanut and a degree in English Literature from Hebrew University. Lichtenstein was hired as a Ram at Yeshivat Har Etzion in 1992. He went on sabbatical during the 1997 and 1998 academic years and served as Rosh Kollel of the Torat Tzion Kollel in Cleveland. He also taught at Bruria, an Advanced Program for Women in Jerusalem from 1992 to 1997. At present, he is responsible for the Yeshivat Har Etzion's Kollel Gavoha, teaches Shiur Hei at Yeshivat Har Etzion, teaches an Iyun Shiur on Zevachim and gives a weekly Shiur for Shana Bet. He also teaches at the Beit Midrash for Women Migdal Oz. On September 25, 2008 (Tishrei 5769), Rav Yehuda Amital officially announced his retirement, to take effect on the last day of the Jewish month of Tishrei, in the year 5769 (October 28, 2008). He also announced that Lichtenstein would assume the position as the fourth Rosh Yeshiva on that same day. Lichtenstein was inaugurated as Rosh Yeshiva alongside Rabbis Aharon Lichtenstein, Yaakov Medan and Baruch Gigi.

In June 2026, Rabbi Mosheh Lichtenstein took part in a panel discussion in London with Dayan Eliezer Zobin, a leading rabbinic intellectual voice in the UK, which addressed extremism, Israel-Diaspora relations, and interfaith dialogue.

== Personal ==
Lichtenstein is married to Dr. Michal Lichtenstein (née Mintzer). They reside in Alon Shevut, where the Yeshiva is located, and have three daughters.

== Works ==
- Moses - Envoy of God, Envoy of His People : leadership and crisis from the Exodus to the plains of Moab
- "What" Hath Brisk Wrought: The Brisker Derekh Revisited The Torah U-Madda Journal, No. 9 (2000)
- Kol Isha: A Women's Voice, Tradition Vol. 46, No. 1 (2013)
- Netivei Nevuah - Mabat El Hahaftarot (Paths of prophecy : An analysis of the haftarot (Hebrew)) (2015)

== Family Tree ==
Brisker family tree

Rabbanit Esti Rosenberg, director of Migdal Oz (seminary)
Rabbi Yitzchok Lichtenstein, Co-Rosh Yeshiva of Yeshiva Torah Vodaas; Rabbi Bais Avrohom, Monsey, NY
Rabbi Yosef Dov (Reb Berel) Soloveichik	Rabbi Avrohom Yehoshua Soloveichik	Rabbi Mosheh Lichtenstein, Co-Rosh Yeshiva of Yeshivat Har Etzion
Rabbi Meshulam Dovid (Reb Dovid) Soloveichik	Rabbi Yitzchak Zev Soloveichik	Rabbi Mayer Lichtenstein, Rabbi Ohel Menachem Bet Shemesh
Rabbi Yosef Dov (HaLevi) Soloveichik author of Beis HaLevi	Rabbi Chaim Soloveichik "Reb Chaim Brisker"	Rabbi Yitzchak Zev (Reb Velvel) Soloveichik "The GRIZ"; The Brisker Rov	Lifsha Soloveitchik Feinstein	Dr. Tovah Soloveitchik Lichtenstein	Rabbi Jonathan Rosenblatt
Rabbi Refael Shapiro, Rosh Yeshiva of Volozhin yeshiva	Lifsha Shapiro	Rabbi Refoel Soloveichik	Rabbi Dr. Aharon Lichtenstein	Tzipporah Rosenblatt
Rabbi Meir Soloveichik	Dr. Atarah Soloveitchik Twersky	Rabbi Mosheh Twersky z"l, Maggid Shiur at Yeshiva Toras Moshe
Rabbi Dr. Joseph B. (Yosef Dov) Soloveitchik "The Rav"	Rabbi Dr. Isadore Twersky, Talner Rebbe of Boston	Rabbi Mayer Twersky, Rosh Yeshiva at Rabbi Isaac Elchanan Theological Seminary
Rabbi Moshe Soloveichik	Rabbi Ahron Soloveichik	Rabbi Dr. Haym Soloveitchik	Rabbi Moshe Soloveichik, Rosh Yeshivas Brisk (Chicago); Rav of Kehilas Beth Sholom Ahavas Achim
Peshka Feinstein Soloveichik	Dr. Samuel Soloveichik	Rabbi Eliyahu Soloveichik, Rosh Yeshiva at Lander College's Beis Medrash L'Talmud	Rabbi Meir Yaakov Soloveichik
Shulamit Soloveitchik Meiselman	Rabbi Moshe Meiselman, Rosh Yeshiva of Yeshiva Toras Moshe	Rabbi Yosef Soloveichik	Sarah Orenshein
Anne Soloveitchik Gerber	Rabbi Chayim Soloveichik, Maggid Shiur at Yeshivat Reishit; Morah D’Asrah of Kehillat Ohr Shalom, Ramat Beit Shemesh	Moshe Soloveichik
Rabbi Yosef Dov Soloveichik	Rabbi Shmuel Chaim Soloveichik
Rabbi Yitzchok Soloveichik	Rabbi Yisroel Soloveichik
Rabbi Yisroel Gershon Soloveichik	Rabbi Moshe Soloveichik	Rabbi Boruch Soloveichik
Rabbi Avraham Yeshaya Soloveichik
Daughter Soloveichik

Notes:
- Rabbi Chaim Halevi Soloveichik (the second)
