= Moshe Soloveitchik (Zürich) =

Haredi rabbi

Rabbi Moshe Mordechai Soloveitchik
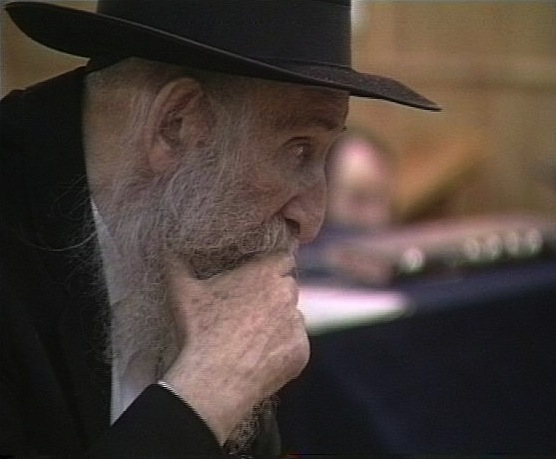

Personal life
- Born: September 21, 1914 Minsk, Russian Empire present-day Belarus
- Died: May 18, 1995 (aged 80) Zürich, Switzerland
- Buried: Jerusalem, Israel
- Spouse: Rivka Ruchama Soloveitchik née Neuman
- Parent: Yisroel Gershon Soloveichik (father)
- Dynasty: Soloveitchik dynasty

Religious life
- Religion: Judaism
- Denomination: Haredi

Jewish leader
- Successor: Rabbi Dov Koppelman
- Yeshiva: Lucerne Yeshiva
- Position: Rosh Yeshiva
- Yahrtzeit: 18 Iyar
- Dynasty: Soloveitchik dynasty

Rabbi Moshe Mordechai Soloveitchik, also known as the Swiss Gadol, was a prominent Haredi rabbi who lived in Switzerland. He served as a rosh yeshiva in Lugano and Lucerne before moving to Zürich, where he was recognized as one of the leaders of European Jewry.

== Early life ==
Poster displaying the faces of students and teachers of Yeshiva Toras Chesed of Brisk

Rabbi Soloveitchik was born on September 21, 1914 (the second day of Rosh Hashanah). He was the son of Rabbi Yisroel Gershon Soloveichik and grandson of Rabbi Chaim Soloveichik. Growing up in Brisk, Moshe was friends with Aharon Leib Shteinman (who years later would be recognized as the Gadol Hador). They both attended Yeshivas Toras Chesed of Brisk, which was led by Rabbi Moshe Sokolovski [HE], author of the Imrei Moshe. After Sokolovski died in 1931 without any children, a dispute erupted in the yeshiva over who should succeed him. Moshe and Aharon Leib both left the yeshiva at that point because of the internal strife, Aharon Leib to Yeshivas Eitz Chaim in Kletsk and Moshe to Yeshivas Knesses Beis Yitzchak in Kamyanyets.

=== Escape to Switzerland ===
Among the yeshiva students, there was a threat of being drafted into the Polish army, although many were exempted as they were too weak to fight. However, both Moshe and Aharon Leib were called to report to the army, and they tried hard to obtain exemptions, eating and drinking little to weaken them and taking long walks to help them lose weight. While their efforts postponed the draft, they were put on a waiting list for the future if more troops were needed. To escape this possibility, in 1937, the two went to Montreaux, Switzerland, Aharon Leib first and Moshe a few months after, where they joined the yeshiva of Rabbi Eliyahu Botchko as teachers. Aryeh Leib Glickson, Moshe's cousin (his mother Sara was the only daughter of Rabbi Chaim Soloveitchik), joined the yeshiva as well a short time after, as he too was avoiding the draft.

In 1940, the Swiss government, suspecting them of espionage, interred 300 Jewish refugees in a resort-turned-labor camp near Basel called Schonburg, where they were forced to lay railroad tracks. Moshe and Aharon Leib were among the 40 Orthodox Jews in this group. They studied together from memory, with one reciting a passage of Gemara and the other responding with the corresponding commentary of Tosafos. They did however have one volume of Mishne Torah in their possession.

=== Lomza Yeshiva ===
At some point, Moshe was discharged from the labor camp and soon traveled to Mandatory Palestine and joined the Lomza Yeshiva of Rabbi Yechiel Mordechai Gordon in Petah Tikvah. During his years there, he built a relationship with Rabbi Avraham Yeshaya Karelitz, (the Chazon Ish).

In 1948/1949, Moshe returned to Switzerland where he married the daughter of Rabbi Shmuel Zanvil Neuman of Lugano.

== Rabbinic career ==
After his marriage, Rabbi Soloveitchik settled in Lugano where he became a Rosh yeshiva. Several years later, he moved to Lucerne and established a yeshiva there where he tried to instill in his students a commitment to Torah and Yiras Shamayim (fear of Heaven).

In 1963, he moved to Zürich where he didn't accept any official position, although he became recognized as one of the leaders of Europe's Haredi community. Throughout the day and night, people came to him with their questions. After the dissolution of the Soviet Union, he worked to establish Yeshivat Torat Chaim in Moscow [HE] to bring unaffiliated Jews back to Judaism (this is known as kiruv).

On May 18, 1995, after several months of illness, Rabbi Soloveitchik died in Zürich at the age of 80, and he was buried in Jerusalem.

== Family tree ==
Brisker family tree

Rabbanit Esti Rosenberg, director of Migdal Oz (seminary)
Rabbi Yitzchok Lichtenstein, Co-Rosh Yeshiva of Yeshiva Torah Vodaas; Rabbi Bais Avrohom, Monsey, NY
Rabbi Yosef Dov (Reb Berel) Soloveichik	Rabbi Avrohom Yehoshua Soloveichik	Rabbi Mosheh Lichtenstein, Co-Rosh Yeshiva of Yeshivat Har Etzion
Rabbi Meshulam Dovid (Reb Dovid) Soloveichik	Rabbi Yitzchak Zev Soloveichik	Rabbi Mayer Lichtenstein, Rabbi Ohel Menachem Bet Shemesh
Rabbi Yosef Dov (HaLevi) Soloveichik author of Beis HaLevi	Rabbi Chaim Soloveichik "Reb Chaim Brisker"	Rabbi Yitzchak Zev (Reb Velvel) Soloveichik "The GRIZ"; The Brisker Rov	Lifsha Soloveitchik Feinstein	Dr. Tovah Soloveitchik Lichtenstein	Rabbi Jonathan Rosenblatt
Rabbi Refael Shapiro, Rosh Yeshiva of Volozhin yeshiva	Lifsha Shapiro	Rabbi Refoel Soloveichik	Rabbi Dr. Aharon Lichtenstein	Tzipporah Rosenblatt
Rabbi Meir Soloveichik	Dr. Atarah Soloveitchik Twersky	Rabbi Mosheh Twersky z"l, Maggid Shiur at Yeshiva Toras Moshe
Rabbi Dr. Joseph B. (Yosef Dov) Soloveitchik "The Rav"	Rabbi Dr. Isadore Twersky, Talner Rebbe of Boston	Rabbi Mayer Twersky, Rosh Yeshiva at Rabbi Isaac Elchanan Theological Seminary
Rabbi Moshe Soloveichik	Rabbi Ahron Soloveichik	Rabbi Dr. Haym Soloveitchik	Rabbi Moshe Soloveichik, Rosh Yeshivas Brisk (Chicago); Rav of Kehilas Beth Sholom Ahavas Achim
Peshka Feinstein Soloveichik	Dr. Samuel Soloveichik	Rabbi Eliyahu Soloveichik, Rosh Yeshiva at Lander College's Beis Medrash L'Talmud	Rabbi Meir Yaakov Soloveichik
Shulamit Soloveitchik Meiselman	Rabbi Moshe Meiselman, Rosh Yeshiva of Yeshiva Toras Moshe	Rabbi Yosef Soloveichik	Sarah Orenshein
Anne Soloveitchik Gerber	Rabbi Chayim Soloveichik, Maggid Shiur at Yeshivat Reishit; Morah D’Asrah of Kehillat Ohr Shalom, Ramat Beit Shemesh	Moshe Soloveichik
Rabbi Yosef Dov Soloveichik	Rabbi Shmuel Chaim Soloveichik
Rabbi Yitzchok Soloveichik	Rabbi Yisroel Soloveichik
Rabbi Yisroel Gershon Soloveichik	Rabbi Moshe Soloveichik	Rabbi Boruch Soloveichik
Rabbi Avraham Yeshaya Soloveichik
Daughter Soloveichik

Notes:
- Rabbi Chaim Halevi Soloveichik (the second)

== See also ==
- Meshulam Dovid Soloveitchik, rabbi
