= Mayer Twersky =

Rabbi Mayer E. Twersky

Rosh yeshiva at Rabbi Isaac Elchanan Theological Seminary

Personal details
- Born: October 17, 1960 (age 66)
- Occupation: Rabbi, Rosh yeshiva

Mayer E. Twersky (born October 17, 1960) is an Orthodox rabbi and one of the roshei yeshiva at the Rabbi Isaac Elchanan Theological Seminary (RIETS) of Yeshiva University. He holds the Leib Merkin Distinguished Professorial Chair in Talmud and Jewish Philosophy.

Twersky is from the chassidic dynasty of Chernobyl and is the younger son of Isadore Twersky. His brother, Mosheh Twersky, was murdered in the 2014 Jerusalem synagogue massacre. He is a 5th cousin of Rabbi Abraham J. Twerski. Other cousins include the Grand Rabbis of Chernobyl. He is also a grandson of Rabbi Joseph B. Soloveitchik.

Twersky attended the Maimonides School, which his grandfather founded, through high school. He then attended Harvard College, while studying Talmud privately with his grandfather. Following college, he studied for rabbinic ordination at RIETS. He eventually became a teacher in the Yeshiva University High School for Boys and later a lecturer in RIETS.

He has written articles in Hebrew for RIETS's annual Torah journal, and English articles in Tradition and in the Orthodox Union's magazine Jewish Action on subjects introducing the place of women in contemporary Orthodox Judaism.

As of 2011 Twersky was on the board of the website TorahWeb, which frequently publishes his short English articles.

The current shamash of the Rebbe is Sam Hilbert. Hilbert spent two years studying in Yeshivat Sha'alvim before coming to Yeshiva University and serving as the Rebbe's shamash. Past shamashim include Yoni Besser, Daniel Goldstein, Yair Caplan, Jonah Steinmetz, Etan Schnall, Yitzi Genack, and Yosef Schwartz.

Brisker family tree

Rabbanit Esti Rosenberg, director of Migdal Oz (seminary)
Rabbi Yitzchok Lichtenstein, Co-Rosh Yeshiva of Yeshiva Torah Vodaas; Rabbi Bais Avrohom, Monsey, NY
Rabbi Yosef Dov (Reb Berel) Soloveichik	Rabbi Avrohom Yehoshua Soloveichik	Rabbi Mosheh Lichtenstein, Co-Rosh Yeshiva of Yeshivat Har Etzion
Rabbi Meshulam Dovid (Reb Dovid) Soloveichik	Rabbi Yitzchak Zev Soloveichik	Rabbi Mayer Lichtenstein, Rabbi Ohel Menachem Bet Shemesh
Rabbi Yosef Dov (HaLevi) Soloveichik author of Beis HaLevi	Rabbi Chaim Soloveichik "Reb Chaim Brisker"	Rabbi Yitzchak Zev (Reb Velvel) Soloveichik "The GRIZ"; The Brisker Rov	Lifsha Soloveitchik Feinstein	Dr. Tovah Soloveitchik Lichtenstein	Rabbi Jonathan Rosenblatt
Rabbi Refael Shapiro, Rosh Yeshiva of Volozhin yeshiva	Lifsha Shapiro	Rabbi Refoel Soloveichik	Rabbi Dr. Aharon Lichtenstein	Tzipporah Rosenblatt
Rabbi Meir Soloveichik	Dr. Atarah Soloveitchik Twersky	Rabbi Mosheh Twersky z"l, Maggid Shiur at Yeshiva Toras Moshe
Rabbi Dr. Joseph B. (Yosef Dov) Soloveitchik "The Rav"	Rabbi Dr. Isadore Twersky, Talner Rebbe of Boston	Rabbi Mayer Twersky, Rosh Yeshiva at Rabbi Isaac Elchanan Theological Seminary
Rabbi Moshe Soloveichik	Rabbi Ahron Soloveichik	Rabbi Dr. Haym Soloveitchik	Rabbi Moshe Soloveichik, Rosh Yeshivas Brisk (Chicago); Rav of Kehilas Beth Sholom Ahavas Achim
Peshka Feinstein Soloveichik	Dr. Samuel Soloveichik	Rabbi Eliyahu Soloveichik, Rosh Yeshiva at Lander College's Beis Medrash L'Talmud	Rabbi Meir Yaakov Soloveichik
Shulamit Soloveitchik Meiselman	Rabbi Moshe Meiselman, Rosh Yeshiva of Yeshiva Toras Moshe	Rabbi Yosef Soloveichik	Sarah Orenshein
Anne Soloveitchik Gerber	Rabbi Chayim Soloveichik, Maggid Shiur at Yeshivat Reishit; Morah D’Asrah of Kehillat Ohr Shalom, Ramat Beit Shemesh	Moshe Soloveichik
Rabbi Yosef Dov Soloveichik	Rabbi Shmuel Chaim Soloveichik
Rabbi Yitzchok Soloveichik	Rabbi Yisroel Soloveichik
Rabbi Yisroel Gershon Soloveichik	Rabbi Moshe Soloveichik	Rabbi Boruch Soloveichik
Rabbi Avraham Yeshaya Soloveichik
Daughter Soloveichik

Notes:
- Rabbi Chaim Halevi Soloveichik (the second)

== Online speeches and articles ==
- TorahWeb.org Articles by Twersky
