= Yosef Dov Soloveitchik (Beis Halevi) =

Russian Rabbi, first of Brisk dynasty

Rabbi Yosef Dov Soloveitchik
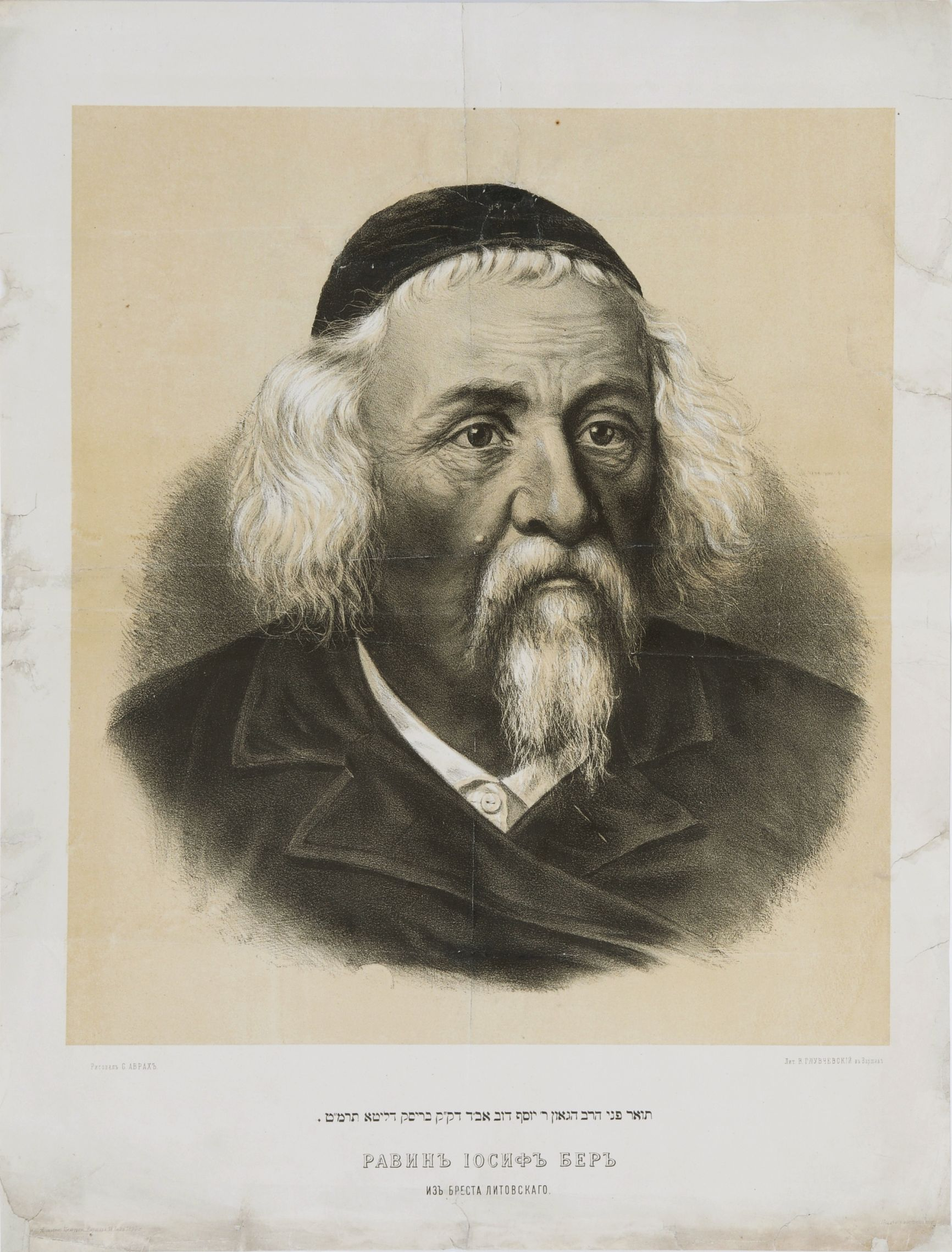

Personal life
- Born: 1820 Nesvizh, Minsk Governorate, Russian Empire
- Died: 1 May 1892 (aged 71–72) Brest-Litovsk, Grodno Governorate, Russian Empire
- Buried: Brest, Belarus
- Children: Chaim Soloveitchik
- Dynasty: Soloveitchik dynasty

Religious life
- Religion: Judaism
- Denomination: Orthodox Judaism

Jewish leader
- Yahrtzeit: 4 Iyar 5652
- Dynasty: Soloveitchik dynasty

Yosef Dov (Note: Soleveitchik signed his own name "יוסף דובער", "Yosef Dovber", a common tautological name combining "Dov" and its Yiddish equivalent "Ber".) Soloveitchik (1820 – 1 May 1892) was the author of Beis Halevi, by which name he is better known among Talmudic scholars. He was the great-grandson of Chaim Volozhin.

== Early years ==
Yosef Dov Soloveitchik was born to Rivka, a granddaughter of Chaim Volozhin. His father was Yitschok Ze'ev.

== Rosh yeshiva ==
Soloveitchik was reputed to have one of the great minds of his time. In 1854, he was considered a candidate for rosh yeshiva of Volozhin yeshiva, over Naftali Zvi Yehuda Berlin (the Netziv). Ultimately, Berlin would be selected for the position, with Soloveitchik becoming his assistant. Together, they led the yeshiva until 1865.

== Rabbinate ==
In 1865, Soloveitchik became rabbi of Slutsk.

He was a fierce opponent of the Maskilim, as a result of which he left Slutsk in 1874. He then moved to Warsaw where he lived in poverty. When the rabbi of Brisk, Yehoshua Leib Diskin left for the Land of Israel in 1877, Soloveitchik was offered the rabbinate of Brisk.

== Works ==
Soloveitchik composed works on Jewish law (responsa) called Shu"t Beis Halevi, as well as a commentary on the first book and part of the second book of the Bible (Beis Halevi al Hatorah).

== Family tree ==
Brisker family tree

Rabbanit Esti Rosenberg, director of Migdal Oz (seminary)
Rabbi Yitzchok Lichtenstein, Co-Rosh Yeshiva of Yeshiva Torah Vodaas; Rabbi Bais Avrohom, Monsey, NY
Rabbi Yosef Dov (Reb Berel) Soloveichik	Rabbi Avrohom Yehoshua Soloveichik	Rabbi Mosheh Lichtenstein, Co-Rosh Yeshiva of Yeshivat Har Etzion
Rabbi Meshulam Dovid (Reb Dovid) Soloveichik	Rabbi Yitzchak Zev Soloveichik	Rabbi Mayer Lichtenstein, Rabbi Ohel Menachem Bet Shemesh
Rabbi Yosef Dov (HaLevi) Soloveichik author of Beis HaLevi	Rabbi Chaim Soloveichik "Reb Chaim Brisker"	Rabbi Yitzchak Zev (Reb Velvel) Soloveichik "The GRIZ"; The Brisker Rov	Lifsha Soloveitchik Feinstein	Dr. Tovah Soloveitchik Lichtenstein	Rabbi Jonathan Rosenblatt
Rabbi Refael Shapiro, Rosh Yeshiva of Volozhin yeshiva	Lifsha Shapiro	Rabbi Refoel Soloveichik	Rabbi Dr. Aharon Lichtenstein	Tzipporah Rosenblatt
Rabbi Meir Soloveichik	Dr. Atarah Soloveitchik Twersky	Rabbi Mosheh Twersky z"l, Maggid Shiur at Yeshiva Toras Moshe
Rabbi Dr. Joseph B. (Yosef Dov) Soloveitchik "The Rav"	Rabbi Dr. Isadore Twersky, Talner Rebbe of Boston	Rabbi Mayer Twersky, Rosh Yeshiva at Rabbi Isaac Elchanan Theological Seminary
Rabbi Moshe Soloveichik	Rabbi Ahron Soloveichik	Rabbi Dr. Haym Soloveitchik	Rabbi Moshe Soloveichik, Rosh Yeshivas Brisk (Chicago); Rav of Kehilas Beth Sholom Ahavas Achim
Peshka Feinstein Soloveichik	Dr. Samuel Soloveichik	Rabbi Eliyahu Soloveichik, Rosh Yeshiva at Lander College's Beis Medrash L'Talmud	Rabbi Meir Yaakov Soloveichik
Shulamit Soloveitchik Meiselman	Rabbi Moshe Meiselman, Rosh Yeshiva of Yeshiva Toras Moshe	Rabbi Yosef Soloveichik	Sarah Orenshein
Anne Soloveitchik Gerber	Rabbi Chayim Soloveichik, Maggid Shiur at Yeshivat Reishit; Morah D’Asrah of Kehillat Ohr Shalom, Ramat Beit Shemesh	Moshe Soloveichik
Rabbi Yosef Dov Soloveichik	Rabbi Shmuel Chaim Soloveichik
Rabbi Yitzchok Soloveichik	Rabbi Yisroel Soloveichik
Rabbi Yisroel Gershon Soloveichik	Rabbi Moshe Soloveichik	Rabbi Boruch Soloveichik
Rabbi Avraham Yeshaya Soloveichik
Daughter Soloveichik

Notes:
- Rabbi Chaim Halevi Soloveichik (the second)

Soloveitchik was the great-grandfather of the eponymous Joseph B. Soloveitchik and another descendant, Berel Soloveitchik who moved to Israel, both of whom are also known as "Yosef Dov Soloveitchik."

== See also ==
- Brisk yeshivas and methods.
