= Yitzchok Lichtenstein =

Israeli-American Orthodox rabbi

Rabbi Yitzchok Lichtenstein
- יצחק אבא ליכטנשטיין
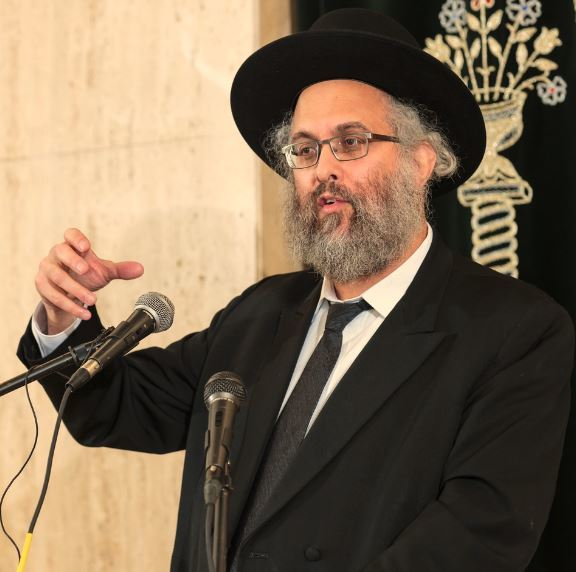

Personal life
- Born: December 1962 (age 63)
- Spouse: Rochel Grozovsky
- Parent(s): Aharon Lichtenstein, Tovah Lichtenstein
- Dynasty: Soloveitchik dynasty

Religious life
- Religion: Judaism
- Denomination: Orthodox Judaism
- Yeshiva: Yeshiva Torah Vodaas
- Position: Rosh Yeshiva
- Residence: Monsey, New York
- Dynasty: Soloveitchik dynasty
- Semikhah: Rabbi Isaac Elchanan Theological Seminary

Yitzchok (Yitzchak) Abba Lichtenstein (Hebrew: יצחק אבא ליכטנשטיין; born December 1962) is an Israeli-American Orthodox rabbi who is a co-rosh yeshiva of Yeshiva Torah Vodaas located in Brooklyn, New York and the former Mara d'asra of Kehillas Bais Avrohom in Monsey. He is a major editor for the writings of Rabbis Chaim Soloveitchik, Moshe Soloveichik and Joseph B. Soloveitchik. He is the second son of Rav Aharon Lichtenstein and Dr. Tovah Soloveitchik.

== Biography ==
Yitzchok Lichtenstein went on Aliyah with his family in 1971 from New York, when his father Aharon Lichtenstein was offered the position of Rosh Yeshiva at Yeshivat Har Etzion. He studied at the Netiv Meir High School in Jerusalem. He received Semicha at Yeshiva University in 1983, where he studied under his grandfather, Rabbi Joseph B. Soloveitchik. He also studied in the Lakewood Yeshiva and the Brisk Yeshiva in Jerusalem, where he was a student of Rabbi Meshulam Dovid Soloveitchik, his grandfather's first-cousin.

Lichtenstein was appointed the Rosh Yeshiva of Yeshivat Nesivos HaTorah in Staten Island and succeeding Rabbi Avrohom Chain Feuer as the Mara D'asra of the Kehilas Bais Avraham congregation in Monsey. He taught at the Orchos Chaim yeshiva in Monsey, the "Agra D’Pirka" yeshiva, the Bialystoker shul, and various other venues.

After two of its four previous Roshei Yeshiva, Avrohom Pam and Yisroel Belsky, had died, Yeshiva Torah Vodaas began a search for a new Rosh Yeshiva. In October 2018, Lichtenstein was appointed Rosh Yeshiva of Yeshiva Torah Vodaas, alongside the incumbent Roshei Yeshiva, Yosef Savitsky and Yisroel Reisman. Lichtenstein's family has a history among the roshei yeshiva of Torah Vodaath; his wife is a granddaughter of Refael Reuvain Grozovsky, who was Rosh Yeshiva of Torah Vodaath in the 1950s.

Lichtenstein is a publisher of the writings of his ancestors Chaim Soloveitchik, Moshe Soloveichik and Joseph Ber Soloveitchik.

== Personal life ==
Lichtenstein is married to Rochel Grozovsky, the granddaughter of Reuven Grozovsky, former Rosh Yeshiva of Yeshiva Torah Vodaas and son-in-law of Boruch Ber Leibowitz.

== Published works ==
- Shiurei Rabbeinu Chaim HaLevi: Bava Kama, Bava Matzia, Bava Batra - Notes on his Shiurim from the Volozhin Yeshiva; together with his relative, Moshe Halevi Meiselman
- Kitvei Rabbeinu Chaim HaLevi: Shas and Rambam
- Haggadah Shel Pesach: Si'ach HaGri"d
- Chiddushei HaGra"m VeHaGri"d
- Chiddushei HaGra"m VeHaGri"d – Inyanei Kodshim
- Chiddushei HaGra"m HaLevi: Chiddushim U'Beurim Lefi Seder HaRambam

== Family tree ==
Brisker family tree

Rabbanit Esti Rosenberg, director of Migdal Oz (seminary)
Rabbi Yitzchok Lichtenstein, Co-Rosh Yeshiva of Yeshiva Torah Vodaas; Rabbi Bais Avrohom, Monsey, NY
Rabbi Yosef Dov (Reb Berel) Soloveichik	Rabbi Avrohom Yehoshua Soloveichik	Rabbi Mosheh Lichtenstein, Co-Rosh Yeshiva of Yeshivat Har Etzion
Rabbi Meshulam Dovid (Reb Dovid) Soloveichik	Rabbi Yitzchak Zev Soloveichik	Rabbi Mayer Lichtenstein, Rabbi Ohel Menachem Bet Shemesh
Rabbi Yosef Dov (HaLevi) Soloveichik author of Beis HaLevi	Rabbi Chaim Soloveichik "Reb Chaim Brisker"	Rabbi Yitzchak Zev (Reb Velvel) Soloveichik "The GRIZ"; The Brisker Rov	Lifsha Soloveitchik Feinstein	Dr. Tovah Soloveitchik Lichtenstein	Rabbi Jonathan Rosenblatt
Rabbi Refael Shapiro, Rosh Yeshiva of Volozhin yeshiva	Lifsha Shapiro	Rabbi Refoel Soloveichik	Rabbi Dr. Aharon Lichtenstein	Tzipporah Rosenblatt
Rabbi Meir Soloveichik	Dr. Atarah Soloveitchik Twersky	Rabbi Mosheh Twersky z"l, Maggid Shiur at Yeshiva Toras Moshe
Rabbi Dr. Joseph B. (Yosef Dov) Soloveitchik "The Rav"	Rabbi Dr. Isadore Twersky, Talner Rebbe of Boston	Rabbi Mayer Twersky, Rosh Yeshiva at Rabbi Isaac Elchanan Theological Seminary
Rabbi Moshe Soloveichik	Rabbi Ahron Soloveichik	Rabbi Dr. Haym Soloveitchik	Rabbi Moshe Soloveichik, Rosh Yeshivas Brisk (Chicago); Rav of Kehilas Beth Sholom Ahavas Achim
Peshka Feinstein Soloveichik	Dr. Samuel Soloveichik	Rabbi Eliyahu Soloveichik, Rosh Yeshiva at Lander College's Beis Medrash L'Talmud	Rabbi Meir Yaakov Soloveichik
Shulamit Soloveitchik Meiselman	Rabbi Moshe Meiselman, Rosh Yeshiva of Yeshiva Toras Moshe	Rabbi Yosef Soloveichik	Sarah Orenshein
Anne Soloveitchik Gerber	Rabbi Chayim Soloveichik, Maggid Shiur at Yeshivat Reishit; Morah D’Asrah of Kehillat Ohr Shalom, Ramat Beit Shemesh	Moshe Soloveichik
Rabbi Yosef Dov Soloveichik	Rabbi Shmuel Chaim Soloveichik
Rabbi Yitzchok Soloveichik	Rabbi Yisroel Soloveichik
Rabbi Yisroel Gershon Soloveichik	Rabbi Moshe Soloveichik	Rabbi Boruch Soloveichik
Rabbi Avraham Yeshaya Soloveichik
Daughter Soloveichik

Notes:
- Rabbi Chaim Halevi Soloveichik (the second)
