= Meshulam Dovid Soloveitchik =

Israeli rabbi (1921–2021)

Rabbi Dovid Soloveitchik דוד סולובייצ'יק
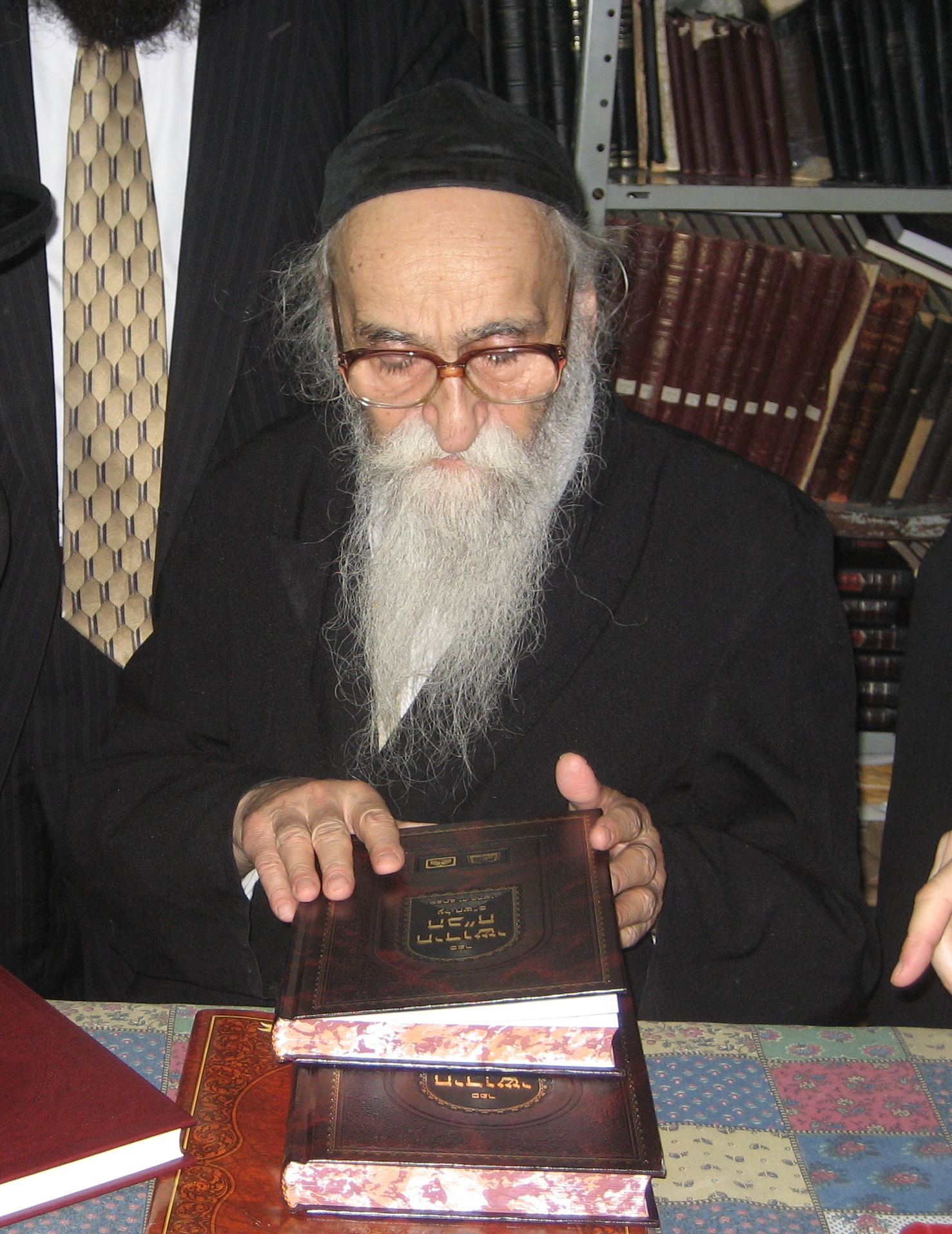
- Title: Rosh Yeshivas Brisk

Personal life
- Born: Meshulam Dovid Soloveitchik; 21 October 1921 Brześć, Poland
- Died: 31 January 2021 (aged 99) Jerusalem, Israel
- Buried: Har Hamenuchot
- Spouse: Yehudis Shternbuch
- Children: Yitzchok Zev Soloveitchik (II) (Reb Velvel); Asher Soloveitchik; Hendel Kaplan
- Parent(s): Yitzchok Zev Soloveitchik and Alte Hindl Auerbach
- Dynasty: Soloveitchik

Religious life
- Religion: Judaism
- Denomination: Haredi

Jewish leader
- Predecessor: Yitzchok Zev Soloveitchik
- Successor: Reb Yitzchok Zev Soloveitchik (II) (Reb Velvel)
- Position: Rosh yeshiva
- Yeshiva: Brisk Yeshiva, Jerusalem
- Began: 12 October 1959
- Ended: 31 January 2021
- Residence: Jerusalem
- Dynasty: Soloveitchik

Meshulam Dovid Soloveitchik (Hebrew: משולם דוד סולובייצ'יק also known as Reb Dovid or Rav Dovid; 21 October 1921 – 31 January 2021) was a Haredi rabbi and rosh yeshiva of one of the branches of the Brisk yeshivas in Jerusalem.

== Early life ==
Meshulam Dovid Soloveitchik was the fifth of twelve children and the third son born to Yitzchok Zev Soloveitchik and Alte Hindl, daughter of Chaim Auerbach (not to be confused with Chaim Yehuda Leib Auerbach). His exact date of birth is unknown: some sources state his birth on 19 Tishrei 5682 which would be 21 October 1921, while others say he was born in 1922. He was named "Meshulam" after his maternal great grandfather, Meshulam Auerbach (who had also proposed the shidduch between his parents), and "Dovid" after his maternal grandmother's second husband, Dovid Mintz. Growing up in Brest-Litovsk (Brisk) where his father served as rabbi, he attended the local Talmud Torah, Mekor Chaim, but at the age of twelve, his father recognized that he was too advanced for the Talmud Torah and sent him to study in Yeshiva Toras Chesed, a yeshiva for older students led by Moshe Sokolovski.

Soloveitchik learned in the Kamenitz Yeshiva under Boruch Ber Leibovitz. At age 19, Soloveitchik emigrated to Mandatory Palestine with his father during World War II, and they settled in Jerusalem. He married Yehudis the daughter of Asher Sternbuch of London. He was the brother-in-law of Moshe Sternbuch, Chanoch Ehrentreu and Yitzchok Arieli.

== Rosh yeshiva ==
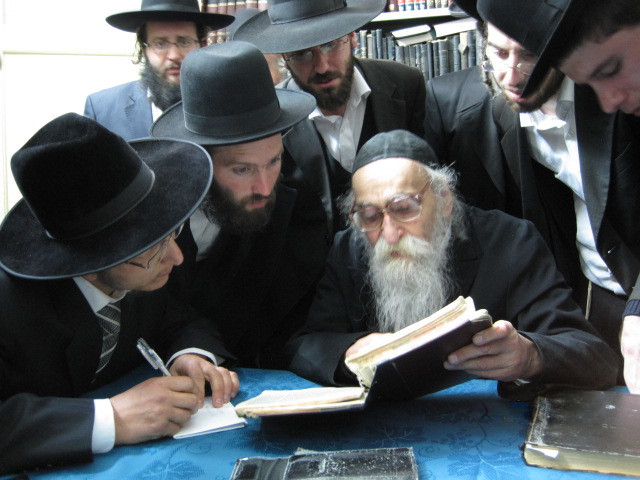
Soloveitchik with students

In 1960, Soloveitchik opened his yeshiva in the Gush Shemonim section of the Givat Moshe neighborhood of Jerusalem, and served there as rosh yeshiva (dean). Brisk yeshivas in Israel are attended by select young Talmudists, mainly from the United States.

He did not personally publish any works on the Talmud, but many of his works have been published by his students, especially in the Mishor prints of his father's works. He rarely gave approbations to new books.

Soloveitchik was considered by Briskers to be one of the last authentic remnants of a pre-World War II Jewish Lithuania, and is often quoted for his memories of his father's and grandfather's lives and teachings.

== Family tree ==
Brisker family tree

Rabbanit Esti Rosenberg, director of Migdal Oz (seminary)
Rabbi Yitzchok Lichtenstein, Co-Rosh Yeshiva of Yeshiva Torah Vodaas; Rabbi Bais Avrohom, Monsey, NY
Rabbi Yosef Dov (Reb Berel) Soloveichik | Rabbi Avrohom Yehoshua Soloveichik | Rabbi Mosheh Lichtenstein, Co-Rosh Yeshiva of Yeshivat Har Etzion
Rabbi Meshulam Dovid (Reb Dovid) Soloveichik | Rabbi Yitzchak Zev Soloveichik | Rabbi Mayer Lichtenstein, Rabbi Ohel Menachem Bet Shemesh
Rabbi Yosef Dov (HaLevi) Soloveichik author of Beis HaLevi | Rabbi Chaim Soloveichik "Reb Chaim Brisker" | Rabbi Yitzchak Zev (Reb Velvel) Soloveichik "The GRIZ"; The Brisker Rov | Lifsha Soloveitchik Feinstein | Dr. Tovah Soloveitchik Lichtenstein | Rabbi Jonathan Rosenblatt
Rabbi Refael Shapiro, Rosh Yeshiva of Volozhin yeshiva | Lifsha Shapiro | Rabbi Refoel Soloveichik | Rabbi Dr. Aharon Lichtenstein | Tzipporah Rosenblatt
Rabbi Meir Soloveichik | Dr. Atarah Soloveitchik Twersky | Rabbi Mosheh Twersky z"l, Maggid Shiur at Yeshiva Toras Moshe
Rabbi Dr. Joseph B. (Yosef Dov) Soloveitchik "The Rav" | Rabbi Dr. Isadore Twersky, Talner Rebbe of Boston | Rabbi Mayer Twersky, Rosh Yeshiva at Rabbi Isaac Elchanan Theological Seminary
Rabbi Moshe Soloveichik | Rabbi Ahron Soloveichik | Rabbi Dr. Haym Soloveitchik | Rabbi Moshe Soloveichik, Rosh Yeshivas Brisk (Chicago); Rav of Kehilas Beth Sholom Ahavas Achim
Peshka Feinstein Soloveichik | Dr. Samuel Soloveichik | Rabbi Eliyahu Soloveichik, Rosh Yeshiva at Lander College's Beis Medrash L'Talmud | Rabbi Meir Yaakov Soloveichik
Shulamit Soloveitchik Meiselman | Rabbi Moshe Meiselman, Rosh Yeshiva of Yeshiva Toras Moshe | Rabbi Yosef Soloveichik | Sarah Orenshein
Anne Soloveitchik Gerber | Rabbi Chayim Soloveichik, Maggid Shiur at Yeshivat Reishit; Morah D’Asrah of Kehillat Ohr Shalom, Ramat Beit Shemesh | Moshe Soloveichik
Rabbi Yosef Dov Soloveichik | Rabbi Shmuel Chaim Soloveichik
Rabbi Yitzchok Soloveichik | Rabbi Yisroel Soloveichik
Rabbi Yisroel Gershon Soloveichik | Rabbi Moshe Soloveichik | Rabbi Boruch Soloveichik
Rabbi Avraham Yeshaya Soloveichik
Daughter Soloveichik

Notes:
- Rabbi Chaim Halevi Soloveichik (the second)

== Children ==
Soloveitchik's eldest son, Yitzchok Zev Soloveitchik (II) (Reb Velvel), the son in-law of Berel Povarsky, was a maggid shiur (lecturer) in his father's yeshiva. When Meshulam Dovid died, Yitzchok Zev became the rosh yeshiva.

== Death ==
Soloveitchik died on 31 January 2021 at the age of 99, with ten thousand mourners at his funeral. He was buried beside his father on Har Hamenuchos.

It was announced at the funeral that according to Soloveitchik's wishes his oldest son Yitzchok Zev would succeed him as rosh yeshiva of Brisk.

== Works ==
- Chidushei Rabbeinu Meshulem Dovid Halevi (Published in part on the first anniversary of his death)
- Shiurei Rabbeinu Meshulam Dovid HaLevi (written by students):
  - Nazir
  - Arachin
  - Zevachim Part 1
  - Zevachim Part 2
  - Zevachim Part 3
- Al Hatorah (2 Vol.)
- Drashos Mussar U'Tefila
- מאמר שעת השמד [Speech Against the Impending Draft of Bnei Torah]

== Notable students ==
- Eliezer Geldzahler (1958-2004), rosh yeshiva of Yeshiva Ohr Yisroel in Brooklyn, New York.
- Yitzchok Lichtenstein, rosh yeshiva of Torah Vodaas
- Moshe Twersky (1955-2014) maggid shiur in Yeshiva Toras Moshe
- Shraga Feivel Zimmerman, av beit din of the Federation of Synagogues in London

== Brisker rabbinic dynasty ==
Brisker family tree

Rabbanit Esti Rosenberg, director of Migdal Oz (seminary)
Rabbi Yitzchok Lichtenstein, Co-Rosh Yeshiva of Yeshiva Torah Vodaas; Rabbi Bais Avrohom, Monsey, NY
Rabbi Yosef Dov (Reb Berel) Soloveichik | Rabbi Avrohom Yehoshua Soloveichik | Rabbi Mosheh Lichtenstein, Co-Rosh Yeshiva of Yeshivat Har Etzion
Rabbi Meshulam Dovid (Reb Dovid) Soloveichik | Rabbi Yitzchak Zev Soloveichik | Rabbi Mayer Lichtenstein, Rabbi Ohel Menachem Bet Shemesh
Rabbi Yosef Dov (HaLevi) Soloveichik author of Beis HaLevi | Rabbi Chaim Soloveichik "Reb Chaim Brisker" | Rabbi Yitzchak Zev (Reb Velvel) Soloveichik "The GRIZ"; The Brisker Rov | Lifsha Soloveitchik Feinstein | Dr. Tovah Soloveitchik Lichtenstein | Rabbi Jonathan Rosenblatt
Rabbi Refael Shapiro, Rosh Yeshiva of Volozhin yeshiva | Lifsha Shapiro | Rabbi Refoel Soloveichik | Rabbi Dr. Aharon Lichtenstein | Tzipporah Rosenblatt
Rabbi Meir Soloveichik | Dr. Atarah Soloveitchik Twersky | Rabbi Mosheh Twersky z"l, Maggid Shiur at Yeshiva Toras Moshe
Rabbi Dr. Joseph B. (Yosef Dov) Soloveitchik "The Rav" | Rabbi Dr. Isadore Twersky, Talner Rebbe of Boston | Rabbi Mayer Twersky, Rosh Yeshiva at Rabbi Isaac Elchanan Theological Seminary
Rabbi Moshe Soloveichik | Rabbi Ahron Soloveichik | Rabbi Dr. Haym Soloveitchik | Rabbi Moshe Soloveichik, Rosh Yeshivas Brisk (Chicago); Rav of Kehilas Beth Sholom Ahavas Achim
Peshka Feinstein Soloveichik | Dr. Samuel Soloveichik | Rabbi Eliyahu Soloveichik, Rosh Yeshiva at Lander College's Beis Medrash L'Talmud | Rabbi Meir Yaakov Soloveichik
Shulamit Soloveitchik Meiselman | Rabbi Moshe Meiselman, Rosh Yeshiva of Yeshiva Toras Moshe | Rabbi Yosef Soloveichik | Sarah Orenshein
Anne Soloveitchik Gerber | Rabbi Chayim Soloveichik, Maggid Shiur at Yeshivat Reishit; Morah D’Asrah of Kehillat Ohr Shalom, Ramat Beit Shemesh | Moshe Soloveichik
Rabbi Yosef Dov Soloveichik | Rabbi Shmuel Chaim Soloveichik
Rabbi Yitzchok Soloveichik | Rabbi Yisroel Soloveichik
Rabbi Yisroel Gershon Soloveichik | Rabbi Moshe Soloveichik | Rabbi Boruch Soloveichik
Rabbi Avraham Yeshaya Soloveichik
Daughter Soloveichik

Notes:
- Rabbi Chaim Halevi Soloveichik (the second)

== Sources ==
- rabbi Meshulam Dovid Soloveitchik Stories about his father with reb yonatan shtencel
- Meller, Rabbi Shimon Yosef (2007). The Brisker Rav: The life and times of Maran HaGaon HaRav Yitzchok Ze'ev HaLevi Soloveichik, zt"l. Feldheim Publishers. ISBN 978-1-58330-969-8.
