= Haym Soloveitchik =

American Modern Orthodox rabbi and historian

Rabbi Haym Soloveitchik
- חיים סולובייצ'יק
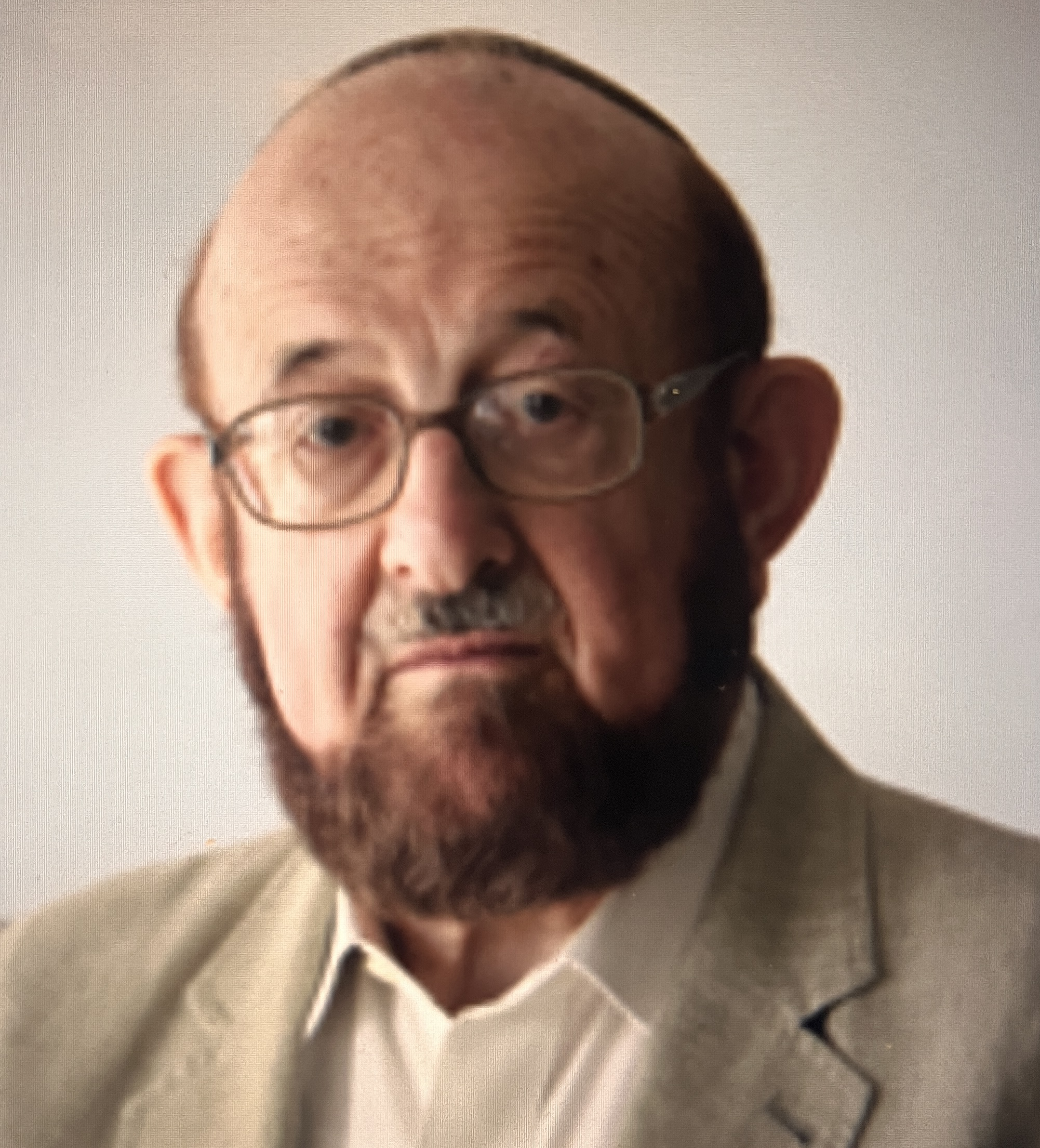
- Haym Soloveitchik

Dean of the Bernard Revel Graduate School of Yeshiva University

Personal life
- Born: September 19, 1937 (age 89)
- Parent: Joseph B. Soloveitchik (father)
- Notable work(s): Rupture and Reconstruction: The Transformation of Contemporary Orthodoxy
- Occupation: Modern Orthodox Rabbi, Historian
- Website: haymsoloveitchik.org

Religious life
- Religion: Judaism
- Denomination: Modern Orthodox

Haym Soloveitchik (Hebrew: חיים סולובייצ'יק; born September 19, 1937) is an American Modern Orthodox rabbi and historian. He is the only son of Rabbi Joseph B. Soloveitchik. He graduated from the Maimonides School which his father founded in Brookline, Massachusetts and then received his B.A. degree from Harvard College in 1958 with a major in History. After two years of post-graduate study at Harvard, he moved to Israel and began his studies toward an M.A. and PhD at the Hebrew University in Jerusalem, under the historian Professor Jacob Katz. He wrote his Master's thesis on the Halakha of gentile wine in medieval Germany. His doctorate, which he received in 1972, concentrated on laws of pawnbroking and usury. He is known to many as Dr. Gra"ch (Hebrew: ד״ר גר״ח), after his great-grandfather for whom he is named, Rabbi Chaim Soloveitchik, who was known as the Gra"ch (Hebrew: גר״ח).

== Teaching ==
Soloveitchik's four step scholarly approach to learning has influenced many of his students. The approach can be traced back to the approach of the Gaon of Vilna. The first step is concentrating on the text. This follows the Vilna Gaon's approach of carefully amending the texts of both exoteric (the Talmud) and esoteric works (for instance, the Torat Kohanim, Tosefta, Avot de-Rabbi Natan, etc.). The second step is knowing the physical reality of the objects described. Third is the conceptual analysis proffered by Rishonim. At this point he introduces an important distinction between Rishonim, which are primary sources, and must be mastered, even if one has to struggle to understand them; and Achronim, which are secondary sources, which can be exploited (if you find good material, use it, but if you don't understand it, don't spend too much time on it). The fourth and final step is sevarah, creating the intellectual framework underpinning the Torah.

Soloveitchik taught at Hebrew University until 1984, and reached the rank of full Professor. During that period, he also taught at and served as Dean of the Bernard Revel Graduate School of Yeshiva University and served as a Rosh Yeshiva at its affiliate, the Rabbi Isaac Elchanan Theological Seminary. In the early 1980s, he left Hebrew University and began teaching at Yeshiva University on a full-time basis, serving as University Professor. He taught there until 2006, when he was appointed Merkin Family Research Professor in Jewish History and Literature.

Rabbi Michael Rosensweig wrote his Ph.D. (Debt Collection in Absentia: Halakhah in a Mobile and Commercial Age) under Prof. Soloveitchik and is one of the few students mentored by him.

== Scholarship ==
Haym Soloveitchik is acknowledged as a leading contemporary historian of Jewish law. Much of his work focuses on the interaction of Halakha with changing economic realities. Specifically, he has produced major studies of usury and pawnbroking and the multiple ramifications of Jewish involvement in the manufacture and sale of wine. A major theme of his writing is the positing of an essential integrity to the Ashkenazi Jewish legal process in its interaction with contemporary challenges.

Soloveitchik's oft-cited essay Rupture and Reconstruction, where he criticizes the triumph of the elite religion of the yeshiva world over the folk religion of American Orthodoxy, is viewed as a major statement on the state of contemporary Orthodox Judaism. However, he himself denies that he conducted any such criticism.

== Family tree ==
Brisker family tree

Rabbanit Esti Rosenberg, director of Migdal Oz (seminary)
Rabbi Yitzchok Lichtenstein, Co-Rosh Yeshiva of Yeshiva Torah Vodaas; Rabbi Bais Avrohom, Monsey, NY
Rabbi Yosef Dov (Reb Berel) Soloveichik	Rabbi Avrohom Yehoshua Soloveichik	Rabbi Mosheh Lichtenstein, Co-Rosh Yeshiva of Yeshivat Har Etzion
Rabbi Meshulam Dovid (Reb Dovid) Soloveichik	Rabbi Yitzchak Zev Soloveichik	Rabbi Mayer Lichtenstein, Rabbi Ohel Menachem Bet Shemesh
Rabbi Yosef Dov (HaLevi) Soloveichik author of Beis HaLevi	Rabbi Chaim Soloveichik "Reb Chaim Brisker"	Rabbi Yitzchak Zev (Reb Velvel) Soloveichik "The GRIZ"; The Brisker Rov	Lifsha Soloveitchik Feinstein	Dr. Tovah Soloveitchik Lichtenstein	Rabbi Jonathan Rosenblatt
Rabbi Refael Shapiro, Rosh Yeshiva of Volozhin yeshiva	Lifsha Shapiro	Rabbi Refoel Soloveichik	Rabbi Dr. Aharon Lichtenstein	Tzipporah Rosenblatt
Rabbi Meir Soloveichik	Dr. Atarah Soloveitchik Twersky	Rabbi Mosheh Twersky z"l, Maggid Shiur at Yeshiva Toras Moshe
Rabbi Dr. Joseph B. (Yosef Dov) Soloveitchik "The Rav"	Rabbi Dr. Isadore Twersky, Talner Rebbe of Boston	Rabbi Mayer Twersky, Rosh Yeshiva at Rabbi Isaac Elchanan Theological Seminary
Rabbi Moshe Soloveichik	Rabbi Ahron Soloveichik	Rabbi Dr. Haym Soloveitchik	Rabbi Moshe Soloveichik, Rosh Yeshivas Brisk (Chicago); Rav of Kehilas Beth Sholom Ahavas Achim
Pesia Feinstein Soloveichik	Dr. Samuel Soloveichik	Rabbi Eliyahu Soloveichik, Rosh Yeshiva at Lander College's Beis Medrash L'Talmud	Rabbi Meir Yaakov Soloveichik
Shulamit Soloveitchik Meiselman	Rabbi Moshe Meiselman, Rosh Yeshiva of Yeshiva Toras Moshe	Rabbi Yosef Soloveichik	Sarah Orenshein
Anne Soloveitchik Gerber	Rabbi Chayim Soloveichik, Maggid Shiur at Yeshivat Reishit; Morah D’Asrah of Kehillat Ohr Shalom, Ramat Beit Shemesh	Moshe Soloveichik
Rabbi Yosef Dov Soloveichik	Rabbi Shmuel Chaim Soloveichik
Rabbi Yitzchok Soloveichik	Rabbi Yisroel Soloveichik
Rabbi Yisroel Gershon Soloveichik	Rabbi Moshe Soloveichik	Rabbi Boruch Soloveichik
Rabbi Avraham Yeshaya Soloveichik
Daughter Soloveichik

Notes:
- Rabbi Chaim Halevi Soloveichik (the second)

== Published works ==
Books

- Halakha, Economy and Self-Image, Jerusalem 1985.
- Responsa as an Historical Source, Jerusalem 1990.
- Principles and Pressures: Jewish Trade in Gentile Wine in the Middle Ages. (Tel Aviv: Am Oved, 2003).
- Wine in Ashkenaz in the Middle Ages : yeyn nesekh, a study in the history of halakhah.(Jerusalem: Zalman Shazar Center, 2008).
- Collected Essays, Volume 1 Littman Library Of Jewish Civilization 2013.
- Collected Essays, Volume 2 Littman Library Of Jewish Civilization 2014.
- "Collected Essays, Volume 3" Littman Library Of Jewish Civilization 2020
- Rupture and Reconstruction: The Transformation of Modern Orthodoxy. London; Liverpool: Littman Library of Jewish Civilization; Liverpool University Press. 2021. ISBN 978-1-906764-38-8.

Articles

- 'Pawnbroking: A Study in "Ribbit" and of the Halakah in Exile,' PAAJR 38-39(1970–1971)203-268.
- 'Three Themes in Sefer Hassidim,' AJS Review 1 (1976), 311-358
- 'Can Halakhic Texts Talk History?" AJS Review 3 (1978), pp. 153-196
- 'Maimonides’"’Iggeret Ha-Shemad" - Law and Rhetoric,' Rabbi Joseph H. Lookstein Memorial Volume, New York 1980, 281–319.
- 'Rabad of Posquières: A Programmatic Essay,' Studies in the History of Jewish Society Presented to Jacob Katz, Jerusalem 1980, vii-xl.
- 'Religious Law and Change: The Medieval Ashkenazic Example,' AJS Review 12(1987), 205–221.
- 'History of Halakhah - Methodological Issues: A Review Essay of I. Twersky's "Rabad of Posquières,"' Jewish History 5(1991), 75-124.
- 'Catastrophe and Halakhic Creativity: Ashkenaz - 1096, 1242, 1306 and 1298,' Jewish History 12(1998), 71–85.
- '[On] Yishaq (Eric) Zimmer, "Olam ke-Minhago Noheg"' AJS Review 23(1998), 223–234.
- 'Rupture and Reconstruction: The Transformation of Contemporary Orthodoxy,' Tradition, 28(1994) 64-130.
- 'Responsa: Literary History and Basic Literacy,' AJS Review, 24(1999),343-357.
- 'Piety, Pietism and German Pietism : "Sefer Hasidim I" and the influence of "Hasidei Ashkenaz," Jewish Quarterly Review 92(2002), 455–493.
- 'Halakhah, Hermeneutics, and Martyrdom in Medieval Ashkenaz,' Jewish Quarterly Review 94,1 (2004) 77-108; 2: 278–299.
- 'The Midrash, "Sefer Hasidim" and the Changing Face of God,' Creation and Re-Creation in Jewish Thought, New York 2005, 165–177.
