= Samuel Soloveichik =

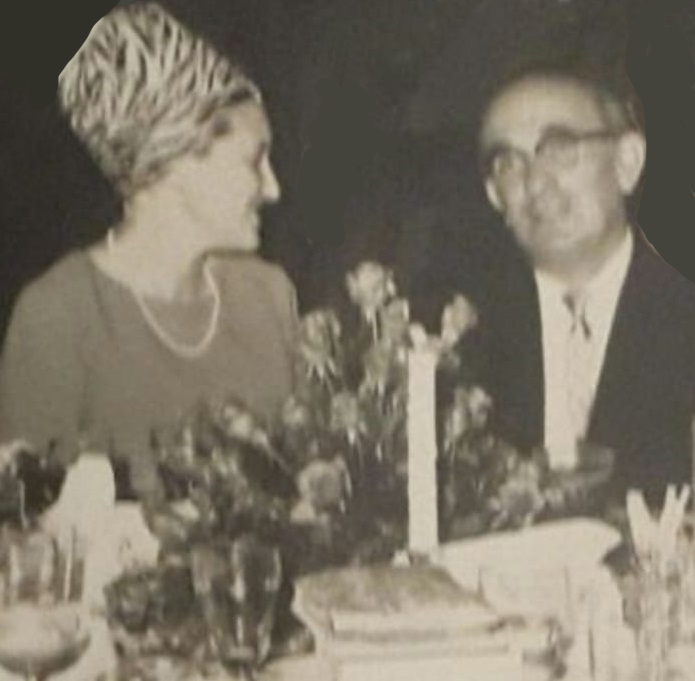
Prof. Samuel Soloveichik attending a wedding with his wife in New York City, 1963.

Dr. Samuel (Shmuel Yaakov) Soloveichik (1909 – February 25, 1967) was an Orthodox Jewish chemist and talmudist.

== Early life ==
Born in Pruzhany, Samuel Soloveichik was the second son of Rabbi Moshe Soloveichik. He was the brother of rabbis Joseph Soloveitchik (1903-1993) and Ahron Soloveichik (1917-2001). He had two sisters, Mrs. Shulamith Meiselman (1912-2009), and Mrs. Anne Gerber (1915-2011).

After engaging in talmudic studies with his father, Soloveichik studied mathematics and science. In 1934 he received a doctorate in chemistry from the University of Brussels, graduating magnum cum laude. In 1939 he emigrated to the United States. During the Second World War Soloveichik worked as a research chemist for the Board of Chemical Warfare and the Board of Economic Warfare.

== Career ==
In 1950, he received a Research Fellowship at Yeshiva University becoming Lecturer in Chemistry in the University's Chemistry Department in 1953. From 1959 until his death he was Associate Professor of Chemistry. He was also a member of the American Chemical Society and the American Association for the Advancement of Science.

In a paper published in 1966, Soloveichik proposed a means of classifying aliphatic compounds similar to the periodic table. Prior to publishing the paper he discussed its contents with the chemist Linus Pauling in August–September 1955.

Soloveichik was an expert and frequently lectured and wrote in the field of the History of Chemistry. In a series of papers he attributed the premature deaths or illnesses of the chemists Joseph Priestley, Carl Wilhelm Scheele, Humphry Davy, William Cruickshank (chemist) and James Woodhouse to chemical poisoning.

In lectures at Yeshiva University Soloveichik discussed the relationship between science and Torah with regard to issues such as the age of the earth and whether the earth orbits the sun or vice versa.

== Death ==
Soloveichik died aged 58 on February 25, 1967, at Montefiore Hospital in the Bronx, New York. He was survived by his wife Bathsheba Ziv, a teacher at the Beis Yaakov-Beis Miriam High School in the Bronx, and his four siblings. His older brother Joseph Ber delivered a brief eulogy at his funeral, as did Yeshiva University President, Dr. Samuel Belkin. The main eulogy, lasting close to two hours, was delivered by his younger brother, Ahron.

The Dr. Samuel Soloveichik Prize in Natural Science was established at Yeshiva University in his memory.

== Brisker Family Tree ==
Brisker family tree

Rabbanit Esti Rosenberg, director of Migdal Oz (seminary)
Rabbi Yitzchok Lichtenstein, Co-Rosh Yeshiva of Yeshiva Torah Vodaas; Rabbi Bais Avrohom, Monsey, NY
Rabbi Yosef Dov (Reb Berel) Soloveichik	Rabbi Avrohom Yehoshua Soloveichik	Rabbi Mosheh Lichtenstein, Co-Rosh Yeshiva of Yeshivat Har Etzion
Rabbi Meshulam Dovid (Reb Dovid) Soloveichik	Rabbi Yitzchak Zev Soloveichik	Rabbi Mayer Lichtenstein, Rabbi Ohel Menachem Bet Shemesh
Rabbi Yosef Dov (HaLevi) Soloveichik author of Beis HaLevi	Rabbi Chaim Soloveichik "Reb Chaim Brisker"	Rabbi Yitzchak Zev (Reb Velvel) Soloveichik "The GRIZ"; The Brisker Rov	Lifsha Soloveitchik Feinstein	Dr. Tovah Soloveitchik Lichtenstein	Rabbi Jonathan Rosenblatt
Rabbi Refael Shapiro, Rosh Yeshiva of Volozhin yeshiva	Lifsha Shapiro	Rabbi Refoel Soloveichik	Rabbi Dr. Aharon Lichtenstein	Tzipporah Rosenblatt
Rabbi Meir Soloveichik	Dr. Atarah Soloveitchik Twersky	Rabbi Mosheh Twersky z"l, Maggid Shiur at Yeshiva Toras Moshe
Rabbi Dr. Joseph B. (Yosef Dov) Soloveitchik "The Rav"	Rabbi Dr. Isadore Twersky, Talner Rebbe of Boston	Rabbi Mayer Twersky, Rosh Yeshiva at Rabbi Isaac Elchanan Theological Seminary
Rabbi Moshe Soloveichik	Rabbi Ahron Soloveichik	Rabbi Dr. Haym Soloveitchik	Rabbi Moshe Soloveichik, Rosh Yeshivas Brisk (Chicago); Rav of Kehilas Beth Sholom Ahavas Achim
Peshka Feinstein Soloveichik	Dr. Samuel Soloveichik	Rabbi Eliyahu Soloveichik, Rosh Yeshiva at Lander College's Beis Medrash L'Talmud	Rabbi Meir Yaakov Soloveichik
Shulamit Soloveitchik Meiselman	Rabbi Moshe Meiselman, Rosh Yeshiva of Yeshiva Toras Moshe	Rabbi Yosef Soloveichik	Sarah Orenshein
Anne Soloveitchik Gerber	Rabbi Chayim Soloveichik, Maggid Shiur at Yeshivat Reishit; Morah D’Asrah of Kehillat Ohr Shalom, Ramat Beit Shemesh	Moshe Soloveichik
Rabbi Yosef Dov Soloveichik	Rabbi Shmuel Chaim Soloveichik
Rabbi Yitzchok Soloveichik	Rabbi Yisroel Soloveichik
Rabbi Yisroel Gershon Soloveichik	Rabbi Moshe Soloveichik	Rabbi Boruch Soloveichik
Rabbi Avraham Yeshaya Soloveichik
Daughter Soloveichik

Notes:
- Rabbi Chaim Halevi Soloveichik (the second)

== Articles ==
- "The Last Fight for Phlogiston and the Death of Priestley," J. Chem. Educ. 39 (1962), pp. 644–646
- "Hidden Danger In the Lab", Chem. Eng. News, 41(37), (1963), p. 178
- "Toxicity: Killer of great chemists?," J. Chem. Educ., 41 (5),(1964), p. 282
- and Henry Krakauer "Oxidation stages of organic aliphatic compounds: A classification scheme" J. Chem. Educ. 43 (10) 1966, p. 532
- and Henry Krakauer, "Alfred Werner," in Werner Centennial: A Symposium, ed. George B. Kauffman (Washington, D.C.: American Chemical Society), pp. 3–7

== Patents ==
- 'Method for Preparing Formic Esters', (US Patent 2617821, November 11, 1952)
- 'Process for the Production of Nitrous Esters' (Serial No. 438,325, August 2, 1955)
