= Meir Soloveichik =

American Orthodox rabbi, academic, and writer (born 1977)

Rabbi Meir Yaakov Soloveichik

Rabbi of Congregation Shearith Israel

Director of the Straus Center for Torah and Western Thought at Yeshiva University

Personal details
- Born: July 29, 1977 (age 49)
- Spouse: Layaliza Soloveichik (née Klein)
- Parent: Rabbi Eliyahu Soloveichik
- Education: Yeshiva College (BA); Rabbi Isaac Elchanan Theological Seminary; Yale University; Princeton University (PhD)
- Occupation: Orthodox Rabbi, Writer

Meir Yaakov Soloveichik (born July 29, 1977) is an American Orthodox rabbi, academic, and writer. He is the son of Rabbi Eliyahu Soloveichik, grandson of Rabbi Ahron Soloveichik, and a great nephew of Rabbi Joseph B. Soloveitchik, the leader of American Jewry who identified with what became known as Modern Orthodoxy. He is the rabbi of Congregation Shearith Israel in Manhattan, New York, the oldest Jewish congregation in the United States.

Soloveichik has written books and articles on Torah, Jewish thought, Jews in America, as well as on American political history. He is the director of the Straus Center for Torah and Western Thought at Yeshiva University, where he is a professor of Judaic Studies.

Soloveichik currently serves as a member of the Religious Liberty Commission and is vice chair of the United States Commission on International Religious Freedom.

== Education ==
Soloveichik attended Cheder Lubavitch Hebrew Day School in Skokie, Illinois, for elementary school and Brisk Yeshiva high school in Chicago. He then graduated summa cum laude from Yeshiva College in New York City, where he also received rabbinic ordination (semicha) at Rabbi Isaac Elchanan Theological Seminary and studied philosophy of religion at Yale University Divinity School, although he did not receive a degree from Yale. He later received a PhD in Religion from Princeton University. He wrote his doctorate on the Modern Orthodox theologian Michael Wyschogrod.

== Career ==
A regular contributor to general interest and Jewish publications such as First Things, The Forward, Commentary Magazine, and the journal Azure, where he was Contributing Editor, he has written a number of articles concerning issues in Jewish thought and life, the relationship between Judaism and Christianity and the limits of interfaith dialogue established by Rabbi Joseph B. Soloveitchik.

He was the resident scholar of the Jewish Center in New York City, and later, Associate Rabbi at Congregation Kehilath Jeshurun, also in New York City. In May 2013, he became Rabbi of Congregation Shearith Israel in New York City, a Sephardic synagogue, and the oldest Jewish congregation in the United States.

He is the director of the Straus Center for Torah and Western Thought at Yeshiva University, where he is a professor of Judaic Studies.

It had been reported that he had been considered a candidate to replace Jonathan Sacks as the Chief Rabbi of the United Kingdom. However, the position ultimately went to Ephraim Mirvis.

In August 2012, he gave the invocation at the opening session of the 2012 Republican National Convention in Tampa, Florida.

In 2024 Soloveichik was appointed to serve on the United States Commission on International Religious Freedom by Senator Mitch McConnell. In February 2025, he was elected Vice Chair of that commission.

In May 2025, he was appointed to serve as a commissioner on the Religious Liberty Commission by President Donald Trump. He is the only non-Christian founding member of the commission.

On Sunday, May 17, he appeared as a speaker at a "We Welcome Jesus" or "Rededicate 250" prayer festival.

== Brisker rabbinic dynasty ==
Brisker family tree

Rabbanit Esti Rosenberg, director of Migdal Oz (seminary)
Rabbi Yitzchok Lichtenstein, Co-Rosh Yeshiva of Yeshiva Torah Vodaas; Rabbi Bais Avrohom, Monsey, NY
Rabbi Yosef Dov (Reb Berel) Soloveichik	Rabbi Avrohom Yehoshua Soloveichik	Rabbi Mosheh Lichtenstein, Co-Rosh Yeshiva of Yeshivat Har Etzion
Rabbi Meshulam Dovid (Reb Dovid) Soloveichik	Rabbi Yitzchak Zev Soloveichik	Rabbi Mayer Lichtenstein, Rabbi Ohel Menachem Bet Shemesh
Rabbi Yosef Dov (HaLevi) Soloveichik author of Beis HaLevi	Rabbi Chaim Soloveichik "Reb Chaim Brisker"	Rabbi Yitzchak Zev (Reb Velvel) Soloveichik "The GRIZ"; The Brisker Rov	Lifsha Soloveitchik Feinstein	Dr. Tovah Soloveitchik Lichtenstein	Rabbi Jonathan Rosenblatt
Rabbi Refael Shapiro, Rosh Yeshiva of Volozhin yeshiva	Lifsha Shapiro	Rabbi Refoel Soloveichik	Rabbi Dr. Aharon Lichtenstein	Tzipporah Rosenblatt
Rabbi Meir Soloveichik	Dr. Atarah Soloveitchik Twersky	Rabbi Mosheh Twersky z"l, Maggid Shiur at Yeshiva Toras Moshe
Rabbi Dr. Joseph B. (Yosef Dov) Soloveitchik "The Rav"	Rabbi Dr. Isadore Twersky, Talner Rebbe of Boston	Rabbi Mayer Twersky, Rosh Yeshiva at Rabbi Isaac Elchanan Theological Seminary
Rabbi Moshe Soloveichik	Rabbi Ahron Soloveichik	Rabbi Dr. Haym Soloveitchik	Rabbi Moshe Soloveichik, Rosh Yeshivas Brisk (Chicago); Rav of Kehilas Beth Sholom Ahavas Achim
Peshka Feinstein Soloveichik	Dr. Samuel Soloveichik	Rabbi Eliyahu Soloveichik, Rosh Yeshiva at Lander College's Beis Medrash L'Talmud	Rabbi Meir Yaakov Soloveichik
Shulamit Soloveitchik Meiselman	Rabbi Moshe Meiselman, Rosh Yeshiva of Yeshiva Toras Moshe	Rabbi Yosef Soloveichik	Sarah Orenshein
Anne Soloveitchik Gerber	Rabbi Chayim Soloveichik, Maggid Shiur at Yeshivat Reishit; Morah D’Asrah of Kehillat Ohr Shalom, Ramat Beit Shemesh	Moshe Soloveichik
Rabbi Yosef Dov Soloveichik	Rabbi Shmuel Chaim Soloveichik
Rabbi Yitzchok Soloveichik	Rabbi Yisroel Soloveichik
Rabbi Yisroel Gershon Soloveichik	Rabbi Moshe Soloveichik	Rabbi Boruch Soloveichik
Rabbi Avraham Yeshaya Soloveichik
Daughter Soloveichik

Notes:
- Rabbi Chaim Halevi Soloveichik (the second)

== Religious writings ==
- "The Virtue of Hate," First Things (February, 2003)
- "How Soloveitchik Saw Interreligious Dialogue," The Forward (2003)
- "Sanctity of Union: An Article of Faith," The Forward (2003)
- "Redemption and the Power of Man," Azure (2004)
- "Orthodoxy and the Public Square - Symposium," Tradition (2004)
- "The Jewish Mother: A Theology," Azure (2005)
- "God's Beloved: A Defense of Chosenness," Azure (2005)
- "How Not to Become a Jew," Commentary (2006)
- "Locusts, Giraffes, and the Meaning of Kashrut," Azure (2006)
- "Rabbi Akiva's Optimism," Azure (2007)
- "Of (Religious) Fences and Neighbors," Commentary (March, 2007)
- "A Nation Under God: Jews, Christians, and the American Public Square," (2007/8)
- "No Friend in Jesus," First Things (January, 2008)
- "Why Beards?," Commentary (February, 2008)
- "Mysteries of the Menorah," Commentary (March, 2008)
- "God's First Love: The Theology of Michael Wyschogrod," First Things (November, 2009)
- "To be German and Jewish : Hermann Cohen and Rabbi Samson Raphael Hirsch," Rav Chesed II (2009)
- "Against Cloning - Symposium," Tradition (2010)
- "Jonah and Yom Kippur," Jewish Ideas Daily (September 2010)
- "Torah and Incarnation," First Things (October, 2010)
- "God's Beloved: Election and Tradition in the Theology of Michael Wyschogrod,"" PhD. Dissertation, Princeton University, (2010)
- "The Universalism of Particularity," Hain, S and Hirt, R.S. (eds.), The Next Generation of Modern Orthodoxy (2012)
- "Blessed Unions: What the Traditional Jewish Wedding Tells Us About the American Founding," Commentary (2012)

== Political writings ==
- "Irving Kristol, Edmund Burke, and the Rabbis," Jewish Review of Books (2011)
- "Redefining Religious Activity," Jewish Ideas Daily (February 2012)
- "Morality, Not Theology: The Importance of Romney's Liberty University Speech," The Weekly Standard (May 2012)
- "A Weakness for Royalty: The Vindication of John Adams,"The Weekly Standard (June 2012)
- "Bibi - Son of Benzion: The Netanyahu Legacy,"" The Weekly Standard (August 2012)
- "The Real Israel Lobby: It's the American people," The Weekly Standard (February 2013)
- "King David," First Things (January 2017)

== Lectures and sermons ==
- 'Can All Religions Be True?' (2005)
- 'The Yibbum of Henry VIII' (2009)
- 'Torah Giants Confront Modernity: A Study of Rabbanim in the Age of Enlightenment' (2010)
- 'Lincoln’s Almost Chosen People' (2020)

Judaism and the Origins of America

- 'The Founding Father at the Huppah: A Reflection on America's Beginnings'
- 'Lincoln's Yahrzeit: Pesah and the Death of an American President'
- 'Mordecai Manuel Noah: The First Truly American Jew'
- 'Light and Truth: Hebrew in Early America'

== Personal ==
He is married to Layaliza Soloveichik (née Klein), a 1997 graduate of Yale University Law School.
