= Esti Rosenberg =

American-Israeli educator (born 1965)

Rabbanit Esti Rosenberg אסתי רוזנברג
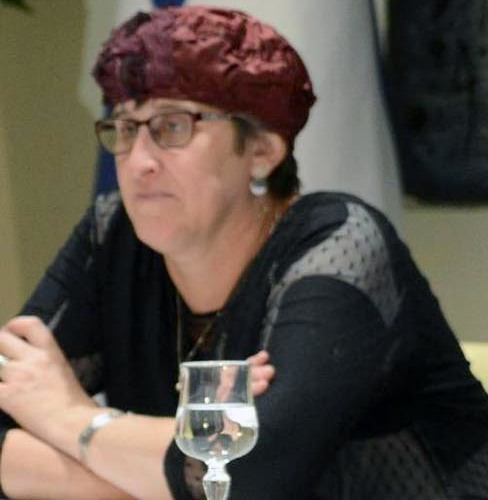

Personal life
- Born: July 24, 1965 (age 61)
- Spouse: Herzl Rosenberg
- Children: 7
- Parent(s): Aharon Lichtenstein, Tovah Lichtenstein
- Dynasty: Soloveitchik dynasty

Religious life
- Religion: Judaism
- Denomination: Orthodox Judaism

Jewish leader
- Position: Founder, Rosh Beit Midrash
- Organisation: Migdal Oz
- Residence: Alon Shevut
- Dynasty: Soloveitchik dynasty

Esti Rosenberg (Hebrew: אסתי רוזנברג; born July 24, 1965) is an American-Israeli Orthodox Rabbanit who is the founder and head of the Migdal Oz seminary. She is the daughter of Rabbi Aharon Lichtenstein and Dr. Tovah Soloveitchik and the granddaughter of Joseph B. Soloveitchik.

== Biography ==
Esti Rosenberg was born in 1965 in the United States, the fourth child of her parents, Aharon Lichtenstein and Tova Lichtenstein, and immigrated to Israel with her parents on Aliyah in 1971 at the age of six, when her father was offered the position of Rosh Yeshiva at Yeshivat Har Etzion. She studied at the Chorev Ulpana in Jerusalem and was a member of the Ezra youth movement. Rosenberg graduated with a bachelor's degree in Hebrew Literature and History from Hebrew University. She studied Tanach studies at the Michlalah-Jerusalem College and learned in one of the first graduating classes of Matan Jerusalem.

Rosenberg was Rosh Beit Midrash at Michlellet Bruriah, now known as Midreshet Lindenbaum, and served as Training Coordinator of Bnei Akiva's Jerusalem region. In 1997 she founded Migdal Oz, the sister school of Yeshivat Har Etzion, under the guidance of Aharon Lichtenstein and Yehuda Amital. Rosenberg gives many Shiurim throughout Israel, is a member of Bnei Akiva's national administration and participates in peace dialogue groups between the religious and secular and between the right-wing and left-wing groups in Israel.

== Worldview ==
Regarding the establishment of a Beit Midrash/seminary for women, Rosenberg said, "Placing Torah learning at the center of the beit midrash challenged the community of learners to delve into the experience of Abaye and Rava and into the halachic sugyot alongside serious critical thinking and learning. It is in part a building of their religious personalities and in part a meaningful breakthrough for the integration of women into the world of Torah and placing them as exemplary role models for the girls who they will teach."

Rosenberg believes, in line with the views of her grandfather Joseph B. Soloveitchik, that Torah study is a fundamental and significant component of Avodat Hashem for the Jewish woman. This includes all fields of Torah, including Talmud, Tanach, Jewish philosophy and hasidic philosophy. All these subjects are taught in depth at Migdal Oz with an emphasis on independent learning of students with each other which Rosenberg believes is crucial in cultivating Torah learning as a substantive component in the life of the student. Rosenberg has stated that learning in the beit midrash is a merit that becomes an obligation towards the Jewish People. Therefore, she calls upon her students to influence all areas of life in Israeli society, especially in the professions of teaching and education.

== Personal ==
Rosenberg is married to Herzl Rosenberg. They have seven children and live in Alon Shevut.

== Family tree ==
Brisker family tree

Rabbanit Esti Rosenberg, director of Migdal Oz (seminary)
Rabbi Yitzchok Lichtenstein, Co-Rosh Yeshiva of Yeshiva Torah Vodaas; Rabbi Bais Avrohom, Monsey, NY
Rabbi Yosef Dov (Reb Berel) Soloveichik	Rabbi Avrohom Yehoshua Soloveichik	Rabbi Mosheh Lichtenstein, Co-Rosh Yeshiva of Yeshivat Har Etzion
Rabbi Meshulam Dovid (Reb Dovid) Soloveichik	Rabbi Yitzchak Zev Soloveichik	Rabbi Mayer Lichtenstein, Rabbi Ohel Menachem Bet Shemesh
Rabbi Yosef Dov (HaLevi) Soloveichik author of Beis HaLevi	Rabbi Chaim Soloveichik "Reb Chaim Brisker"	Rabbi Yitzchak Zev (Reb Velvel) Soloveichik "The GRIZ"; The Brisker Rov	Lifsha Soloveitchik Feinstein	Dr. Tovah Soloveitchik Lichtenstein	Rabbi Jonathan Rosenblatt
Rabbi Refael Shapiro, Rosh Yeshiva of Volozhin yeshiva	Lifsha Shapiro	Rabbi Refoel Soloveichik	Rabbi Dr. Aharon Lichtenstein	Tzipporah Rosenblatt
Rabbi Meir Soloveichik	Dr. Atarah Soloveitchik Twersky	Rabbi Mosheh Twersky z"l, Maggid Shiur at Yeshiva Toras Moshe
Rabbi Dr. Joseph B. (Yosef Dov) Soloveitchik "The Rav"	Rabbi Dr. Isadore Twersky, Talner Rebbe of Boston	Rabbi Mayer Twersky, Rosh Yeshiva at Rabbi Isaac Elchanan Theological Seminary
Rabbi Moshe Soloveichik	Rabbi Ahron Soloveichik	Rabbi Dr. Haym Soloveitchik	Rabbi Moshe Soloveichik, Rosh Yeshivas Brisk (Chicago); Rav of Kehilas Beth Sholom Ahavas Achim
Peshka Feinstein Soloveichik	Dr. Samuel Soloveichik	Rabbi Eliyahu Soloveichik, Rosh Yeshiva at Lander College's Beis Medrash L'Talmud	Rabbi Meir Yaakov Soloveichik
Shulamit Soloveitchik Meiselman	Rabbi Moshe Meiselman, Rosh Yeshiva of Yeshiva Toras Moshe	Rabbi Yosef Soloveichik	Sarah Orenshein
Anne Soloveitchik Gerber	Rabbi Chayim Soloveichik, Maggid Shiur at Yeshivat Reishit; Morah D’Asrah of Kehillat Ohr Shalom, Ramat Beit Shemesh	Moshe Soloveichik
Rabbi Yosef Dov Soloveichik	Rabbi Shmuel Chaim Soloveichik
Rabbi Yitzchok Soloveichik	Rabbi Yisroel Soloveichik
Rabbi Yisroel Gershon Soloveichik	Rabbi Moshe Soloveichik	Rabbi Boruch Soloveichik
Rabbi Avraham Yeshaya Soloveichik
Daughter Soloveichik

Notes:
- Rabbi Chaim Halevi Soloveichik (the second)
