= Beis Yisrael =

Beis Yisrael (Hebrew: בית ישראל), also spelled Beis Yisroel, Bais Yisroel, or Beit Yisrael, may refer to:

- Beit Yisrael, a neighborhood in Jerusalem, Israel
- Yisrael Alter, the fourth Gerrer Rebbe, known as the Beis Yisrael
- Yeshivas Bais Yisroel, a post-high-school yeshiva in Neve Yaakov, Jerusalem
