= Moshe Soloveichik =

Belarusian-Lithuanian Orthodox rabbi

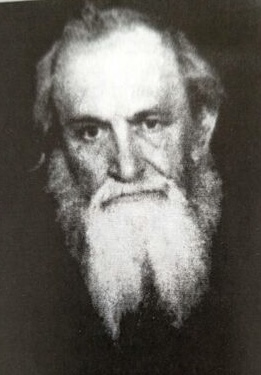
- Rabbi Moshe Soloveichik

Personal life
- Born: 1879
- Died: January 21, 1941 (aged 62)
- Spouse: Pesia Feinstein
- Children: 5, including Joseph

Religious life
- Religion: Judaism
- Denomination: Orthodox Judaism

Jewish leader
- Position: Rosh Yeshiva
- Yeshiva: Rabbi Isaac Elchanan Theological Seminary

Moshe Soloveichik (1879 – January 31, 1941) was an Orthodox rabbi. He was Rosh Yeshiva at the Rabbi Isaac Elchanan Theological Seminary of Yeshiva University.

== Biography ==
He was born in Valozhyn, the middle son of Chaim Soloveitchik and grandson of the Beis HaLevi. He married Pesia Feinstein, daughter of the Rabbi of Pruzany, Eliyahu Feinstein, and first cousin with Rabbi Moshe Feinstein.

At the age of 31, he was appointed rabbi of the town of Raseiniai, a position he held for three years. He also was the dean of a yeshiva in the town that Rabbi Nosson Tzvi Finkel of Slabodka was instrumental in founding. In 1913, he took the position of rabbi of Khislavichi.

After World War I, he went to Poland in 1920, and served as the director of Talmud studies at Tachkemoni Rabbinical Seminary in Warsaw.

From there he immigrated to New York in 1929, joining the faculty as a Rosh Yeshiva at the Rabbi Isaac Elchanan Theological Seminary of Yeshiva University.

While Soloveichik was in New York City, his eldest son, Joseph B. Soloveitchik (known as Yosef Dov) was working on his PhD in philosophy at the University of Berlin, which he completed in 1931. The following year, Yosef Dov moved to Boston and became head of the Orthodox Jewish community there. When Soloveichik died in 1941 at the age of 62, Yosef Dov was asked to fill his father's place.

His funeral at RIETS was attended by more than 4,000 mourners and he was eulogized by Rabbi Moshe Rosen on behalf of the Union of Orthodox Rabbis as well as his wife's cousin Moshe Feinstein and other rabbinic leaders.

Soloveichik's two younger sons were Ahron Soloveichik (1917–2001), who also taught at RIETS, and Samuel Soloveichik (1909–1967) who taught chemistry at Yeshiva College. He also had two daughters: Shulamit Soloveitchik Meiselman (1912–2009), and Anne Soloveitchik Gerber (1913-2011).

In 1938, Rabbi Moshe Besdin founded Yeshiva Rabbi Moses Soloveitchik, located in Beth Hamedrash Hagodol Synagogue in Manhattan. In 1941, Besdin chaired the memorial service for Rabbi Soloveichik at Yeshiva University.

== Notable students ==
=== In Europe ===
- Dovid Leibowitz

=== In America ===
- Jacob B. Agus
- Abraham Avrutick
- Mordechai Gifter
- Bernard Lander
- Moses Mescheloff
- Avigdor Miller
- Emanuel Rackman
- Chaim Pinchas Scheinberg
- Melech Schachter
- Nosson Meir Wachtfogel
- Louis (Eliezer) Werfel
- Chaim Zimmerman

== Brisk family tree ==
Brisker family tree

Rabbanit Esti Rosenberg, director of Migdal Oz (seminary)
Rabbi Yitzchok Lichtenstein, Co-Rosh Yeshiva of Yeshiva Torah Vodaas; Rabbi Bais Avrohom, Monsey, NY
Rabbi Yosef Dov (Reb Berel) Soloveichik | Rabbi Avrohom Yehoshua Soloveichik | Rabbi Mosheh Lichtenstein, Co-Rosh Yeshiva of Yeshivat Har Etzion
Rabbi Meshulam Dovid (Reb Dovid) Soloveichik | Rabbi Yitzchak Zev Soloveichik | Rabbi Mayer Lichtenstein, Rabbi Ohel Menachem Bet Shemesh
Rabbi Yosef Dov (HaLevi) Soloveichik author of Beis HaLevi | Rabbi Chaim Soloveichik "Reb Chaim Brisker" | Rabbi Yitzchak Zev (Reb Velvel) Soloveichik "The GRIZ"; The Brisker Rov | Lifsha Soloveitchik Feinstein | Dr. Tovah Soloveitchik Lichtenstein | Rabbi Jonathan Rosenblatt
Rabbi Refael Shapiro, Rosh Yeshiva of Volozhin yeshiva | Lifsha Shapiro | Rabbi Refoel Soloveichik | Rabbi Dr. Aharon Lichtenstein | Tzipporah Rosenblatt
Rabbi Meir Soloveichik | Dr. Atarah Soloveitchik Twersky | Rabbi Mosheh Twersky z"l, Maggid Shiur at Yeshiva Toras Moshe
Rabbi Dr. Joseph B. (Yosef Dov) Soloveitchik "The Rav" | Rabbi Dr. Isadore Twersky, Talner Rebbe of Boston | Rabbi Mayer Twersky, Rosh Yeshiva at Rabbi Isaac Elchanan Theological Seminary
Rabbi Moshe Soloveichik | Rabbi Ahron Soloveichik | Rabbi Dr. Haym Soloveitchik | Rabbi Moshe Soloveichik, Rosh Yeshivas Brisk (Chicago); Rav of Kehilas Beth Sholom Ahavas Achim
Pesia Feinstein Soloveichik | Dr. Samuel Soloveichik | Rabbi Eliyahu Soloveichik, Rosh Yeshiva at Lander College's Beis Medrash L'Talmud | Rabbi Meir Yaakov Soloveichik
Shulamit Soloveitchik Meiselman | Rabbi Moshe Meiselman, Rosh Yeshiva of Yeshiva Toras Moshe | Rabbi Yosef Soloveichik | Sarah Orenshein
Anne Soloveitchik Gerber | Rabbi Chayim Soloveichik, Maggid Shiur at Yeshivat Reishit; Morah D’Asrah of Kehillat Ohr Shalom, Ramat Beit Shemesh | Moshe Soloveichik
Rabbi Yosef Dov Soloveichik | Rabbi Shmuel Chaim Soloveichik
Rabbi Yitzchok Soloveichik | Rabbi Yisroel Soloveichik
Rabbi Yisroel Gershon Soloveichik | Rabbi Moshe Soloveichik | Rabbi Boruch Soloveichik
Rabbi Avraham Yeshaya Soloveichik
Daughter Soloveichik

Notes:
- Rabbi Chaim Halevi Soloveichik (the second)

== Publications ==
- HaPardes, No. 14 Vol. 2 1940 May: לכבוד חג הסמיכה (Address To Rabbinic Graduates)
- HaNe'eman, Vol. 28 No. 53 Elul 5739 (1939): בדין רודף והבא במחתרת

== See also ==
- Brisk yeshivas and methods
