= Yeshivas Bais Yisroel =

Coordinates: 31.840376°N 35.247719°E

- ישיבת בית ישראל

Location
- 3 Zevin St. Neve Yaakov; Jerusalem

Information
- Established: 1986; 40 years ago
- Rosh Yeshiva: Rabbi Doniel Lehrfield (ZT"l 20 Elul 5785); Rabbi Moshe Lehrfield
- Affiliation: Orthodox
- Bochrim: 130
- Website: yeshivasbaisyisroel.org

Yeshivas Bais Yisroel (Hebrew: ישיבת בית ישראל), colloquially known as "Bais", is an English, Litvish Orthodox yeshiva for post-high-school boys located in the Neve Yaakov neighborhood of Jerusalem. Founded in 1985 by Rabbi Doniel Lehrfield, the yeshiva's student body currently numbers over 100 students mainly from the United States, England, Canada, South Africa, Mexico, Chile and Australia. The yeshiva also operates a kollel for 40 married men, many of whom attended the yeshiva before marriage.

== Background ==
Bais Yisroel is part of the widespread trend, over the past three decades, of yeshiva learning programs in Israel for post-high-school boys from the United States and other English-speaking countries. Thirty years ago, there were only a handful of such programs for overseas students at the Mir, Brisk yeshiva, and Ponovezh. Today, there are dozens of such yeshivas.

Bais Yisroel was founded in 1985 in the Jerusalem neighborhood of Bayit Vegan as an offshoot of Yeshiva Toras Moshe. In 1994 the yeshiva moved from that location to its current location in the northern Jerusalem neighborhood of Neve Yaakov. The students sleep in dormitories which consist of converted apartments located near the yeshiva. The yeshiva owns and rents more than 10 such apartments yearly.

== Curriculum ==
The yeshiva runs a four-year program studying sections of the Talmud. It follows the learning cycles of Nashim and Nezikin, with a focus on finishing a tractate of the Talmud each semester.

College credits are offered through Touro College.

== Alumni ==
Bais Yisroel encourages its alumni to stay in touch with the rabbinic staff and participate in the continuing funding of the yeshiva through its alumni association. An online website fields questions sent by alumni to rabbis and also publishes an alumni newsletter. The Bais website is run by one of the prized shoel umeishev's, Rabbi Hilton.

Students who have gone on to receive rabbinic ordination and take positions in the Torah world include: Rabbi Aharon Ciment, Rav of Congregation Arzei Darom, Teaneck, New Jersey; Rabbi Daniel Steinherz, rosh mesivta, Yeshivat Sha'arei Mevaseret Zion, Mevaseret Zion, Israel; Rabbi Mordechai Frankel, Assistant Rabbi, Agudath Israel of Baltimore, and Rabbi Yosef Chaim Topek, Director/Mashgiach, Yeshivas Gevuros Yitzchak, Kesher Jerusalem, Israel.

Mordechai Shapiro, an American singer and entertainer, attended the yeshiva.

== Post-Yeshiva ==
Many students in Yeshivas Bais Yisroel who wish to continue their learning do so at various institutions including The Mir Yeshiva, Rabbi Tzvi Kaplan's Yeshiva, Ponovezh Yeshiva, Yeshiva Ner Israel Baltimore, Brisk Yeshiva, Bais Medrash Govoha in Lakewood, New Jersey, Borehamwood Kollel as well as smaller Yeshivas across Israel and the United States.
