= Soloveitchik rabbinic dynasty =

School of Jewish thought and tradition

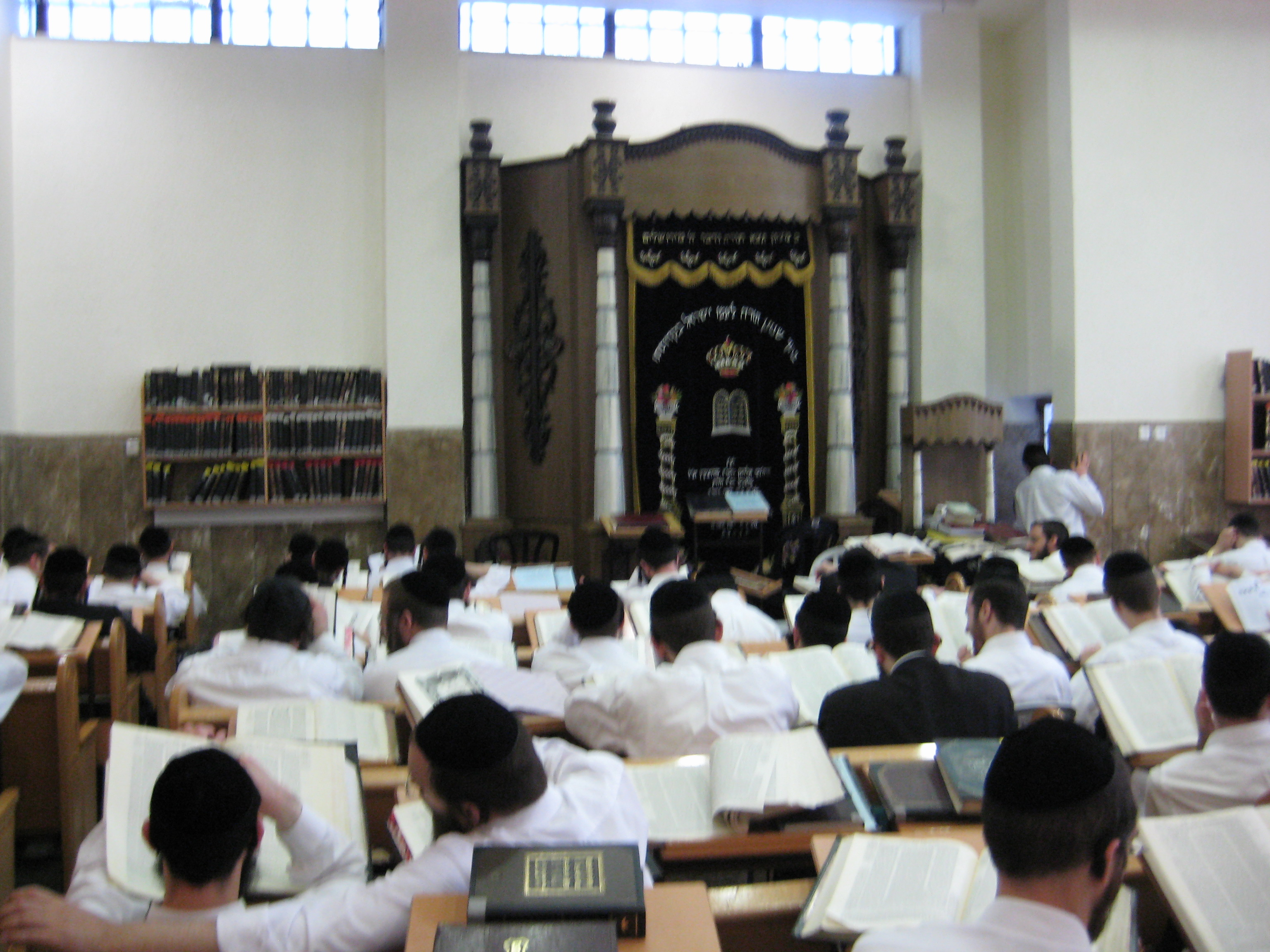
Men learning in the Brisk Yeshiva in Jerusalem of Rabbi Avrohom Yehoshua Soloveitchik.

The Soloveitchik dynasty of rabbinic scholars and their students originated the Brisker method of Talmudic study, which is embraced by their followers in the Brisk yeshivas. It is so called because of the Soloveitchiks' origin in the town of Brisk, or Brest-Litovsk, located in what is now Belarus. Many of the first Soloveitchik rabbis were the official rabbis of Brisk, and each in turn was known as "the Brisker Rov". Today, Brisk refers to several yeshivas in Israel and the United States founded by members of the Soloveitchik family, including the yeshivas of Avraham Yehoshua Soloveitchik and Dovid Soloveitchik. Brisk has been described as the "'Harvard' of the Haredim."

== The Soloveitchik dynasty ==
=== The Beis HaLevi ===
The Soloveitchik dynasty began with Rabbi Yosef Dov Soloveitchik, known as the Beis HaLevi (1820–1892), who served as rabbi of Brisk for much of his life and pioneered aspects of what would become known as the Brisker method of Talmud study. His works on the Mishneh Torah and first five books of the Torah which he authored were titled Beis HaLevi (Hebrew for "House of the Levites"). Many people therefore refer to him simply as the Beis HaLevi, which also avoids the confusion with two of his prominent great-grandsons who shared the same full name: (1) Rabbi Moshe Soloveichik's son, Rabbi Joseph Soloveitchik (1903–1993) who moved to the United States; and (2) Rabbi Yitzchak Zev Soloveitchik's son, Rabbi Berel Soloveitchik, who lived in Israel.

Soloveitchik succeeded Rabbi Yehoshua Leib Diskin as rabbi of Brisk when the latter moved to Jerusalem in 1876. He had previously served as the rabbi of Slutzk, and before that, on the faculty of the Volozhin yeshiva.

=== Rabbi Chaim Soloveitchik ===
The Beis HaLevi was succeeded as rabbi of Brisk by his son, Rabbi Chaim Soloveitchik (1853–1918), most commonly known as "Reb Chaim Brisker" (Rabbi Chaim from Brisk). He is credited as the founder of the Brisker method of Talmudic study, an analytic method focusing on precise definitions and categorizations of Jewish law. His primary work was Chidushei Rav Chaim HaLevi, a volume of insights on the Mishneh Torah which often would suggest novel understandings of the Talmud as well. His wife, the granddaughter of Rabbi Naftali Tzvi Yehuda Berlin, served as his entree to teaching at the Volozhin yeshiva. He had three sons, Yitzchak Zev, Moshe and his eldest, Yisroel Gershon.

=== Rabbi Yitzchok Zev Soloveitchik ===
Rabbi Yitzchok Zev Soloveitchik (1886–1959) became known as The Brisker Rov when he succeeded his father as rabbi of Brisk. He was often known by the name Velvel, a Yiddish nickname for "little wolf". (Zev is Hebrew for "wolf".) He is also commonly known as the "GRYZ" or "HaGRYZ," an acronym for (Ha)Gaon Rabbi Yitzchak Zev ("[the] genius Rabbi Isaac Wolf"). He became famous enough that many people, however, refer to him simply as der Brisker Rov ("the rabbi of Brisk"). In fact, many in the Brisker yeshiva world in Israel refer to him simply as "The Rov". (In the Modern Orthodox community, his nephew, Rabbi Joseph B. Soloveitchik, is referred to as "the Rav".)

Like his father, Rabbi Yitzchok Zev Soloveitchik published works based on the Mishneh Torah, often suggesting novel insights on the Talmud in the process. He fled the Holocaust and moved to the British Mandate of Palestine. His children and grandchildren live in Israel today, and have founded several yeshivas there, all known as "Brisk", based in Jerusalem.

=== Rabbi Meshulam Dovid Soloveitchik ===
Rabbi Meshulam Dovid Soloveitchik (known as Reb Dovid) was the son of Rabbi Yitzchak Zev Soloveitchik He was rosh yeshiva of Yeshivas Brisk in the Gush Shemonim section of Jerusalem. Following his death in 2021, his son Rabbi Yitzchok Zev (Velvel) Soloveitchik II succeeded him as rosh yeshiva. Like his father and grandfather he published works based on Mishnah Torah, and many of his lectures have been published by his students. He was considered by Briskers to be one of the last authentic remnants of a pre-World War II Jewish Lithuania. His students include Moshe Twersky, Rebbi in Yeshivas Toras Moshe and Rabbi Yitzchok Lichtenstein Rosh Yeshiva of Yeshiva Torah Vodaas, both grandsons of his cousin Rabbi Joseph B. Soloveitchik. He died on January 31, 2021, in Jerusalem, Israel.

=== Rabbi Berel Soloveitchik ===
Rabbi Berel Soloveitchik, commonly known simply as "Reb Berel," was one of the leading Brisker Rosh Yeshivas in Jerusalem, Israel. He was the son of Rabbi Yitzchak Zev, the Brisker Rav, and the cousin of Rabbi Joseph Ber Soloveitchik. His son, Rav Avrohom Yehoshua, succeeds him as Rosh Yeshiva of Brisk in Jerusalem.

=== Rabbi Meir Soloveitchik ===
Rabbi Meir Soloveitchik was the son of Rabbi Yitzchak Zev Soloveitchik and headed one of the Brisker Yeshivas in Jerusalem, which was attended by many Torah scholars, including the current Radziner Rebbe, Grand Rabbi Moshe Leiner. He should not be confused with Rabbi Meir Soloveichik, the son of Rabbi Ahron Soloveichik's son Rabbi Eliyahu Soloveichik. He died at the age of 87 on April 2, 2016. His yeshiva is now headed by his son Rabbi Yechiel Soloveitchik together with his brother Rabbi Avrohom Soloveichick and another yeshiva by his son Reb Velvel and his brother.

=== Rabbi Velvel Soloveitchik II ===
Rabbi Yitzchok Zev Soloveitchik, commonly known as Reb Velvel, is the eldest son of Rabbi Meshulam Dovid Soloveitchik. Following his father's death in 2021, he succeeded him as rosh yeshiva of Yeshivas Brisk in Jerusalem. He was named after his grandfather, Rabbi Yitzchok Zev Soloveitchik, the Brisker Rov.

=== Rabbi Moshe Soloveichik ===
Rabbi Chaim Soloveitchik's other famous son was Rabbi Moshe Soloveichik (1879–1941). His works on the Rambam are known as the Chiddushei HaGram haLevi and "Chiddushei haGram ve'haGrid." He served as the Rabbi of Rasseyn and then of Chaslavich. He then moved to Warsaw where he served as rosh yeshiva of Tachkemoni Rabbinical Seminary. He moved to America in 1929 and was appointed as a rosh yeshiva at Rabbi Isaac Elchanan Theological Seminary (RIETS). (While RIETS has at no point ever called itself a "Brisk yeshiva" per se, it was home for many decades to Rabbi Moshe Soloveichik and later his sons.) His sons were the famous Rabbi Joseph Soloveitchik, who lived in Boston and commuted to teach Talmud at Yeshiva University in Manhattan; Dr. Samuel Soloveichik, a chemist as well as a Talmudic scholar; and Rabbi Ahron Soloveichik, who taught at Mesivta Rabbi Chaim Berlin and then at Yeshiva University. Rav Ahron founded and was the rosh yeshiva of Yeshivas Brisk in Chicago, Illinois.

=== Rabbi Joseph B. Soloveitchik ===
Rabbi Joseph B. Soloveitchik (1903–1993) was a son of Moshe Soloveichik. In 1941, he succeeded his father as the senior Rosh Yeshiva of RIETS in New York. As he rose to become an important leader of Modern Orthodox Jewry, he ordained more than 2,000 rabbis over the course of almost half a century thereby strengthening his status as "The Rav"—as he was 'the rabbis's rabbi'.

He established Maimonides School as one of the first Jewish day schools outside the New York area in 1937 after arriving in Boston with Tanya Levitt Soloveitchik in 1935 to be the mara d'atra of the greater Boston Jewish community. Maimonides maintains many of the Rav's radical educational posits including co-education and female Talmud study. He is often credited with being a primary founder of Modern Orthodoxy, a movement of Judaism which maintains that Jews must both practice a Halakhic life without shunning the outside world. He also gave much needed validity to the Zionist effort in his famous work Kol Dodi Dofek. Although he was primarily known as a Talmudist, his best-known works of Lonely Man of Faith, Catharsis, Halachic Man, and Uvikkashtem Misham are largely philosophical.

=== Rabbi Ahron Soloveichik ===
Rabbi Ahron Soloveichik (1918–2001) was a son of Rabbi Moshe Soloveitchik. He taught at Mesivta Rabbi Chaim Berlin and then at Yeshiva University. He eventually moved to Chicago and became rosh yeshiva at the Hebrew Theological College and in 1974 founded his own yeshiva Yeshivas Brisk of Chicago. After his brother Joseph became ill, beginning in 1986 he began to commute to New York City to lecture at RIETS as well. Rabbi Ahron Soloveichik died in 2001, and Yeshivas Brisk of Chicago became defunct a few years later as a Mesivta but remains active today as a Beth Medrash under Rabbi Ahron's eldest son, Rabbi Moshe Soloveichik. His grandchildren include Rabbi Shmuel Marcus, philosopher Rabbi Dr. Meir Soloveichik, and political analyst Nechama Soloveichik. Rabbi Dr. David Applebaum was considered one of his most outstanding and devoted disciples.

Brisker family tree

Rabbanit Esti Rosenberg, director of Migdal Oz (seminary)
Rabbi Yitzchok Lichtenstein, Co-Rosh Yeshiva of Yeshiva Torah Vodaas; Rabbi Bais Avrohom, Monsey, NY
Rabbi Yosef Dov (Reb Berel) Soloveichik	Rabbi Avrohom Yehoshua Soloveichik	Rabbi Mosheh Lichtenstein, Co-Rosh Yeshiva of Yeshivat Har Etzion
Rabbi Meshulam Dovid (Reb Dovid) Soloveichik	Rabbi Yitzchak Zev Soloveichik	Rabbi Mayer Lichtenstein, Rabbi Ohel Menachem Bet Shemesh
Rabbi Yosef Dov (HaLevi) Soloveichik author of Beis HaLevi	Rabbi Chaim Soloveichik "Reb Chaim Brisker"	Rabbi Yitzchak Zev (Reb Velvel) Soloveichik "The GRIZ"; The Brisker Rov	Lifsha Soloveitchik Feinstein	Dr. Tovah Soloveitchik Lichtenstein	Rabbi Jonathan Rosenblatt
Rabbi Refael Shapiro, Rosh Yeshiva of Volozhin yeshiva	Lifsha Shapiro	Rabbi Refoel Soloveichik	Rabbi Dr. Aharon Lichtenstein	Tzipporah Rosenblatt
Rabbi Meir Soloveichik	Dr. Atarah Soloveitchik Twersky	Rabbi Mosheh Twersky z"l, Maggid Shiur at Yeshiva Toras Moshe
Rabbi Dr. Joseph B. (Yosef Dov) Soloveitchik "The Rav"	Rabbi Dr. Isadore Twersky, Talner Rebbe of Boston	Rabbi Mayer Twersky, Rosh Yeshiva at Rabbi Isaac Elchanan Theological Seminary
Rabbi Moshe Soloveichik	Rabbi Ahron Soloveichik	Rabbi Dr. Haym Soloveitchik	Rabbi Moshe Soloveichik, Rosh Yeshivas Brisk (Chicago); Rav of Kehilas Beth Sholom Ahavas Achim
Peshka Feinstein Soloveichik	Dr. Samuel Soloveichik	Rabbi Eliyahu Soloveichik, Rosh Yeshiva at Lander College's Beis Medrash L'Talmud	Rabbi Meir Yaakov Soloveichik
Shulamit Soloveitchik Meiselman	Rabbi Moshe Meiselman, Rosh Yeshiva of Yeshiva Toras Moshe	Rabbi Yosef Soloveichik	Sarah Orenshein
Anne Soloveitchik Gerber	Rabbi Chayim Soloveichik, Maggid Shiur at Yeshivat Reishit; Morah D’Asrah of Kehillat Ohr Shalom, Ramat Beit Shemesh	Moshe Soloveichik
Rabbi Yosef Dov Soloveichik	Rabbi Shmuel Chaim Soloveichik
Rabbi Yitzchok Soloveichik	Rabbi Yisroel Soloveichik
Rabbi Yisroel Gershon Soloveichik	Rabbi Moshe Soloveichik	Rabbi Boruch Soloveichik
Rabbi Avraham Yeshaya Soloveichik
Daughter Soloveichik

Notes:
- Rabbi Chaim Halevi Soloveichik (the second)
