= Starobin =

Starobin is a surname. Notable people with the surname include:

- David Starobin (born 1951), American classical guitarist, record producer and film director
- Michael Starobin (born 1956), American orchestrator and music arranger
- Joseph Starobin (1913–1976), American journalist and Communist Party member.

== See also ==
- Starobin, Belarus, a municipality in Salihorsk District, Minsk Region, Belarus
