= Ahron Soloveichik =

American rabbi (1917–2001)

Rabbi Dr. Ahron Soloveichik
- אהרן סולובייצ'יק

Rosh Yeshiva of Yeshivas Brisk
- In office 1974–2001

Personal life
- Born: May 1, 1917 Khislavichi, Russia
- Died: October 4, 2001 (aged 84)
- Notable work(s): The Warmth and the Light
- Occupation: Rabbi, Rosh Yeshiva

Religious life
- Religion: Judaism
- Denomination: Orthodox

Ahron (Aaron) Soloveichik (Hebrew: אהרן סולובייצ'יק; May 1, 1917 – October 4, 2001) was an Orthodox Jewish rosh yeshiva (seminary dean) and scholar of Talmud and halakha.

== Biography ==
The youngest of five children, Ahron Soloveichik was born to Moshe Soloveichik in Khislavichi, Russia, at which time his father was the rabbi of that town. Joseph Soloveitchik and Samuel Soloveichik were his older brothers.

His family first moved to Poland in 1920. Before his father moved to New York in 1929, Moshe engaged his student Yitzchak Hutner to become Soloveichik's rebbe. Soloveichik was Hutner's first student. Soloveichik celebrated his bar mitzvah in Warsaw and then immigrated with his family to join his father in the United States in 1930. After he graduated from Yeshiva College, he went to law school at New York University and graduated with a law degree in 1946. He then spent the next 20 years teaching at yeshivas in New York City.

Soloveichik's first teaching position was in Mesivtha Tifereth Jerusalem then headed by Moshe Feinstein, from whom he received his semikhah (rabbinic ordination). Shortly thereafter Soloveichik was appointed by Hutner to give the highest daily lecture in Yeshiva Rabbi Chaim Berlin. Soloveichik's final position in New York was at Yeshiva University, where he instituted a weekly hashkafa class in addition to giving one of the advanced daily Talmud classes, and where he was the first rabbi to be named Lecturer of the Year at Yeshiva University.

In 1966, he moved to Chicago to head the Hebrew Theological College in Skokie, Illinois. After differing with the administration there on certain key issues, he was let go in 1974 and opened his own yeshiva as the Rosh Yeshiva of Yeshivas Brisk (Brisk Rabbinical College) in Chicago, an American incarnation of the Brisk yeshivas and methods.

Soloveichik taught Torah for 58 years, the last 34 of which were in Chicago. Although a stroke in 1983 left him partially paralyzed he continued his duties at Yeshivas Brisk in Chicago and flew to New York every week to deliver a Talmudic lecture at Yeshiva University (a position he accepted after his older brother Rabbi Dr. Joseph B. Soloveitchik became ill and was unable to continue lecturing).

His wife, Ella Shurin, was a writer and teacher. The couple raised six children all of whom are rabbis or women married to rabbis.

His grandchildren include Rabbi Dr. Meir Soloveichik (renowned scholar and writer) and Nachama Soloveichik (Communications Director for Senator Pat Toomey and the Nikki Haley 2024 presidential campaign).

== Works ==
Other works in Hebrew include commentaries on the works of Maimonides (Parach Mateh Aharon) and the laws of mourning (Od Yisrael Yosef Beni Chai) which was dedicated in memory of his grandson who died young after a long battle with cancer.

Additional works in English include Logic of the Heart Logic of the Mind - Wisdom and reflections on topics of our times.

== Articles ==
- HaDarom, No. 22, Tisrei 5726 (Oct. 1955): בענין קידוש החודש
- HaDarom, No. 23, Nissan 5726 (April 1956): דין שימור במצות מצוה
- Bais Yitzchak, 1987: בענין יהרג ועל יעבור
