= Yeshiva Toras Moshe =

Yeshivas Toras Moshe
- ישיבת תורת משה

Location
- 20 Ma'aglei Harim Levine St. Sanhedria Murchevet; Jerusalem; Israel
- 31.80304037°N 35.21796322°E

Information
- Established: 1982
- Rosh Yeshiva: Rabbi Moshe Meiselman
- Mashgiach: Rabbi Elchonon Meir Fishman
- Affiliation: Orthodox
- Website: nermichoel.org

Yeshiva Toras Moshe is an English-speaking Litvish Orthodox Yeshiva in Jerusalem. Founded in 1982, it was established in Israel to cater to post-high school students from English-speaking countries. It has since graduated over 1,000 students.

== History ==
The yeshiva was founded in 1982 by Rabbi Moshe Meiselman, a grandson of Rabbi Moshe Soloveichik and nephew and student of Rabbi Joseph B. Soloveitchik, together with Rabbi Doniel Lehrfield, now Rosh yeshiva of Yeshivas Bais Yisroel. Meiselman named the yeshiva after his grandfather Rabbi Moshe Soloveichik (1879–1941). The yeshiva was first housed in Machon Harry Fischel in the Bucharian neighborhood of Jerusalem.

In the early 1990s the Yeshiva moved to the center of Jerusalem in a building founded by the Dean of Yeshivas Novhardok, Rabbi Ben-Zion Brook. In 2009 the yeshiva moved to its own, permanent home in the Sanhedria Murchevet neighborhood. The new three-story building includes a beis medrash, dining hall, dormitories, and basketball court.

=== Staff ===
- Rosh yeshiva: Rabbi Moshe Meiselman
- Mashgiach ruchani: Rabbi Elchonon Meir Fishman, a student of Yeshivat Kerem B'Yavneh, the Navardok yeshiva, and of Rabbi Tzvi Kushelevsky, Rabbi Shlomo Wolbe and Rabbi Shlomo Brevda.

The senior faculty also include another student of Rabbi Joseph B. Soloveitchik: Rabbi Michel Shurkin, as well as Rabbi Yehuda Abramowitz, a student of Rabbi Ahron Soloveichik Rabbi Nochum Partzovitz, & the Novominsker Rebbe and Rabbi Zev Klein, a student of Rabbi Abba Berman. Rabbi Shurkin has written three volumes of transcriptions of the Talmud lectures of Rabbi Joseph Soloveitchik.

One of the senior faculty, Rabbi Mosheh Twersky, was murdered along with four others in a terrorist attack on the morning of 18 November 2014 while praying in the Kehilat Bnei Torah synagogue in Har Nof, in the 2014 Jerusalem synagogue massacre.

== Studies ==
=== Students ===
All of the students are English-speaking. The vast majority come from all parts of the United States. There is also a large amount of English boys, and some South Africans and Canadians. Reb Reuven Schwartz who is an author of over 70 Seforim is an alumnus.

In keeping with the yeshiva's philosophy of building personal connections between staff and students, many alumni remain connected to the yeshiva after graduation. Some yeshiva lecturers send copies of their shiurim (Torah lectures) to current and former students, while the yeshiva hosts regular reunions and fund-raising gatherings. In 2009 the yeshiva took both current and former students on a trip to the former Torah centers of Brisk and Volozhin to mark the 80th anniversary of the arrival of Rabbi Moshe Soloveitchik in America.

=== Institutional Philosophy ===
Toras Moshe emphasizes full-time immersion in Torah study.

Toras Moshe is not per se opposed to college studies so long as they are purely for vocational purposes, and many of its alumni hold jobs that require a college or other vocational degree.

The schedule is standard for a traditional orthodox yeshiva. The students study for ten and a half hours daily, which includes Talmud, Mussar, and Halacha. In addition to this, most students learn an extended amount of time on their own or with study partners (chavrusas) beyond the required amounts. Several times a week the students hear a lecture, or vaad, from the mashgiach in Mussar or a lecture in Halacha from either Rabbi Sinowitz, Rabbi Raymon, or Rabbi Weiner.

The academic philosophy is founded on the classic concept of Torah Lishmah and is centered on mastery of the Talmud. There are many different classes for a student to choose from in the yeshiva. The yeshiva is split into two tracks for three years worth of courses, though many stay longer. After three years students can apply for a Bachelor of Liberal Arts degree. Toras Moshe also offers a graduate program designed for students who have finished many years of Talmudic study and are preparing for a career in Judaic and/or Talmudic studies.
