= Migdal Oz (seminary) =

Modern Orthodox Judaism institution

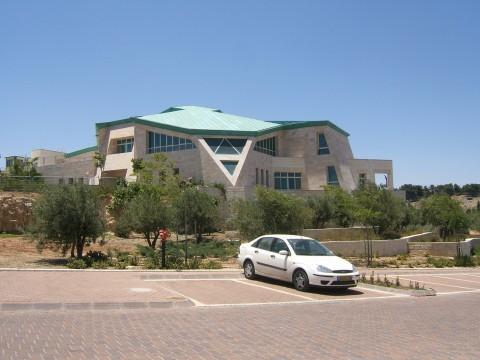
Beit Midrash of Migdal Oz

Stella K. Abraham Beit Midrash for Women, commonly known as Migdal Oz (Hebrew: בית מדרש לנשים מגדל עז), is a Modern Orthodox institution of higher Torah study for women located in the Kibbutz Migdal Oz in Gush Etzion in the West Bank.

== Overview ==
Migdal Oz is the sister school of Yeshivat Har Etzion, sharing its general philosophy, leadership and many faculty members. The total student population is 180, including 30 from the U.S., Canada, and England, and more than 40 in the advanced teachers' training program. The director of Migdal Oz is Rabbanit Esti Rosenberg, whose father, Rabbi Aharon Lichtenstein, along with Rabbi Yehuda Amital, provided the school with rabbinic guidance and often made religious policy decisions. The current Mashgicha Ruchanit is Rabbanit Shayna Goldberg. The curriculum includes Talmud study in keeping with the halakhic rulings of Rosenberg's grandfather, Rabbi Joseph B. Soloveitchik. Notable alumni include: Elana Stein Hain and Gilah Kletenik.

== History ==
Migdal Oz was established in 1997 by Yeshivat Har Etzion. It was located in a trailer which now serves as the kibbutz's sewing room. A permanent building with a study hall, classrooms, and a dining hall, was completed in 2003.

The program began as a framework for Israeli high school graduates prior to doing Sherut Leumi or prior to serving in the Israel Defense Forces. Since then, it has expanded to include women who have completed their national service, as well as foreign students. Many combine their studies at Migdal Oz with the Teacher Training Program of Herzog College.

== See also ==
- Yeshivat Har Etzion
- Torah study
- Religious Zionism
