= List of commentaries on Mishneh Torah =

List of commentaries on Maimonides' Mishneh Torah:

== Before 1800s ==
Name of Work	Author	Location of First Printing	Publication Date
Hasagot HaRamach	Moshe HaKohen MeLunil
Hasagot HaRaavad	Abraham ben David	Provence	c.1150 – c.1190
Migdal Oz	Shem Tov ibn Gaon	Spain	c.1298 – c.1322
HaMenucha	Manoaḥ of Narbonne		c. 14th century
Ba'alei Elsha'rach	Combined commentary of the "Men of Elsha'rach"	Unprinted	Manuscripts written in Yemen between 13th-16th centuries
Hagahot Maimoniot	Rabbi Meir ben Rabbi Yekusiel HaKohen	Constantinople	c. 1509
Maggid Mishneh	Vidal of Tolosa	Constantinople	1509
Kiryat Sefer	Moses ben Joseph di Trani	Venice	1551
Kessef Mishneh	Yosef Karo	Venice	1574
Yad Hamelech	Elazar Segal Landau	Venice	1586
Lechem Mishneh	Abraham de Boton	Venice	1609
Mishneh LaMelech	Yehudah Rosanes	Constantinople	c.1675 – c.1715
Merkevet HaMishneh	Shlomo ben Moshe of Chełm	Frankfurt (Oder)	1751
Yekar Tiferet	David ben Solomon	Hafla'ah and Zeraim in Smyrna; remaining portions in Vilna	Hafla'ah and Zeraim 1757; remaining portions 1890

== 1800s — present ==
Name of Work	Author	Location of First Printing	Publication Date
Chiddushim v'Hagahot HaGRI''V	Isaiah Berlin	Dyhernfurth	1809
Divrei David	David ben Solomon	Livorno	1828
Tzofnat Paneach	Yosef Rosen	Piotrków Trybunalski - Warsaw	c. 1902
Ohr Somayach	Meir Simcha of Dvinsk	Riga	1925
Even HaEzel	Isser Zalman Meltzer	Jerusalem	c. 1935
Chiddushei Rabbeinu Chaim	Chaim Soloveitchik	Brest	1936
Perush Makif shel Mori Yosef Qafih	Yosef Qafih
Rambam La'Am	Shmuel Tanchum Rubinstein	Mossad Harav Kook, Jerusalem	1971
Iyyunim BaMishneh Torah LeHaRambam	Jose Faur	Mossad Harav Kook, Jerusalem	1978
Chiddushei Maran Riz Halevi	Yitzchok Zev Soloveitchik	Jerusalem	1979
Hadranim al HaRambam	Menachem Mendel Schneerson	Kehot Publication Society, Brooklyn, New York	1992
Yad Peshuta	Nahum Rabinovitch	Machon Ma'aliot, Ma'ale Adumim	1996–2010
Biyur al Mishneh Torah LeRambam	Adin Steinsaltz	Koren Publishers, Jerusalem	2017
Chiddushei Rabbeinu Meshulam Dovid Halevi Al HaRambam	Meshulam Dovid Soloveitchik	Jerusalem	2021
