= Jacob Rabinowitz =

Jacob Rabinowitz may refer to:

- Jacob Rabinowitz (editor), co-editor of the magazine Factsheet Five
- Jacob J. Rabinowitz, professor of law
