= Abraham Sfej =

Rabbinical author

Abraham Sfej (Hebrew: אברהם צפיג, romanized: Avraham Tsfig; early 18th century – 1784) was an 18th-century rabbinical author. He left his native city of Tunis and settled in Jerusalem, sojourning for a time in Constantinople. He died in Amsterdam while raising money there for the Jewish community of Jerusalem.

== Publications ==
- 'Ene Abraham (Amsterdam, 1784), a commentary on the Yad ha-Ḥazakah of Maimonides.
