= Hadranim al HaRambam =

Chabad book

Toras Menachem: Hadranim al HaRambam V'Shas
- Author: Rabbi Menachem Mendel Schneerson, the seventh Rebbe of Chabad
- Published: 1992, Brooklyn (Kehot Publication Society)
- OCLC: 19167748

Toras Menachem: Hadranim al HaRambam V'Shas (or Hadranim al HaRambam) is a collection of Rabbi Menachem Mendel Schneerson's commentary on Mishneh Torah and the Talmud. The book contains pilpuls on the ending passages of the Rambam. The book combines Nigla and Chassidus in its approach to the text.

== Publishing ==
The book was first published by Kehot Publication Society in 1992 and was republished in 2000.

== See also ==
- Hadran (Talmud)
- List of commentaries on Mishneh Torah
- Maimonides
