= Chiddushei Rabbeinu Chaim =

Mishneh Torah commentary by Chaim Soloveitchik

Chiddushei Rabbeinu Chaim HaLevi Al-HaRambam (Hebrew: חידושי רבינו חיים הלוי על הרמב"ם, lit. Our Rabbi Chaim the Levite's Novellae on Maimonides) is a volume of commentary by Rabbi Chaim Soloveitchik on Maimonides’ Mishneh Torah. It also contains original commentary on the Talmud. There are 155 pieces in the work, with some themes overlapping through multiple pieces. Soloveitchik was the founder of the Brisker Derech (also known as Lomdus, a conceptual approach to Talmudic study), and was known for reconciling contradictions in Maimonides' writings. The text was written in a very terse style whose intricacy is difficult even for those very familiar with the Brisker Derech, and was written for those already on a very advanced level of Talmudic and Halachic study. Rabbi Chaim’s son Rabbi Moshe Soloveichik first printed it posthumously in 1936, he stated in the preface that his father wrote it with extreme precision, having “sifted the text seven times over and winnowed it a hundred times more.” Some years later a commentary on Chiddushei Rabbeinu Chaim was written by Rabbi Chaim's student Rabbi Yehezkel Abramsky.

== See also ==
- List of commentaries on Mishneh Torah
- Maimonides
- Brisker Method
- Soloveitchik Dynasty
