= Moshe Shmuel Glasner =

Hungarian Talmudic scholar and communal leader

Rabbi Moshe Shmuel Glasner
- משה שמואל גלזנר
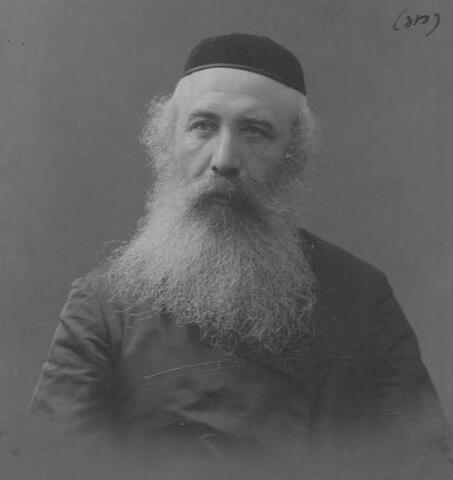
- Rabbi Moshe Shmuel Glasner

Chief Rabbi of Klausenburg

Personal life
- Born: February 27, 1856 Pressburg, Kingdom of Hungary
- Died: October 19, 1924 (aged 68) Jerusalem, Mandatory Palestine
- Children: Rabbi Akiva Glasner
- Parent(s): Rabbi Avraham Glasner, Raizl Ehrenfeld
- Known for: Author of Dor Revi'i, supporter of Zionism, founder of Mizrachi
- Occupation: Rabbi

Religious life
- Religion: Judaism
- Denomination: Orthodox

oRabbi Moshe Shmuel Glasner (27 February 1856 - 19 October 1924), a Hungarian Talmudic scholar and communal leader, served as chief rabbi of Klausenburg (Kolozsvár in Hungarian, Cluj in Romanian) from 1877 to 1923. In 1923 he left Klausenburg for Jerusalem where he resided until his death in 1924. He is best known as the author of Dor Revi'i, a classic commentary on the tractate Hullin, and as a supporter of Zionism and a founder of Mizrachi.

His father was Rabbi Avraham Glasner (1825–1877), who preceded him as chief rabbi of Klausenburg, and was his only teacher. His mother, Raizl (née Ehrenfeld), was the oldest granddaughter of the Chatam Sofer.

He was born in Pressburg, Hungary in February 1856, and died in Jerusalem in 1924, less than a year after his aliyah in May 1923.

== Method of study ==
He was noted for his independence as a halakhic authority. He advocated a return to the method of study of the Rishonim (pre-1500 CE rabbinic scholars) which the introduction to the Dor Revi'i states "was to explain with crystal clearness, to examine, to search for truth without any respect for any person"; he opposed the method of pilpul (casuistry) that arose during the era of the Acharonim (post-1500 CE scholars), saying pilpul is "as far from the path of wisdom as East is from West" (id.) and "a weakness developed in the Galut during whose millennia of persecutions and migrations our capacity for straight thinking had been well-nigh destroyed." Similarly, in his monograph "Ohr Bahir" (on the laws of mikva'ot), he rejected halakhic reasoning based on esoteric sources or divine inspiration, arguing that only arguments that can be subjected to rational criticism and evaluated in terms of halakhic sources known to halakhic experts at large carry weight in arriving at halakhic decisions.

His work also developed a method of understanding and applying the code of Maimonides (Rambam). Many codifications of the Rambam were said by commentators to be at odds with the relevant Talmudic sources. These seemingly anomalous rulings have led to attempts at rationalization by later scholars. Rabbi Glasner suggested that the source of the difficulty was often that the scholars had assumed that the Rambam had interpreted the problematic Talmudic sources of the codification in the same way that the Franco-German school of Rashi and Tosafot had understood those sources. However, Rabbi Glasner maintained, there was usually another approach to understanding the Talmudic sources than that followed by Rashi and Tosafot, often stemming from the Babylonian Geonic school, which the Rambam had followed in reaching his codification. Rabbi Glasner's methods coincided with those of Lithuanian Rabbi Haim Soloveichik. When Rabbi Glasner's major work, Dor Revi'i, came to the attention of the Lithuanian yeshivot in the late 1920s and early 1930s, it surprised many Lithuanian scholars that a rabbi from Hungary (where theoretical acuity was generally less emphasized than breadth of knowledge of the sources) had independently formulated a method of study so similar to the method of Rabbi Soloveichik.

== Zionist activity ==
Rabbi Glasner supported Zionism, which was highly unusual among the Hungarian Orthodox rabbinate. A founder of Mizrachi (religious Zionism), he became personally close to Rabbi Abraham Isaac Kook, especially after taking up residence in Jerusalem in 1923. His independence and in particular his outspoken Zionism led to his estrangement from many of his rabbinical colleagues in Hungary. After the First World War, he increased his efforts in support of the Zionist enterprise. His "Zionism in the Light of the Faith" is the primary source for his philosophy of Zionism. He criticized his colleagues in the Hungarian rabbinate for not supporting Zionism while proclaiming themselves to be nothing more than Hungarians of the Mosaic faith. In 1921 he represented Mizrachi at the 12th World Zionist Congress in Carlsbad, and he undertook speaking tours on behalf of Zionism. His outspoken support of Zionism caused elements of the Orthodox community in Klausenburg to break away from the community that he had headed for over 40 years. In 1923, Rabbi Glasner retired from his position as chief rabbi and was succeeded by his son, Rabbi Akiva Glasner. In his farewell address to his community at the Klausenburg train station as he left for Palestine, he called for his listeners to follow him to Palestine while they still could, because he greatly feared that they would eventually want to leave Europe to go to Palestine but would no longer be able to.

See further under "Philosophy of the Oral Law and Zionism" below.

== Dor Revi'i ==
Rabbi Glasner's most notable work is Dor Revi'i (New York: Im haSefer, 2004), a commentary on mesechet (tractate) Hullin, which largely concerns the laws of shehitah (ritual slaughter) and other aspects of Jewish dietary laws. The work analyzes the laws of shehitah in the context of a dispute between Rabbi Akiva and Rabbi Yishmael at Hullin 16b-17a about the interpretation of the verses in Deuteronomy (12:20-21) that state for the first time (just prior to the entry into the promised land) an obligation to perform shehitah on hullin (animals not offered as sacrifices). R. Yishmael interprets the verses to mean that for the preceding forty years the Israelites had been forbidden to eat any animal not offered as a sacrifice. However, R. Akiva states that the verses mean that prior to entry into the promised land the Israelites had been allowed to eat non-sacrificial meat by performing nehirah, a minimal form of ritual slaughter that was superseded by the obligation to perform shehitah which had previously been reserved for sacrifices. Although all the standard commentaries interpret the verses in Deuteronomy in accord with the opinion of R. Yishmael, the Rambam in his code (Hilkhot Shehitah 4:17) rules according to the opinion of Rabbi Akiva. In Dor Revi'i, Rabbi Glasner explains the opinions of R. Yishmael and R. Akiva as well as the various interpretations of the dispute by Rashi, the Tosafot and the Rambam and links this dispute to others in the rest of the tractate.

== Philosophy of the Oral Law and Zionism ==
Apart from its importance as a traditional Talmudic commentary, Dor Revi'i is also noteworthy because of the philosophy of the Oral Law that is expounded in the introduction (hakdamah) to the work. A distinct philosophical essay is contained in the conclusion of his comprehensive introductory statement (petihah) of the ten main halakhic principles of ritual slaughter (shehitah) that underlie the main halakhic discussion of the tractate. The latter essay argues that the Torah presupposes basic principles of morality that are incumbent on all human beings independently of any explicit commandment (e.g., a prohibition against eating human flesh). In the hakdamah, Rabbi Glasner develops a philosophy in which halakhah is seen not as the pure expression of Divine Will, but as a creative process in which man is an active participant. Halakhah is the outgrowth of an evolving tradition that encompasses the attempts of the Sages of each generation to apply Divinely sanctioned principles of interpretation to the Written text received at Sinai. That process of interpreting the written text and applying it to ever-changing circumstances constitutes the Oral Law or Tradition. The Oral Law cannot remain static and unchanging. Nor was it intended by the Divine Author of Written Law that the Oral Law be static. Indeed, the dynamic nature of the Tradition was imbedded in the Oral Law by the ancient prohibition against writing down the rulings of the Oral Law in an authoritative text. As long as the Oral Law was transmitted orally and not in writing, later authorities had the right to overturn the rulings of their predecessors that were predicated on a particular interpretation of the Scriptures (Maimonides Mishneh Torah, Hilchot Mamrim 2:1-2). This purely oral transmission of the Oral Law ensured its flexibility and adaptability to changing circumstances. However, the right of later authorities to change the rulings of earlier authorities was radically circumscribed when the prohibition against writing down the Oral Law in a canonical text was abrogated by Rabbi Judah the Prince (second century of the common era) in order to produce the Mishnah. The justification for abrogating the prohibition against creating an authoritative text of the Oral Law was that the onset of the Diaspora would make preserving the Oral Law as it had been known previously impossible. Only through the creation of an authoritative text could the integrity of halakhah be maintained under the unprecedented conditions of prolonged exile in the absence of any supreme halakhic authority. But the resulting ossification of the Oral Law owing to the combined effects of exile, persecution and an authoritative written text was seen as distinct from the process of halakhic evolution and development which Rabbi Glasner believed was the Divine intention. It was from this philosophical perspective that he conceived of using Zionism for restoring the Oral Law to its ancient position as the means by which Jewish people in each generation could find concrete expression.

A similar philosophy of the Oral Law, also emphasizing the distinction between written and oral transmission, was subsequently articulated in several works by Rabbi Eliezer Berkovits, who was a student of Rabbi Glasner's son and successor as chief rabbi of Klausenburg Rabbi Akiva Glasner.

== Character and personality ==
Rabbi Glasner was embroiled in controversies in his tenure as chief rabbi of Klausenburg. He responded to his critics by seeking to demonstrate, through the force of his own arguments, the validity of his position. At the end of his haqdamah to Dor Revi'i, he summarized his approach. "The reader of this work should not suspect that I would imagine that in every place that I have criticized rabbis who came before us, I have discerned the truth, for such a haughty spirit would be incomparably ignorant ... [I]t would contradict my approach completely, for my having dared to criticize is built on the principle that every person ... is liable to err ... [Others] will undoubtedly find many mistakes that I have made, because man is biased in favor of his own words and ideas. I, too, could not be secure from the snare of error that lies beneath the feet of all men. But this is the way of the Torah: one builds and another comes after and examines his words and removes the chaff from the wheat in order to find truth, which is beloved above all" (haqdamah 5a-b).

== Other works ==
Rabbi Glasner also published Shevivei Eish, a shorter work of commentary on the weekly Torah reading and the Festivals (translated in Resources below) which also includes novellae on various discussions in the Talmud and codifications in Maimonides Code.

He also published five short halakhic monographs: Ohr Bahir (1908) on the laws of purity and mikvaot; Halakhah l'Moshe (1908) and Yeshnah li-Shehitah on shehitah; Haqor Davar (1908) on conversion in cases of intermarriage; Matzah Shemurah on matzot for Passover. These works were republished in a single volume called Ohr Bahir (2008).

He wrote an essay (German) on Zionism, Der Zionismus und seine Nebenerscheinungen im Lichte der Religion (Klausenburg, 1920). The work was translated into Hebrew as haTzionut b'Ohr haEmuna and published in a volume edited by Simon Federbusch, Torah u-Meluhah (Jerusalem: Mosad haRav Kook, 1961). An English translation, Zionism in the Light of Faith is available online (see Resources).

Rabbi Glasner wrote manuscripts, including novellae on most of the Talmud and hundreds of responsa, whose whereabouts are now unknown. About 200 of his responsa dating from the late 1880s through the 1890s were recovered and published posthumously (She'eilot u-Teshuvot Dor Revi'i, two volumes). He was also a frequent contributor to the rabbinic journal Tel Talpiot.
