= Mantsur Marzuk =

Mantsur Marzuk (Hebrew: מנצור מרזוק) was an Egyptian rabbi and author, who settled at Salonica toward the end of the 18th century.

== Works ==
- Ẓur Todah. Salonica. 1783. A commentary on the Yad ha-Ḥazaḳah.
- Ben Pedahẓur. Salonica. 1786. A collection of sermons.
- Ḳorban Eliẓur. A Talmudic commentary.
