= Eliezer Berkovits =

German-American-Israeli rabbi and scholar

Rabbi Eliezer Berkovits
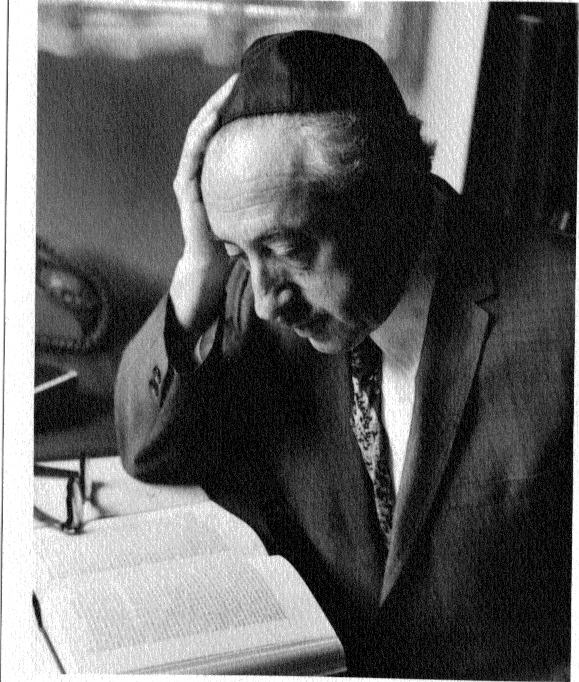

Rabbi in Berlin
- In office 1934–1939

Rabbi in Leeds, England
- In office 1940–1946

Rabbi in Sydney, Australia
- In office 1946–1950

Rabbi in Boston
- In office 1950–1958

Personal life
- Born: 8 September 1908 Nagyvárad, Austria-Hungary
- Died: August 22, 1992 (aged 83) Jerusalem, Israel
- Education: Hildesheimer Rabbinical Seminary, University of Berlin
- Occupation: Rabbi, theologian, educator

Religious life
- Religion: Judaism
- Denomination: Orthodox

Jewish leader
- Awards: National Jewish Book Award (1975)

Eliezer Berkovits (8 September 1908, Nagyvárad, Austria-Hungary – 20 August 1992, Jerusalem) was a rabbi, theologian, and educator in the tradition of Orthodox Judaism.

== Life ==
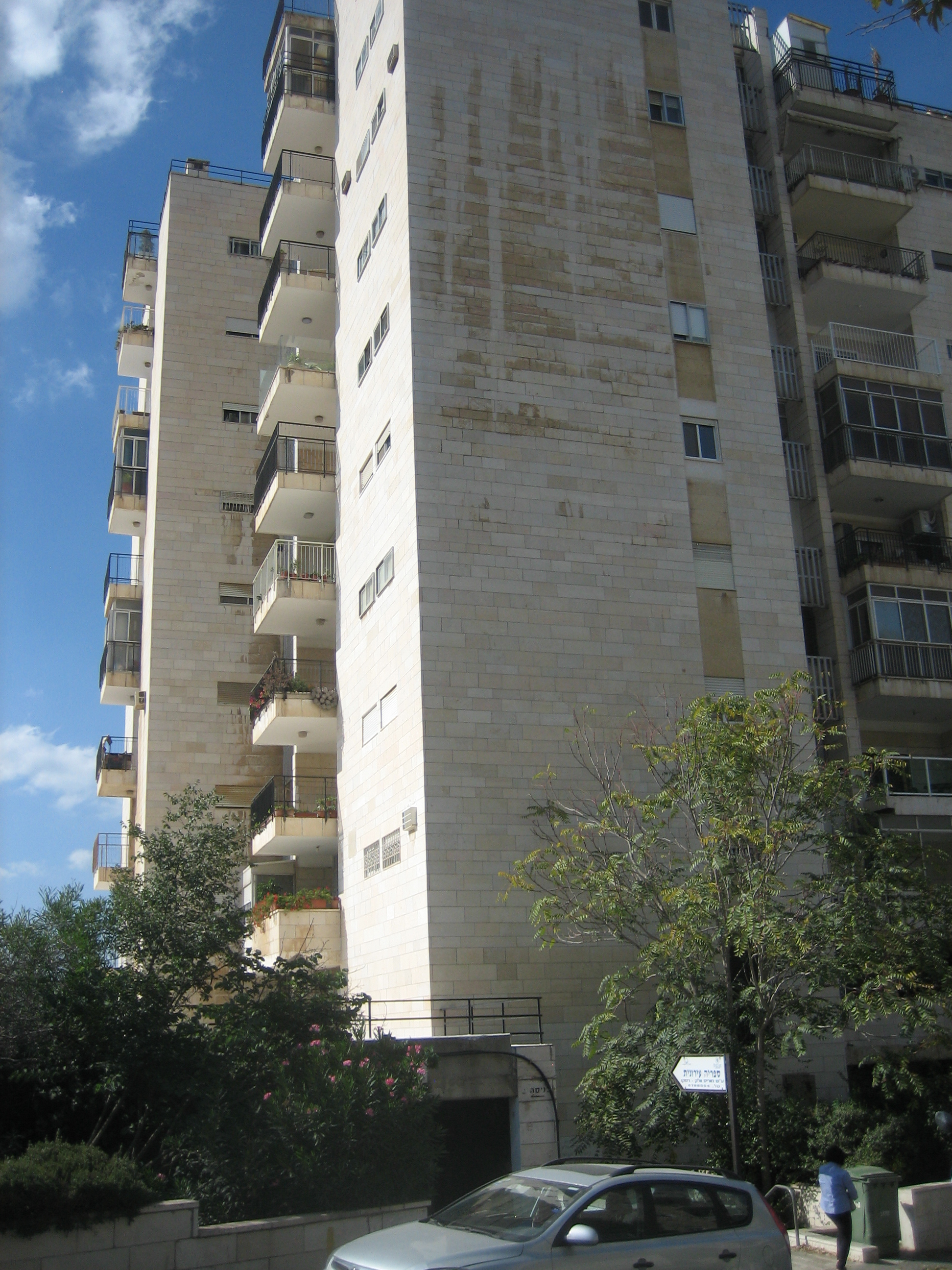
Building, where Berkovits lived in Jerusalem: Shimoni Street 4

Berkovits received his rabbinical training first under Rabbi Akiva Glasner, son of Rabbi Moshe Shmuel Glasner, the Dor Revi'i, including semikhah, and then at the Hildesheimer Rabbinical Seminary in Berlin as a disciple of Rabbi Yechiel Weinberg, a recognized scholar of Jewish law. He received his Ph.D. in philosophy from the University of Berlin. He served in the rabbinates of Berlin (1934–1939), Leeds (1940–1946), Sydney (1946–50), and Boston (1950–1958). In 1958, he became chairman of the department of Jewish philosophy of the Hebrew Theological College in Skokie, Illinois. In 1976, at age 67, he and his family immigrated to Israel, where he taught and lectured until his death in 1992.

Berkovits wrote 19 books in English, Hebrew, and German, and lectured extensively in those languages. His writings deal with basic issues of Jewish faith, spirituality, and law in a creative dialogue between religion and modernity, with an emphasis on Halakha in the affairs of the Jewish state and on Halakha concerning Jewish marriage and women. His thought is, in essence, a philosophy of morality and history for contemporary Jewish society.

== Philosophy ==
The core of his theology is the encounter as an actual meeting of God and human at Mount Sinai. The encounter is paradoxical in that it transcends human comprehension, yet it demonstrates that God cares about human beings. He teaches that once human beings know God cares for them, they can act in ways that seek meaning, accept responsibility for their actions, and act with righteousness toward others. This implies the keeping of the commandments, ethical concern for others, and building the State of Israel. From "The Paradox of the Encounter" in God, Man, and History (1965):

God's presence seems to be threatening; it imperils the life of the person to whom it wishes to communicate itself... Standing at the mountain of Sinai, the children of Israel trembled with fear at the voice of God, which yet was conferring on them their greatest distinction... The peril that emanates from "contact" with the Divine Presence, has nothing to do either with the sinfulness of man or with the judgment of the Almighty. It is something quite "natural", almost "physical", if one may say so. A man wilts in the heat of the midday sun, or dies of exhaustion if he is exposed too long to cold weather. Often mere lightning and thunder or the tempest of the elements frighten him. How, then, dare he hope to stand in the presence of the ultimate source of all energy and all power in the cosmos; how dare he approach it and survive!... Thus we are faced with a strange paradox. The God of religion, we have found must be a living one. And a living God is one who stands in relationship to the world, i.e., a God who not only is but is also for man, as it were, who is concerned about man... Now we find that the encounter threatens the very existence of man.., there can be no religion without some active relationship between man and God; in the relationship, however, man cannot survive.

The paradox is resolved by God, when He "shows" Himself to man. God, who reveals His "unbearable" Presence to the helpless creature, also sustains man in the act of revelation... Man is threatened and affirmed at the same time. Through the peril that confronts him, he is bound to recognize his nothingness before God; yet, in the divine affirmation, the highest conceivable dignity is bestowed upon him: he is allowed into fellowship with God... The dual nature of man, which emerges in the basic religious experience, found its classical formulation in the words of the Psalmist, when he explained: "What is man, that thou are mindful of him? And the son of man, that Thou thinkest of him? Yet Thou hast made him but lower than the angels, and hast crowned him with glory and honor." Man, who is "dust and ashes" and is yet "crowned with glory and honor' is the corollary to God, whose throne is the heaven and footstool is the earth and who yet looks on him who is "poor and of a contrite spirit"... Through the encounter Judaism first learned of God, who is almighty and yet cares for man, Supreme Lord and yet a friend.

Berkovits also insisted that God must be an Agent independent from Man, in opposition to pantheistic or panentheistic notions of "all is in God" or "God is in all". On Berkovits' analysis, such notions run completely contrary to the foundations of the Jewish faith. For a religious relationship of any kind to exist, at the very least there must be separation between man and God. Thus, notions of "mystical union" must be utterly rejected:

God addresses himself to man, and he awaits man's response to the address. God speaks and man listens; God commands, and man obeys. Man searches, and God allows himself to be found; man entreats and God answers. In the mystical union, however, there are no words and no law, no search and no recognition, because there is no separateness.

== Holocaust philosophy ==
After the Holocaust, Berkovits asserted that God's "absence" in Nazi Germany should be explained through the classical concept of hester panim, "the hiding of the divine face." Berkovits claimed that in order for God to maintain His respect and care for humanity as a whole, He necessarily had to withdraw Himself and allow human beings—even the most cruel and vicious—to exercise their free will. In light of this autonomy, a tremendous responsibility is cast on Human beings. Due to the role of Christianity in the Holocaust Berkovits rejected interreligious dialogue with Christians. Nevertheless, Berkovits emphasized the importance of having a shared human basis: "Human beings ought to treat each other with respect and hold each other dear independently of theological dialogues, Biblical studies, and independently of what they believe about each other's religion. I am free to reject any religion as humbug if that is what I think of it; but I am duty-bound to respect the dignity of every human being no matter what I may think of his religion. It is not inter-religious understanding that mankind needs but inter-human understanding – an understanding based on our common humanity and wholly independent of any need for common religious beliefs and theological principles." (“Judaism in the Post-Christian Era”, Judaism 15:1, Winter 1966, p. 82)

== Theory of Halakhah and Halakhic change, oral law (Torah She'be'al Peh) ==
In Berkovits' view, Halakhah is determined by (1) the priority of the ethical in the value system of Judaism as reflected in the entire range of Jewish sacred literature, (2) common sense, (3) the wisdom of the feasible in the light of reality. In Not in Heaven he states that "in the spiritual realm nothing fails like compulsion" Yet, "Autonomy degenerates into everyone doing his own thing. The result is social and international decadence" (p. 83). Berkovits sees Judaism and halakhah as being inextricably intertwined, halakhah and our relationship to it having indeed shaped Judaism. "Through Halakhah the Word from Sinai has become the way of life of the Jewish people through history" (p. 84). He therefore sees a normative role for halakhah even in the modern world: "There has never been a greater need for Halakhah's creative wisdom of Torah-application to the daily realities of human existence than in our day" (p. 2).

Related to this is Rabbi Berkovits's view of the Oral Law (Torah She'be'al Peh), the traditional Jewish conception of the oral explanation of the Torah, given at Sinai along with the Written Torah. This Oral Torah includes both explicit interpretations of certain Pentateuchal laws, as well as the general methods of Rabbinic exegesis. In Berkovits's view, the Oral Law was oral in order to allow maximum flexibility, by giving the rabbis of each generation the ability to decide questions of new situations and circumstances and even re-decide anew the questions of previous generations. When the Oral Law was written (chiefly in the Mishna and Talmud), the rabbis viewed this as so catastrophic and unprecedented and controversial because this killed much of the Oral Law's flexibility that was so inherent to its nature; by writing it down, decisions were set in stone and could not be redecided. This was necessary to prevent its being forgotten due to the tribulations of Roman rule and exile, but it had its price. In addition, Rabbi Berkovits saw Zionism as a means to revitalize in the Jewish people what was lost with the Oral Law's writing.

== Women in Jewish law ==
Berkovits was critical of the lack of rights a married Jewish woman has in relation to her husband in issues of marriage and divorce. Rabbi Prof. David Hartman said in a March 2009 lecture about Berkovits that Berkovits was deeply concerned with the treatment of women in Jewish life, law, and practice. He affirmed the equity of women and men within the institution of Jewish marriage, but never advocated any abrogation of existing Jewish law.

Berkovits called for the ethical courage on the part of Jewish legal authorities to put what already exists in principle into practice. He was a major inspiration for many traditional Jewish women who sought to carve out a more equitable position within the boundaries of the Jewish law.

== Works ==
- Hume and Deism (1933) [German]
- What is the Talmud? (1938) [German]
- Towards Historic Judaism (1943)
- Between Yesterday and Tomorrow (1945)
- Judaism: Fossil or Ferment? (1956)
- God, Man, and History (1959)
- Prayer (1962)
- A Jewish Critique of the Philosophy of Martin Buber (1962)
- T'nai Bi'N'suin u'V'Get (1966) [Hebrew]
- Man and God: Studies in Biblical Theology (1969)
- Faith After the Holocaust (1973)
- Major Themes in Modern Philosophies of Judaism (1974)
- Crisis and Faith (1976)
- With God in Hell: Judaism in the Ghettos and Death Camps (1979)
- Not in Heaven: The Nature and Function of Halakha (1983)
- HaHalakha, Koha V'Tafkida (1981) [Hebrew] - expanded version of Not in Heaven (above)
- Logic in Halacha (1986) [Hebrew]
- Unity in Judaism (1986)
- The Crisis of Judaism in the Jewish State (1987) [Hebrew]
- Jewish Women in Time and Torah (1990)
- Essential Essays on Judaism (2002), ed. David Hazony
- Faith and Freedom Passover Haggadah with Commentary From the Writings of Rabbi Eliezer Berkovits (2019), ed. Reuven Mohl
- Faith Fulfilled: Megillat Esther and the Ma'ariv Evening Service for Purim with Commentary From the Writings of Rabbi Eliezer Berkovits (2022), ed. Reuven Mohl

== Awards ==
- 1975: National Jewish Book Award in the Jewish Thought category for Major Themes in Modern Philosophies of Judaism
