= Aaron ben Meir of Brest =

Aaron ben Meir of Brest was a Belarusian rabbi; born about the beginning of the eighteenth century at Brest-Litovsk, Belarus; died there November 3, 1777. He was a descendant of the family of Katzenellenbogen-Padua, and received his Talmudical instruction from Eliezer ben Eliezer Kolir, a well-known Pilpulist and the author of a number of rabbinical works.

Aaron carried the Pilpul method to its extreme limits, and was the author of "Minḥat Aharon" (Aaron's Offering, Novydvor, 1792), a work containing glosses on the Talmudic treatise Sanhedrin, and a masterpiece of rabbinical dialectics (Pilpul). At the end of the work is an appendix, called "Minḥah Belulah," which contains responsa and commentaries on Talmudic topics. Some of his responsa may be found in the "Meḳor Mayim Ḥayyim" (Sudilkov, 1836), a work by his grandson, Jacob Meir of Padua. Aaron's father was one of the leaders (allufim) of the Jewish community of Brest-Litovsk; and his signature is attached to a letter sent in 1752 by that community to Jonathan Eybeschütz assuring him of their support in his dispute with Emden.
