= Shabsai Frankel =

Shabsai Frankel (Hebrew: שבתי פרנקל, Yiddish: שבתי פרענקל; August 13, 1909 – September 30, 2000) was a rabbi, businessman, philanthropist, and publisher of Torah books.

His father, Rabbi Yosef Frankel was a prominent Gerrer Hasid in Poland whose son Alexander married a granddaughter of Rabbi Avraham Mordechai Alter, the Gerrer Rebbe. Rabbi Shabsai married the daughter of Rabbi Yosef Nechemya Kornitzer, who was a great grandson of the Chasam Sofer and the Chief Rabbinical Justice in Kraków.

During World War II, Rabbi Shabsai fled Poland for Vilna, Lithuania. From there, he eventually immigrated to the United States. In America, Rabbi Shabsai joined with the likes of Rabbi Refael Reuvain Grozovsky in helping save European Jews from the horrors of the Holocaust. In 1970, after succeeding in business, Rabbi Shabsai moved to Israel to fulfill his lifelong dream: He wished to publish a new, corrected edition of the Rambam's Mishneh Torah. Many of the Gedolim there helped Rabbi Shabsai realize his mission.

Rabbi Shabsai established an elite Kollel of select Talmudic scholars who would actually put together the new print of Maimonides' works as well as a comprehensive index of various other rabbinical commentaries and citations who dealt with Maimonides' rulings. Rabbi Shabsai funded this Kollel from his own fortune. The first volume was printed in 1973 and the last was finished in 2007. Even before the work was completed, The Shabtai Frankel edition of Maimonides' works gained fame and recognition in the yeshiva world (although it was initially softly criticised by Rabbi Berel Soloveitchik).

As part of his ambitious endeavor, Rabbi Shabsai received a blessing from Rabbi Yaakov Yisrael Kanievsky who said that Rabbi Shabsai should merit to live seeing all the volumes of his edition published. Nonetheless, when Rabbi Frankel took a break from printing his edition of Maimonides' works and instead invested in comprehensive indices from the tractates Bava Kamma and Bava Basra, he died on Rosh Hashana, 2000, at the age of 91.

His index on Bava Basra was printed after his death and was named in his memory "Raza D'Shabsai".
