= Vidal of Tolosa =

14th-century rabbi

Vidal of Tolosa, alternate spelling Vidal de Toulouse (Hebrew: וידאל די טולושא), was a Spanish rabbi and scholar of the late 14th century, and is often referred to by the sobriquet, Harav Ha-Maggid, or the Maggid Mishneh, named for his magnum opus by that name.

== Biography ==
From his name it would appear that his origin was a place called Tolosa. The Hida and others wrote that he was from Tolosa, Spain; while modern scholar Israel Netanel Rubin placed his origin at Toulouse. He lived in Villefranche-de-Conflent and later in Barcelona, where he met Nissim of Gerona and published Maggid Mishneh. From Joseph Caro's preface to his Kesef Mishneh it appears that Vidal was a personal friend of Nissim of Gerona.

Vidal's son Isaac was also a prominent scholar, who lived in Alcala and corresponded with Isaac ben Sheshet (according to Isaac ben Sheshet's responsa, number 473).

== Writings ==
=== Maggid Mishneh ===
His most important work was Maggid Mishneh, a commentary on Maimonides' Mishneh Torah. This work covered the entire Mishneh Torah, but by 1906 only those parts were extant which cover the following books: 3 (Zemanim), 4 (Nashim), 5 (Kedusha) (chapters 1-9 only), 11 (Nezikim), 12 (Kinyan) (chapters 1-3 only), and 13 (Mishpatim).

It is considered one of the most important commentaries on Mishneh Torah. When there is a halachic dispute regarding the proper understanding of the Mishneh Torah, it is common to rule according to the understanding of the Maggid Mishneh. In addition, Vidal's approach is commonly held to reflect that of Shlomo ibn Aderet, so that when there is dispute over the meaning of Aderet's words, it is common to rule according to the Vidal's understanding.

Before the twentieth century, the commentary was never published separately, but only together with the Mishneh Torah (first at Constantinople, 1509).

=== Other works ===
According to the Jewish Encyclopedia, Vidal's second work was a commentary in Arabic on a work by Al-Ghazali that is known in Hebrew as To'elet ha-Higgayon (Hebrew: תועלת ההגיון). This commentary was translated into Hebrew by Moses ben Joshua of Narbonne, and as of 1906 was extant in manuscript in the Library of the Vatican. However, according to modern scholar Israel Netanel Rubin, Vidal did not actually write To'elet ha-Higgayon and it was falsely attributed to him due to a similarity in the name of the translator. Additionally, the philosophy in the work seems to be counter what historians think Vidal would believe based on his work Maggid Mishneh.
