= Manoaḥ of Narbonne =

Rabbeinu Manoach ben Yaakov, one of the sages of Provence, lived and was active at the end of the 13th century, and authored a commentary on the Mishneh Torah of the Rambam.

== Biography ==
Rabbeinu Manoach lived during his lifetime in Narbonne and Lunel. His teachers were his father, Rabbi Shimon, Rabbi Meir son of Rabbi Shimon HaMe’ili, and Rabbi Reuven son of Rabbi Chaim. According to the Chida, his teacher was Rabbi Meir ben Baruch. He authored the book HaMenuchah—a commentary on the words of the Rambam in Mishneh Torah—and we possess his commentaries on sections from the Books of Ahavah and Zemanim. In his work, Rabbeinu Manoach mainly strives to present the Rambam’s sources and to resolve the objections of the Raavad. He relates to the Rambam with very great respect. Rabbi David Conforti, in his book Kore HaDorot, suggests that the Tosafot in Tractate Chullin 24a (s.v. ta‘ama), who quote from Rabbeinu Manoach, were referring to him. Rabbi Yosef Karo frequently cites his words and discusses them in his works Kesef Mishneh and Beit Yosef.

His novellae were first printed in Constantinople in the year 1718, on part of the Book of Zemanim in the Mishneh Torah. These novellae were reprinted in 1879 in Pressburg, and alongside them was appended an extensive and comprehensive commentary by Rabbi Shimon Sidan, entitled Beit Menuchah. In 1970, the Mossad HaRav Kook publishing house released from manuscript Rabbeinu Manoach’s commentaries on part of the Book of Ahavah in the Mishneh Torah. In the edition of the Mishneh Torah published by Shabse Frankel, his commentaries were added to additional sections of the Rambam. It is unclear whether Rabbeinu Manoach composed his commentary on the entirety of the Mishneh Torah, and most of it was lost, or whether he authored it only on part of it.
