= Haggahot Maimuniyyot =

13th century Jewish religious text

- Author: Meir HaKohen
- Original title: הגהות מיימוניות
- Language: Hebrew
- Publication date: ca. 1509

Haggahot Maimuniyyot (Hebrew: הגהות מיימוניות) is a 13th-century halakhic work authored by Meir HaKohen. It is one of the most important sources for the halakhic rulings of the scholars of Germany and France, and it is one of the defining halakhic works of the Ashkenazi tosafists. The work consists of supplemental notes (haggahot) to the Mishneh Torah of Maimonides, with the objective of imparting contemporary Sephardic thought to Jews in Germany and France, while juxtaposing it to contemporary Ashkenazi halakhic customs.

== Publication ==
The work may originally have been written on the margins of the Mishneh Torah, as it appears in early manuscripts. The first publication was in the 1509 Constantinople edition of the Mishneh Torah. The work was later published again in 1524 in Venice. There are differences between the editions of 1509 and 1524, some of which are material. The wording of the glosses in the Venice edition (from which the later editions were printed) is more original and the author generally speaks in the first person, while the wording of the 1509 edition shows signs of being a later version. Additionally certain passages appear in the Constantinople version which are absent from the Venice version, and vice versa. The Constantinople edition contains additions that may have been added by the editor.

== Contents ==
The work is divided into two sections, the first consisting of notes attached to the Mishneh Torah itself. The second, called "Teshovot Maimuniyyot", is appended at the end of each book and contains responsa by German and French scholars relevant to the topics in the body of the work. Eight out of the fourteen books of the Mishneh Torah contain supplemental notes. The books which are not included in the work are: "Hafla'ah", "Zemanim", "Avodah", "Korbanot", and "Taharah". The work as a whole constitutes an important source for Medieval Ashkenazi rabbinic literature, containing a number of attributed formulations that appear nowhere else.
