= Meir Simcha of Dvinsk =

Lithuanian rabbi

Rabbi Meir Simcha of Dvinsk
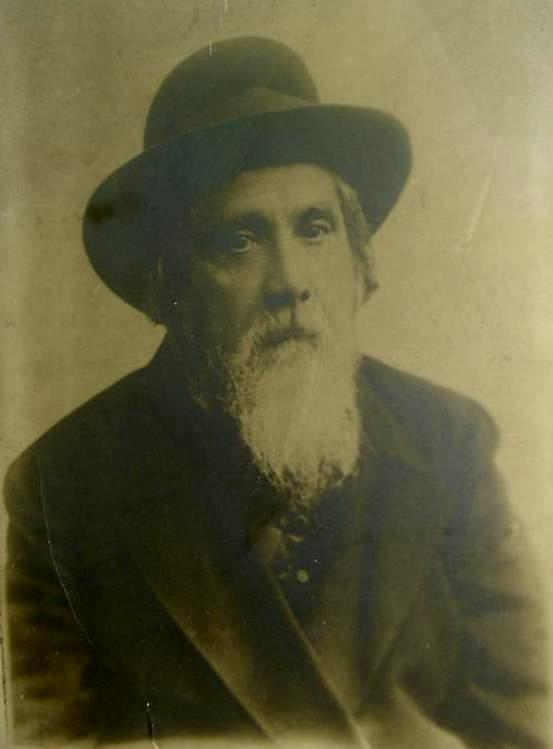

Personal life
- Born: 1843 Butrimonys, Vilna Governorate, Russian Empire (now Lithuania)
- Died: 14 August 1926 (aged 82–83) Riga, Latvia
- Parent: Samson Kalonymus (father)
- Occupation: Rabbi in Dvinsk

Religious life
- Religion: Judaism
- Main work: Ohr Somayach; Meshech Chochma
- Yahrtzeit: 4 Elul 5686

Meir Simcha of Dvinsk (also known as Meir Simcha Ha-Kohen, 1843 – 14 August 1926) was an Orthodox rabbi in the Russian Empire and Latvia. A leader of the Jewish community in Daugavpils, he is known for his writings on Maimonides' Mishneh Torah, which he titled Ohr Somayach, as well as his novellae on the Torah, titled Meshech Chochma.

== Early life ==
Meir Simcha was born in Butrimonys (Yiddish: Baltrimantz), Vilna Governorate, in the Russian Empire (now Lithuania) to Samson Kalonymus, a local wealthy merchant. According to family tradition, his later success in Torah study was attributed to two blessings his parents had received from local rabbis before his birth. He received his education locally, and managed to evade the regular roundups of Jewish boys that were being held as a result of the Cantonist decrees that had been in effect since 1827. After marrying in 1860, at age 17, he settled in Białystok, Grodno Governorate (now Poland), where his wife opened a business to support him while he continued his Talmudic studies.

== Career ==
After turning down many rabbinical positions that were offered him during his 27 years in Białystok, Meir Simcha finally relented and accepted the rabbinate of the mitnagdim (non-Hasidic Jews) in the town of Dvinsk, Vitebsk Governorate (now Daugavpils, Latvia). He served in that position for 39 years until his death. His counterpart there was Yosef Rosen, a Hasidic rabbi known as the Rogatchover Gaon—or by his work, Tzofnath Paneach. The two had great respect for one another—despite Rosen's fiery temper—and on occasion referred questions in Jewish law to each other. They also shared a love for the works of Maimonides.

In 1906, a certain Shlomo Friedlander claimed to have discovered and then published two tractates of the Jerusalem Talmud that had been considered to have been lost for hundreds of years. Meir Simcha was one of a group of prominent rabbis (Note: Including the Rogatchover Gaon, the Gerer Rebbe, Moshe Shmuel Glasner of Klausenburg, the Dor Revi'i, and Yissachar Dov Ritter of Rotterdam.) who discovered that the work was a very clever forgery, and denounced it as such.

In Dvinsk, he received supplicants from the entire region, and was frequently consulted on issues affecting the community at large, including Poland and Lithuania. He reportedly turned down offers for the rabbinate in various large cities, including Jerusalem, New York City and Kovno.

== Opinions ==
Meir Simcha opposed the non-religious Zionist groups, but expressed his approval of Religious Zionism. After the Balfour Declaration, he was of the opinion that the Three Oaths were no longer in effect. He was present at the founding meetings of Agudath Yisrael in the German town of Bad Homburg, but could not attend the first large conference in Katowice due to poor health. He had several clashes with some of his contemporaries, including Yisrael Meir Kagan (the Chafetz Chaim) on political issues and questions of Jewish law.

It is harder to determine his exact stance in philosophical matters, although much can be gleaned from his Meshech Chochma. (Note: lit. 'The Price of Wisdom'; MeSheKh is an acronym for Meir Simcha Kohen—the phrase is derived from Job 28:18.) His main contribution to Jewish philosophy was to be posthumous. His student Menachem Mendel Zaks published Meshech Chochma, which contains novellae on the Torah, but very often branches off into questions of Jewish philosophy. Meir Simcha is often quoted as having predicted the Holocaust in a statement in this work: "They think that Berlin is Jerusalem ... from there will come the storm winds that will uproot them".

== Personal life and death ==
Meir Simcha had one daughter with mental issues who predeceased him. He mentions a son-in-law, Avraham (Luftvir), in his book Meshech Chochma. The couple died young and are buried in Warsaw. Meir Simcha died in a hotel in Riga while seeking medical treatment. He left no living descendants. As a result of this, one of his most prominent students and close friend Yisrael Avraham Abba Krieger committed himself to carrying on his legacy.

== Works ==
Meir Simcha authored Ohr Somayach (or Ohr Sameiach; lit. 'joyful light'), (Note: A play on his name, possibly derived from Proverbs 13:9.) a collection of novellae on Maimonides' Mishneh Torah. His approach is highly original, gathering material from the breadth of Jewish religious literature to approach difficult contradictions in Maimonides' main work of Jewish law. It was published during his lifetime and immediately became popular. Other works, novellae on the Talmud and responsa, did not have the same impact but are still used for reference.

- Ohr Somayach on Maimonides' Mishneh Torah.
- Ohr Somayach on Talmudic tractates Bava Kamma and Bava Metzia.
- Ohr Somayach novellae on the Talmud.
- Ohr Somayach responsa addressing many practical issues of halacha.
- Meshech Chochma on Chumash.
- Various treatises on parts of the Jerusalem Talmud.
- Comments and insights on the Sefer ha-Chinuch.

== Ohr Somayach yeshivas ==
In the late 1970s, several baal teshuva yeshivas under Haredi auspices were founded and chose to honor the memory of Meir Simcha of Dvinsk by naming their institutions after his pen name "Ohr Somayach". The first of these was the yeshiva Ohr Somayach, Jerusalem in Israel, and another was Ohr Somayach, Monsey in the United States. Other branches were established in Toronto and Montreal in Canada, and in Detroit, Los Angeles, and Philadelphia. Other branches worldwide bearing the name Ohr Somayach are Ohr Somayach, South Africa, and those in London in the United Kingdom, Kiev in Ukraine, and Sydney in Australia.
