= Ohr Somayach (book) =

Commentary on the Mishneh Torah

Ohr Somayach is a commentary on Mishneh Torah, authored by Rabbi Meir Simcha of Dvinsk.

== Overview ==
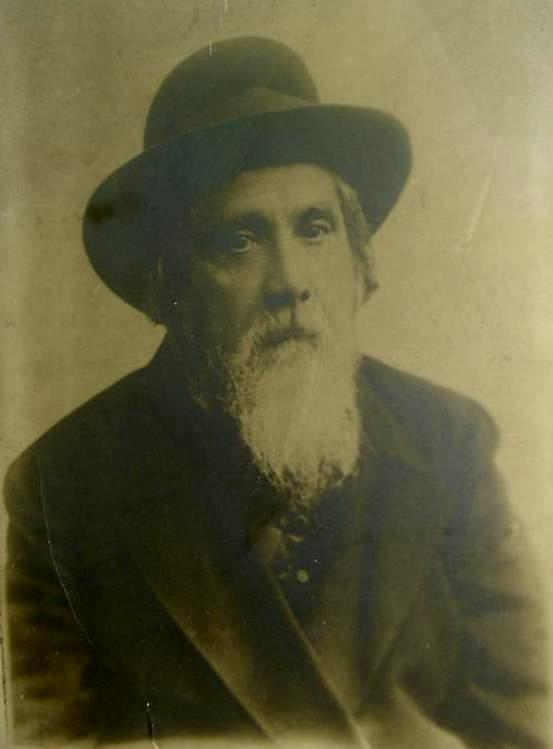
Rabbi Meir Simcha of Dvinsk

The book, published in 1925, a year before its author's death, presents original understandings on Maimonides' Mishneh Torah. The work became popular and is studied by young yeshiva students and accomplished Torah scholars alike.

The author, Rabbi Meir Simcha of Dvinsk, is often known as the Ohr Samayach, after the commentary he wrote.

== See also ==
- List of commentaries on Mishneh Torah
- Maimonides
- Ohr Somayach, Monsey
- Ohr Somayach, Jerusalem
