= Herman Hedwig Bernard =

English Hebraist

Herman Hedwig Bernard (1785–1857) was an English Hebraist (a specialist in Jewish, Hebrew and Hebraic studies), for many years a Hebrew teacher in the University of Cambridge. He died on 15 November 1857, aged 72.

An apostate from Judaism, Bernard was born Hirsch Ber Hurwitz and hailed from Uman, Ukraine. He is purported to have played chess with and read German stories before Rabbi Nachman of Breslov. In his "Biographical Notices of Some of the Most Distinguished Jewish Rabbies (sic) and Translations of Portions of Their Commentaries, and Other Works" (New York: Stanford and Swords, 1847), Samuel H. Turner, professor of Biblical Learning and Interpretation of Scripture at the General Theological Seminary, commends the pedagogic quality of Bernard's work, writing: "The student will find this work very useful in facilitating the acquisition of Rabbinical Hebrew".

== Other works ==
He was the author of:

- The main principles of the Creed and Ethics of the Jews exhibited in selections from the Yad Hachazakah of Maimonides, with a literal English translation, copious illustrations from the Talmud, &c., and a collection of the abbreviations commonly used in Rabbinical writings, Cambridge, 1832, 8vo,
- The Guide of the Hebrew Student, containing an Epitome of Sacred History, London, 1839, 8vo, Cambridge Free Thoughts and Letters on Bibliolatry, translated from the German of Lessing, Cambridge, 1862, 8vo, edited by J. Bernard, and
- The Book of Job, as expounded to his Cambridge pupils, edited, with a translation and additional notes, by F. Chance, London, 1864, 1884, 8vo.
