= Meir HaKohen =

13th century German rabbi

Meir HaKohen was a German rabbinical scholar of the end of the thirteenth century. He authored Hagahot Maimuniot (or Haggahot Maimuniyyot) (הגהות מיימוניות, abbreviated הגהמי״י) on Maimonides' Mishneh Torah. Giulio Bartolocci mistakenly identifies him with Meïr Ha-Kohen, a French scholar of the same century. Meir HaKohen flourished at Rothenburg ob der Tauber, a Free Imperial City of the Holy Roman Empire, in the late 13th century. He was a student of Meir of Rothenburg.

== Works ==
Hagahot Maimuniot, authored by Meir HaCohen, is one of the most important sources for the halachic rulings of medieval Ashkenazi rabbis. It takes the form of a running commentary on the Mishneh Torah by Maimonides, and nowadays commonly appears at the bottom of the page in many printed editions of Mishneh Torah. There is also a section entitled Teshuvot Maimuniot which appears at the end of each book of Mishneh Torah.
