= Judah Rosanes =

Judah ben Samuel Rosanes (1657–1727) was Rabbi of Constantinople and son-in-law of Abraham Rosanes I. His teachers in Talmud and rabbinics were Samuel HaLevi and Joseph di Trani the Younger. On account of his knowledge of Arabic and Turkish he was appointed by the government as chief rabbi ("hakam bashi") of the Ottoman Empire. He died at an advanced age in Constantinople on April 13, 1727.

Judah took a very active part in condemning and denouncing the Shabbethaians, and he was one of the signers of an appeal to the German communities to oppose the movement. He wrote:

- Parashat Derakim (Constantinople, 1727), a work containing twenty-six homiletic treatises on various subjects.
- A pamphlet entitled Derekh Miẓvotekha, a treatise on the 613 commandments, based on the treatises on the same subject by Maimonides and others.
- Mishneh la-Melek (ib. 1731), glosses and comments on Maimonides' Mishneh Torah; later it was printed together with the Mishneh Torah.

This work and others were edited and published by his devoted pupil Rabbi Yaakov Culi.

Several works bear approbations ("haskamot") by Judah Rosanes, among others Joseph Almosnino's Edut bi-Yehosef.
