= Jacob J. Rabinowitz =

Professor of law

- יעקב רבינוביץ
- Occupation: Associate Professor of Law at Hebrew University of Jerusalem

Jacob J. Rabinowitz (Hebrew: יעקב רבינוביץ; 1899–1960) was a professor of law, notable for his English translation of one of the Mishneh Torah books.

== Early life ==
Rabinowitz graduated from a secondary school in Kiev. In 1924 he emigrated with his family to the United States. His father, Rabbi Moshe Zvi Rabinowitz, was a rabbinical leader in Brooklyn, New York.

In 1930 he received a M. A. from Columbia University, and in 1937 his doctor's degree from the New York Law School, later working under Commissioner of Investigation of New York City William Herlands. In the period 1942 — 1949 Rabinowitz was on the legal staff of the Department of Investigation of the City of New York

He was also a lecturer at the Jewish Theological Seminary of America, publishing articles and books on Hebraic law and its relation to modern-day judicial systems. His translation of the book of Kinyan in the Mishneh Torah was published by Yale University Press.

== Career ==
Rabinowitz emigrated to Israel, becoming the first member of the law faculty in the Hebrew University of Jerusalem to teach Hebrew law. His publications, both in English and Hebrew, researched the Torah and Talmud.

== Publications ==
- The Common Law Mortgage and the Conditional Bound, University of Pennsylvania Law Review, vol. 92 (1943).
- The Origin of the Common Law Warranty of Real Property and of the Inchoate Right of Dwoer, Cornell Law Quarterly, vol. 20 (1944).
- The Story of the Mortgage Retold, University of Pennsylvania Law Review, vol. 94 (1945).
- The Title De Migrantibus of the Lex Salica and the Jewish Herem Hayishub, Speculum, vol. 22 (1947).
- The Influence of Jewish Law upon the Development of Frankish Law, Proceedings of the American Academy for Jewish Research, vol. 16 (1947).
- The Influence of Jewish Law on the Development of the Common Law, The Jews: Their History, Culture and Religion, ed. Louis Finkelstein (New York, 1949).
- The Book of Civil Laws, translated from the Code of Maimonides, Yale University Press, 1949, xxiv, 345 pp.
- Jewish and Lombard Laws, Jewish Social Studies, vol. 12 (1950).
- The Origin of Representation by Attorney in English Law, Law Quarterly Review, vol. 68 (1952).
- Marriage Contracts in Ancient Egypt in the Light of Jewish Sources Harvard Theological Review, vol. 46 (1953).
- The Legal Document from Murabba'at, Biblica, 35 (1954).
- A Note on Isa. 46:4, Journal of Biblical Literature, 73 (1954).
- Note sur la lettre de Bar Kokhba, Revue Biblique, 61 (1954).
- Some Notes on an Aramaic Contract from the Dead Sea Region, BASOR 136 (December 1954).
- A Legal Formula in the Susa Tablets, in an Egyptian Document of the Twelfth Dynasty, in the Aramaic Papyri, and in the Book of Daniel, Biblica, vol. 36 (1955).
- The Meaning of 'Mahar Yom Ahran' in the Aramaic Papyri, Journal of Near Eastern Studies, 14 (1955).
- A Clue to the Babatean Contract from the Dead Sea Region, BASOR, 139 (October 1955).
