= Pilpul =

Method of studying the Talmud through intense textual analysis

Pilpul (Hebrew: פלפול, loosely meaning 'sharp analysis'; from פִּלְפֵּל (pilpel) 'pepper') is a method of studying the Talmud through intense textual analysis in attempts to either explain conceptual differences between various halakhic rulings or to reconcile any apparent contradictions presented from various readings of different texts. The word pilpul has entered English as a colloquialism used by some to indicate extreme disputation or casuistic hairsplitting.

== Sources ==
The requirement for close derivation of the conceptual structures underlying various Jewish laws, as a regular part of one's Torah study, is described by Maimonides as follows:

A person is obligated to divide his study time in three: one third should be devoted to the Written Law; one third to the Oral Law; and one third to understanding and conceptualizing the ultimate derivation of a concept from its roots, inferring one concept from another and comparing concepts, understanding [the Torah] based on the principles of Torah exegesis, until one appreciates the essence of those principles and how the prohibitions and the other decisions which one received according to the oral tradition can be derived using them....

Other such sources include Pirkei Avot, the Babylonian Talmud, Rashi, and Shneur Zalman of Liadi.

== Narrow definition ==
In the narrower sense, pilpul refers to a method of conceptual extrapolation from texts in efforts to reconcile various texts or to explain fundamental differences of approach between various earlier authorities, which became popular in the late fifteenth and early sixteenth centuries: its founders are generally considered to be Jacob Pollak and Shalom Shachna. Pilpul was defined by Heinrich Graetz as "the astonishing facility of ingenious disquisition on the basis of the Talmud."

=== Opposition ===
Many leading rabbinic authorities have harshly criticized this method as being unreliable and a waste of time, and it is regarded by some as having been discredited by the time of the Vilna Gaon. A common criticism is that those who used this method were often motivated by the prospect of impressing others with the sophistication of their analysis, rather than by a disinterested pursuit of truth; such students, it was held, did not apply appropriate standards of proof in obtaining their conclusions (if any), and frequently presupposed conclusions that necessitated unlikely readings (interpretations) of "proof-texts". As such, pilpul has been derogatorily called bilbul, Hebrew for "confusion".

Judah Loew ben Bezalel (the Maharal), in a famous polemic against pilpul, wrote:

It would be better to learn carpentry or another trade, or to sharpen the mind by playing chess. At least they would not engage in falsehood, which then spills over from theory and into practice..."

The Rebbe Sholom Dovber Schneersohn, quoting Maharal, allows for "genuine pilpul" while dismissing "false pilpul":

Genuine pilpul is possible only when first one knows the simple meaning of the Halachah guilelessly, in a structured manner, using straightforward terms... Afterwards, if G‑d has graciously endowed a person with a capable intellectual potential and broad-minded thought processes, he may delve into a pilpul.... If, however, a student will begin with pilpul before he has a genuine appreciation of the subject in the above manner, as a natural consequence, the pilpul will be false, and he will waste his time with ersatz thoughts.

An approach contrasting to pilpul, often referred to as "aliba dehilchasa" ("analyzing the sugya re. the Halacha"), emphasizes (legal) application over abstraction.

== Current methods ==
In the late eighteenth and nineteenth centuries, pilpul in this narrow sense was largely superseded by the analytic methods pioneered by the Lithuanian school, in particular the Brisker derech. However, many people consider these methods too to be a form of pilpul, although the practitioners of the analytic method generally reject the term. Before World War II, both the old and the new kinds of pilpul were popular among Lithuanian and Polish Jews. Since then, they have become prominent in most Ashkenazi and many Chassidic yeshivas.

== See also ==
- Aaron ben Meir of Brest
- Brisker method
- Eisegesis
