= Chaim Soloveitchik =

Belarusian rabbi

Chaim Soloveitchik חיים סאָלאָווייטשיק
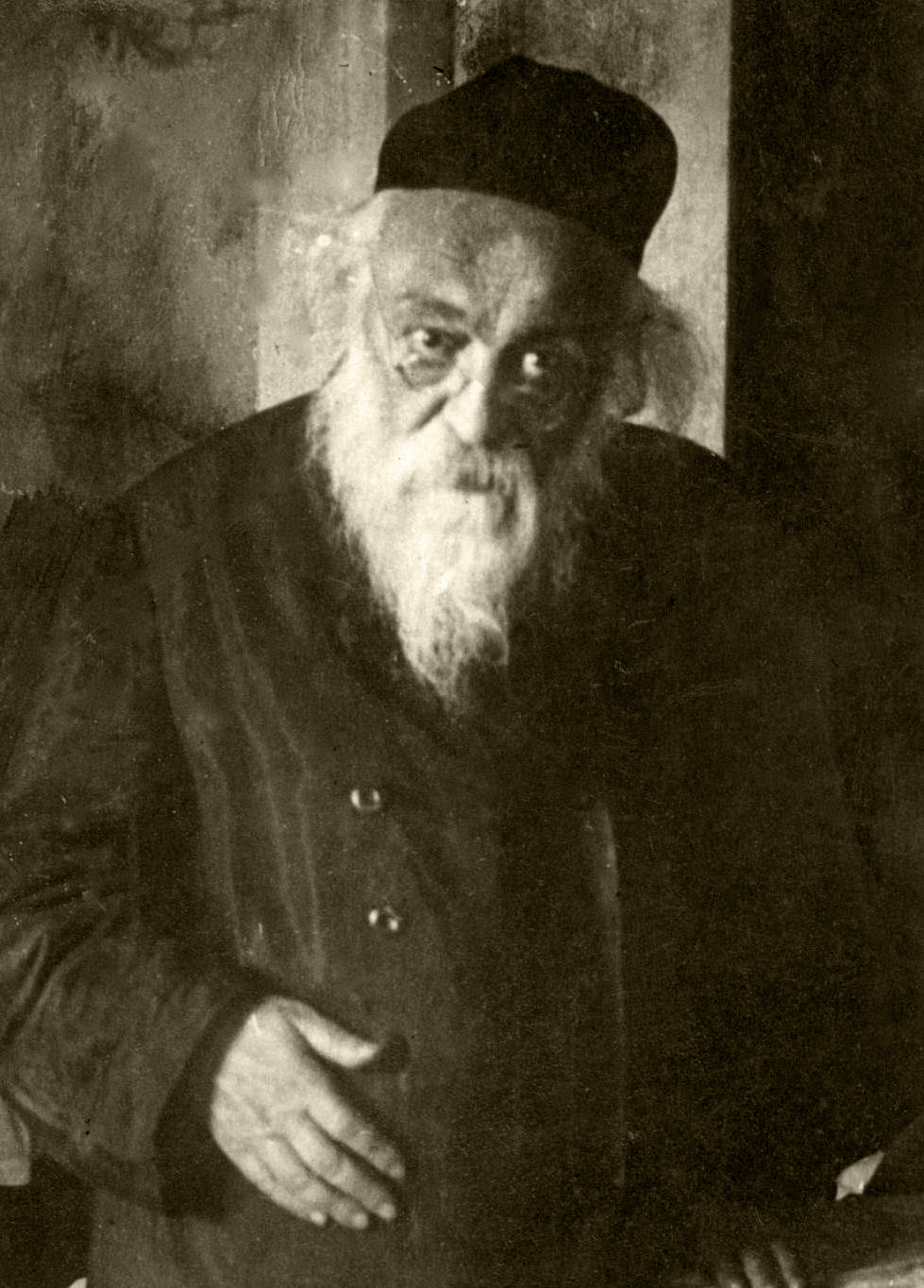
- Title: Rabbi

Personal life
- Born: March 25, 1853 Volozhin, Russian Empire
- Died: July 30, 1918 (aged 65) Otwock, Kingdom of Poland
- Buried: Jewish Cemetery, Warsaw
- Children: Moshe Soloveichik, Yitzchok Zev Soloveitchik, Yisroel Gershon Soloveichik
- Parents: Yosef Dov Soloveitchik (father); Lifsha Shapiro (mother)
- Dynasty: Soloveitchik dynasty

Religious life
- Religion: Judaism
- Denomination: Orthodox Judaism

Jewish leader
- Yahrtzeit: 21 Av 5678
- Dynasty: Soloveitchik dynasty

Chaim (Halevi) Soloveitchik (Yiddish: חיים סאָלאָווייטשיק, Polish: Chaim Sołowiejczyk), also known as Chaim Brisker (1853 – 30 July 1918), was a rabbi and Talmudic scholar credited as the founder of the Brisker method of Talmudic study within Judaism. He was also a member of the Soloveitchik dynasty, the son of Yosef Dov Soloveitchik.

He is also known as the Gra"ch (Hebrew: גר״ח), an abbreviation of "HaGaon Reb Chaim."

== Biography ==
Soloveitchik was born in Volozhin on March 25, 1853, where his father, Rabbi Yosef Dov Soloveitchik was a lecturer in the Volozhiner Yeshiva. The family moved away from Volozhin, and after a few years his father was appointed as a rabbi in Slutsk, where Chaim was first educated.

He joined the faculty of the Volozhiner Yeshiva in 1880, and later became assistant rosh yeshiva for a short time, until the Russian Empire forced the yeshiva to close, when he moved to Brisk, Belarus and succeeded his father as the rabbi there.

He died on July 30, 1918 after seeking medical treatment in Warsaw and was buried in the Jewish Cemetery there.

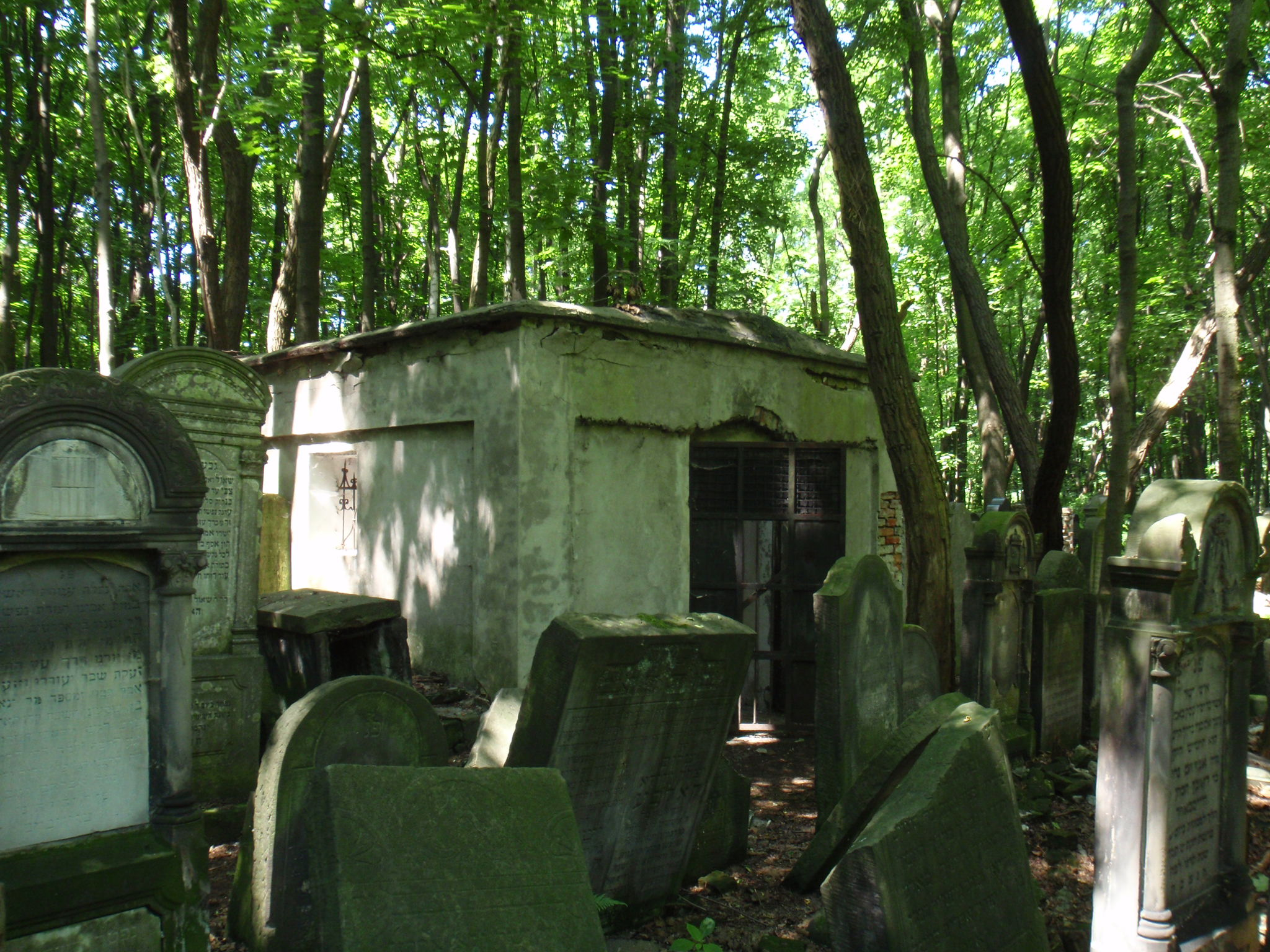
Tomb of Naftali Zvi Yehuda Berlin and Soloveitchik in Warsaw

== Works ==
He is considered the founder of the "Brisker method" (in Yiddish: Brisker derech; Hebrew: derekh brisk), a method of highly exacting and analytical Talmudical study that focuses on precise definition/s and categorization/s of Jewish law as commanded in the Torah. His works would have particular emphasis on the legal writings of Maimonides.

Soloveitchik's primary work was Chiddushei Rabbeinu Chaim, a volume of insights on Maimonides' Mishneh Torah which often would suggest novel understandings of the Talmud as well. Based on his teachings and lectures, his students wrote down his insights on the Talmud known as Chiddushi HaGRaCh Al Shas. This book is known as "Reb Chaim's stencils" and contains analytical insights into Talmudic topics.

== Views ==
Soloveitchik worked with Sholom Dovber Schneersohn, the fifth rebbe of the hasidic dynasty of Lubavitch, in counteracting antisemitic decrees by the czarist regime. He expanded the definition of who represented Amalek, claiming that all who sought to destroy the Jewish people were ideological descendants of the Jewish enemy.

Soloveitchik was an opponent of Zionism and viewed it as a movement to destroy traditional Judaism and replace it with nationalism.

== Family ==
A member of the Soloveitchik-family rabbinical dynasty, he is commonly known as Reb Chaim Brisker ("Rabbi Chaim [from] Brisk").

He married the daughter of Refael Shapiro, who was also the granddaughter of Berlin. Reb Chaim had four children, R. Yisrael Gershon, R. Moshe, Sara (Glickson), and R. Yitchak Zev (also known as Rabbi Velvel Soloveitchik). R. Moshe moved to the United States and subsequently served as a rosh yeshiva of Yeshiva Yitzchak Elchonon (YU/RIETS) in New York and who was in turn succeeded by his sons Joseph B. Soloveitchik (1903–1993) and Ahron Soloveichik (1917–2001). R. Yitzchak Zev moved to Israel and his sons led prominent yeshivas.

Brisker family tree

Rabbanit Esti Rosenberg, director of Migdal Oz (seminary)
Rabbi Yitzchok Lichtenstein, Co-Rosh Yeshiva of Yeshiva Torah Vodaas; Rabbi Bais Avrohom, Monsey, NY
Rabbi Yosef Dov (Reb Berel) Soloveichik	Rabbi Avrohom Yehoshua Soloveichik	Rabbi Mosheh Lichtenstein, Co-Rosh Yeshiva of Yeshivat Har Etzion
Rabbi Meshulam Dovid (Reb Dovid) Soloveichik	Rabbi Yitzchak Zev Soloveichik	Rabbi Mayer Lichtenstein, Rabbi Ohel Menachem Bet Shemesh
Rabbi Yosef Dov (HaLevi) Soloveichik author of Beis HaLevi	Rabbi Chaim Soloveichik "Reb Chaim Brisker"	Rabbi Yitzchak Zev (Reb Velvel) Soloveichik "The GRIZ"; The Brisker Rov	Lifsha Soloveitchik Feinstein	Dr. Tovah Soloveitchik Lichtenstein	Rabbi Jonathan Rosenblatt
Rabbi Refael Shapiro, Rosh Yeshiva of Volozhin yeshiva	Lifsha Shapiro	Rabbi Refoel Soloveichik	Rabbi Dr. Aharon Lichtenstein	Tzipporah Rosenblatt
Rabbi Meir Soloveichik	Dr. Atarah Soloveitchik Twersky	Rabbi Mosheh Twersky z"l, Maggid Shiur at Yeshiva Toras Moshe
Rabbi Dr. Joseph B. (Yosef Dov) Soloveitchik "The Rav"	Rabbi Dr. Isadore Twersky, Talner Rebbe of Boston	Rabbi Mayer Twersky, Rosh Yeshiva at Rabbi Isaac Elchanan Theological Seminary
Rabbi Moshe Soloveichik	Rabbi Ahron Soloveichik	Rabbi Dr. Haym Soloveitchik	Rabbi Moshe Soloveichik, Rosh Yeshivas Brisk (Chicago); Rav of Kehilas Beth Sholom Ahavas Achim
Peshka Feinstein Soloveichik	Dr. Samuel Soloveichik	Rabbi Eliyahu Soloveichik, Rosh Yeshiva at Lander College's Beis Medrash L'Talmud	Rabbi Meir Yaakov Soloveichik
Shulamit Soloveitchik Meiselman	Rabbi Moshe Meiselman, Rosh Yeshiva of Yeshiva Toras Moshe	Rabbi Yosef Soloveichik	Sarah Orenshein
Anne Soloveitchik Gerber	Rabbi Chayim Soloveichik, Maggid Shiur at Yeshivat Reishit; Morah D’Asrah of Kehillat Ohr Shalom, Ramat Beit Shemesh	Moshe Soloveichik
Rabbi Yosef Dov Soloveichik	Rabbi Shmuel Chaim Soloveichik
Rabbi Yitzchok Soloveichik	Rabbi Yisroel Soloveichik
Rabbi Yisroel Gershon Soloveichik	Rabbi Moshe Soloveichik	Rabbi Boruch Soloveichik
Rabbi Avraham Yeshaya Soloveichik
Daughter Soloveichik

Notes:
- Rabbi Chaim Halevi Soloveichik (the second)
