= Yitzchok Zev Soloveitchik =

Belarusian-Israeli Orthodox rabbi

Rabbi Yitzchok Zev Soloveitchik
- יצחק זאב סולובייצ'יק
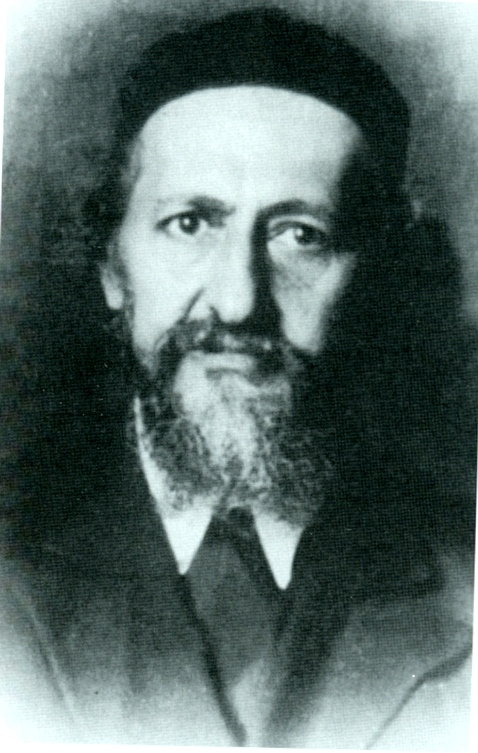
- Title: The Brisker Rav

Personal life
- Born: Yitzchok Zev Soloveitchik; 19 October 1886 Wołożyn, Vistula Land
- Died: 11 October 1959 (aged 72) Jerusalem
- Buried: Har HaMenuchos, Jerusalem
- Spouse: Alte Hendl Auerbach
- Children: Freidel (1913–1919); Berel (Yosef Dov); Lifsha (married Rabbi Yechiel Michel Feinstein); Chaim; Meshulam Dovid Soloveitchik; Boruch Refoel Yehoshua Soloveitchik; Gittel Sara Rascha (1926–1942); Meir; Feige Tzirel (1931–1932); Rivka (married Rabbi Yaakov Schiff); Naftali Tzvi Yehudah Leib; Shmuel Yaakov
- Parent(s): Rabbi Chaim Soloveitchik and Lifsha Shapira
- Occupation: Rabbi

Religious life
- Religion: Judaism
- Denomination: Orthodox Judaism

Yitzchok Zev Halevi Soloveitchik (Hebrew: יצחק זאב הלוי סולובייצ'יק), also known as Velvel Soloveitchik ("Zev" means "wolf" in Hebrew, and "Velvel" is the diminutive of "wolf" in Yiddish) or the Brisker Rov ("rabbi of/from Brisk", (19 October 1886 – 11 October 1959), was an Orthodox rabbi and rosh yeshiva of the Brisk yeshiva in Jerusalem.

A scion of the Soloveitchik rabbinical dynasty, he is commonly referred to as the "GRY"Z" (an acronym for Gaon Rabbi Yitzchok Zev) and "The Rov". He was known for his stringency in halakha (Jewish law) and advocacy for non-participation in the Israeli political system.

== Biography ==
Yitzchok Zev Soloveitchik was born to Chaim Soloveitchik in Valozhyn. On his mother's side, he was the grandson of Refael Shapiro, a rosh yeshiva in the Volozhin yeshiva.

Soloveitchik moved with his family to the Jewish community of Brisk after the czarist government closed the Volozhin yeshiva. He would succeed his father as a rabbi of Brisk and leader of Judaic studies in his region.

After fleeing the Holocaust and moving to Mandatory Palestine, he re-established the Brisk yeshiva in Jerusalem.

After Soloveitchik's death in 1959, his son Berel took over his father's position as rosh yeshiva of Yeshivas Brisk. Another of his sons was Meshulam Dovid Soloveitchik.

Soloveitchik did not recite from memory when speaking, he read all his sources from their original works.

== Brisker rabbinic dynasty ==
Brisker family tree

Rabbanit Esti Rosenberg, director of Migdal Oz (seminary)
Rabbi Yitzchok Lichtenstein, Co-Rosh Yeshiva of Yeshiva Torah Vodaas; Rabbi Bais Avrohom, Monsey, NY
Rabbi Yosef Dov (Reb Berel) Soloveichik	Rabbi Avrohom Yehoshua Soloveichik	Rabbi Mosheh Lichtenstein, Co-Rosh Yeshiva of Yeshivat Har Etzion
Rabbi Meshulam Dovid (Reb Dovid) Soloveichik	Rabbi Yitzchak Zev Soloveichik	Rabbi Mayer Lichtenstein, Rabbi Ohel Menachem Bet Shemesh
Rabbi Yosef Dov (HaLevi) Soloveichik author of Beis HaLevi	Rabbi Chaim Soloveichik "Reb Chaim Brisker"	Rabbi Yitzchak Zev (Reb Velvel) Soloveichik "The GRIZ"; The Brisker Rov	Lifsha Soloveitchik Feinstein	Dr. Tovah Soloveitchik Lichtenstein	Rabbi Jonathan Rosenblatt
Rabbi Refael Shapiro, Rosh Yeshiva of Volozhin yeshiva	Lifsha Shapiro	Rabbi Refoel Soloveichik	Rabbi Dr. Aharon Lichtenstein	Tzipporah Rosenblatt
Rabbi Meir Soloveichik	Dr. Atarah Soloveitchik Twersky	Rabbi Mosheh Twersky z"l, Maggid Shiur at Yeshiva Toras Moshe
Rabbi Dr. Joseph B. (Yosef Dov) Soloveitchik "The Rav"	Rabbi Dr. Isadore Twersky, Talner Rebbe of Boston	Rabbi Mayer Twersky, Rosh Yeshiva at Rabbi Isaac Elchanan Theological Seminary
Rabbi Moshe Soloveichik	Rabbi Ahron Soloveichik	Rabbi Dr. Haym Soloveitchik	Rabbi Moshe Soloveichik, Rosh Yeshivas Brisk (Chicago); Rav of Kehilas Beth Sholom Ahavas Achim
Peshka Feinstein Soloveichik	Dr. Samuel Soloveichik	Rabbi Eliyahu Soloveichik, Rosh Yeshiva at Lander College's Beis Medrash L'Talmud	Rabbi Meir Yaakov Soloveichik
Shulamit Soloveitchik Meiselman	Rabbi Moshe Meiselman, Rosh Yeshiva of Yeshiva Toras Moshe	Rabbi Yosef Soloveichik	Sarah Orenshein
Anne Soloveitchik Gerber	Rabbi Chayim Soloveichik, Maggid Shiur at Yeshivat Reishit; Morah D’Asrah of Kehillat Ohr Shalom, Ramat Beit Shemesh	Moshe Soloveichik
Rabbi Yosef Dov Soloveichik	Rabbi Shmuel Chaim Soloveichik
Rabbi Yitzchok Soloveichik	Rabbi Yisroel Soloveichik
Rabbi Yisroel Gershon Soloveichik	Rabbi Moshe Soloveichik	Rabbi Boruch Soloveichik
Rabbi Avraham Yeshaya Soloveichik
Daughter Soloveichik

Notes:
- Rabbi Chaim Halevi Soloveichik (the second)

== See also ==
- Yehoshua Leib Diskin, another Jewish leader known as the "rabbi from Brisk"
- Naftali Rothenberg, Yair Halevi, ‘’’The Rabbi of Brisk: Rabbi Yitzchok Zev Soloveitchik’’’, in: Benjamin Brown, Nissim Leon, eds. The Gdoilim – Leaders Who Shaped the Israeli Haredi Jewry, Magnes Hebrew University Press, 2017, (Hebrew)
