= Mishneh Torah =

Code of Jewish religious law authored by Maimonides

- מִשְׁנֵה תוֹרָה
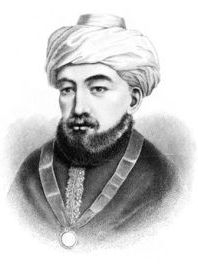
- Maimonides (artist's conceptual drawing)

Information
- Religion: Judaism
- Author: Maimonides
- Language: Hebrew
- Period: 1170–1180 CE
- Chapters: Fourteen books, 1,000 chapters
- Mishneh Torah at Hebrew Wikisource

The Mishneh Torah (Hebrew: מִשְׁנֵה תוֹרָה, lit. 'repetition of the Torah'), also known as Sefer Yad ha-Hazaka (ספר יד החזקה, 'book of the strong hand'), is a code of Rabbinic Jewish religious law (halakha) authored by Maimonides (Rabbi Moshe ben Maimon/Rambam). The Mishneh Torah was compiled between 1170 and 1180 CE (4930 and 4940 AM), while Maimonides was living in Egypt, and is regarded as Maimonides' magnum opus. Accordingly, later sources simply refer to the work as "Maimon", "Maimonides", or "RaMBaM", although Maimonides composed other works.

Mishneh Torah consists of fourteen books, subdivided into sections, chapters, and paragraphs. It is the only medieval-era work that details all of Jewish observance, including those laws that are only applicable when the Temple in Jerusalem is in existence, and remains an important work in Judaism.

Its title is an appellation originally used for the Biblical book of Deuteronomy, and its moniker, "Book of the Strong Hand", derives from its subdivision into fourteen books: the numerical value fourteen, when represented as the Hebrew letters Yodh (10) and Dalet (4), forms the word yad ('hand').

Maimonides intended to provide a complete statement of the Oral Law, so that a person who mastered first the Written Torah and then the Mishneh Torah would be in no need of any other book. Contemporary reaction was mixed, with a strong and immediate opposition which focused on the absence of sources and the belief that the work appeared to be intended to supersede study of the Talmud. Maimonides responded to these criticisms, and the Mishneh Torah endures as an influential work in Jewish religious thought. According to several authorities, a decision may not be rendered in opposition to a view of Maimonides, even where he apparently militated against the sense of a Talmudic passage, for in such cases the presumption was that the words of the Talmud were incorrectly interpreted. Likewise: "One must follow Maimonides, even when the latter opposed his teachers, since he surely knew their views, and if he decided against them, he must have disapproved their interpretation." The Mishneh Torah was later adapted for an Ashkenazi audience by Meir HaKohen in the form of the Haggahot Maimuniyyot. The work consists of supplemental notes to the Mishneh Torah with the objective of implanting contemporary Sephardic thought in Germany and France, while juxtaposing it to contemporary Ashkenazi halakhic customs.

== Sources ==
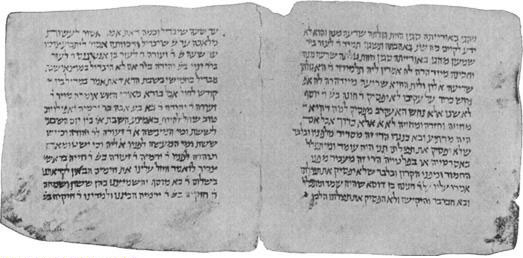
A page of a medieval Jerusalem Talmud manuscript, from the Cairo Geniza

Maimonides sought brevity and clarity in his Mishneh Torah and, as in his Commentary on the Mishnah, he refrained from detailing his sources, considering it sufficient to name his sources in the preface. He drew upon the Torah and the rest of Tanakh, both Talmuds, Tosefta, and the halachic Midrashim, principally Sifra and Sifre.

Later sources include the responsa (teshuvot) of the Geonim. The maxims and decisions of the Geonim are frequently presented with the introductory phrase "The Geonim have decided" or "There is a regulation of the Geonim", while the opinions of Isaac Alfasi and Alfasi's pupil Joseph ibn Migash are prefaced by the words "my teachers have decided" (although there is no direct source confirming ibn Migash as Maimonides' teacher). According to Maimonides, the Geonim were considered "unintelligible in our days, and there are but few who are able to comprehend them". There were even times when Maimonides disagreed with what was being taught in the name of the Geonim.

A number of laws appear to have no source in any of the works mentioned; it is thought that Maimonides deduced them through independent interpretations of the Bible or that they are based on versions of previous Talmudic texts no longer in our hands. Maimonides himself states a few times in his work that he possessed what he considered to be more accurate texts of the Talmud than what most people possessed at his time. The latter has been confirmed to a certain extent by versions of the Talmud preserved by the Yemenite Jews as to the reason for what previously were thought to be rulings without any source.

== Language and style ==
The Mishneh Torah is written in Hebrew, as the Mishnah had been. As he states in the preface, Maimonides was reluctant to write in Talmudic Aramaic, since it was not widely known. His previous works had been written in Judeo-Arabic.

The Mishneh Torah virtually never cites sources or arguments, and confines itself to stating the final decision on the law to be followed in each situation. There is no discussion of Talmudic interpretation or methodology, and the sequence of chapters follows the factual subject matter of the laws rather than the intellectual principle involved. Maimonides was criticized for not including sources by his contemporaries. Maimonides later regretted not adding sources but ultimately did not have time to update his work.

== Contents ==
=== The books and sections ===
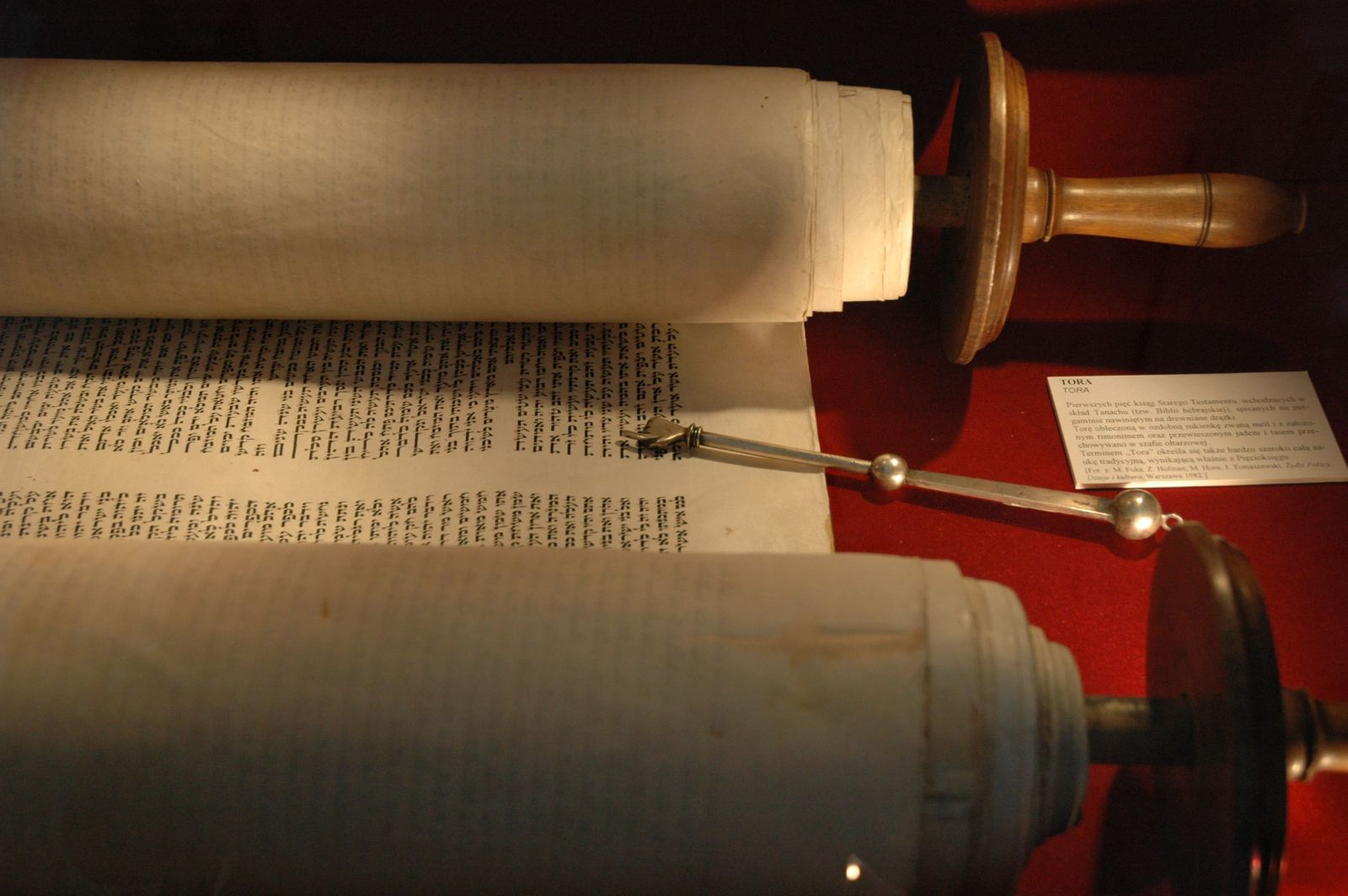
A Torah scroll

1. HaMadda (Knowledge)
  1. Yesodei ha-Torah (lit. 'Foundations of the Torah'): belief in God, and other Jewish principles of faith
  2. De'ot: general proper behavior
  3. Talmud Torah: Torah study
  4. Avodah Zarah: the prohibition against idolatry and foreign worship
  5. Teshuvah: the law and philosophy of repentance
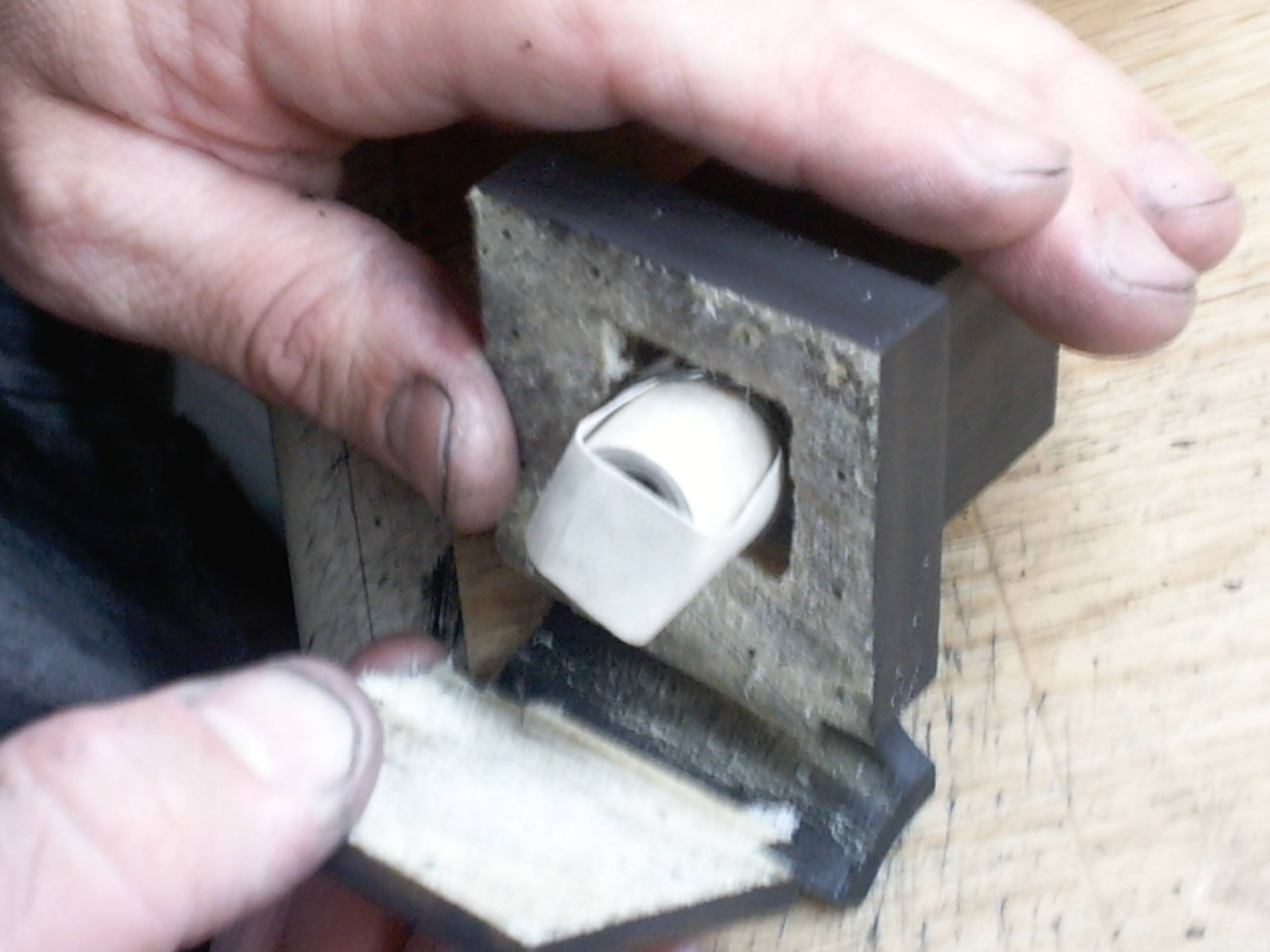
2. The single scroll of the arm-tefillin
  Ahavah (Love [of God])
  1. Kri'at Shema: recitation of the Shema
  2. Tefilah and Birkat Kohanim: prayer and the priestly blessing
  3. Tefillin, Mezuzah, and Sefer Torah
  4. Tzitzit
  5. Berachot: blessings
  6. Milah: circumcision
  7. Seder Tefilot: order of prayers
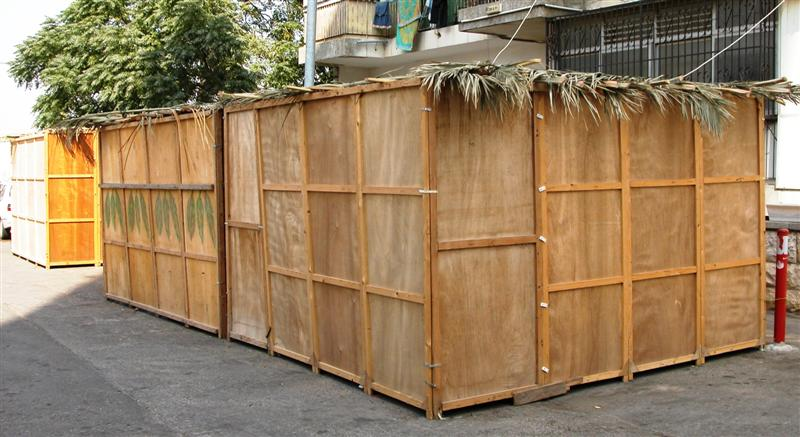
3. A sukkah booth
  Zemanim (Times)
  1. Shabbat: Sabbath
  2. Eruvin: a type of Rabbinic device that allows Jews to carry outdoors and walk longer distances on the Sabbath, as well as cook on holidays.
  3. Shevitat `Asor: laws of Yom Kippur, except for the Temple service (see Avodat Yom ha-Kippurim, below)
  4. Yom Tov: prohibitions on major Jewish holidays that are different from the prohibitions of Sabbath
  5. Hametz u-Matza: chametz and matzah (i. e., Passover)
  6. Shofar ve-Lulav ve-Sukkah: Shofar (i. e., Rosh Hashanah) and palm frond and Sukkah (i. e., Sukkot)
  7. Shekalim: money collected for the Temple in Jerusalem when it stood
  8. Kiddush HaChodesh: sanctification of the month
  9. Taaniyot: fasts
  10. Hanukah u-Megillah: Hanukkah and the Scroll of Esther (i. e., Purim)
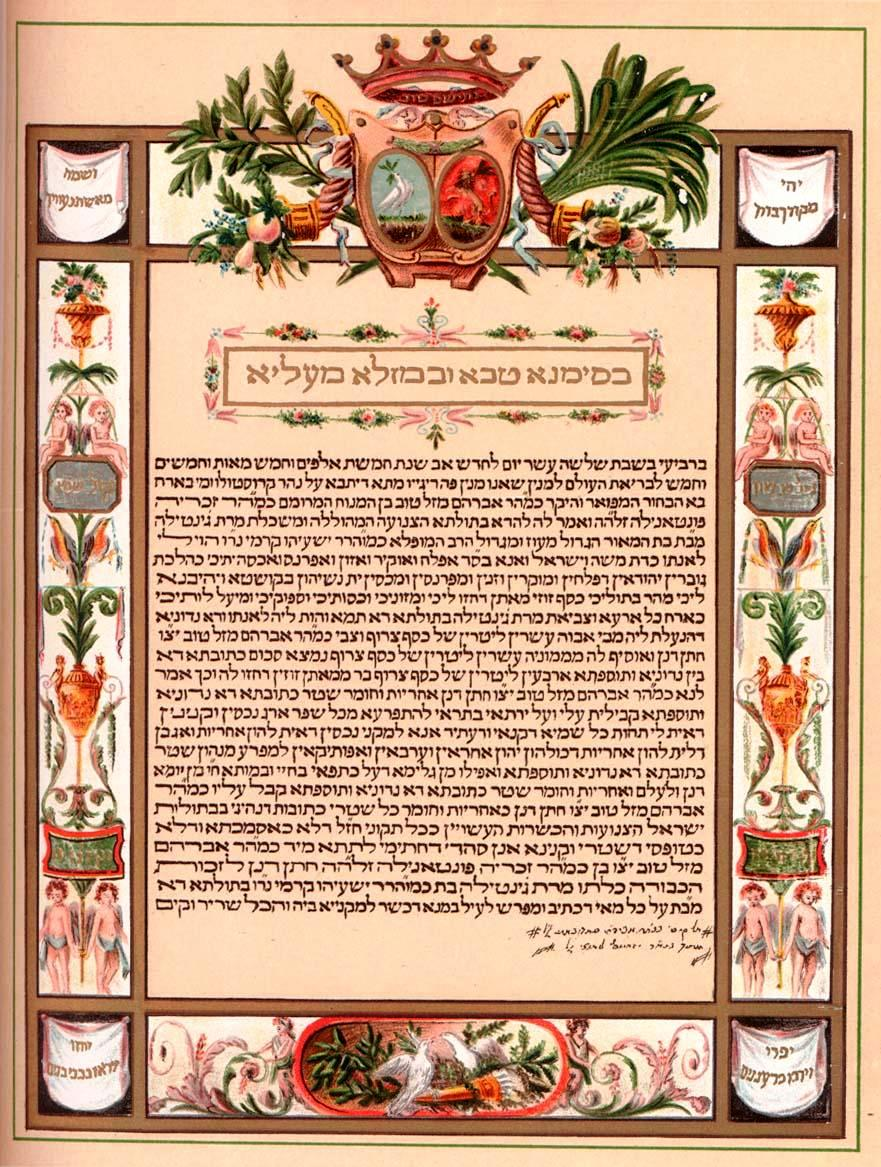
4. A Ketubah
  Nashim (Women):
  1. Ishut: laws of marriage, including kiddushin and the ketubah
  2. Geirushin: laws of divorce
  3. Yibum va-Chalitzah: laws of levirate marriage
  4. Na'arah Betulah: the law of a man who seduces or rapes an unmarried woman
  5. Sotah: laws concerning a woman suspected of infidelity
5. Kedushah (Holiness)
  1. Issurei Biah: forbidden sexual relations, including niddah, incest, and adultery. Since intermarriage with non-Jews is forbidden, the laws of conversion to Judaism are also included.
  2. Ma'akhalot Assurot: laws of forbidden foods (see kashrut)
  3. Shechitah: laws of ritual slaughter
6. Hafla'ah (Separation):
  1. Shevuot: Person-focused promise or commitment.
  2. Nedarim: Object-focused dedication or prohibition.
  3. Nezirot: laws of Nazirites
  4. Erachin: laws of donations to the temple
7. Zera'im (Seeds)
  1. Kilayim: laws of forbidden mixtures
  2. Aniyim: laws of obligatory gifts to the poor
  3. Terumot: laws of obligatory gifts to the priests
  4. Maaser: laws of tithes
  5. Sheini: laws of secondary tithes
  6. Bikurim: laws of first fruit offerings
  7. Shemittah: laws of the sabbatical year
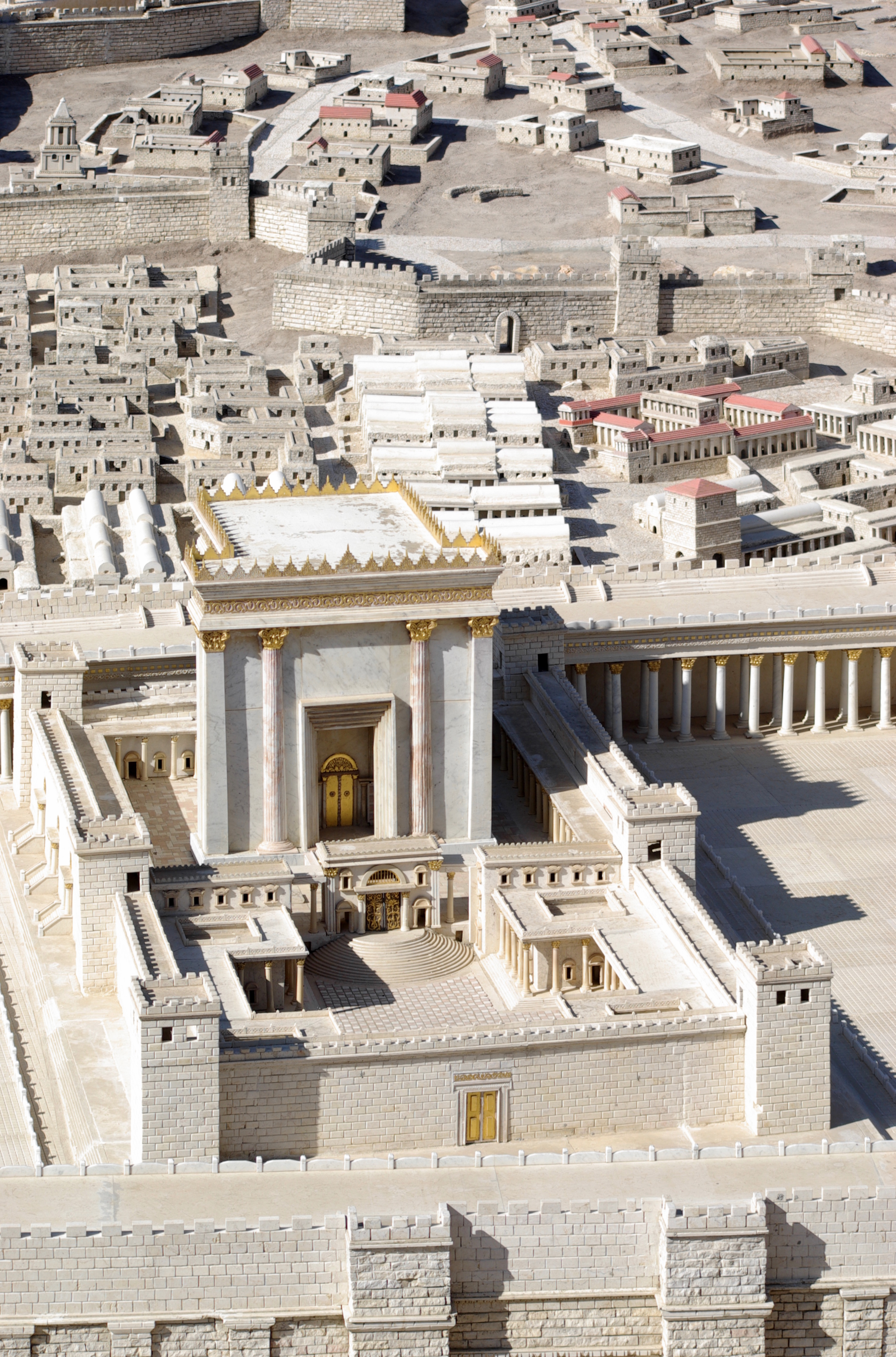
8. Herod's Temple, as imagined in the Holyland Model of Jerusalem
  Avodah (Divine Service):
  1. Bet HaBechirah: laws of God's chosen house
  2. K'lei HaMikdash: laws of the temple utensils and those who serve within
  3. Bi'at HaMikdash: laws of entry to the sanctuary
  4. Issurei HaMizbe'ach: laws of entities prohibited to be offered on the altar
  5. Ma'aseh HaKorbanot: laws of the sacrificial procedures
  6. Temidim uMusafim: laws of continual and additional offerings
  7. Pesule HaMukdashim: laws of consecrated entities that have been disqualified
  8. Avodat Yom HaKippurim: laws of the Yom Kippur service
  9. Me'ilah: laws of the misappropriation of consecrated property
9. Korbanot (Offerings)
  1. Korban Pesach: the Passover offering
  2. Chagigah: the festival offering
  3. Bechorot: laws regarding first-born children
  4. Shegagot: Offerings for Unintentional Transgressions
  5. Mechussarey Kapparah: Offerings for Those with Incomplete Atonement
  6. Temurah: Substitution
10. Taharah (Ritual Purity)
  1. Tumat Met: defilement by coming into contact with death
  2. Para Aduma: the red heifer
  3. Tumat Zara'at: defilement by tzara'at
  4. Metamei Mischkaw u-Moschaw tangential defilement
  5. She'ar Avot haTumot other sources of defilment
  6. Tumat Ochalin: defilement of foods
  7. Kelim: vessels
  8. Mikvaot: laws regarding the mikvah
11. Sefer Nezikim, also known as Sefer Nezikin (torts)
  1. Nizqei Mamon: property damage
  2. Geneivah: theft
  3. Gezeilah v'Avidah: robbery and lost property
  4. Hovel uMaziq: one who injures another
  5. Rotzeah uShmirat Nefesh: murderers and life preservation
12. Sefer Kinyan (Acquisition)
  1. Mechirah sale
  2. Zechiyah uMatanah: ownerless property and gifts
  3. Sh'chenim: neighbors
  4. Shluhin v'Shutafin: agents and partners
  5. 'Avadim: slaves
13. Sefer Mishpatim (Civil Laws)
  1. Schirut rent
  2. Sheilah uPiqadon borrowing and deposits
  3. Malveh v'Loveh lenders and borrowers
  4. To'en v'Nit'an plaintiff and reception
  5. Nahalot inheritance
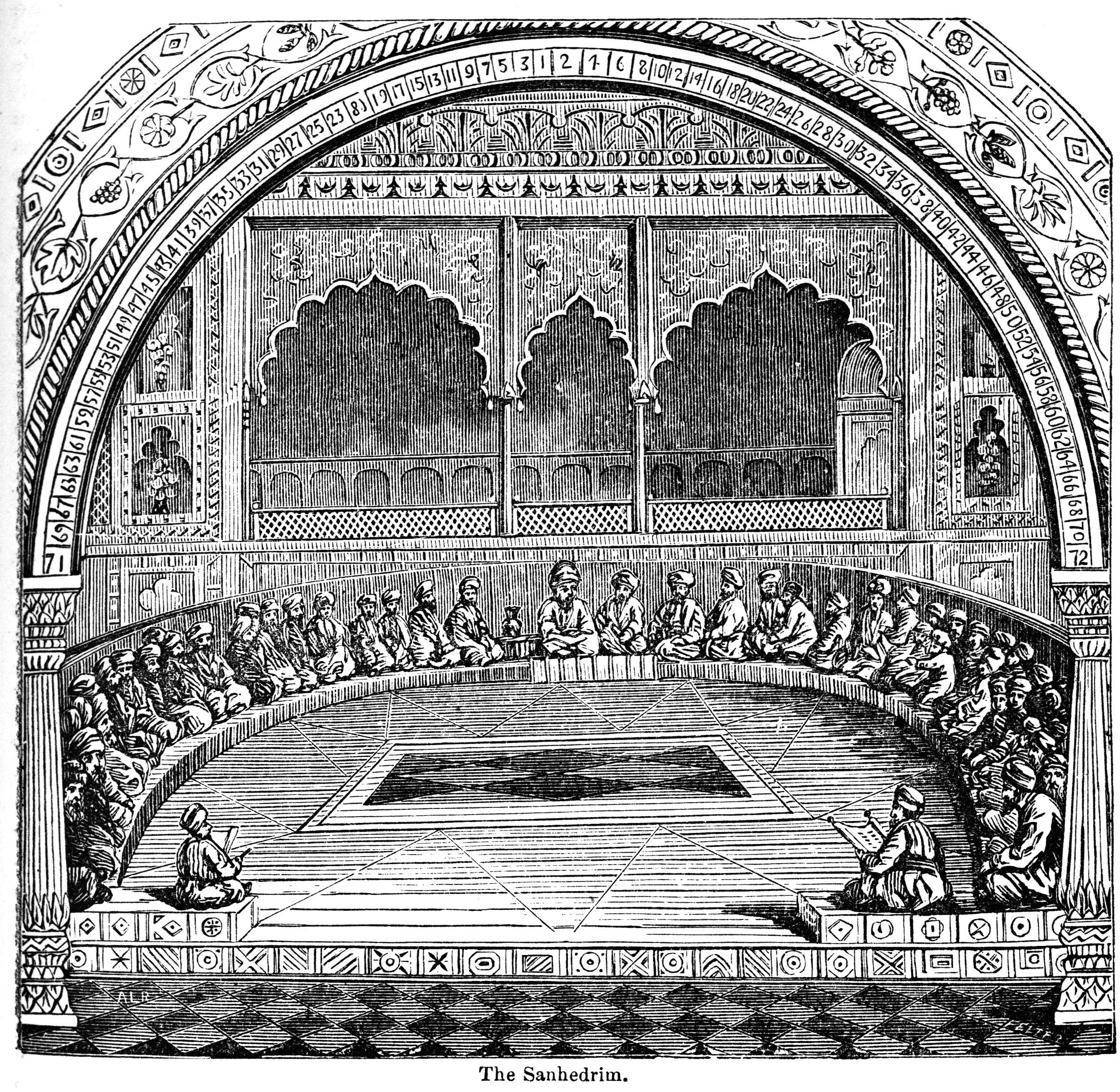
14. Artist's imagination of the Sanhedrin, from an 1883 encyclopedia
  Sefer Shoftim (Judges)
  1. Sanhedrin
  2. Edut: testimony
  3. Mamrim: heretics
  4. Evel: mourning
  5. Melachim uMilhamoteyhem: kings and wars

=== Notable laws ===
Mishneh Torah contains a widely quoted list of eight levels of charitable donation, where the first level is most preferable, and the eighth the least (see Tzedakah).

== Contemporary reaction ==
=== Contemporary criticism ===
The Mishneh Torah was strongly opposed almost as soon as it appeared. Major sources of contention were the absence of sources and the belief that the work appeared to be intended to supersede study of the Talmud. Some criticisms appear to have been less rational in nature. Indeed, Maimonides quotes the Talmud in stating that one should study the Talmud for a third of one's study time.

The most sincere but influential opponent, whose comments are printed parallel to virtually all editions of the Mishneh Torah, was Rabbi Abraham ben David of Posquières (Raavad III, France, 12th century).

Many critics were especially bitter against the new methods which he had employed, and the very peculiarities which he had regarded as merits in his work failed to please his opponents because they were innovations. Thus they reproached him because he departed from the Talmudic order and introduced a division and arrangement of his own, and because he dared to sometimes decide according to the Tosefta and the Jerusalem Talmud as against the Babylonian Talmud.

Especially sharp was the blame heaped upon Maimonides because he neglected to cite his sources; this was considered an evidence of his superciliousness, since it made it difficult, if not absolutely impossible, for scholars to verify his statements, and compelled them to follow his decisions absolutely. Yet, despite all this, Maimonides remained certain that in the future the Mishneh Torah would find great influence and acceptance. This is boldly expressed in a letter to his student Rabbi Yoseph ben ha-rav Yehudah:

And all that I've described to you regarding those who won't accept it [the Mishneh Torah] properly, that is uniquely in my generation. However, in future generations, when jealousy and the lust for power will disappear, all of Israel will subsist [lit. "we be satiated"] on it alone, and will abandon all else besides it without a doubt – except for those who seek something to be involved with all their lives, even though it doesn't achieve a purpose.

=== Maimonides' response ===
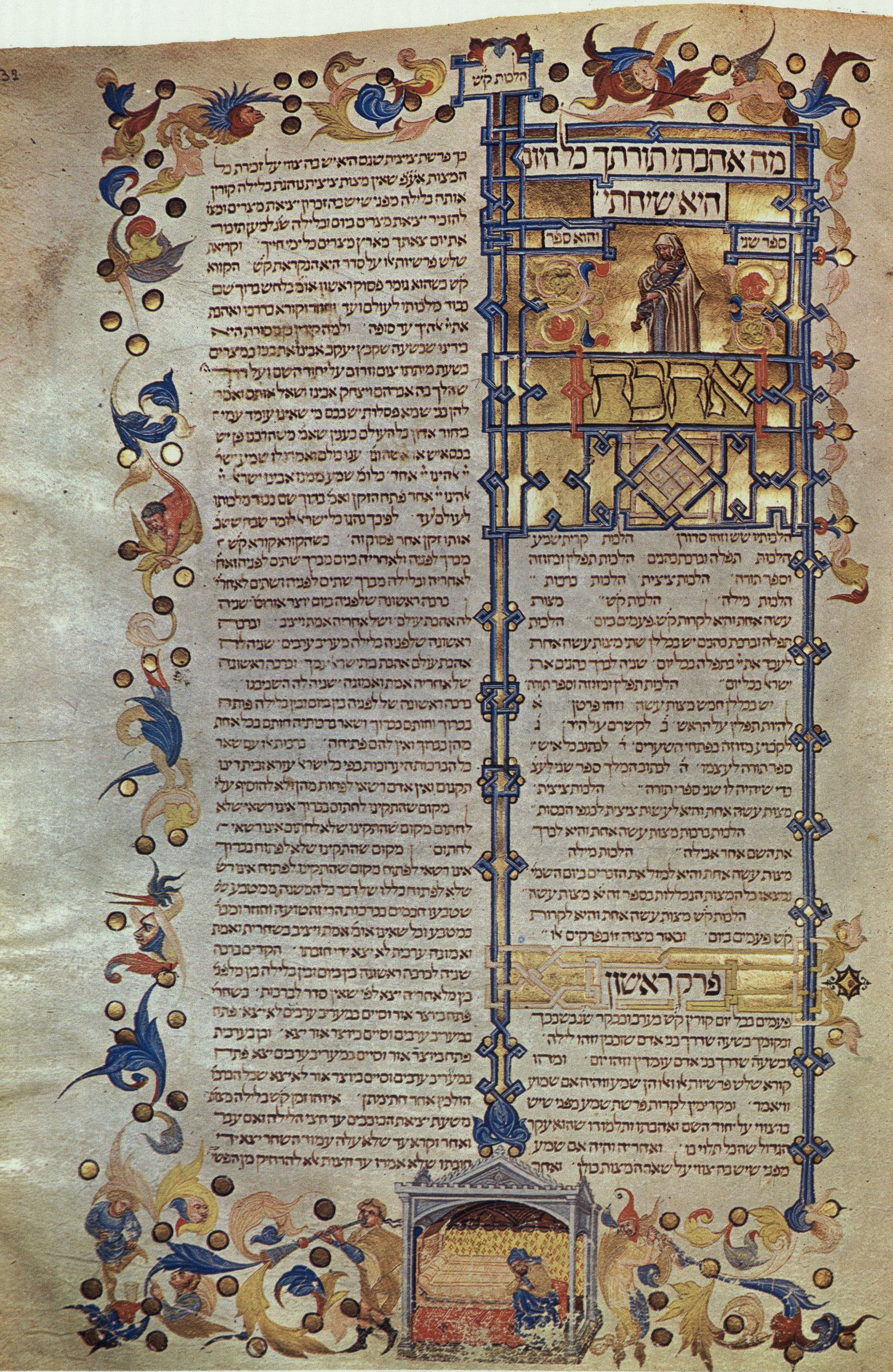
Sefer Ahavah, illuminated manuscript, ca 1351, Spain or Southern France

Maimonides defended himself. He had not composed this work for glory; he desired only to supply the necessary, but lacking, code, for there was danger lest pupils, weary of the difficult study, might go astray in decisions of practical importance.

He noted that it had never been his intention to abolish Talmudic studies altogether, nor had he ever said that there was no need of the "Halakot" of Rabbi Isaac Alfasi, for he himself had lectured to his pupils on the Gemara and, at their request, upon Alfasi's work. However, he did state that for the masses, there was no need for Talmud study, as the Mishne Torah, along with the written Torah, would suffice. He also stated that in-depth study of Talmudic discussions was "a waste of time", for the sole purpose of study was to know how to practice the law.

He said that his omission of his sources was due solely to his desire for brevity, although he regretted that he had not written a supplementary work citing his authorities for those halakot whose sources were not evident from the context. He would, however, should circumstances permit, atone for this error, however toilsome it might be to write such a supplement.

Raavad was forced to acknowledge that the work of Maimonides was a magnificent contribution, nor did he hesitate to praise him and approve his views in many passages, citing and commenting upon the sources.

Later works (e. g., Yosef Karo's Kesef Mishné) set out to find sources for Maimonides' decisions, and to resolve any disputes between him and the Raavad.

=== Yonah of Gerona ===
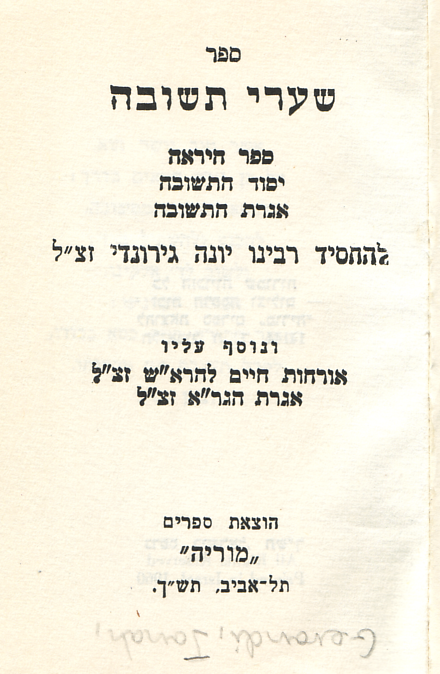
Title page from Sefer Shaarei Teshuvah (1960 pocket edition) by Yonah Gerondi (d.1263), first published in 1505.

Yonah of Gerona was a cousin of Nachmanides (Ramban) who was initially a member of the vocal opponents of the "Yad". He was involved in the burning of a number of copies of the Sefer ha-Madda in the 1240s. Regret followed, when he saw the Talmud being burnt in Paris in 1244, which he interpreted as a sign from Heaven that he had been mistaken. He set out to the Land of Israel, to ask forgiveness on Maimonides' grave in presence of ten witnesses, but failed to continue to his destination. He composed a classic work on penitence (titled Shaarei Teshuva, "The Gates of Repentance") during his soul-searching.

== Influence ==
Thus the work of Maimonides, notwithstanding the sharp attacks upon it, soon won general recognition as an authority of the first importance for ritual decisions. According to several authorities, a decision may not be rendered in opposition to a view of Maimonides, even though the latter apparently militated against the sense of a Talmudic passage, for in such cases the presumption was that the words of the Talmud were incorrectly interpreted. Likewise: "One must follow Maimonides even when the latter opposed his teachers, since he surely knew their views, and if he decided against them he must have disapproved their interpretation".

Even when later authorities, like Asher ben Jehiel (the Rosh), decided against Maimonides, it became a rule of the Oriental Jews to follow the latter, although the European Jews, especially the Ashkenazim, preferred the opinions of the Rosh in such cases. But the hope which Maimonides expressed, that in time to come his work and his alone would be accepted, has been only half fulfilled. His Mishneh Torah is indeed still very popular, but there has been no cessation in the study of other works.

Ironically, while Maimonides refrained from citing sources out of concern for brevity (or perhaps because he designed his work to be used without studying the Talmud or other sources first), the result has often been the opposite of what he intended. Various commentaries have been written which seek to supply the lacking source documentation, and, indeed, today, the Mishneh Torah is sometimes used as a sort of an index to aid in locating Talmudic passages. In cases where Maimonides' sources, or interpretation thereof, is questionable, the lack of clarity has at times led to lengthy analyses and debates – quite the opposite of the brevity he sought to attain. On the other hand, this only became an issue for students and scholars who studied the Mishneh Torah's sources. According to Maimonides himself, deducing law from the sources had already become a precarious proposition (for a number of reasons) – even in his own times. This necessarily relates to different subjects – like the influence of the exile, language skills, lack of time, censorship, and alternate versions of the Talmud.

== Printed editions and textual accuracy ==
Over time many textual errors and distortions have appeared in the various editions of Maimonides' Mishneh Torah. These inaccuracies are in the text of rulings, in the drawings made by Maimonides, as well as in the division (and thus the numbering) of rulings.

There are various reasons for these inaccuracies. Some are due to errors in the copying of manuscripts (before the age of printing) or mistakes by typesetters of later editions. Others are due to conscious attempts to "correct" the text, and yet others to Christian censorship (in countries under its control). In addition, Maimonides himself frequently edited the text of his own autograph copy, such that manuscripts copied from his own book did not preserve his later corrections. Thus, the received version may not be the text that Maimonides intended us to read.

Often the distortions in existing versions prompted questions on the "Mishne Torah" which were solved in many creative and different ways by the scholars throughout the generations; many of these questions don't arise in the first place if the version is corrected based upon reliable manuscripts.

In order to determine the exact version, scholars use reliable early manuscripts (some of them containing Maimonides' own signature), which are free of both Christian censorship and the changes of later readers who tried to "correct" the text on their own, without manuscript evidence. Since the middle of the 20th century there have been five scientific printings of the book:

- Rabbi Shabsai Frankel's edition includes critical editions of the "classical" commentators on Mishneh Torah as well as the book itself. However, the actual text of Mishneh Torah in this edition is based heavily on the printed editions, rather than the early manuscripts, whose variant readings are relegated to marginal notes and an apparatus at the end of each volume. All the volumes have been published.
- Rabbi Yosef Qafih's edition is based mainly on Yemenite manuscripts, and includes an extensive commentary by Qafih that surveys the discussions of the classical commentaries on Mishneh Torah and includes verbatim citation of previous commentaries in their entirety along with Qafih's comments.
- The Yad Peshutah edition by Rabbi Nahum Rabinovitch, Rosh Yeshivat Yeshivat Birkat Moshe in Ma'ale Adumim. This edition is based on a number of manuscripts (different ones are used for the different books, according to their reliability) and includes an original commentary on the Mishneh Torah.
- The Exact Mishneh Torah edition by Rabbi Yitzchak Shelat, also of Yeshivat Birkat Moshe, has no commentary. It compares the printed versions to the fixed version. So far, four volumes have been printed; the publisher expects to print two new volumes each year.
- A one-volume edition (1000 pages), published by Yeshivat Or Vishua and now in its third edition, reflects all the editions based on reliable manuscripts, accompanied by surrounding indexes but with no commentary. The text was checked again, based mainly on Qafih's edition. It gives variant readings from the other leading editions only in cases where the changes are meaningful. "The Mishne Torah Project" of the yeshiva also plans to publish a multi-volume pocket edition including vowel diacritics and cross-references to other passages and to Maimonides' other works. The pocket version of Sefer Ha-Madda (The Book of Knowledge) is already in print.

=== Codes and commentators ===
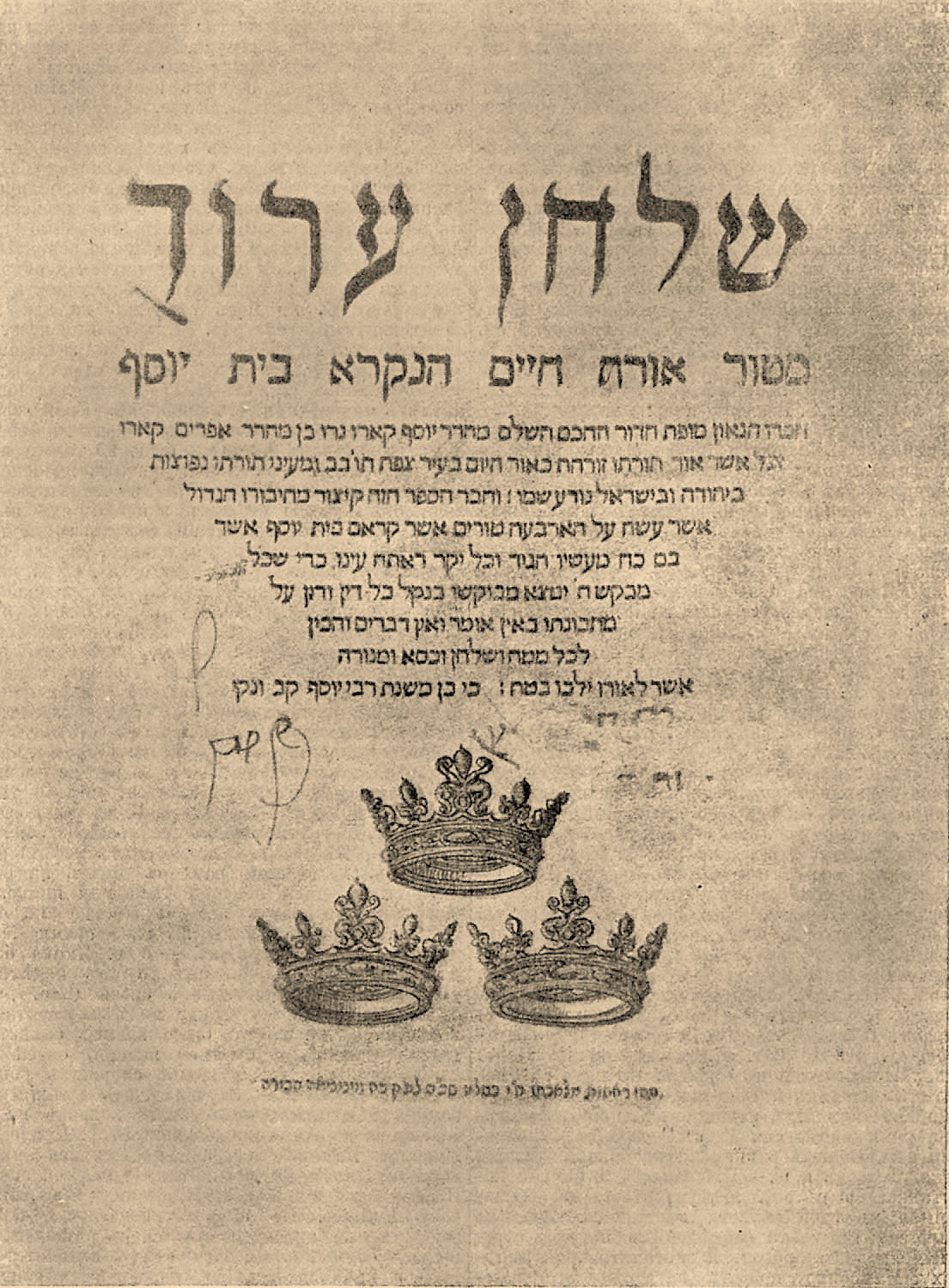
Title page of Karo's Shulchan Aruch

Mishneh Torah itself has been the subject of a number of commentaries, the most notable being Magid Mishné by Vidal de Toulouse, Migdal Oz by Shem Tov ben Abraham ibn Gaon Kesef Mishné by Yosef Karo, Mishné la-Melech by Judah Rosanes, Lechem Mishné by Abraham de Boton, Rabbi David ben Zimra (Radbaz) and Haggahot Maimuniyyot by Meir HaKohen (which details Ashkenazi customs). Most commentators aim to resolve criticisms of the Raavad, and to trace Maimonides' sources to the text of the Talmud, Midrash and Geonim.

Later codes of Jewish law, such as Arba'ah Turim by Rabbi Jacob ben Asher and Shulchan Aruch by Rabbi Yosef Karo, draw heavily on Maimonides' work, and in both, whole sections are often quoted verbatim.

Also there were many attempts down to the present time to force those who follow the rulings of Maimonides to change to the Shulchan Aruch or some other latter work of Minhag/Halakha. In response to this Karo wrote:

Who is he whose heart conspires to approach forcing congregations who practice according to the RaMBaM of blessed memory, to go by any one of the early or latter-day Torah authorities?! ... Is it not a case of a fortiori, that regarding the School of Shammai—that the halakhah does not go according to them—they [the Talmudic Sages] said 'if [one practices] like the School of Shammai [he may do so, but] according to their leniencies and their stringencies': The RaMBaM, is the greatest of all the Torah authorities, and all the communities of the Land of Israel and the Arab-controlled lands and the West [North Africa] practice according to his word, and accepted him upon themselves as their Chief Rabbi. Whoever practices according to him with his leniencies and his stringencies, why coerce them to budge from him? And all the more so if also their fathers and forefathers practiced accordingly: for their children are not to turn right or left from the RaMBaM of blessed memory. And even if communities that practice according to the Rosh or other authorities like him became the majority, they cannot coerce the minority of congregations practicing according to the RaMBaM of blessed memory, to practice like they do. And there is no issue here concerning the prohibition against having two courts in the same city ['lo tithgodedu'], since every congregation should practice according to its original custom…

== Present day ==
=== Study ===
The in-depth study of Mishneh Torah underwent a revival in Lithuanian Judaism in the late 19th century. The Lithuanians did not use it as a source book on practical halakha, as they followed the Ashkenazi authorities such as Moses Isserles and the Aruch ha-Shulchan. Instead, they used it as a guide to Talmudic interpretation and methodology. Given the fact that the Mishneh Torah entirely omits these topics, this reading seems paradoxical and against the grain. Their method was to compare the Talmudic source material with Maimonides' final decision, in order to reconstruct the rules of interpretation that must have been used to get from one to the other.

It thus remains an integral part of the Yeshiva curriculum. As regards Talmud study, it is one of the primary works referenced in analyzing the Talmudic text from a legal point of view, as mentioned. It is also a primary text referenced in understanding the Halakha as presented in the Arba'ah Turim and Shulchan Aruch; and Mishneh Torah is thus one of the first post-Talmudic sources consulted when investigating a question of Jewish law. See Yeshiva § Talmud study; Yeshiva § Jewish law; Halakha § Codes of Jewish law.

Prominent recent authorities who have written commentaries on the work include Rabbis Meir Simcha of Dvinsk (Ohr Somayach), Chaim Soloveitchik (Chiddushei Rabbeinu Chaim), Yitzchok Isaac Krasilschikov (Tevunah), Isser Zalman Meltzer (Even HaEzel), and, more recently, the Lubavitcher Rebbe, Rabbi Menachem Mendel Schneerson (Hadran al HaRambam), Elazar Shach (Avi Ezri), Nahum Rabinovitch (Yad Peshuta), and Rabbi Yosef Kapach. See also: List of commentaries on Mishneh Torah

Many scholarly speeches (e. g., the traditional Rabbi's speech on the Shabbat preceding Pesach and Yom Kippur) often revolve around a reconciliation between two passages in Maimonides' work. Rav Soloveitchik's work Al haTeshuvah discussing repentance in the light of Rambam's work, is widely studied and referenced (in Modern Orthodox communities) in the days leading up to Rosh Hashanah and Yom Kippur.

Today, thousands of Orthodox Jews, particularly Chabad Hasidim, participate in one of the annual study cycles of Mishneh Torah (one or three chapters a day), innovated by the Lubavitcher Rebbe, Rabbi Menachem Mendel Schneerson, in the spring of 1984. Parallel to the three- or one-chapter(s)-a-day cycle, there is a daily study of the Sefer Hamitzvot "Book of the Commandments", also authored by Maimonides.

A popular commentary, Rambam La'Am ('Rambam for the Nation'), was produced in 1971 by Rabbi Shmuel Tanchum Rubinstein (published by Mossad Harav Kook). This 20 volume set is widely used in daily Rambam study, in the Israeli Chabad and Religious Zionist communities. Adin Steinsaltz produced a similarly positioned commentary, published by Koren in 2017.

=== Practice ===
As for halakha l'maaseh (practical application of Jewish law), although the majority of Jews keep Jewish law according to various other Rabbinic codes organized around the Shulchan Aruch, an increasing number of Yemenite Jews, as well as various other individuals, are being attracted to the Mishneh Torah as their choice code of Jewish law by which to live. They may consider it a return to the original ways of their ancestors.

One individual who contributed to this phenomenon was Rabbi Yiḥyah Qafiḥ, the founder of the Dor Daim movement in Yemen. The Mishneh Torah had always been a leading authority in the Baladi (local, traditionalist) Yemenite community – as a matter of local custom. Scholarly work in this vein was continued by his grandson, Rabbi Yosef Qafiḥ (also spelled Gafah, Qafahh or Kapach). Yosef Qafiḥ is credited with the publication of an almost encyclopedic commentary to the entire Mishneh Torah, including his own insights, set to a text of the Mishneh Torah based upon the authoritative, hand-written manuscripts preserved by the Yemenite Jewish community. The introduction to his edition of the Mishneh Torah is well known in itself as a defense for the keeping of halakha according to the Mishneh Torah.

During his lifetime, Yosef Qafiḥ was a leading figure in the Baladi Yemenite community as a whole, as well as the Dor Daim or strict "Rambamists". After Qafiḥ died, Rabbi Rasson Arusi has largely filled his place as the leading public representative of the Baladi and Rambamist communities.

Rabbi Rasson Arusi is founder of 'Halikhoth Ahm Yisroel' and Makhon Mishnath haRambam, and head of the marriage department of the Rabbinate of Israel, as well as chief rabbi of city of Kiryat Ono in Israel. Arusi and the organization Makhon Mishnath haRambam have published several books filled with commentary on various parts and aspects of the Mishneh Torah as well as topics related to the Yemenite Jewish community. Besides the works of Qafiḥ and Arusi, there are a number of other commentaries to the Mishneh Torah written by leaders of the Yemenite Jewish community.

=== Ethnology ===
Scholars specializing in the study of the history and subculture of Judaism in premodern China (Sino-Judaica) have noted this work has surprising similarities with the liturgy of the Kaifeng Jews, descendants of Persian merchants who settled in the Middle Kingdom during the early Song dynasty. Beyond scriptural similarities, Michael Pollak comments the Jews' Pentateuch was divided into 53 sections according to the Persian style. He also points out:

There is no proof, to be sure, that Kaifeng Jewry ever had direct access to the works of "the Great Eagle", but it would have had ample time and opportunity to acquire or become acquainted with them well before its reservoir of Jewish learning began to run out. Nor do the Maimonidean leanings of the kehillah contradict the historical evidence that has the Jews arriving in Kaifeng no later than 1126, the year in which the Sung fled the city--and nine years before Maimonides was born. In 1163, when the kehillah built the first of its synagogues, Maimonides was only twenty-eight years old, so that it is highly unlikely that even his earliest authoritative teachings could by then have reached China [...] The compliance of their descendants with certain uniquely Maimonidean interpretations implies that the channels of communication between the kehillah and extra-Chinese Jewish centers were still open several generations after its establishment.

The work was being used by the Jews of India during Maimonides' lifetime. In response to a letter from the Rabbis of Lunel, France requesting him to translate his Guide of the Perplexed from Arabic to Hebrew, Maimonides applauded their piety in light of what he viewed as the general stagnation of religiosity throughout the rest of the Jewish world. However, he commented: "Only lately some well-to-do men came forward and purchased three copies of my code [the Mishneh Torah] which they distributed through messengers... Thus, the horizon of these Jews was widened, and the religious life in all communities as far as India revived." Further support for the Mishneh Torah circulating in India comes in the form of a letter sent from Safed, Israel, to Italy in 1535. In it, David del Rossi claimed that a Tripolitan Jewish merchant had told him the India town of Shingly (Cranganore) had a large Jewish population who dabbled in yearly pepper trade with the Portuguese. As far as their religious life, he wrote they: "only recognize the Code of Maimonides and possessed no other authority or Traditional law."

Adam Schiff chose to take his Senate oath of office on a second edition (Soncino, 1490) of the Mishneh Torah in 2024, "in part because of his concerns about the state of the rule of law" and also because of "his nerdy interest in how old this volume is and how comprehensive it is".

== Translations ==
The first known English translation of the Mishneh Torah was made in 1832 by Herman Hedwig Bernard, professor of Hebrew at Cambridge University. Bernard's work is titled The Main Principles of the Creed and Ethics of the Jews Exhibited in Selections from the Yad Hachazakah of Maimonides, with A Literal English Translation, Copious Illustrations from the Talmud, &c.. Bernard's work includes a glossary of words and concepts which appear in the Mishneh Torah.

The 1888 work Dat Vadin by Rabbi Moses Frankel, published in Odessa, is a Russian language summary of the Mishneh Torah.

In 1944, Philip Birnbaum published an excerpted translation published as Maimonides' Mishneh Torah: Yad Hazakah.

The Yale Judaica Series edition of the Mishneh Torah was started in 1949 and is almost complete, except "the Book of Knowledge", which is in progress:

- Introduction, Isadore Twersky (1982) ISBN 0-300-02846-6
- Book 2, The Book of Love, Menachem Kellner (2004) ISBN 0-300-10348-4
- Book 3, The Book of Seasons, Solomon Gandz and Hyman Klein (1961) ISBN 0-300-00322-6
- Book 3, Treatise 8, The Sanctification of the New Moon, Solomon Gandz, Julian Obermann, Otto Neugebauer (1956) ISBN 0-300-00476-1
- Book 4, The Book of Women, Isaac Klein (1972) ISBN 0-300-01438-4 / ISBN 978-0-300-01438-9
- Book 5, The Book of Holiness, Leon Nemoy, Louis I. Rabinowitz, and Philip Grossman (1965) ISBN 0-300-00846-5
- Book 6, The Book of Asseverations, B. D. Klein (1962) ISBN 0-300-00633-0
- Book 7, The Book of Agriculture, Isaac Klein (1979) ISBN 0-300-02223-9
- Book 8, The Book of Temple Service, Mendell Lewittes (1957) ISBN 0-300-00497-4
- Book 9, The Book of Offerings, Herbert Danby, (1950) ISBN 0-300-00398-6
- Book 10, The Book of Cleanness, Herbert Danby, (1954) ISBN 0-300-00397-8
- Book 11, The Book of Torts, Hyman Klein (1954) ISBN 0-300-00632-2
- Book 12, The Book of Acquisitions, Isaac Klein (1951) ISBN 0-300-00631-4
- Book 13, The Book of Civil Laws, Jacob J. Rabinowitz (1949) ISBN 0-300-00845-7
- Book 14, The Book of Judges, Abraham M. Hershman (1949) ISBN 0-300-00548-2

In 1981 Feldheim Publishers published an edition of the first two books based on the Oxford manuscript, with the translation of Moses Hyamson. As the translation was made from the traditional printed texts, it does not always match the Hebrew.

Moznaim Publishing Corporation has published an annotated English translation of the Mishneh Torah by Rabbi Eliyahu Touger. This edition is available online on chabad.org

In November 2006 Mayer Alter Horowitz of the Boston Hasidic dynasty announced that The Nesher Hagodol Legacy Foundation had begun a translation "Perush HaMeir" elucidating and explaining the Mishneh Torah.

== See also ==
- List of commentaries on Mishneh Torah
- Hebrew translations of all of Maimonides' Jewish works (as opposed to, e. g., medical) by Rabbi Yosef Kapach: Rambam
- Shulchan Aruch
