= Unterman =

Unterman is a surname. Notable people with the surname include:

- Isser Yehuda Unterman (1886–1976), Ashkenazi Chief Rabbi of Israel
- Renee Unterman (born 1954), American politician
- Reva Unterman, English writer

== See also ==
- 22485 Unterman, a minor planet named after Nathan Unterman
- Untermann
