= Avrohom Yeshaya Karelitz =

Belarusian-born Israeli haredi rabbi (1878–1953)

Rabbi Avraham Yeshayahu Karelitz אברהם ישעיהו קרליץ
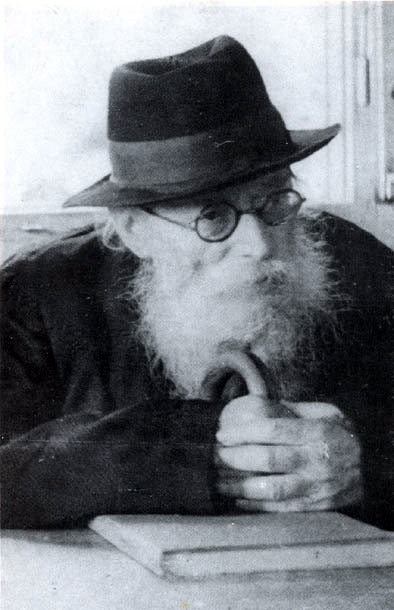

Personal life
- Born: 7 November 1878 Kosava, Grodno Governorate, Russian Empire
- Died: 24 October 1953 (aged 74) Bnei Brak, Israel
- Buried: Bnei Brak
- Spouse: Bashe Bei
- Parents: Shmaryahu Yosef Karelitz (father); Rasha Leah Katzenellenbogen-Epstein (mother)
- Occupation: Rabbi

Religious life
- Religion: Judaism

Avraham Yeshayahu Karelitz (Hebrew: אברהם ישעיהו קרליץ; 7 November 1878 – 24 October 1953), also known as the Chazon Ish (Hebrew: החזון איש) after the title of his 23 volume magnum opus on Jewish religious law, was born in Belarus, and after settling in Israel in 1933, went on to become one of the most influential Haredi rabbis of his generation. He tackled complex modern halachic problems, introduced a set of standard halachic measurements and wrote extensively about agricultural challenges pertaining to the Land of Israel in Jewish law. He opposed Zionism and helped rehabilitate the Torah world following the Holocaust by securing an exemption from military service for yeshiva students in Israel.

== Biography ==
=== Youth ===
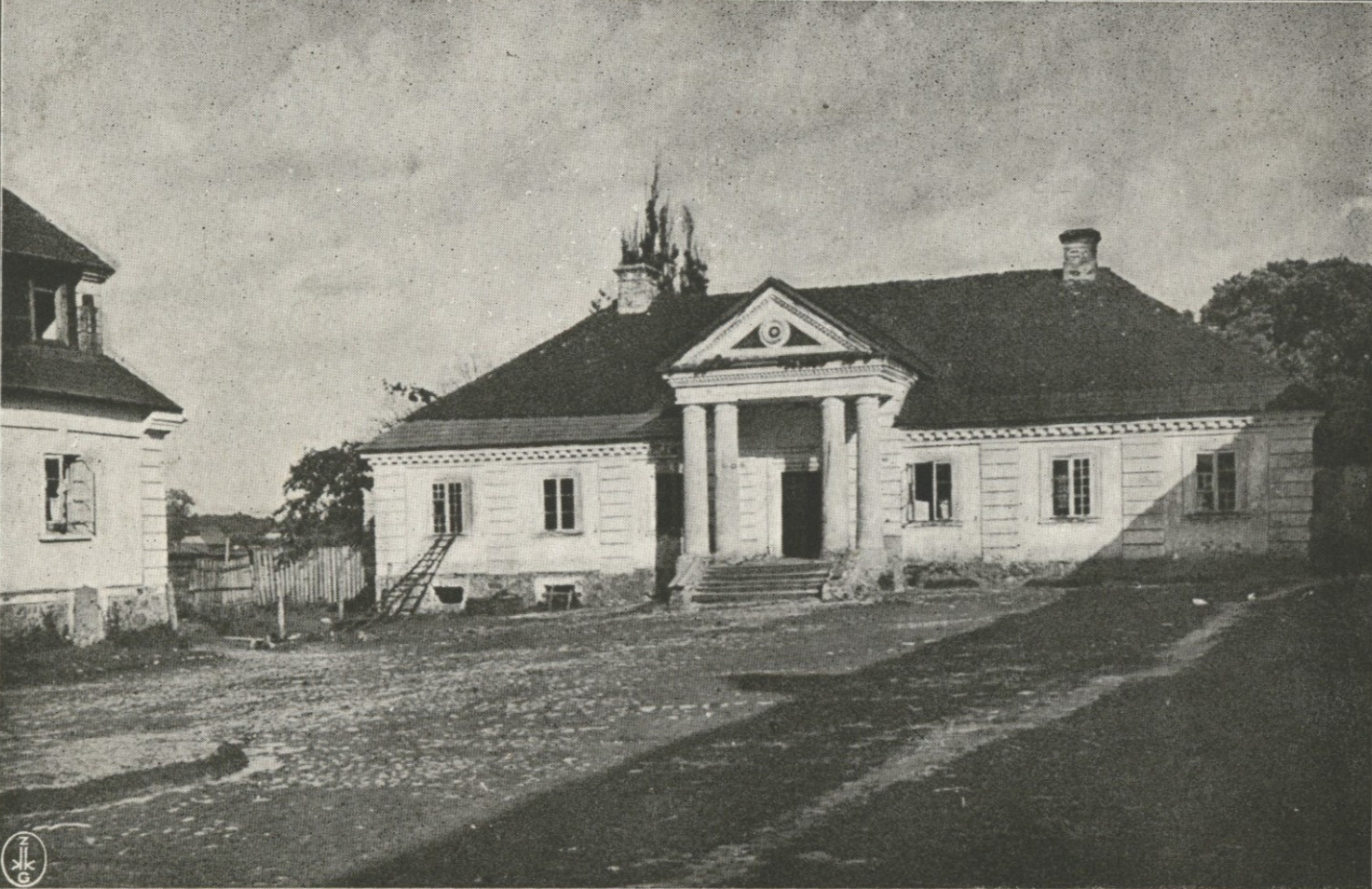
Kosava, 1930

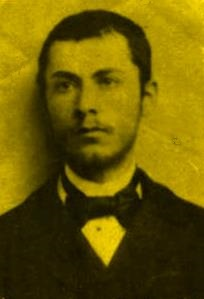
Karelitz in his youth

Born in the town of Kosava in the Grodno Governorate of the Russian Empire (today in Belarus). His father, Shmaryahu Yosef Karelitz, served as the town's rabbi. His mother, Rashe Leah, was the daughter of the previous town rabbi, Shaul Katzenelnbogen.

Except for a short period in which he studied in the "kibbutz" of R' Chaim Ozer Grodzinski in Vilna, Avraham Yeshayahu Karelitz did not study in a cheder or yeshiva, and apparently was never officially ordained as a rabbi. His Torah education was received from his father and a private melamed named R' Moshe Tuvia. He quotes Torah teachings from this teacher in several places in his writings. According to David Frankel, Karelitz said that his father hired a private melamed to keep him away from the company of children his age and idle chatter. For most of his life, he was self-taught. His mother later told Rebbetzin Malka Finkel, wife of Rabbi Eliezer Yehuda Finkel, that even in childhood he studied with great diligence. According to her, he told her several times that he did not enjoy studying, but he studied out of the recognition that "this is a good thing," hoping that the sweetness would come later. His brother, Rabbi Meir Karelitz, said in his eulogy that at his bar mitzvah he committed to devote all his strength to Torah. According to a common story, his talents were not noticeable in childhood, though some deny this detail. Binyamin Brown accepts both versions and speculates that although he was indeed talented, he was regarded in his environment as average due to his different study method, which did not meet the accepted criteria of yeshiva-style scholarship.

Brown, a scholar of Karelitz’s life and thought, said that there is a noticeable influence of Jewish Enlightenment literature in his writings and also in a few surviving poems he wrote. This influence is expressed in his florid and stylistic writing, and in his strict use of Hebrew free of foreign words, unlike other rabbis of his time. In contrast, Shlomo Havlin claimed that the evidence for this assumption is anachronistic, since rabbinic literature had always been written in Hebrew, whereas Yiddish literature was then in its heyday.

Karelitz was known from a young age as a quiet person. To one of his associates, Yitzhak Gerstenkorn, founder of the city Bnei Brak, he said that in his teens he decided not to utter anything that wasn't fully formed in his mind, but since he tends to write well-formed ideas, it is rare that he has anything to say aloud.

In the year 5651 (1891), his grandfather Rabbi Shimshon Karelitz died. His son, Rabbi Shmaryahu Yosef Karelitz, was absent from the town that day, and the grandsons Meir and Avraham Yeshayahu, aged 16 and 12 respectively, prepared eulogies themselves, which the elder brother Meir read at the funeral.

In his youth Karelitzh traveled to study in Brisk. Binyamin Brown also discusses the version that his journey was to Volozhin Yeshiva; Isser Yehuda Unterman said that Karelitz studied in Brisk, did not find his place there and returned home to Kosava. The reason for the trip was to study from Rabbi Yosef Dov HaLevi Soloveitchik of Brisk, who taught in Brisk after leaving Volozhin Yeshiva until his death in 5652 (1892). Several speculations have been raised about his quick return home: from homesickness, to halachic issues (Chadash prohibition, which was treated leniently in Brisk based on the ruling of Rabbi Joel Sirkis, who once served as the local rabbi), and even poor spiritual environment in Brisk.

In the year 5661 (1901), several responses under his name were published in the journal "HaPeles", under the pen name "A.Ya.SH. from Kassava [=Kosava]". In one of them he defended the accepted calculation in the Hebrew calendar against a possible objection raised by another rabbi.

In the winter of 5665 (1905) Karelitz stayed for an extended time in the city of Vilna and studied in the kibbutz of Chaim Ozer Grodzinski there. He may have remained there due to travel disruptions caused by the 1905 Russian Revolution, which lasted the entire year.

=== Period of Kvedarna ===
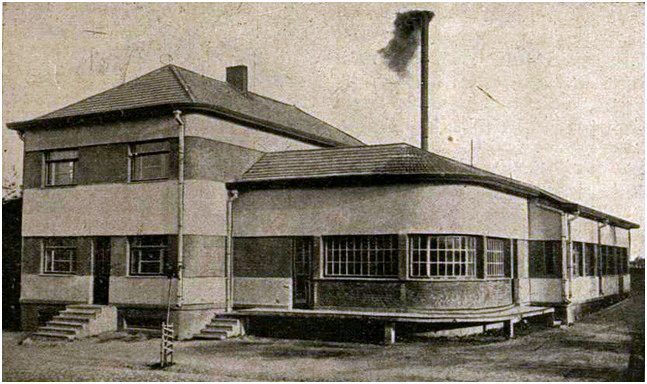
The dairy cooperative of Kvedarna (1938)

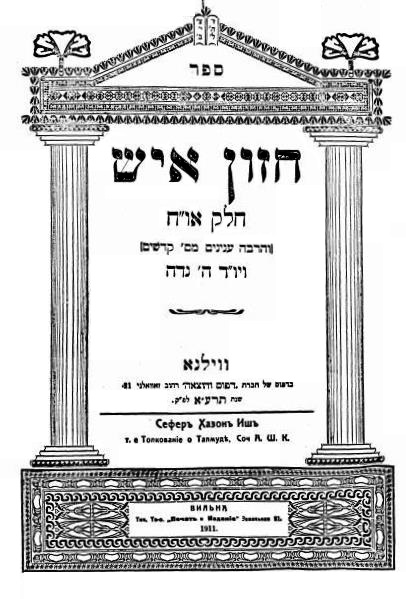
Title page of the book "Chazon Ish", first edition, Vilna 1911

In the winter of 5666 (end of 1905), at the age of 27, he became engaged to Batya (Basha), daughter of Mordechai Bay, a merchant from the town of Kvedarna (Yiddish: Kovidan) in western Lithuania, who was significantly older than him. Exact details about her year of birth, and thus about their age gap, are unknown. According to the author Chaim Grade, her age was twice his; however, it may be that the fictional character “Machazeh Avraham”, undoubtedly based on the Chazon Ish, is not identical in all its details. The Karelitz family agreed to the match because she was considered an industrious and God-fearing woman, and also because their son Avraham Yeshayahu was known to be a heart patient and stringent in halacha, and was seeking a wife who would take on the burden of livelihood and allow him to study Torah. After the "Tna'im” (conditions) were signed, it became clear that the father-in-law would not be able to meet his financial obligations and that the intended bride was older than thought; because of this, the family of the Chazon Ish sought to withdraw from the match, but he refused, arguing that one must not shame a daughter of Israel under any circumstance and once terms were agreed upon, one should not back out.

The wedding took place three months after the engagement, on 11 Shevat 5666 (6 February 1906), in Kovidan, and the couple made their home in that town. Batya opened a fabric shop there and supported the family, and the Chazon Ish devoted his time to Torah study. Rabbi Avraham Horowitz reports that Batya testified her husband sometimes helped her manage the household accounts, but still, when the Chazon Ish needed something, he had to ask her for money.

The Kovidan period is mentioned by the Chazon Ish's biographers as his "golden era", during which he studied Torah undisturbed. He studied in chavruta with the town’s rabbi, Rabbi Moshe Rozin, author of Nezer HaKodesh, and delivered Gemara lessons in the local synagogue. He would be in the beit midrash from early morning until night. Rabbi Rozin held the Chazon Ish in high esteem and told Rabbi Chaim Ozer Grodzinski of him in Vilna. According to Brown, this was the point when the connection between the two men was formed. Among his study companions in Kovidan were Rabbi Moshe Ilovitzky, Rabbi David Nachman Koloditzky, and his future brother-in-law Rabbi Shmuel Eliyahu Kahan, with whom the Chazon Ish studied Tractate Niddah for a time, and through this connection arranged a match between him and his sister Badana. In Kovidan, the Chazon Ish founded a yeshiva with the local rabbi.

In the year 5671 (1911), the first book in the series "Chazon Ish" was published, on topics of "Orach Chayim", "Kodashim", and the laws of Niddah. The book was published anonymously and only the name of the publisher, his brother Rabbi Moshe Karelitz, appeared on the title page, with no approbations. His books were not particularly popular, likely due to the difficult and concise writing style and the interpretive method that differed from the analytic method common in the Lithuanian Torah world. According to Brown, the difficulty in understanding his words stems from the fact that the author assumes the reader has already studied the sugya with its commentaries and is aware of the difficulties it raises, which the Chazon Ish seeks to solve. The Chazon Ish's nephew, Rabbi Eliezer Alpha, once asked him, comparing it to Rabbi Chanokh Eigesh’s Marcheshet, published at the same time: "Your book is hard, and his is easy. And if we're already making an effort, we may as well study the works of the Rashba!" It is told that the Chazon Ish replied: "Once one toils over the Rashba, there’s no need to toil over the Chazon Ish."

Due to the blood libel against Mendel Beilis and the Beilis trial (1911–1913), during which the defense submitted to the Russian court expert testimony disproving the blood libel in both private and general terms, Rabbi Karelitz, then age 34, wrote a treatise published in his letters collection under the title "To a Foreign Minister". In this treatise, of which only the initial parts survived, there are twenty-six short chapters, in which he surveys the Jewish outlook regarding the sanctity of human life and seeks to prove that ritual murder contradicts the fundamental principles of Judaism. Brown speculates that the missing parts of the treatise were never written, as it eventually became clear to him that his words would not receive the court's attention.

=== Period of World War I ===
==== Stoybtz ====
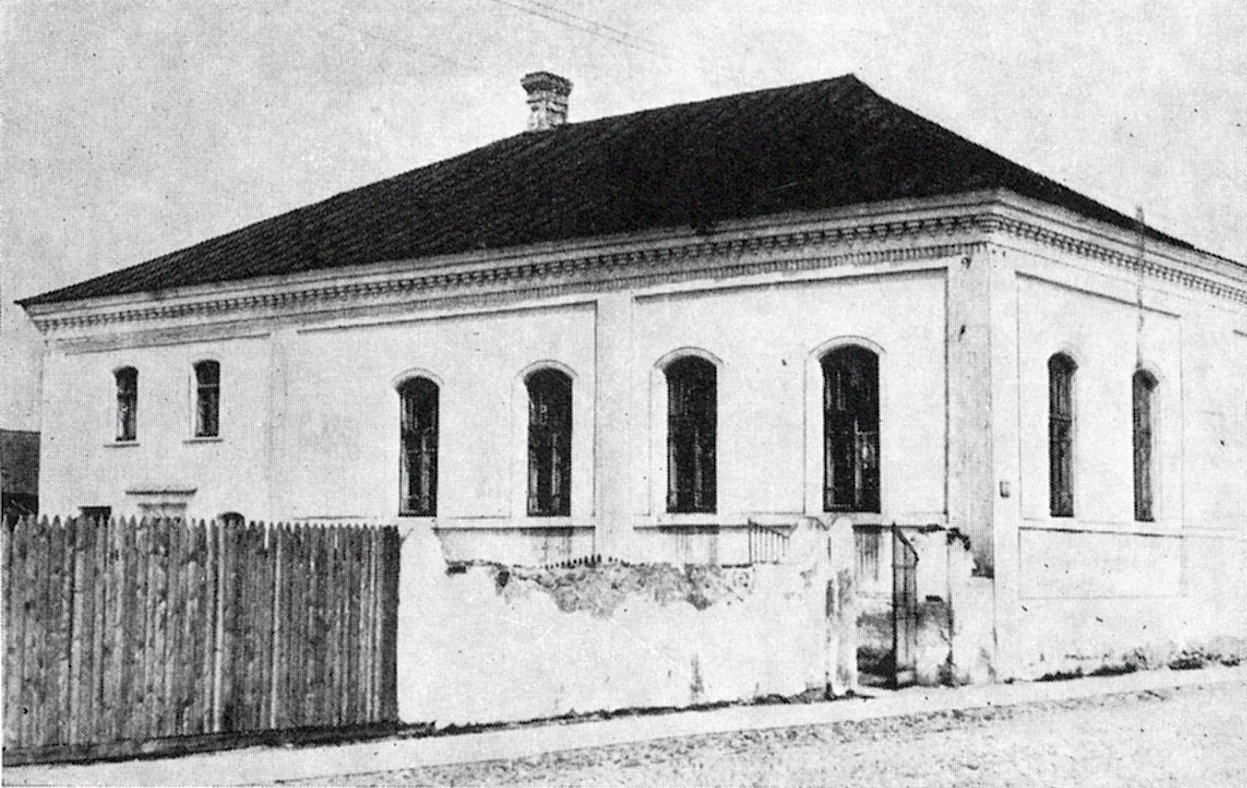
The great Beit Midrash in Stoybtz during the Chazon Ish’s stay in the town

During the course of Eastern Front (World War I), the Imperial German Army occupied large swaths of historical Lithuania, and many residents from battle areas fled their homes and became refugees. The Chazon Ish and his wife, like many Jews of Kovidan, also fled to Russian-controlled territory and settled in the town of Stoybtz (Stołpce). Batya Karelitz opened a fabric shop in Stoybtz as well, and the Chazon Ish continued his studies.

Although the Chazon Ish opposed holding a rabbinic post all his life, when the town’s rabbi, Rabbi Yoel Sorotzkin, was forced to leave by Russian orders, the Chazon Ish unofficially replaced him at his request, until he returned. According to another version, the residents begged Rabbi Karelitz to take the position after Rabbi Sorotzkin left, but he refused. According to one source, the Chazon Ish declined to bear communal responsibility, except in one case, when he joined efforts to restore the local mikveh that burned down in a fire. That fire is described in a rare heading to one of the Chazon Ish’s commentaries on Tractate Kelim:

Stoybtzi, where nearly the whole town burned on Monday, 25 Sivan, and all its residents under pressure and distress with no home to live in and no place to lodge.

Rabbi Shmaryahu Greineman recounted that when a plague broke out in town and the members of the chevra kadisha feared burial due to contagion, the Chazon Ish took it upon himself to bury the dead out of respect for the deceased. As a provocative act, he took one of the corpses on his shoulders and carried it to the cemetery, which caused the chevra kadisha members to return to their role. He later explained that his rationale was that if the dead were not buried, the entire town would be in mortal danger.

In Stoybtz, the Chazon Ish hosted a group of young Jewish refugees in his home, among them Mordechai Shulman, who later founded Slabodka Yeshiva (Bnei Brak) and was one of his close associates. Among the exiles to Stoybtz were also students of the Mir Yeshiva, along with their mashgiach Rabbi Yerucham HaLevi Leibowitz, and a connection was formed between them. There are recorded cases of students from the Stoybtz area who came there to converse in Torah with the Chazon Ish.

==== Minsk ====
The Chazon Ish and his wife lived in Stoybtz during the first four years of the war, but at some point moved to the city of Minsk. After the October Revolution in 1917, the Belarusian Democratic Republic was declared. This state, which lacked broad international recognition, lasted briefly, and in 1919 the Communists took over and turned it into the Byelorussian Soviet Socialist Republic.

At first, the Chazon Ish moved alone to Minsk and lived in an apartment provided by Rabbi Zalman Sorotzkin, while Batya continued managing the fabric store in Stoybtz and traveled to Minsk for Sabbaths. His cousin Shaul Lieberman described those days in Minsk:

In those years he sat in his home in Minsk and studied all day and night. On Shabbat his wife came from Stoybtzi… I believe those were his best days, because he was still unknown… the public generally did not know of his existence, and he enjoyed that very much. He could seclude himself and study. Jews did not disturb him, and his mouth did not cease from learning. His wife would send him enough for sustenance, and he sufficed with little, from one Sabbath to the next.

— Shaul Lieberman, "In the Company of Rabbis"

On 21 Iyar 5677 (1917), his father Rabbi Shmaryahu Yosef Karelitz died in Kosava, and was succeeded as town rabbi by his son-in-law, Rabbi Abba Swiatycki. The news of his father's death reached the Chazon Ish only four months later, on 29 Elul 5677, via the Red Cross. From then on, the Chazon Ish made a practice of studying the entire Tractate Chullin on his father's yahrtzeit, as his father had written the work Beit Talmud on that tractate.

The Chazon Ish's seclusion for continuous Torah study during his time in Minsk was so complete that he did not go to prayers at the synagogue except on Shabbat and on Monday and Thursday, when there is Torah reading. In those days, he wrote the commentaries later published on Tractate Eruvin and other topics in Orach Chayim and Yoreh De’ah. In Minsk, the Chazon Ish met leading Torah sages who were also staying there because of the war, including Rabbi Chaim Soloveitchik, Rabbi Nosson Tzvi Finkel, and Rabbi Yeruchom Levovitz.

=== Vilna period ===
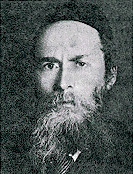
The Chazon Ish around the time of his arrival in Vilna, circa 1920

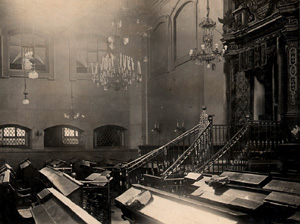
Interior of the Great Synagogue of Vilna, around 1920

After the war, the Karelitz family returned to Stoybtz, which was in Soviet territory, and later crossed the border into Lithuania intending to return to Kovidan. Upon arrival, they found the town had not yet recovered from its destruction, and they turned to the Chazon Ish’s siblings (two brothers and a sister) who were living in Vilna to arrange their relocation there. An apartment with two rooms was rented for the couple in the Vilna suburb of Zaretshe, one of which was dedicated to Batya’s fabric shop.

In 1920, the Karelitz family settled in the city of Vilna (then the capital of the short-lived state of Central Lithuania; in 1922 it was annexed by the Second Polish Republic), where he became close to the city’s rabbi, Rabbi Chaim Ozer Grodzinski. According to assessments, his exposure to Vilna’s Torah greats, even though he was not yet central in public affairs, contributed to the leadership ability he would later demonstrate as a Gadol Hador in the Land of Israel after the war.

In the mornings, the Chazon Ish would walk to another suburb called Paplaujos (Paplauja), where his brother-in-law, Rabbi Shmuel Greineman, gave him a room in his apartment, simply furnished with a bed, chair, table, and basic sefarim. In this room, he studied alone, as was his custom, until evening, sometimes until collapse, for a period of three years. It was said that during this time he delved into a specific Mishnah in Tractate Mikvaot for three months, about 15 hours a day. During the 13 years he lived in Vilna, three more volumes of Chazon Ish were published. His brother-in-law Rabbi Greineman and his brother Rabbi Moshe managed their printing.

Binyamin Brown writes that although the Chazon Ish secluded himself for learning, he was “pleasant in manner, very kind, loved people, smiling, optimistic, and even possessed a subtle sense of humor,” and loved to offer advice and help people. He attributes his withdrawal from social interaction to natural shyness.

In 5683 (1923), the second volume of his work on Orach Chayim was published, including his comprehensive treatment of the laws of muktzeh, Kuntres HaMuktzeh. That summer, the Chazon Ish collapsed and was forced to take a break from his intensive study. He wrote to his friend Rabbi Moshe Ilovitzky: “I suffered from nervous weakness and stopped learning.” During that time, Rabbi Yoel Kloft recounted in his name: “Idleness was difficult for me; I felt like I was wandering the streets of Vilna like a madman because I couldn’t study.” After this breakdown, he abandoned his habit of solitary all-day study and began learning with young students as chavruta. In late summer 5683 (1923), he recuperated in the resort town of Valkenik near Vilna, where Rabbi Chaim Ozer Grodzinski also stayed. There he began learning with a young man named Shlomo Cohen, grandson of Rabbi Shlomo HaCohen, one of Vilna’s rabbis. Cohen became his close student and later headed the semi-official biography project of the Chazon Ish. Their joint study continued until the Chazon Ish immigrated to Eretz Yisrael in 5693 (1933), nearly 10 years after their acquaintance began.

Later during his time in Vilna, Chaim Grade, who would become a prominent Yiddish author, also lived in his home. He too studied with the Chazon Ish in chavruta for about seven years. Some speculate that the Chazon Ish preferred to study with young students because he saw them as a substitute for children he never had, or because he preferred to shape their learning style rather than study with those already “corrupted” by standard yeshiva methods.

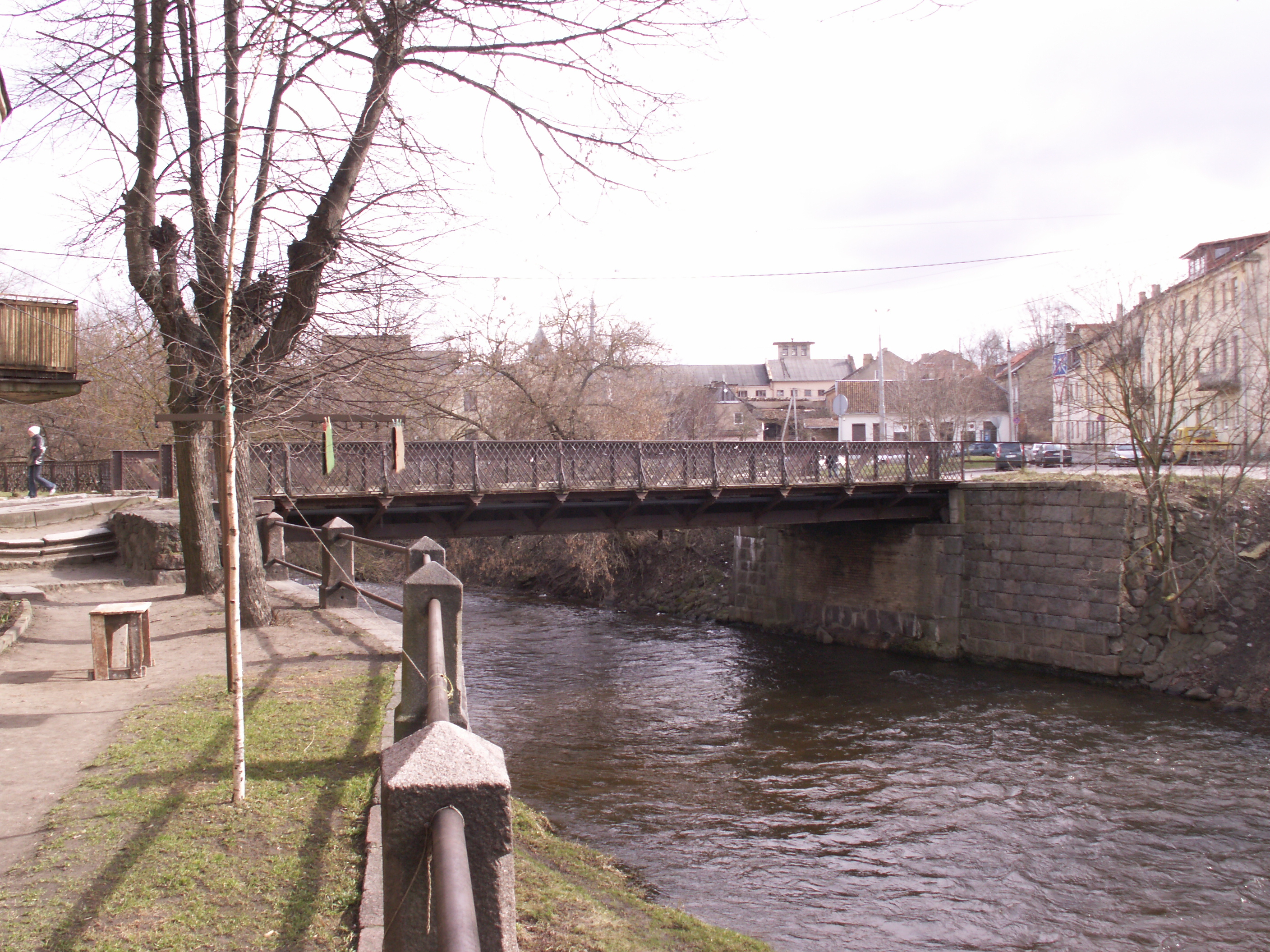
Paplaujos Bridge over the Vilnia River, Vilna, 2008

In Vilna, the Chazon Ish made one final attempt to persuade his wife Batya to accept a get (Jewish divorce), so he could marry a younger woman who could bear children. Batya later recounted this to her friend, the mother of Chaim Kolitz. According to her, it happened on their way home across the Vilnia River (Vilnia); she answered: “Alright, but on my way home from the beit din, I will jump from the bridge straight into the water.” The Chazon Ish ceased all attempts and accepted the situation. However, according to Kolitz’s account, he then practiced the halakhic Niddah restrictions with her, such as not handing objects directly into her hand.

In the 1930s, the Torah monthly Knesset Yisrael was published in Vilna, edited by his brother Rabbi Moshe. The Chazon Ish published insights there under pseudonyms. In one instance, he used the name of his student “Shlomo Cohen” to publish a critique of novellae written by Rabbi Joseph Dov Soloveitchik of Boston (then a student at Humboldt University of Berlin). According to the Chazon Ish’s brother-in-law, Rabbi Yaakov Yisrael Kanievsky (“the Steipler”), the Chazon Ish believed that the novellae were not the young Soloveitchik’s work, but that of his father, Rabbi Moshe Soloveichik, then Rosh yeshiva at Yeshiva University. Nonetheless, he chose to attack them ideologically, due to their association with Religious Zionist and Mizrachi circles. According to Rabbi Soloveitchik’s son, Prof. Haym Soloveitchik, the novellae were indeed his father’s, not his grandfather’s, and the Chazon Ish sought to refute them even with weak arguments “to show that there is no Torah in him or his kind.”

At this stage, the Chazon Ish was involved in several heated public issues, including:

A. The rabbinate controversy in Vilna, a struggle that developed over the spiritual leadership of the city. The Mizrachi faction in Vilna sought to appoint Rabbi Yitzchak Rubinstein, who until then had been the official "government rabbi", as chief rabbi of the city. The Agudat Yisrael faction opposed, claiming that Rabbi Chaim Ozer Grodzinski was the natural spiritual leader of the community. The Chazon Ish led, behind the scenes, the effort to block Rubinstein’s appointment. The campaign failed, and the Chazon Ish’s brother, Rabbi Meir Karelitz, who was openly involved in the effort, was forced to resign from his seat on the “Rabbinical Council” of Vilna.

B. A dispute between the Novardok Yeshiva network and the Vaad HaYeshivot regarding the share of funding to which the network was entitled. The leadership of the network argued that the Vaad should calculate each of the network’s branches as an independent institution when allocating the overall budget. The Vaad, for its part, decided due to financial constraints to treat the network as a single entity. Rabbi Grodzinski, who served as president of the Vaad, recused himself from the matter and imposed upon the Chazon Ish, in the presence of several prominent rabbis from Lithuania and beyond, to issue a ruling. After deliberation, the Chazon Ish was compelled to decide. He heard both sides and ruled that the Novardok Yeshiva network would be entitled to 10% of the Vaad’s total budget. He was unaccustomed to such a position and quickly exited the hall after delivering the ruling. It is told that Rabbi Grodzinski summed up the meeting with the words:

Do you not know who the Chazon Ish is? The Chazon Ish is “truth” – and in the face of truth, one must yield!

In the year 5691 (1931), Rabbi Moshe Blau, at the recommendation of Rabbi Grodzinski, proposed that the Chazon Ish be appointed his deputy and eventual successor to Rabbi Yosef Chaim Sonnenfeld, the leader of the Edah HaChareidis in Jerusalem, who was by then struggling to fulfill his role. The Chazon Ish declined, saying he had no objection to the title, but was unwilling to judge monetary cases – a central part of the proposed position – thereby disqualifying the candidacy. In 5692 (1932), after Rabbi Sonnenfeld's death, Rabbi Grodzinski wrote to Jacob Rosenheim that the Chazon Ish was not among the "fearful of issuing rulings" regarding matters of kashrut laws, but in monetary matters he hesitated to rule “out of great righteousness.”

In his final years in Vilna, he studied in the mornings in chavruta with his acquaintance from Stoybtz, Rabbi Mordechai Shulman, then the young son-in-law of Rabbi Yitzchak Isaac Sher and later head of the Slabodka Yeshiva (Bnei Brak).

In the spring of 5693 (1933), following a theft of merchandise from his wife’s fabric store, the Chazon Ish decided to immigrate to the Land of Israel. He informed Rabbi Grodzinski, who hurried to arrange an immigration certificate for him and his wife. He turned to Moshe Blau, a leader of Agudat Yisrael in Eretz Yisrael, requesting that he handle the matter. Blau hinted that the Chazon Ish’s agreement to serve in the Edah HaChareidis Rabbinate in Jerusalem might ease the certificate process. The Chazon Ish again refused, and the process was handed to the secretary of Agudat Yisrael in Jerusalem, Moshe Porush. Before even receiving the Chazon Ish’s reply, Porush approached the British Mandate authorities, stating that there was a possibility that the Chazon Ish would be appointed head of the rabbinical court of the Edah, and that Agudat Yisrael guaranteed he would not be a public burden. The certificate was quickly arranged and sent to Rabbi Grodzinski. At Rabbi Grodzinski’s special request on behalf of the Chazon Ish, the Jerusalem activists arranged a special exemption for him from the quarantine then in force at ports to prevent disease transmission.

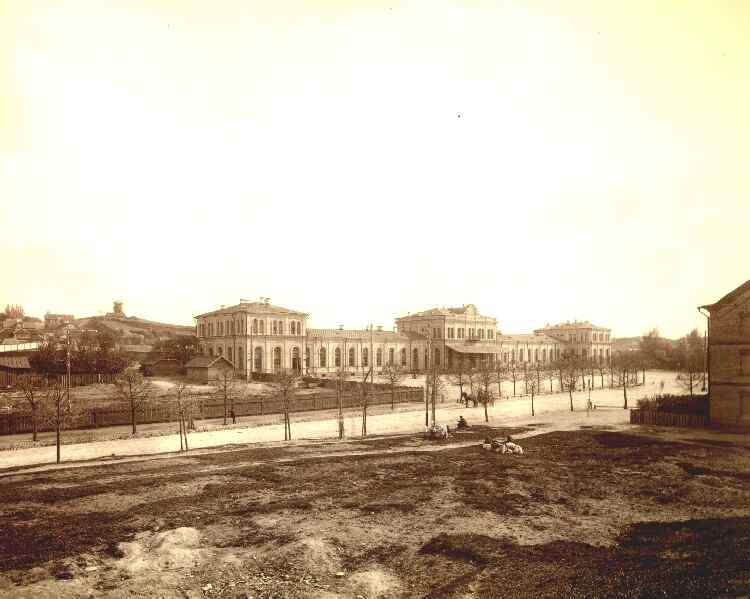
Vilna railway station

The Chazon Ish and his wife left Vilna on Sunday, 8 Tammuz 5693, 2 July 1933. On Saturday night, they were accompanied to the train station by a small group, including Rabbi Chaim Ozer Grodzinski and Rabbi Chanokh Eigesh.

The Karelitz family traveled by train to Warsaw, and from there to the port city of Constanța on the shores of the Black Sea in Romania. From the port of Constanța, they sailed to the Land of Israel aboard the ship USS Martha Washington.

=== In Mandatory Palestine ===
I contemplate... and reflect on that wondrous man... the ideal type of the halachic man, who drew his authority from his intellectual capability and his personality, and not from the position he held. It seems he is one of the only figures about whom it is impossible not to speak in superlatives—and this is indeed what lexicon and encyclopedia writers, usually restrained in tone, do.

— Chaim Be’er, Report from Another World

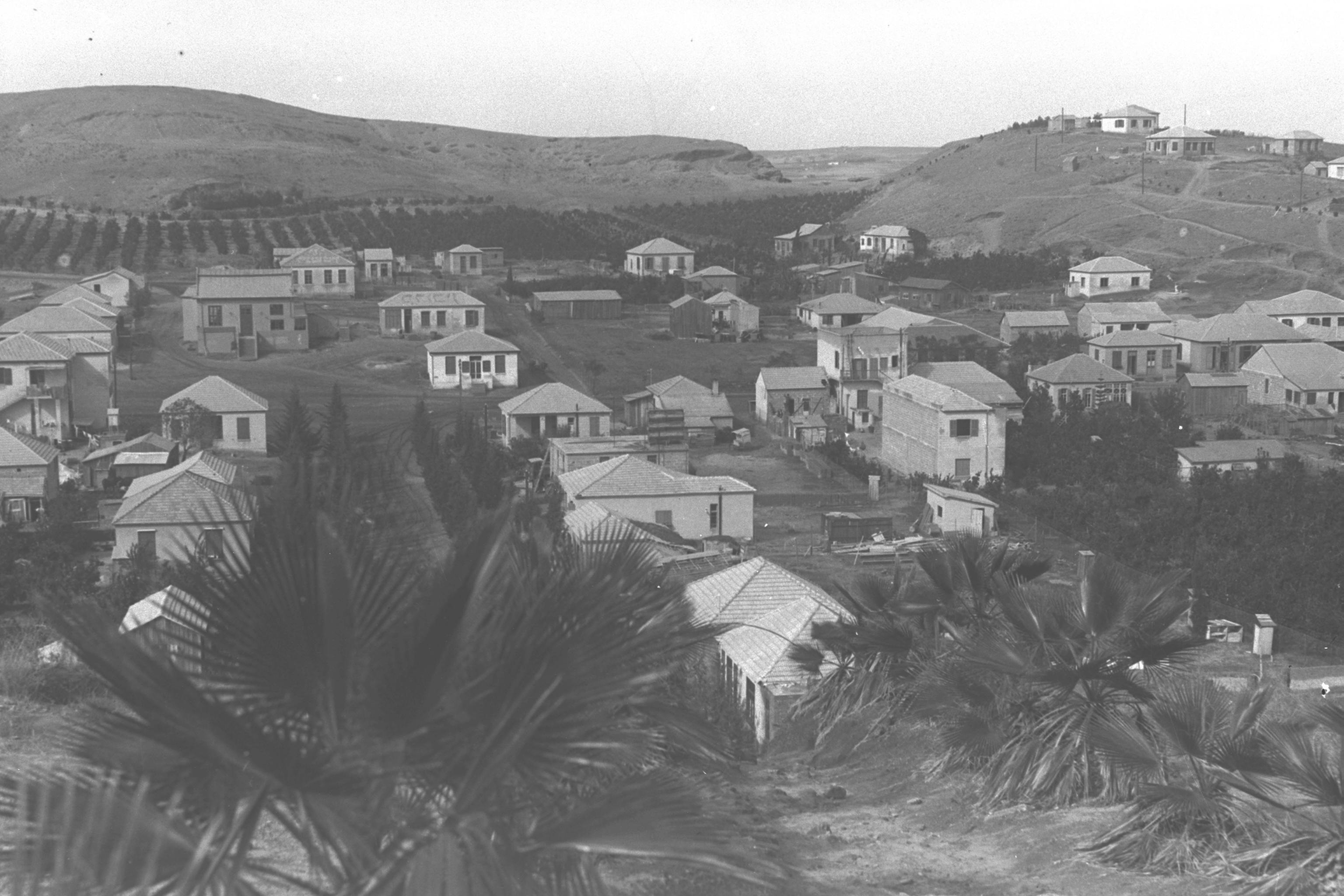
Bnei Brak as it looked in the year the Chazon Ish arrived, 1933

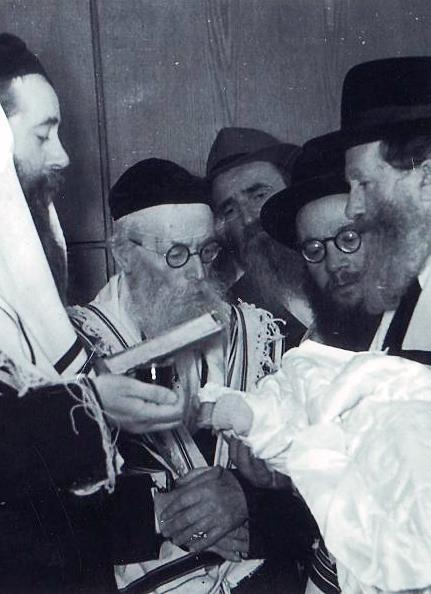
The Chazon Ish serving as sandek at a brit milah, Tel Aviv, late 1940s

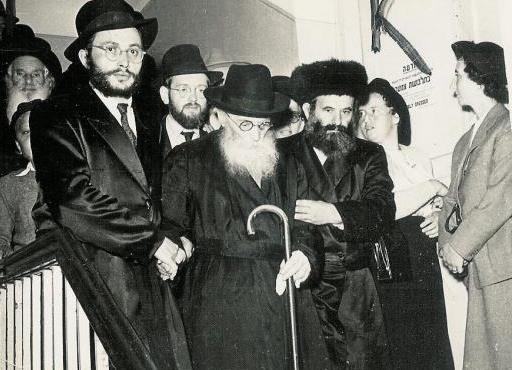
The Chazon Ish, early 1950s

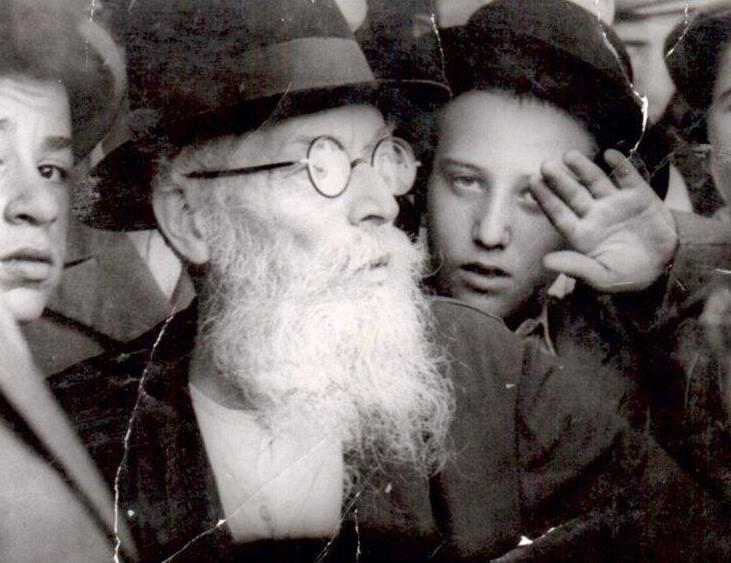
The Chazon Ish, 1952

On 16 Tammuz 5693 (10 July 1933), the Chazon Ish and his wife immigrated to Mandatory Palestine. At the Port of Jaffa, they were greeted by members of Agudat Yisrael, at the request of Rabbi Grodzinski. In their early days in the Land of Israel, they stayed at the home of Rabbi David Potaš in Tel Aviv. After some time, they rented a room on Geula Street in the city. Rabbi Mattityahu Stigl, who had founded Beit Yosef Novardok Yeshiva in the new settlement of Bnei Brak, visited him in his apartment and invited him to move there. The Chazon Ish replied that he would come after the Three Weeks. When the couple eventually arrived, they settled on the hill of Har Shalom. The air there pleased the Chazon Ish, and he decided to settle in the area. Rabbi Shmuel Halevi Wosner related that he told him on the matter:

Jerusalem is full of righteous and great Torah scholars, but in the new settlement I found a wilderness; I wanted to plant seeds of Torah in it—therefore I came to Bnei Brak. If I do not succeed in planting? Then I will go to Gehinnom with its inhabitants like one of them.

At first, he rented a two-room apartment from Rabbi Nachman Shmuel Yaakov Miyodser, rabbi of Bnei Brak and later head of the settlement council. After a short time, he moved to another apartment in Givat Rokach, where the rent was cheaper. Near his home was the Beit Yosef Yeshiva, and from time to time, the Chazon Ish would deliver lessons to its students. A few years later, he moved into a house built for him in eastern Bnei Brak. In this house also lived his sister Miriam and her husband, Rabbi Yaakov Yisrael Kanievsky.

Bnei Brak later became, to a large extent due to the Chazon Ish, one of the strongholds of Haredi Judaism in Israel. At first, he was joined in Bnei Brak by a small circle of members of Poalei Agudat Yisrael, who followed his halachic guidance on agricultural matters, mainly after Rabbi Chaim Ozer Grodzinski referred them to him. Later, he became widely known and became a halachic authority among broader circles in the country.

An attempt by Batya Karelitz to reopen a textile shop failed, and she had to close it. A wealthy man who offered monthly financial support, at the request of Rabbi Yechezkel Abramsky, was declined by the Chazon Ish, who resolved to support himself through the sale of his books, even though this income was neither profitable nor steady; the Chazon Ish had not yet achieved national fame, and buyers came only gradually.

In 5694 (1934), Rabbi Grodzinski put forward the Chazon Ish as one of the candidates for the Council of Torah Sages of Agudat Yisrael in the Land of Israel. After consulting with the Chazon Ish, Rabbi Grodzinski wrote:

Rabbi A.Y. Karelitz does not want to accept any official title or responsibility, but is willing to be consulted.

That summer, the Chazon Ish spent an extended period in Safed for health reasons. During that time, he primarily studied in the Beit Midrash of Rabbi Yosef Karo in the Old City.

In 5696 (1936), he worked to establish the “Torah Education Center in the Land of Israel,” and he founded a kollel in the Zikhron Meir neighborhood in Bnei Brak. This kollel, one of the first in the New Yishuv, became a model for many other institutions. After his death, the institution was named "Kollel Chazon Ish".

In December 1936 (winter 5697), the Chazon Ish fell ill, apparently due to appendicitis, and required removal of the appendix (appendectomy). Later that year, ahead of the upcoming Shmita year 5698 (1937–38), his brother-in-law Rabbi Shmuel Greineman printed for the first time in Jerusalem his book "Chazon Ish" on Tractate Shevi'it and the laws of shmita.

In the following years, several more volumes in the series were published, especially from Seder Taharot, which scholars had previously studied little due to the lack of both Babylonian Talmud and Jerusalem Talmud on it.

At the beginning of winter 5701, on 19 Cheshvan, his mother Rashe Leah died in Jerusalem. In her final years she had lived with her son Rabbi Meir Karelitz and was buried on the Mount of Olives. The Chazon Ish ascended to Jerusalem for the second time in his life; the first had been a year earlier, for the wedding of Shlomo Shimshon Karelitz, son of his older brother Rabbi Meir.

After the deaths of the great rabbis of Eastern European Judaism, some of whom perished in the Holocaust, many saw him as their successor. During this time, his status as Gadol Hador began to take shape.

In the years prior to the founding of the State, the Chazon Ish was involved in several public issues, most with a religious background. He helped establish new yeshivot following the destruction of European Jewry and its yeshivot, encouraged both ideologically and financially farmers who kept Shmita, and wrote letters requesting financial aid for Haredi educational institutions that were in crisis (1947).

==== Shmita and Heter Mechira ====
When the Chazon Ish arrived in the Land of Israel, nearly all farmers (except a few in the Petah Tikva area) relied during the Sabbatical year on the Heter Mechira. He worked to change this situation. In 5698, when the treasurer of the Haredi settlement of Machane Yisrael (Jezreel Valley) came to consult with him on the matter, the Chazon Ish ruled that they should refrain from relying on the heter. In accordance with his ruling, Kibbutz Hafetz Haim and other settlements of Poalei Agudat Yisrael also acted.

To enable farmers to keep shmita without heter mechira, the Chazon Ish permitted certain labors aimed at preserving the fruit ("le-okmei peira"), and allowed marketing the produce via Otzer Beit Din.

==== The international date line controversy ====
During World War II, when students of the Mir Yeshiva and others fled to East Asia, the "Shabbat controversy in Japan" arose, in which many halachic authorities debated the question of determining which day the Shabbat and festivals fall on in that region of the globe. On the eve of Yom Kippur 5702 (early October 1941), the issue intensified among the Jewish refugees in Japan. Until then, those who wished to be stringent avoided a decision by observing two consecutive days as Shabbat. However, a two-day fast was not a viable solution for most of the refugees, especially under wartime living conditions. The exiles sent telegrams to rabbis in the Land of Israel and elsewhere, asking how to proceed.

The Chazon Ish, who had already dealt with this issue in the past, was also asked about the matter, and his response was published in a well-known halachic ruling, which opposed the view of Jerusalem’s rabbis and rabbis affiliated with the Chief Rabbinate. According to his ruling, the Halachic date line passes west of Japan, and therefore Shabbat there falls on Sunday, contrary to the practice of the local Jewish community.

The Chazon Ish dictated his position on the date line to his student Rabbi Kalman Kahana on the night of Yom Kippur eve. On the morning of Yom Kippur eve, he sent Rabbi Kalman Kahana to Jerusalem to Rabbi Yitzchok Zev Soloveitchik to request that the two of them send a telegram to Japan instructing people to eat on Wednesday (according to their reckoning) and to fast on Thursday.

The Brisker Rav refused to send the telegram, arguing that it would arrive in Japan after Wednesday evening and some people would surely have already accepted the fast of Yom Kippur and would not want to interrupt it; seeing the telegram, they might fast again on Thursday and thus endanger themselves. He also added that the Av Beit Din of Brisk, Rabbi Simcha Zelig Riger, had already ruled, before their departure, that they should fast on Thursday.

Even before Rabbi Kalman Kahana returned from Jerusalem to Bnei Brak, the Chazon Ish sent a telegram to Japan instructing: "Eat on Wednesday and fast Yom Kippur on Thursday, and do not be concerned about anything."

Rabbi Yechezkel Levenstein, who was the spiritual authority among the Mir Yeshiva students at the time, ruled to follow the Chazon Ish’s opinion even against the majority of dissenters.

This position was printed in Kuntres Shemoneh Esreh Sha’ot (“Pamphlet of Eighteen Hours”), initially as a separate booklet, and later included in his book on Orach Chayim.

==== The holocaust and his attitude toward it ====
During the Holocaust, the rabbi did not imagine the extent of the disaster and refused to believe the reports arriving about the extermination of millions of Jews. Eventually, when the scope of the destruction became known, the rabbi lamented: "From Heaven, the calamity that befell the Jews of Europe was concealed from us—even prayer efforts to annul the harsh decree were lacking."

Various reports circulated regarding his statements on the cause of the Holocaust, including: that it could not be explained, that it was a punishment for the sins of the generation and its secular leaders, or that it was due to the weakness of the generation after the deaths of previous Gedolei Yisrael. He also claimed that despite everything, God's punishment was given with abundant mercy. Aharon Surasky reports that he likened the period to the work of tailoring, in which the tailor must "cut the fabric into shreds… in preparation for sewing a new garment"—destruction as a precursor to creation. In light of all this, it seems he avoided providing a structured and systematic theological doctrine.

Before the establishment of the state, a proposal was made to institute a perpetual public fast day and a collective shiv'ah. The rabbi responded with a lengthy letter opposing additions to what the Sages already instituted, especially in a generation he viewed as spiritually diminished. He did not see the Holocaust as an exceptionally unique catastrophe compared to the disasters that befell the Jewish people throughout history. Binyamin Brown assesses that this response also reflects hidden anxieties about accusations toward the Haredi world, which was surprised and unprepared for the devastation.

Blaming the rabbis for the destruction of European Jewry was, in his view, heresy—even if said by someone otherwise observant.

==== The establishment of the state of Israel and his attitude toward it ====
The rabbi instructed R’ Jacob Rosenheim, president of Agudat Yisrael Worldwide, to prevent the establishment of a Jewish state as much as possible. Even after the state became a reality, he expressed reservation and hostility toward its ruling institutions and did not believe the state would last long.

Upon the establishment of the State of Israel, he supported Agudat Yisrael's participation in the United Religious Front for the elections to the Knesset, in contrast to the position of the Edah HaChareidis. He explained that such participation did not imply recognition of the state and likened it to a man facing a robber and reaching an agreement with him to avoid being killed; this is not recognition of “authority” but an acknowledgment of reality.

He opposed Zionism and Religious Zionism, and insisted that Tachanun be recited in his study hall on Yom HaAtzmaut. In one case where he was sandek on that day, he publicly announced it to prevent misunderstanding. Two years later, he ruled that even when a brit was held in his study hall, Tachanun should be said—so no one would mistakenly think it was omitted due to Yom HaAtzmaut.

After the 1948 Arab-Israeli War, he addressed the halachic implications of its outcomes. In his book on Tractate Sanhedrin, he discusses regarding the olives taken from Arab trees that they abandoned and [then] left, and regarding the question of Arab land ownership in the Land of Israel, he proposed that since all foreign ownership in the Land of Israel after the exile derives its legal validity from the laws of "kinyan kibush", which halachically regulate a conqueror’s ownership of captured land, then when a new conqueror (Israel) arrives, the previous ownership expires on its own. This has important halachic implications for the obligation of terumot and ma’aserot on agricultural produce from captured territories.

==== National service law affair ====
In 1952, the issue of the conscription of religious women into national service arose. In the background of the controversy was an attempt to obligate women to serve military service, an obligation that even the vast majority of the Religious Zionist public opposed. Subsequently, due to this opposition, a clause was established in the law exempting women from military service for religious reasons, and in a second stage, an attempt was made to determine a national service alternative for women within the framework of the Security Service Law. The Chief Rabbinate and Haredi rabbis and others strongly opposed this, contrary to the position of the Religious Kibbutz Movement and the “Lamifneh” faction in HaPoel HaMizrachi, who supported the law. This issue was considered very essential in the eyes of the Chazon Ish. He wrote on the matter: “The stirring of my soul instructs and comes forth that it is a matter of ‘be killed and not transgress’, and perhaps also from the point of halacha it is so.”

In this context, "Agudat Yisrael" left the coalition at the end of 1952. Eventually, in 1953, the "National Service Law" was legislated, stipulating that any religious woman who received exemption from military service in Israel is obligated to national service. This law was passed with the agreement of the Chief Rabbinate and the support of the Mafdal representatives. Shlomo Zalman Shragai wrote that Minister Haim-Moshe Shapira and Deputy Minister Zerach Warhaftig received the Chazon Ish’s principled consent to their step. However, due to the opposition, the law was not implemented in practice.

==== His death ====
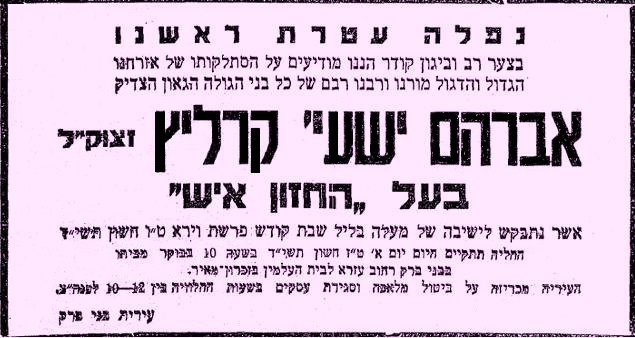
Condolence notice by the Municipality of Bnei Brak

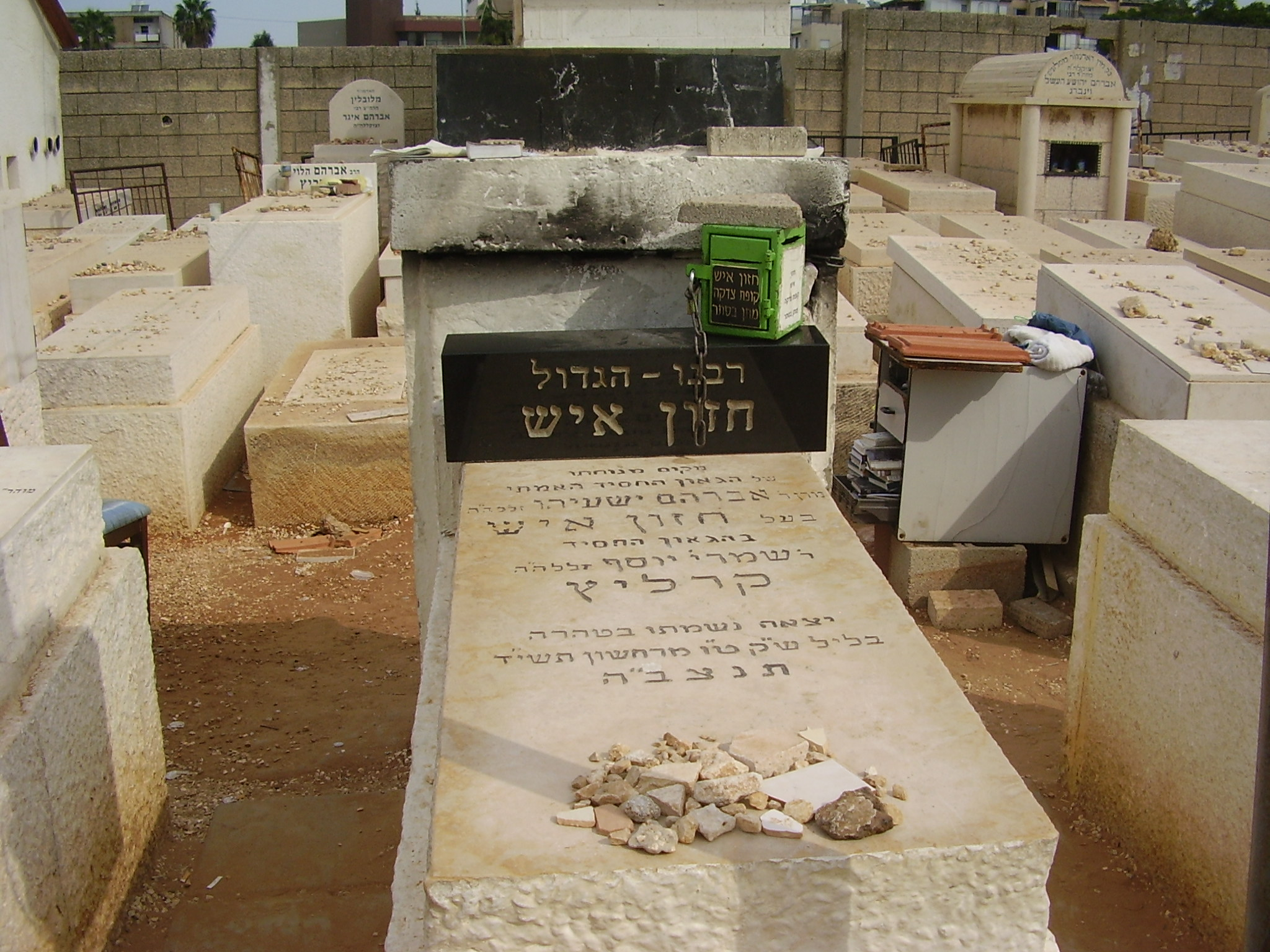
Karelitz's grave in the Shomrei Shabbat Cemetery, Bnei Brak

Karelitz died of a heart attack on Saturday morning, the 15th of Cheshvan 5714, October 24, 1953, at 2:30 AM. The municipalities of Bnei Brak and Ramat Gan declared a suspension of work during the funeral hours. At the opening of the government meeting on Sunday morning, Prime Minister Ben-Gurion delivered remarks in his memory.

At the funeral procession on Sunday afternoon tens of thousands of men, women, and children walked behind his bier. He was buried in the Shomrei Shabbat Cemetery in Bnei Brak.

After his death a charity fund was established in his name .

== His thought and work ==
=== Halakha ===
==== His method of study, and his attitude toward the rulings of his predecessors ====
A central element in the teaching and halakhic rulings of the Chazon Ish was his attitude toward “dina degemara” — laws explicated in the Talmud — as those that may not be questioned, must not be deviated from even in the slightest, and must be fulfilled even if they were not mentioned by later halakhic authorities after the sealing of the Talmud: “A law that is clarified explicitly from the Gemara is, to me, the foundation of halakhic decision.”

Even in some cases where the reality from which the Talmudic law was derived had changed over the generations, the Chazon Ish maintained that the law remained in force. His reason was that halakha for future generations was meant to be sealed according to the words of the sages of the “two thousand years of Torah,” which ended in the time of Chazal. Thus he wrote about the laws of terefot (non-kosher animals): “And behold, it was necessary that during the two thousand years of Torah, as it says in Avodah Zarah 9a and Bava Metzia 86a — Rabbi and R. Natan are the end of the Mishnah, Rav Ashi and Ravina are the end of the hora’ah — there should be a fixed determination of terefot. There is no new Torah after them. The terefot were determined by Divine Providence at that time, and even if medicine later develops cures for these conditions, they remain the terefot that the Torah forbade, both then and in future generations.”

He said in a letter: “To take hold of the rope of Torah is a difficult matter, and manifold. I took upon myself to investigate the Gemara as much as possible, even if it contradicts the Rishonim — and to suffice with the knowledge that the words of our sages are fundamental, and we are ‘orphans of orphans.’ Nevertheless, not to refrain from clarifying and analyzing what we can in our smallness, and also to rule accordingly in cases where there is no explicit contrary ruling in halakha. Otherwise, I would lack the engagement of Torah.”

In one of his letters, he placed the Gra in a row alongside Moses, Ezra the Scribe, Rabbi Yehuda HaNasi, Rav Ashi, and the Rambam: “We relate to the Gra in the same category as Moshe Rabbeinu, Ezra, Rabbeinu HaKadosh, Rav Ashi, the Rambam, and the Gra, through whom Torah was revealed as one sanctified for that purpose, who illuminated that which had not been illuminated before him and took his portion. He is counted as one of the Rishonim, and therefore disagrees with them in many places with great strength — even with the Rif and the Rambam. His stature in divine spirit, piety, wisdom, diligence, and mastery of the entire Torah cannot be fathomed. Therefore it is not surprising that he disagrees with the Shulchan Aruch — and the places where he does so are many.”

Despite this, and according to his principle that one must “investigate the Gemara as much as possible, even if it contradicts the Rishonim,” he himself was eventually forced to interpret sugyot differently even from the revered Gra. Rabbi Shlomo Cohen recounted that in 1920, when the Chazon Ish was 41, he said that throughout his life he had tried to avoid disagreeing with the Gra, but had finally been compelled to interpret one grave sugya differently.

A representative example of his approach — “to interpret and clarify what we can... and also to rule accordingly when there is no explicit contrary view” — that also highlights his social sensitivity, can be found in the case of an agunah that was brought before his nephew, Rabbi Shlomo Shimon Karelitz, head of the rabbinical court in Petah Tikva. The nephew struggled to find a solution to the dire situation and turned to his uncle. The Chazon Ish delved into the relevant sugyot and ruled leniently in that specific case. The judges accepted his opinion and signed a marriage permit for the woman. The nephew, still uneasy with the ruling, came to him the next morning and reiterated his strong objections. Under those circumstances, he argued, how could they allow it? The Chazon Ish reconsidered his arguments and then replied: “It is true that it is difficult to permit — but it is more difficult to forbid!”

==== Precision in Halakha ====
“The Lithuanian genius, whose greatness at first glance is expressed in his intellectual achievements, [but in truth is revealed] as a great and multifaceted personality, full of imagination, emotion, and soul"

One of the banners of the "Chazon Ish" worldview is the matter of meticulous adherence to the minutest detail in fulfilling halakha in all its details and refinements. The Chazon Ish viewed this exacting behavior as a guarantee of Yirat Shamayim (fear of Heaven) and dedicated to it the third section of his philosophical work "Emunah uVitachon", titled "Ethics and Halakha." His great independence as a halakhic authority led him to extreme precision even in the details of laws he deduced from halakhic discussion in the relevant Talmudic sugyot. These refinements became identified with him and his students. Most well-known are his stringencies, dating back to his time in Europe, especially in the following areas:

The laws of Eruvin:

Writing Torah scrolls, tefillin, and mezuzot – with special emphasis on the shape of the letters according to the ruling of the Beit Yosef. According to his approach, which contradicts the custom of the Ari, the right “leg” of the letter tzadi should be shaped like a regular yud (as in contemporary Hebrew fonts), not an inverted yud, as is customary among Sephardic and Hasidic Jews;

The Four Species – into which he invested much money and effort to obtain them in their optimal halakhic form. It is told that once, in midsummer, he saw beautiful myrtle branches that met halakhic standards in a local non-Jew’s garden. He paid the man in advance to guard and care for them until Sukkot to add them to his lulav;

Laws of mikvaot: the infusion of drawn water into rainwater (zeriah) to render it a valid mikveh – the Chazon Ish had his own unique position on this matter.

Mitzvot between man and his fellow were also, in his view, included in halakhic precision, and he was very careful that one not come at the expense of the other. His close associate Rabbi Shlomo Cohen related that once the Chazon Ish instructed him not to say the usual verses before the shofar blowing but to blow without delay and finish prayers quickly. The reason for the haste became clear after prayers: the Chazon Ish had overheard a weak elderly man tell his son, who urged him to eat for health reasons: "No, I have never eaten before the shofar blowing." So that he would not be forced to prolong his fast, the Chazon Ish shortened the traditional ritual.

The Chazon Ish instituted the reading of Megillat Esther in Bnei Brak also on Shushan Purim, out of doubt that the city might be considered "adjacent and visible" to the ancient city of Jaffa.

Etrogim of the “Chazon Ish” strain:

A well-known case of the Chazon Ish’s halakhic stringency was his search for a native Israeli etrog variety that grew wild, to avoid the suspicion that etrogim might be grafted with another botanical species, which would render the etrog halakhically invalid for the Four Species. The etrog tree is prone to grafting due to its weakness. The etrogim he found were slightly lacking in aesthetic beauty and symmetry. In the Haredi public, his approach was widely accepted, and there is high demand for etrogim descended from trees whose fruits the Chazon Ish used. His method for identifying the ancient Israeli etrog was accepted by several researchers.

==== The issue of halakhic measurements ====
The name of the Chazon Ish is also associated with a fundamental disagreement on the issue of "shiurim" (halakhic measures) mentioned in the Bible and the Talmud (cubit, span, fingerbreadth, olive-size, egg-size, etc.). Rabbi Avraham Chaim Naeh (the GaRa"Ch Naeh) published these measures in modern units (meters and grams), and according to his approach, a handbreadth is eight centimeters and a revi'it (liquid measure) is 86 cc. The Chazon Ish disagreed with this view, and claimed that the true measures are much greater — a handbreadth is about ten centimeters, and a revi'it is approximately 150 cc.

The main point of disagreement is whether to base the other measures on the volume of eggs or on the width of the thumb. Rabbis Naeh and Karelitz were not the first to differ on this point, they were preceded by great Acharonim, the Chatam Sofer and the Noda BiYehuda. Rabbi Naeh sought to preserve the custom of the Old Yishuv in Jerusalem, while the Chazon Ish held that the tradition he had received from his father’s home and the greats of Lithuania regarding measurements was accepted by Torah scholars with higher halakhic authority than that of popular custom. As part of this approach, the Chazon Ish relied on the measurement of the finger of his student Rabbi Kalman Kahana, whom he considered an average person for the purpose of measures and sizes.

In practice, in the Lithuanian sector, the Chazon Ish’s method on this issue is the widespread norm. The spread of this practice began among graduates of Lithuanian yeshivas and from there extended to the broader sector. Even among the rest of the Haredi public, who follow their ancestral tradition with the smaller measure, some are stringent in Torah-level commandments according to the larger measurement due to concern for the opinions of the Chatam Sofer and the Chazon Ish, as recommended by the Mishnah Berurah.

==== The philosophy of halakha ====
The Chazon Ish held that, beyond the essential obligation on every Jew to obey the Torah's directives as they are, their goal is to place a person in the position of a subject standing before his king and submitting to his authority. For this purpose, what is required on one hand is absolute submission and obedience to every detail; and on the other hand, the performance of mitzvot under all circumstances — even when it is clear to a person that he cannot precisely assess what is required of him for the full performance of the mitzvah. This is because the main thing is fulfilling the king’s command, and man’s limitations and assessments were taken into account with the command. Or in the words of the Chazon Ish: "The halakha was given to be calculated approximately, for the mitzvot were given only to purify the creatures, and to be precise in His commandments [i.e., God’s] to accept His sovereignty, and also to fulfill the wisdom of the Torah contained in all the laws of the commandment and its inner secret. And for all of these, nothing is lost if the fixing of boundary lines is approximate, so that even those of weak understanding can fulfill the practical commandments."

=== His influence on the Haredi public ===
The Chazon Ish had a decisive contribution to shaping Judaism in the post-Holocaust generation. His contribution is directly reflected in the way the Haredi public conducts itself. He reinforced the sense of the importance of Torah study for the entirety of a person's life as an ideal, and is credited to some extent with the creation of a "society of learners" in Israel. As someone who was the “Gadol HaDor” (leading Torah sage of the generation) at the time of the post-war turning point, most of the yeshivas established during this period in the Land of Israel were founded with his blessing and advice—both regarding the very establishment of the yeshiva, and regarding the choice of location and staff; among them: Kfar Hasidim Yeshiva in Zikhron Ya'akov, the Sharon Yeshiva in Ramat HaSharon, and the Be'er Yaakov Yeshiva. For this reason, Haredi biographers attribute to him the title "Father of the Yeshivas in the Land of Israel." Binyamin Brown, in a response article, claims this argument is flawed; according to him it is pure anachronism, as other rabbis of the time are also absent from the Haredi press.

=== His attitude toward Rav Kook ===
The attitude of the Chazon Ish toward the Chief Rabbi of Israel at the time of his arrival in the Land of Israel, Rabbi Abraham Isaac Kook, occupied thinkers from the Religious Zionist public in the final decades of the 20th century and the early decades of the 21st, and subsequently also Haredi elements who criticize Rav Kook's path. Some see the official Haredi position, which expresses varying degrees of reservation toward Rav Kook’s path, as a rewriting of the true and respectful opinion of the Chazon Ish, as expressed in his letters to Rav Kook and other sources.

Shortly after his immigration to Israel, the Chazon Ish addressed two short letters to Rav Kook containing halachic questions on laws applicable in the Land of Israel but not in the Diaspora. In these letters he addressed Rav Kook with the title “His Honor, the esteemed Maran, may he live and be well,” a title he only used for Rabbis Isser Zalman Meltzer, Chaim Ozer Grodzinski, Yitzchok Zev Soloveitchik, and Elchonon Wasserman. Rabbi Menachem Yehuda Halevi Ushpizai testified that when he informed the Chazon Ish of Rav Kook’s grave illness, tears came to his eyes, and he sent a message that he intended to visit him. However, Rav Kook told the messenger he did not want to interrupt the Chazon Ish’s Torah study and that he should pray for him at home.

The first mayor of Bnei Brak, Yitzhak Gerstenkorn, relates in his memoirs that when Rav Kook arrived in Bnei Brak, he sent word that he wished to visit the Chazon Ish. The Chazon Ish replied that he would not allow Rav Kook to trouble himself and that he would come to him. For the meeting, the Chazon Ish wore his Shabbat clothes. At the cornerstone laying for Yeshivat Beit Yosef in Bnei Brak, the Chazon Ish stood throughout Rav Kook’s congratulatory speech—an honor he did not show to other Torah scholars who spoke there. When asked why he didn’t sit, he replied: “The Torah is standing!” D The subject became a controversy between Religious Zionists and Haredim, and treatises have been written on both sides. Binyamin Brown offers a developmental view of the Chazon Ish’s attitude toward Rav Kook: a warm relationship that deteriorated over time

=== His attitude toward the Mussar movement ===
The Chazon Ish expressed a critical view toward the ideas of the Musar movement, though he held affection for its figures. He expressed this in a letter to the head of Hebron Yeshiva, Rabbi Simcha Zissel Broide, while still a young man: “I spent much time with the Saba of Slabodka z”l, and with the Saba of Mir z”l, and with their great students, and also with the greats of the Novardok school, and there was always boundless love between us. They were entirely devoted to me, and I never refrained from voicing sharp critique, and they delighted in it. For it is the nature of scholars to delight more in a 'meitivay' (a challenging question in the Talmud) than in a 'tena nami hachi' (a supporting text); and I delighted in them, especially the yeshivas rooted in Torah and awe of Heaven, without separation...”

Unlike early 19th-century opponents of the Mussar Movement, who accused its leaders of ideological affinity with the Jewish Enlightenment, the Chazon Ish, writing in the early 20th century, did not doubt their intentions. However, he believed the movement’s claim—that refined character traits alone can equip a person to overcome natural inclinations and align with halacha—was flawed. In his view, in moments of crisis or value conflict, one reverts to natural instincts: “When he is confronted by conflict with his fellow, he will surely decide in line with his natural tendencies. Even if these are refined, they often do not align with the divine halacha.”

Moreover, refined character traits and self-awareness might cause one who places his trust in Mussar study to rely on the power of his intellect, even in cases of error. Therefore, the Chazon Ish believed that a proper ethical system cannot be based on anything other than halacha itself: absolute commitment to the minutiae of the law. This commitment operates on two levels: first, a person’s day is filled with small tests to fulfill or neglect the law—tests that are easy to overcome and strengthen religious awareness; second, in cases requiring special effort, precision in law trains one to overcome "bad" traits like laziness and desire.

=== His attitude toward the Hasidic movement ===
The Chazon Ish did not explicitly address the Hasidic movement in writing. There are a number of passages in Emunah u’Bitachon that may have been aimed against Hasidism. He opposed some customs practiced among Hasidim, such as writing the inverted tzadi in STaM and immersion in the mikveh on Shabbat, while praising others such as growing a beard, wearing a long coat, and marrying young. He encouraged Hasidim to travel to their Rebbe for Shabbat, but prevented young men from attending a Hasidic tish on Friday night, claiming that "on Friday night there is a lack of Torah in the world." Biographies of his persona include testimonies that he ideologically opposed the Hasidic path, following his great admiration for the Vilna Gaon and his way. Nevertheless, this view was not expressed in practice, because "today we have enough battles from outside." He maintained friendly relations with Rebbes of his generation, and encouraged his close associates from Hasidic families to continue in their practice.

=== On history and hagiography ===
The Chazon Ish believed that studying the conduct of great sages is a practical necessity, and only by truly knowing and recognizing their character can one learn from their actions. There is no value in a stereotyped perception of all sages as a uniform brand of a certain kind of perfection. He gave expression to this view in his famous letter, which also contains a halakhic reference to the possible problem of such study due to the prohibition of lashon hara: “If it is permitted to speak lashon hara about a craftsman in his craft, to someone inquiring for practical need, then all the more so it is permitted to inform those who hold fast to the Torah and need to know. For knowing the sages of the generation, their heart and measure, is itself Torah. Nonetheless, great caution is required, lest one misstate the matter by even a hair’s breadth and thereby bring out a bad name on a Torah scholar.

Nevertheless, the Chazon Ish expressed significant skepticism regarding the events of the times as described in books of history and biographies. In his view, they mix truth and falsehood side by side, and historical written information should not be relied upon without a probabilistic examination of the events described. He attributed this to the innovating tendency of historians and their uncritical reliance on earlier ones: “Chronicles and world events teach much to the wise man in his path, and the foundations of wisdom are laid upon the history of the past. Yet because man loves to innovate and to speak before an audience, many lies have accumulated in historical books. For man is not naturally repulsed by falsehood; many love it and delight in it with the pleasure of friendship. And the wise man must sift through the storytellers’ tales, to accept the truth and discard the lies. Here lies broad ground for imagination, for imagination by nature hurries to judge before reason has weighed the matter on the scales of justice. And imagination passes judgment instantly—what is true and what is false.

== Commemoration ==
The neighborhood of Beit Hazon, located in Kfar Haroeh, is named after the Chazon Ish. The neighborhood was established by immigrants from England, the United States, and South Africa. In addition, the Hazon Ish neighborhood (Shkhunat Hazon Ish) in Bnei Brak is also named after him, where several of his prominent disciples reside. At the center of the neighborhood stands the Lederman Synagogue of the disciples of the Chazon Ish, originally named after him, "Hazon Ish Synagogue"; the synagogue's customs were established according to his rulings.

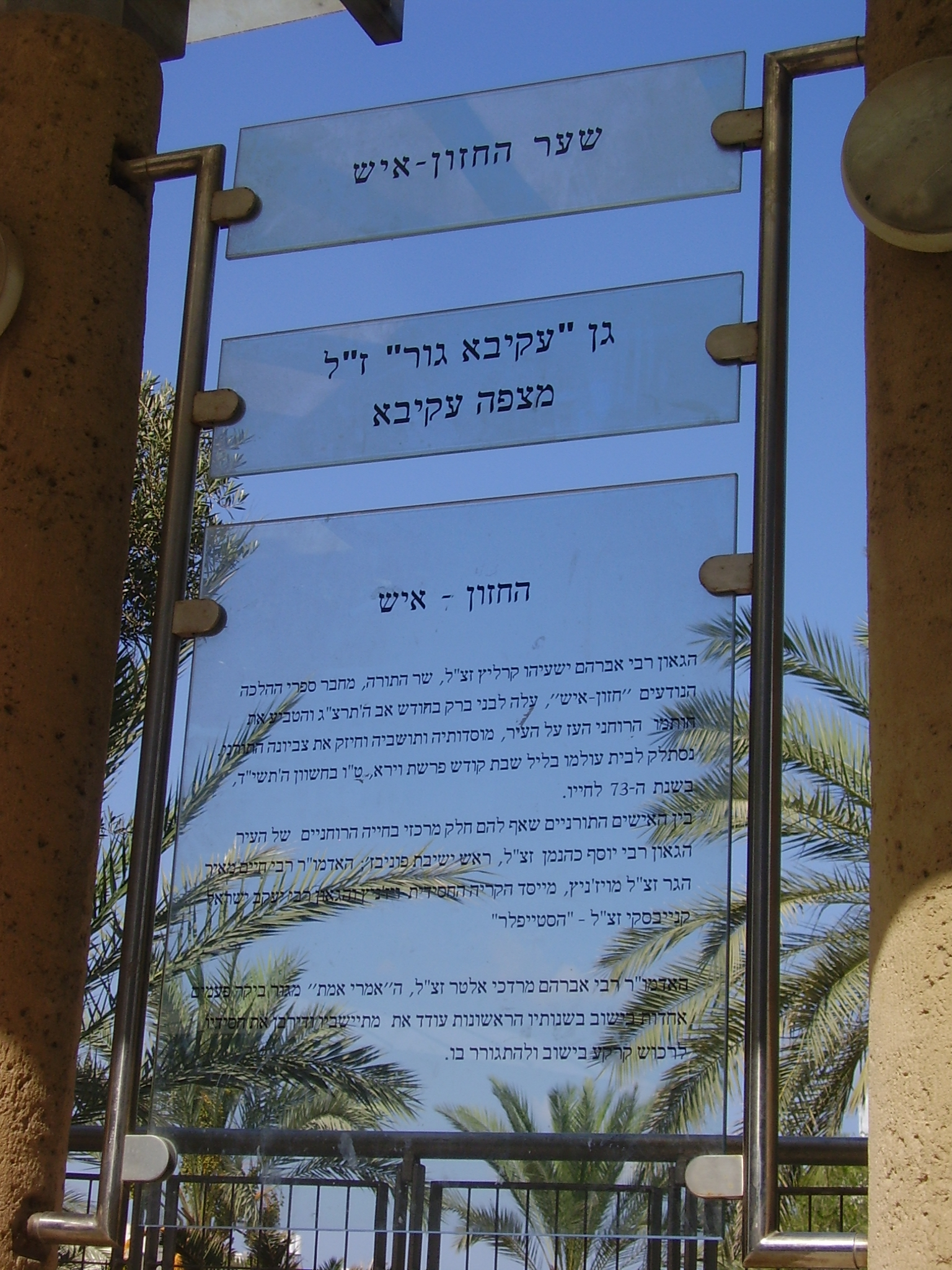
Hazon Ish gate in Akiva Gur garden in Bnei Brak

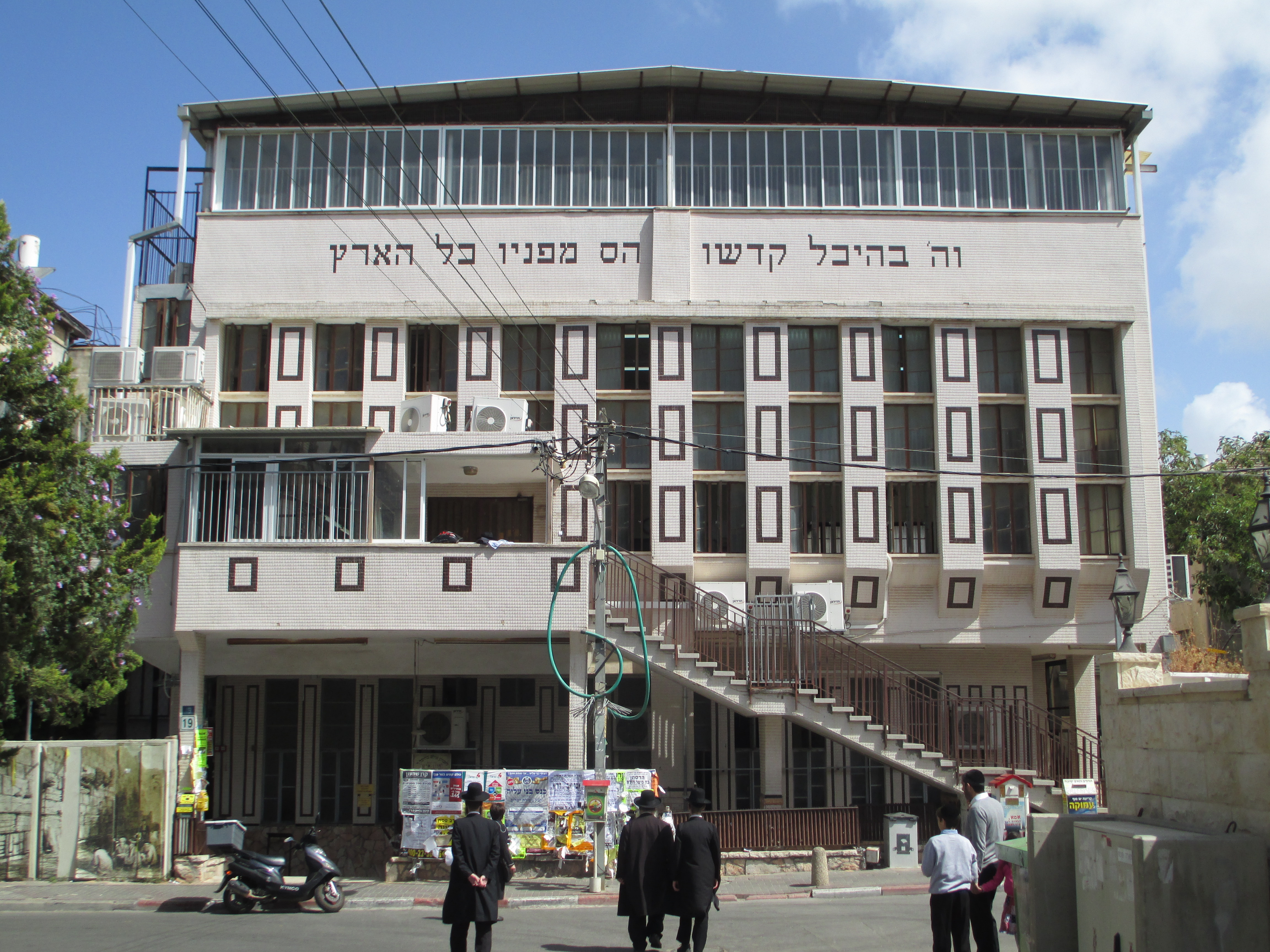
"Hazon Ish" Synagogue named after Lederman in Bnei Brak

In 18 cities in Israel, streets are named after him. In Be'er Ya'akov, Beit Shemesh, Beitar Illit, Bnei Brak—where a central street is named after him on which he lived—Zichron Yaakov, Hadera in Giv'at Olga, Tiberias, and also in Jerusalem in the Ramat Shlomo neighborhood, Modi'in Illit, Netivot,Petah Tikva, Kiryat Sefer, Rehovot, Rishon LeZion, Ra'anana, Rosh HaAyin, Ramat Gan. In the past, a street was also named after him in Tel Aviv, on historic Irshid Street in the Manshiya neighborhood.

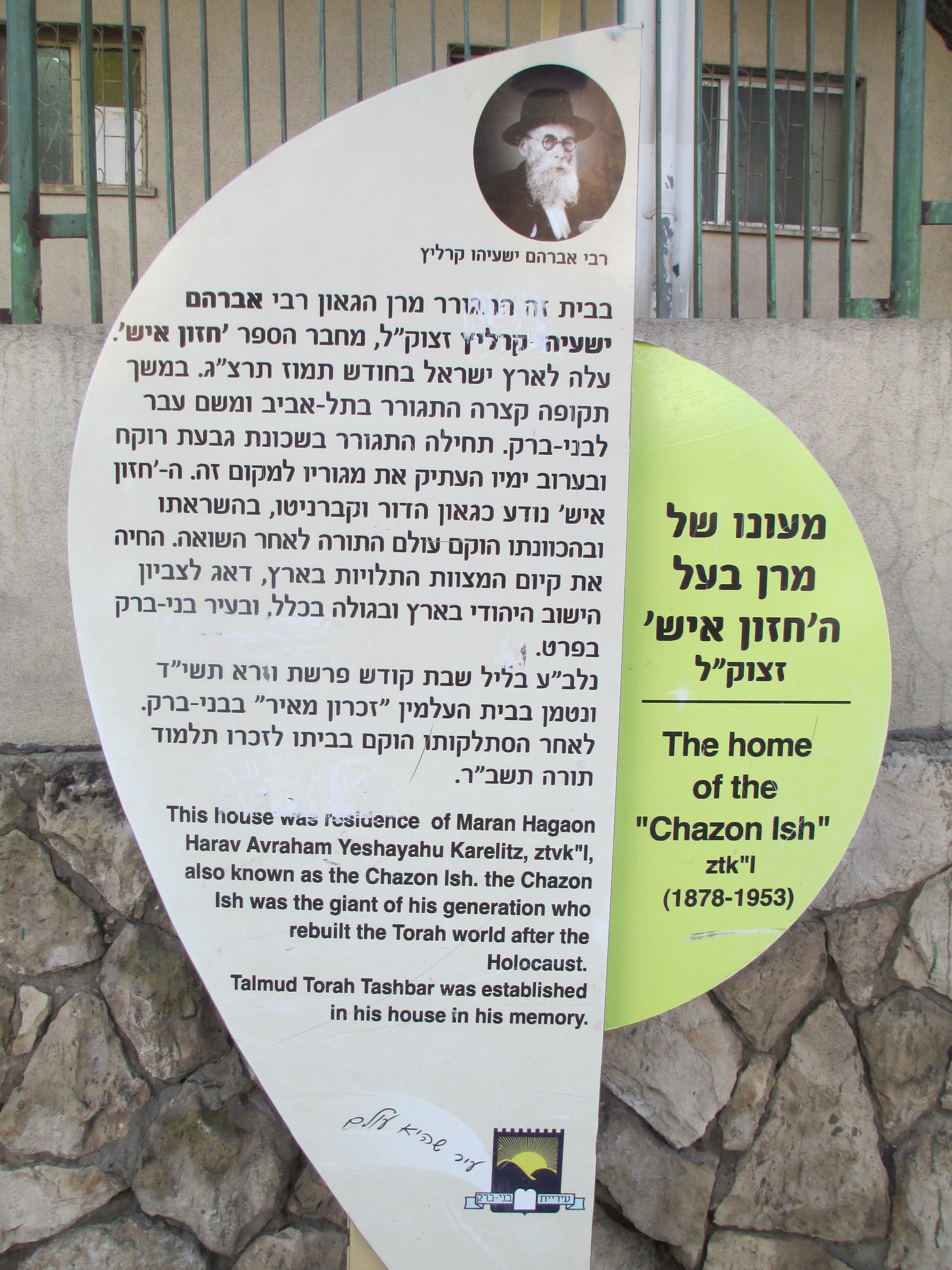
Memorial plaque near the house of the Hazon Ish at 37 Hazon Ish Street in Bnei Brak

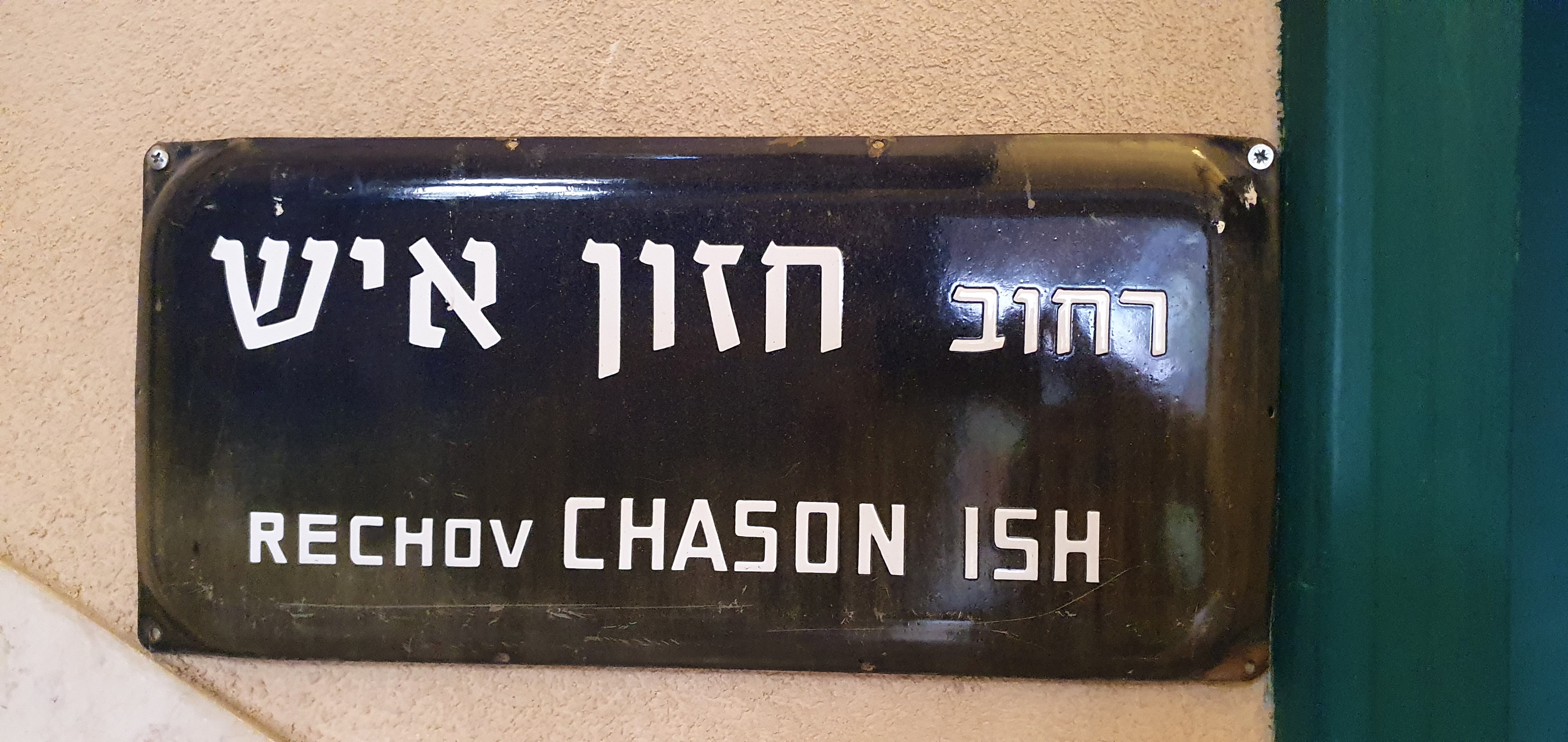
Hazon Ish Street sign

In 2025, a comprehensive preservation project was completed in his home in Bnei Brak, and the "Hazon Ish Heritage Center" was opened at the site (also called “Vision for Generations”). The center was established with joint funding from the Ministry of Tourism, the Ministry of Heritage, the Ministry of Culture and Sports, and the Municipality of Bnei Brak, as part of a national plan to develop tourism infrastructure. The historical rooms—the study room, the synagogue, and his living quarters—were restored under the guidance of preservation experts and architects, adapted to modern exhibition standards. Alongside the original displays, the visitors’ center incorporates multimedia features: a short documentary film produced especially for the tour presents his halakhic and public path, and an interactive presentation in the form of a “station train” leads the visitor through stations of his life from Lithuania to the Land of Israel.
