= Elyakim Schlesinger =

British Orthodox rabbi (1921–2026)

Rabbi Elyakim Schlesinger
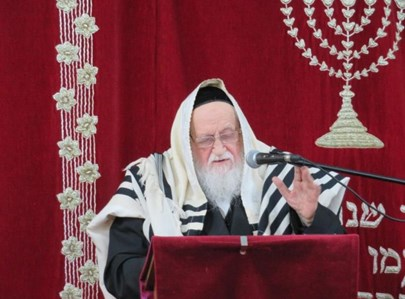

Head of the Rabbinical Board of the Committee for the Preservation of Jewish Cemeteries in Europe

Personal details
- Born: 23 November 1921 Vienna, Austria
- Died: 4 February 2026 (aged 104) London, England
- Relations: Jacob Rosenheim (grandfather)
- Children: 9
- Occupation: Rabbi, Rosh Yeshiva

Elyakim Schlesinger (Yiddish: אליקים שלעזינגער; 23 November 1921 – 4 February 2026) was an Austrian-born British Haredi rabbi and rosh yeshiva in London. He was an international authority on Jewish law and served as the President of the Committee for the Preservation of Jewish Cemeteries in Europe.

== Biography ==
Schlesinger was born in Vienna on 23 November 1921 to Rabbi David and Bela Schlesinger and was a grandson of Jacob Rosenheim, one of the founders of World Agudath Israel. He emigrated to Mandatory Palestine with his family in 1931. In 1944, he married Yehudis, the daughter of Rabbi Moshe Blau. He was very close to Rabbi Yosef Tzvi Dushinsky, Rabbi Avrohom Yeshaya Karelitz (the Chazon Ish), and the Brisker Rav. In around 1947, shortly after his marriage, he moved to London, England. He then opened a yeshiva named Yeshivah HaRama where he delivered lectures to its students until his death in 2026. In the last few years of his life, he held the title of 'world's oldest Rosh Yeshivah'. His wife died in 2019 after 74 years of marriage. Schlesinger died in Stamford Hill, London on 4 February 2026, aged 104.

Schlesinger was at the forefront of saving and preserving Jewish cemeteries and Nazi era mass graves all over Europe. He was opposed to Zionism and decried efforts by the Israeli government to draft yeshiva students, writing in 2013 that "we were warned beforehand that the purpose of the Zionist country is only to forcefully uproot religion... Now they are trying with all their might to uproot religious learning in the Holy Land, to destroy yeshivas, to force Torah students into the army or to prison". In 2018 he was among a group of Stamford Hill rabbis who issued a statement in support Labour leader Jeremy Corbyn which distanced themselves from the "irresponsible remarks" from other sections of the community which claimed that Jewish people would consider leaving the country if he ever became Prime Minister.
