= Moshe Rosen =

Moshe Rosen may refer to:

- Moses Rosen (1912–1994), Chief Rabbi of Romanian Jewry
- Moishe Rosen (1932–2010), founder of the organization Jews for Jesus
- Moshe Rosen (Nezer HaKodesh), (1870 – 12 October 1957), author of Nezer HaKodesh
