= Avraham Chaim Naeh =

Rabbi Avraham Chaim אברהם חיים Naeh
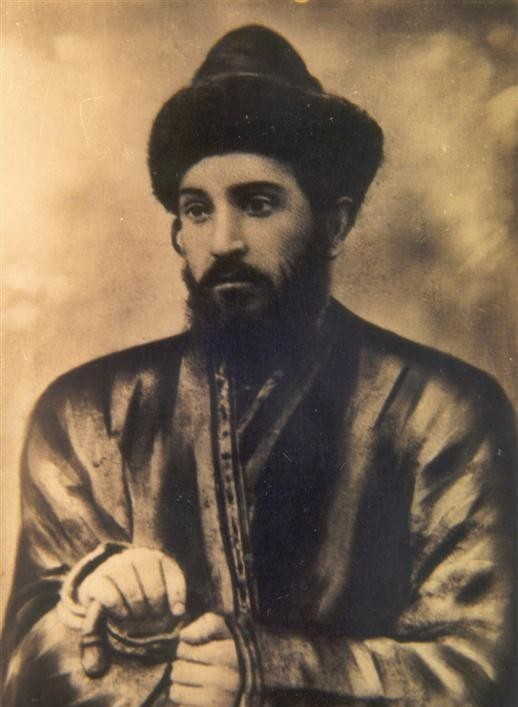

Personal life
- Born: 1890 Hebron, Mutasarrifate of Jerusalem, Ottoman Empire
- Died: 1954 (aged 63–64)
- Dynasty: Lubavitch

Religious life
- Religion: Judaism
- Denomination: Hasidism
- Yeshiva: Yeshivat Eretz Yisrael
- Position: Founder
- Dynasty: Lubavitch

Avraham Chaim Naeh (Hebrew: אברהם חיים נאה; 3 May 1890 – 21 July 1954) was a Lubavitcher Hasid and major posek (halachic authority) active during the first half of twentieth century. He is most famous for his works Ketzos ha-Shulchan, Piskei HaSiddur, Shi'urei Mikveh, and Shi'urei Torah (Measurements of the Torah); in the last work, he converted biblical measurements into contemporary measurements. The work is of great practical significance since much of Halacha involves specific requirements of precise sizes and quantities.

Naeh was born in Hebron. His father, Rabbi Menachem Mendel Naeh, was the dean of the Magen Avos Yeshiva, founded by the Sdei Chemed. He studied in his youth at the Ohel Moshe Yeshiva under Rabbi Yitzchak Yerucham Diskin. In 1912, Naeh published Chanoch LaNa'ar, a book containing laws for bar mitzvah boys.

When World War I broke out, the Ottoman authorities expelled people from Palestine who did not possess Turkish citizenship. Many of the dispossessed Jews found refuge in Alexandria, Egypt, where Naeh opened a yeshiva called "Yeshivat Eretz Yisrael". His yeshivah had 200 students who had been exiled from Jerusalem. In Alexandria, Naeh wrote Shenot Chaim, a special Kitzur Shulchan Aruch for Sephardic Jews. In 1918, he returned to Palestine and served as the personal secretary of the Edah HaChareidis, under Rabbi Yosef Chaim Sonnenfeld,. He published his most famous work Ketzos HaShulchan in 1926. In 1948, he was a founding member of the Rabbinic Council of Agudat Yisrael in Jerusalem and later helped found the haredi weekly newspapers, Kol Yisrael and HaModia.
