= Simcha Zelig Reguer =

Rav Simcha Zelig Reiger
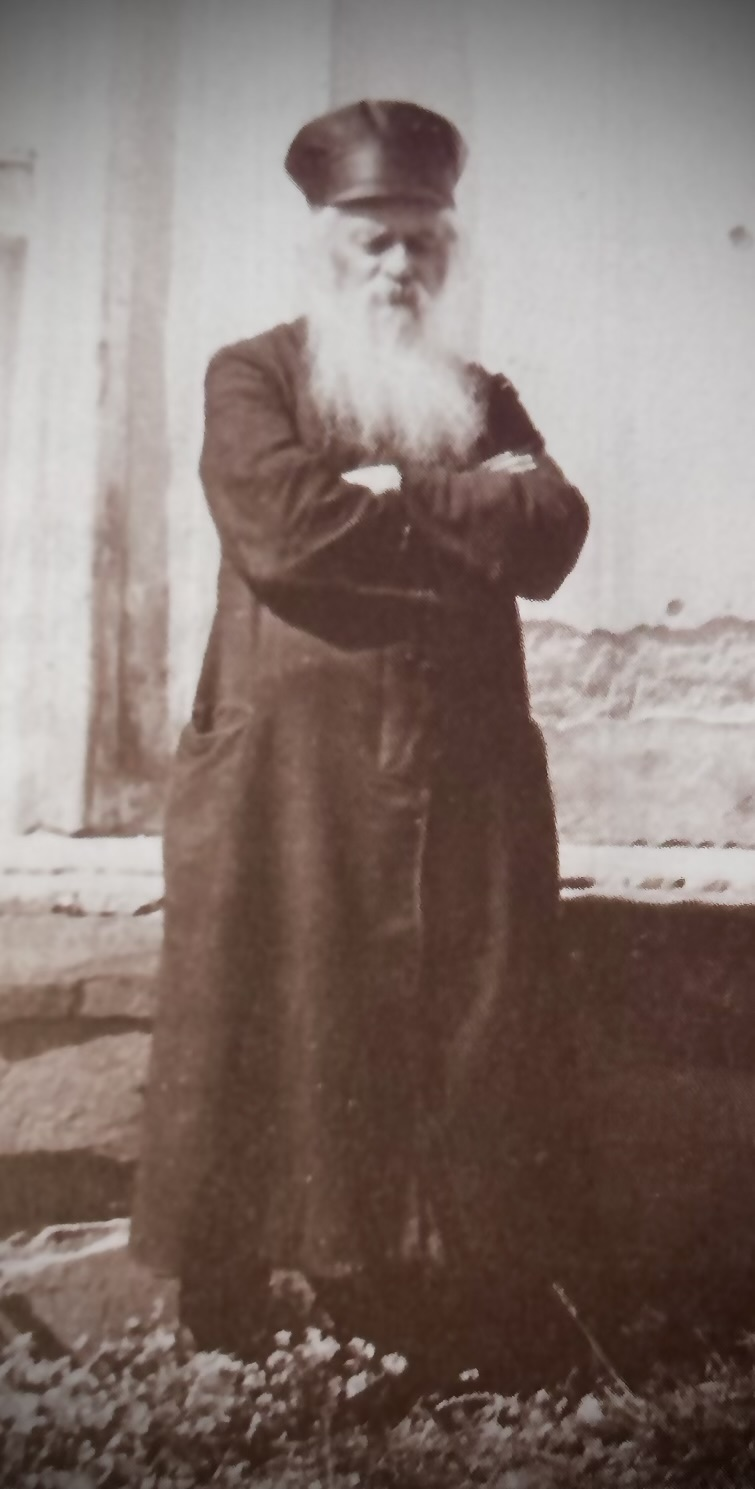
- Title: Dayan of Brisk

Personal life
- Born: February 27, 1864
- Died: October 15, 1942 (aged 78)

Religious life
- Religion: Judaism

Rabbi Simcha Zelig Reguer (1864–1942), שמחה זעליג ריגר Dayan of Brisk, was the chief Rabbinical judge of Brest-Litovsk and surrounding Lithuania.

== Biography ==
He was born in Navahrudak to Rabbi Dov Ber and Peshe Mogilensky. His father was a Torah scholar of high standing and a respected merchant in the city. In 1874, his family moved to Brisk. As a youth, he served Rabbi Yehoshua Leib Diskin until the end of the latter's tenure, and was greatly influenced by his methods of instruction. In 1882, he married the daughter of Rabbi Avraham Rudensky of Volozhin. Following his marriage, he entered the Volozhin Yeshiva, where he became a student of the Rosh Yeshiva, the Netziv, and his deputy, Rabbi Chaim Soloveitchik. When the Beis Halevi passed away the community sought to appoint his son, Rabbi Chaim, in his place. Rabbi Chaim agreed on the condition that Rabbi Simcha Zelig be appointed as the Moreh Hora'ah and Dayan, entrusting him with the responsibility for practical halakhic rulings and monetary disputes (this was likely because Rabbi Chaim sought to avoid formal halakhic adjudication). Even after Rabbi Chaim's passing and the appointment of his son, Rabbi Yitzchak Zev Soloveitchik, Rabbi Simcha Zelig continued to serve as the primary halakhic authority of Brisk.

=== Scholarship and Character ===
Rabbi Simcha Zelig stood out among the students of Volozhin because he did not focus on the standard analytical "theory-based" study of the Talmud, but rather on practical Halakha (Halakha Psuka). Even in the Yeshiva, he was famous as an expert and authority on complex halakhic matters. His speed in rendering decisions was remarkable; he could answer dozens of complex queries in just a few minutes.

Rabbi Chaim once remarked of him: "In the field of halakhic instruction, Rabbi Simcha Zelig is Chad B'Dara (unique in his generation)!" Public estimation of him grew even further after an incident where he publicly announced that he had erred in a previous ruling.

Beyond his legal brilliance, he was known for his piety. His daily prayers were described as "fiery" and emotional. When issuing a ruling, he was seized with fear and trembling lest he err, and he instructed his students to act with similar caution. His kindness and compassion were legendary, and he devoted himself entirely to acts of charity and chesed.

He was among the first rabbis to address the issue of the International Date Line in Jewish law. His view aligned with that of the Chazon Ish, though his specific position was not widely adopted by the public.

Rabbi Riger did not author books, but his teachings were published in various collections and journals. Notably, Rabbi Chaim of Brisk—who almost never cited contemporary "Achronim" in his works—cites Rabbi Simcha Zelig in three places, referring to him as "my friend, the Rashaz."

=== The Holocaust ===
Rabbi Riger was murdered in the Holocaust along with the Jews of Brisk in the month of Cheshvan, 5703 (1942). In his biography, Menachem Begin recalls how Nazi soldiers publicly humiliated Rabbi Simcha Zelig in the town square, cutting off his beard.

Rabbi Reguer and his family lived in the same house (but on separate floors) as Rabbi Chaim Soloveichik, head of the Volozhin Yeshiva, and his family.

=== Notable Students ===
- Rabbi Isser Yehuda Unterman, later the Chief Rabbi of Israel.
- Rabbi Aharon Yehuda Leib Shteinman, a prominent leader of the Haredi world.
