= Benjamin Brown (scholar) =

Israeli scholar of Jewish studies

- בנימין בראון
- Born: July 1, 1966 (age 60); Tel Aviv, Israel
- Citizenship: Israeli
- Occupations: Academic, philosopher
- Employer(s): Hebrew University of Jerusalem; Israel Democracy Institute

Academic background
- Education: Hebrew University of Jerusalem (BA, MA, PhD)
- Doctoral advisor: Aviezer Ravitzky
- Other advisor: Eliezer Schweid (MA)

Academic work
- Discipline: Jewish thought, Orthodox Judaism, Philosophy
- Main interests: Haredi Judaism, Halakha, Musar movement, Hasidic Judaism, Epistemology, Ontology
- Notable works: The Hazon Ish (2011); Thoughts and Ways of Thinking (2017); Hasidic Leadership in Israel (2025); The Foundations of Rational Metaphysics (2025)

Benjamin Brown (Hebrew: בנימין בראון; born July 1, 1966) is an Israeli academic, philosopher, and professor of Judaism and Jewish thought. He holds a full professorship in the Department of Jewish Thought at the Hebrew University of Jerusalem. He has also served as a research fellow at the Israel Democracy Institute's Ultra-Orthodox in Israel Program, where much of his research on Haredi society has been published. His research focuses on Orthodox Judaism and the ultra-Orthodox community through historical and theological frameworks, and his philosophical books are on formal ontology and epistemology.

== Biography ==
Brown was born in Tel Aviv and raised in Bnei Brak. He completed his undergraduate studies in law and philosophy at the Hebrew University of Jerusalem. He wrote his doctoral dissertation on the Hazon Ish under the supervision of Aviezer Ravitzky. He later completed post-doctoral studies at Harvard University.

== Academic work ==
=== Haredi society and ideology ===
Brown traces the historical and political structures of ultra-Orthodox society. He documented the expansion of Daas Torah during the late 19th and early 20th centuries in his 2011 book, Toward Democratization in Haredi Leadership?. His 2012 book, Trembling at the Word of the People, specifies the methods Haredi thinkers use to critique Israeli democratic systems.

Brown published The Hazon Ish: Halakhist, Believer and Leader of the Haredi Revolution in 2011. This monograph demonstrates how Rabbi Avraham Yeshaya Karelitz altered the social structure of post-independence Israeli Judaism through strict legal rulings. He co-edited the biographical study The Gdoilim: Leaders Who Shaped the Israeli Haredi Jewry with Nissim Leon in 2017. His subsequent books, The Haredim: A Guide to Their Beliefs and Sectors (2017) and Society in Transition (2021), classify the ideological groups and economic shifts within contemporary Israeli ultra-Orthodoxy.

=== Hasidic studies ===
Brown publishes on the institutional history of Hasidism. He analyzed the Karlin dynastic branch in his 2018 book, "Like a Ship on a Stormy Sea": The Story of Karlin Hasidism. He co-authored Hasidism: A New History (2017), tracking the movement from its Eastern European origins into the 21st century.

His recent work focuses on ascetic practices and the role of the Tzadik. His 2024 monograph, Holiness and Law, evaluates the friction between Kabbalistic customs and sexual abstinence rules within the Gur, Slonim, and Toldot Aharon Hasidic groups. His 2025 book, Hasidic Leadership in Israel: Past and Present, Spirit and Matter, tracks how the hereditary authority of Hasidic rebbes adapted to the post-Holocaust era.

=== Musar movement ===
In 2014, Brown published a historical overview of the Lithuanian Musar movement. The book maps the movement's major figures and their specific psychological approaches to ethics.

=== Halakha ===
Brown's papers on Jewish jurisprudence examine how authorities balance formal and teleological considerations, and analyze the general concepts underlying their specific rulings. He categorized modern religious stringency into five distinct models, based on the different motivations of their authors.

He published several studies on the Hafetz Hayim. These papers analyze how the halakhic authority applied classical texts to modern labor issues and wage disputes. They also examine his rulings on libel law. Brown introduced the framework of "halakhic realism" in 2022 to describe the short, direct written decisions utilized by contemporary rabbis, using the legal responsa of Rabbi Chaim Kanievsky as his primary case study.

=== Philosophy ===
Brown works in formal epistemology and ontology. In Thoughts and Ways of Thinking: Source Theory and Its Applications (2017), he presents a model explaining how human actors select underlying "truth-sources" to evaluate incoming data. His 2025 book, The Foundations of Rational Metaphysics, develops a systematic theory of categorization and predication to analyze the most fundamental concepts of logic and ontology. Each of these books presents a formal calculus relevant to its subject.
