= Moshe Rosen (Nezer HaKodesh) =

Polish Orthodox rabbi, author of "Nezer HaKodesh"

Rabbi Moshe Rosen
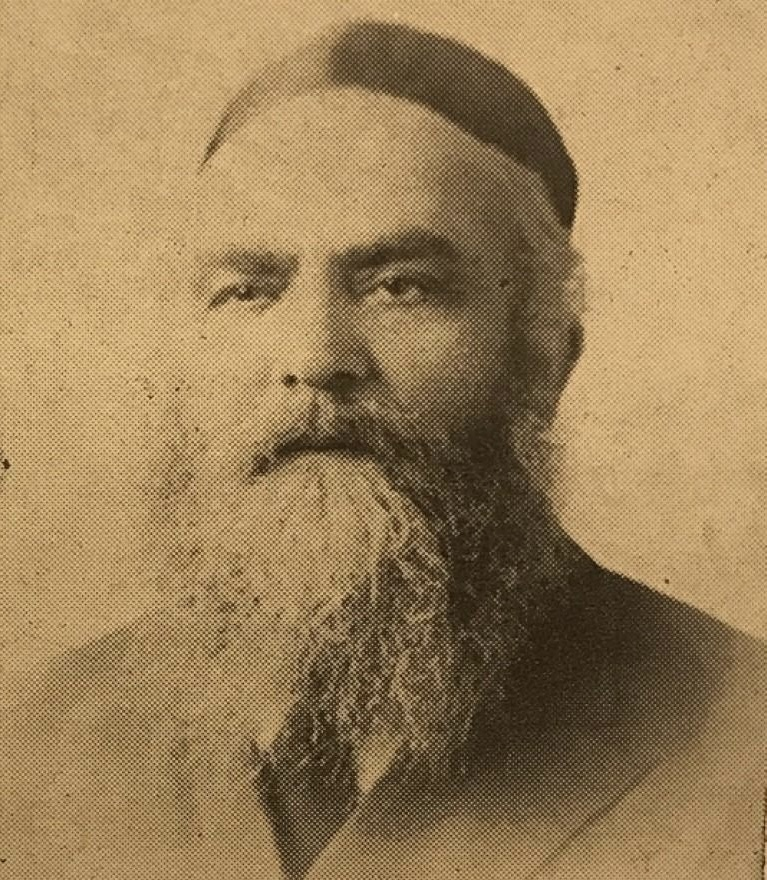

Personal life
- Born: 1870 Brańsk, Grodno Governorate, Poland
- Died: October 12, 1957 (aged 86–87) Queens, New York
- Buried: Queens, New York
- Spouse: Hinda, daughter of Hillel David Trivash
- Children: Chaim Rosen, Aba Yosef Rosen (died at age 14), Shlomo (died at age 3), Leah Litwack, Sara Gaz, Chayna Rosen, Frieda Gutman-Dowertz, Ester Krinsky
- Parent: Yehuda Aryeh Rosen
- Occupation: Rabbi, Rosh Yeshiva

Religious life
- Religion: Judaism
- Synagogue: Congregation Beth Medrash HaRav
- Yeshiva: Yeshiva Torah Vodaas
- Organization: Mizrachi (religious Zionism), Agudath Harabbonim
- Main work: Nezer HaKodesh
- Residence: Brownsville, New York
- Semikhah: Yitzchak Elchanan Spektor

Moshe Rosen (1870 – 12 October 1957), known by the name of his magnum opus, Nezer HaKodesh on Kodashim, was a Polish Orthodox rabbi who befriended the Chazon Ish while serving as a rabbi in Lithuania and later became a well respected Torah scholar in the United States of America.

== Biography ==
=== In Europe ===
Born in 1870 in Brańsk, Grodno Governorate, Poland, to Yehuda Aryeh of the Rosen family, which was made of many Torah scholars, Moshe Rosen learned in the local school in Brańsk, then in Bielsk Podlaski by Aryeh Leib Yellin, and finally in Raszyn by Mordechai Gimpel Jaffe before pursuing his studies independently. He had a close relationship with the rabbi of Brańsk, Meir Shalom HaKohen, author of Milchemet Shalom, and he was known as a "masmid" (non-stop learner of Torah).

Upon marrying Hinda, daughter of Hillel David Trivash, in 1893, Rosen studied in Kovno Kollel and was ordained by Rabbis Yitzchak Elchanan Spektor and Moshe Danishevsky at the age of twenty. In 1897, Rosen was installed as the rabbi of Chweidan (Kvėdarna), Lithuania, where he remained until his departure to the United States, despite several offers from other communities. He was active in the community, rescuing people from forced labor and mandatory labor on the Shabbat. He established the Agudath HaRabbonim of Lithuania and stood at its head.

Rosen was also a contributor to the first three issues of his father-in-law's Torah journal HaPisga, the first article of which was entitled "Aruch laNer" and attacked an enlightened view of the Miracle of Chanukah. His words were praised and analyzed by Chaim Hezekiah Medini

==== Relationship with R' Avrohom Yeshaya Karelitz (Chazon Ish) ====
The Chazon Ish’s wife was from Chweidan, the Chazon Ish lived there after getting married (Rosen was the officiating Rabbi). Rosen and the Chazon Ish established a close relationship and began studying Torah together. He developed tremendous respect for his younger study partner and considered himself the student, not the teacher. Rosen and the Chazon Ish became quite close, and the former would call upon the latter to join him on the Beit Din when serious matters requiring expert dayanim were brought to the table. They would work together on matters of community, and Rosen's daughter, Leah, would assist Karelitz's wife in her store and home.

All the while, the Chazon Ish's genius was kept hidden from the public. Even when the Chazon Ish began delivering a Gemara lecture to local townspeople, and Rav Moshe Rosen would himself attend, people were given the impression that the rabbi of the town was coming to encourage the young Karelitz. Indeed, even when Rosen published his first sefer, Divrei Soferim, he quotes Karelitz as "Chazon Ish," a name that, at the time, nobody but he recognized. Rosen couldn't afford to publish this sefer, though, due to his unlivable salary as a rabbi, so Karelitz loaned him some of his own dowry and said not to worry. It was Rosen who first told Chaim Ozer Grodzinski about the unknown, hidden genius, Avrohom Yeshaya Karelitz. Rosen was a Zionist, unlike the Chazon Ish. There was a plan to publish Masechet Kelim with three commentaries, that of the Chazon Ish, Rav Chaim Ozer Grodzinski, and Rav Moshe Rosen, but the plan did not come to fruition, as Rav Chaim Ozer was too busy with his other responsibilities. Later in life, someone told Rosen that the Chazon Ish could learn 100 pages of Gemara a day, to which Rosen responded that he hadn't heard of that, but he had seen the man learn one page of Gemara over a hundred days and the first perek of Mikvaot for three months, fifteen hours a day!

The Chazon Ish also proofread the volume of Nezer ha-Kodesh on Zevahim, except in order to blunt his comments, he articulated them in Rosen's own style to make it seem as though Rosen himself was writing corrections, not someone else.

After the Chazon Ish left Chweidan, their friendship continued in the form of the letters they wrote to one another discussing various Torah topics.

=== In America ===
In 1928 Rosen immigrated to the United States, where he became a Talmud instructor at Mesivta Torah Vodaath. After only one year, he left the Torah Vodaath yeshiva in favor of the professional rabbinate, serving as a pulpit rabbi at several congregations in Brooklyn for the next two decades. Rosen spent his final years as rabbi of Congregation Beth Medrash HaRav in Brooklyn. An advocate of religious Zionism, Rosen worked for the benefit of Mizrachi and the Jewish National Fund. He was active on behalf of Ezrat Torah and the Agudath Harabbonim, later serving as honorary president of the Agudath Harabbonim. An exceptional Talmudic scholar who maintained correspondence with many of the leading sages of the day, and publishing several volumes of halakhic studies and more than a dozen volumes of Talmudic commentary, Nezer Ha-Kodesh. He was well known for his erudition and deep Torah insights both while he was still in Europe and throughout his life in America.

Rosen was the Rosh Yeshiva of the Beis Midrash level of Torah Vodaath from September 1926 to June 1928. Upon his departure, the Beis Midrash students also left. Rabbi Dovid Leibowitz joined the faculty of Torah Vodaath in June, 1927, and when the Beis Midrash was reorganized in 1929, became the Rosh Yeshiva. One of his notable students was Avraham Yaakov Pam.

Rosen was reportedly offered a position at RIETS but declined.

He also collected money to support the Chazon Ish, Yitzchok Zev Soloveitchik, and institutions of Torah learning regularly. During World War II, he helped organize a Vaad Hatzalah to help Jews escape to America.

Rosen was married to Hinda, the daughter of Rav Hillel David Trivash. She died on March 12, 1952 (Shushan Purim), and he died in New York in October (first day of Chol HaMoed Sukkot, 1957, at the age of 86. He was survived by a son and five daughters. As he died on a Friday which was also the second day of Sukkot, Rabbi Moshe Feinstein advised the funeral be delayed until Sunday in his honor (i.e. not to bury on Friday afternoon or Saturday night). At the funeral, he was eulogized by Rabbis Aharon Kotler, Moshe Feinstein, Avraham Kalmanowitz, Yosef Eliyahu Henkin, Pinchas Mordechai Teitz, and Nissan Telushkin.

== Published works ==
- Divrei Soferim. 2 vols. Vilna and New York: 1912, 1955
- Nezer Ha-Kodesh al Masechet Zevachim. Vilna: 1910.
- Sheiloth Moshe. Vilna: 1930.
- Nezer Ha-Kodesh al Masechet Menachot. New York: 1934.
- Nezer Ha-Kodesh al Masechet Temura. New York: 1936.
- Nezer Ha-Kodesh al Masechet Arachin. New York: 1937.
- Nezer Ha-Kodesh al Masechet Keritot. New York: 1938.
- Sheilot Moshe. New York: 1940.
- Nezer Ha-Kodesh al Masechet Yoma. New York: 1942.
- Nezer Ha-Kodesh al Masechet Makkot. New York: 1943.
- Nezer Ha-Kodesh al Masechet Me'ila. New York: 1943.
- Nezer Ha-Kodesh al Masechet Bechorot. New York: 1945.
- Nezer Ha-Kodesh al Masechet Nida. New York: 1946.
- Nezer Ha-Kodesh al Masechet Hulin. Brooklyn: 1950.
- Nezer Ha-Kodesh al Masechet Tamid. Brooklyn: 1951.
- Nezer Ha-Kodesh al Masechet Hullin, Zevachim Second Ed. New York: 1953.
- Nezer Ha-Kodesh v'Shut. Brooklyn: 1953.
- Ohel Moshe. New York: 1963.

His grandson, Rabbi Hillel Litwack published a pamphlet called Zichron Moshe, which is a collection of letters between Rosen and great Torah personalities of his time, Yisrael Meir Kagan, Meir Simcha of Dvinsk, Chazon Ish, Elchanan Wasserman, Boruch Ber Leibowitz, the Rogatchover Gaon, Yitzchok Zev Soloveitchik, Tzvi Pesach Frank, Moshe Mordechai Epstein, and Menachem Mendel Schneerson. Unpublished letters include communications between him and Moshe Soloveitchik and Chaim Hezekiah Medini. In April 2019, his descendants republished Nezer HaKodesh in five newly typeset volumes.

== Descendants ==
Rosen and his wife had seven children, including Chaim Rosen, author of seven seforim: Bechori Chaim (5 volumes), Ein Chaim (2 volumes), and Be'er Chaim.
