= Untermann =

Untermann is a German surname. Notable people with the surname include:

- Ernest Untermann (1864–1956), German-American sailor, socialist writer, translator and newspaper editor
- Jürgen Untermann (1928–2013), German linguist, indoeuropeanist and epigraphist
- Matthias Untermann (born 1956), German art historian and medieval archaeologist

== See also ==
- Unterman
