= Reva Unterman =

Reva Unterman (born 1957) is a columnist and author who uses the pen name Reva Mann.

Mann is the granddaughter of the former Chief Ashkenazi Rabbi of the State of Israel, Isser Yehuda Unterman, and the daughter of Morris Unterman, rabbi of the West End Marble Arch synagogue in London. She was born in London but has lived in Israel since the mid-1980s. She attended a Jewish school in London until the age of ten. After her expulsion from Sinai College, a Jewish boarding school, her father sent her to Queen's College, a secular upper-class school for girls in London.

Her autobiographical book, The Rabbi's Daughter: Sex, Drugs and Orthodoxy, describes her teenage experiments with sex and drugs, study at the Or Zion women's yeshiva in Jerusalem, and eventual return to the Orthodox fold.

Mann is a columnist TotallyJewish.com, and previously for The Jewish Advocate. She is divorced with three children.

== Books ==
- The Rabbi's Daughter: Sex, Drugs and Orthodoxy ISBN 978-0-340-94365-6
