= Jacob Rosenheim =

German author and publisher (1870–1965)

- יעקב רוזנהיים
- Born: 5 November 1870; Frankfurt, German Empire
- Died: 3 November 1965 (aged 94); Jerusalem, Israel
- Organization: World Agudath Israel
- Spouse: Gertrude Straus
- Relatives: Elyakim Schlesinger (grandson)

Jacob Rosenheim (Hebrew: יעקב רוזנהיים; also, Jakob or Yaakov Rosenheim; 5 November 1870 – 3 November 1965) was a German-born Israeli publisher, author, and the co-founder of World Agudath Israel.

== Biography ==
Rosenheim was born in Frankfurt as the son of Elias Rosenheim and Charlotte Kaufmann. His father worked as a bookseller, and his parents were early adherents to Samson Raphael Hirsch's neo-Orthodox Judaism movement. He graduated from a Frankfurt grammar school and from the Israelite Religious Society in 1886.

He was married to Gertrude Straus, the daughter of banker Samuel Straus of Karlsruhe, a fellow member of the neo-Orthodox movement. From 1906 to 1935, he was the editor of German magazine Der Israelit, and chairman of the Israelite Religious Society in Frankfurt. In 1912, he co-founded World Agudath Israel, and served as its president for many years. He used his ownership of Der Israelit to help promote the views and goals of his organization. Rosenheim emigrated to England following the rise of the Nazi Party in Germany, and from 1941 to 1950, he lived in exile in the United States. He immigrated to Israel after its independence in 1948 and lived in Jerusalem and Bnei Brak until his death in 1965.

== Family ==
Rosenheim was married to Gertrude Straus, and was the grandfather of British rabbi Elyakim Schlesinger.

== Works ==
- Rosenheim, Jacob (1920). Beiträge zur Orientierung im jüdischen Geistesleben der Gegenwart (in German). Arzenu.
- Rosenheim, Jacob (1930). Zur innerjüdischen Politik in Deutschland. Zionismus und jüdische Weltpolitik. Agudas Jisroel. Um das heilige Land. Gestalten (in German). J. Kauffmann.
- Rosenheim, Jacob (1930). Von jüdischer Lehrer und Weltanschauung. Von jüdischem Gemeindeleben und Erziehungswesen (in German). J. Kauffmann.
- Rosenheim, Jacob (1931). Agudistische Schriften (in German). Herausgegeben von der deutschen Landesorganisation der Agudas Jisroel.
- Rosenheim, Jacob (1951). Samson Raphael Hirsch's Cultural Ideal and Our Times. Shapiro, Vallentine & Company.
