= Chaim Hezekiah Medini =

Ukrainian rabbi (1834–1904)

Rabbi Haim Hezekiah Medini
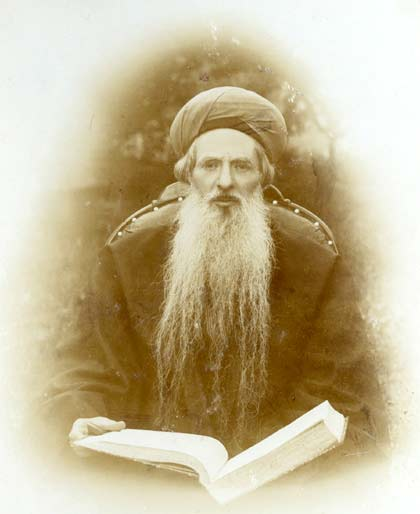
- Rabbi Haim Hezekiah Medini
- Title: Chief Rabbi

Personal life
- Born: 1834 Jerusalem, Ottoman Empire
- Died: 1904 (aged 69–70) Hebron, Ottoman Empire
- Parent(s): Raphael Asher Eliyahu Medini and Kalu Vida
- Notable work(s): Sede Hemed, Or Li, Paku'ot Sadeh, Miktav le-Hizkiyahu, Sefer Bakashot
- Known for: Sede Hemed
- Occupation: Rabbi, Halakhic scholar

Religious life
- Religion: Judaism

Senior posting
- Post: Chief Rabbi of Kara-Su-Bazar; Chief Rabbi of Hebron

Haim Hezekiah Medini (Hebrew: חיים חזקיהו מדיני Jerusalem 1834 – Hebron, 1904), also known by the title of his chief halakhic work, Sede Hemed, was a nineteenth century rabbinical scholar.

== Biography ==
Hezekiah Medini (later Haim Hezekiah Meidini) was born in Jerusalem. The name "Haim," lit. life" was added during a period of serious illness. This led to his initials spelling Chacham, appropriately a play on words that also means a sage. His parents were Rabbi Raphael Asher Eliyahu Medini and Kalu Vida. Medini married Rivka at the age of eighteen and studied Torah under the Rishon LeZion (Sephardic Chief Rabbi) Yitzchak Kubo and Rabbi Joseph Nissim Burla, head of the Jerusalem rabbinical court. He received his ordination (semichah) at the age of 19. In the wake of his father's sudden death in 1853, he moved to Constantinople where he and his family were supported by wealthy cousins. He also tutored children for a number of hours a day. Although recognized as a scholar and offered a position on the city's rabbinical court, he preferred to devote his time to study and writing. It was in Constantinople that he published his first work, Michtav Lehizkiyahu in 1865.

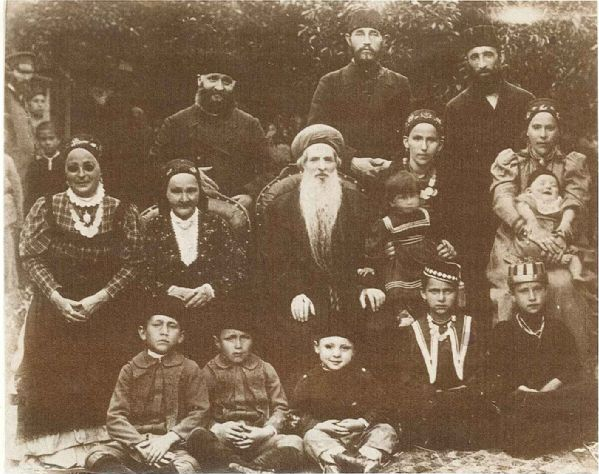
Rabbi Haim Hezekiah Medini in Crimea. His wife Rivka bat Luna is to his right.

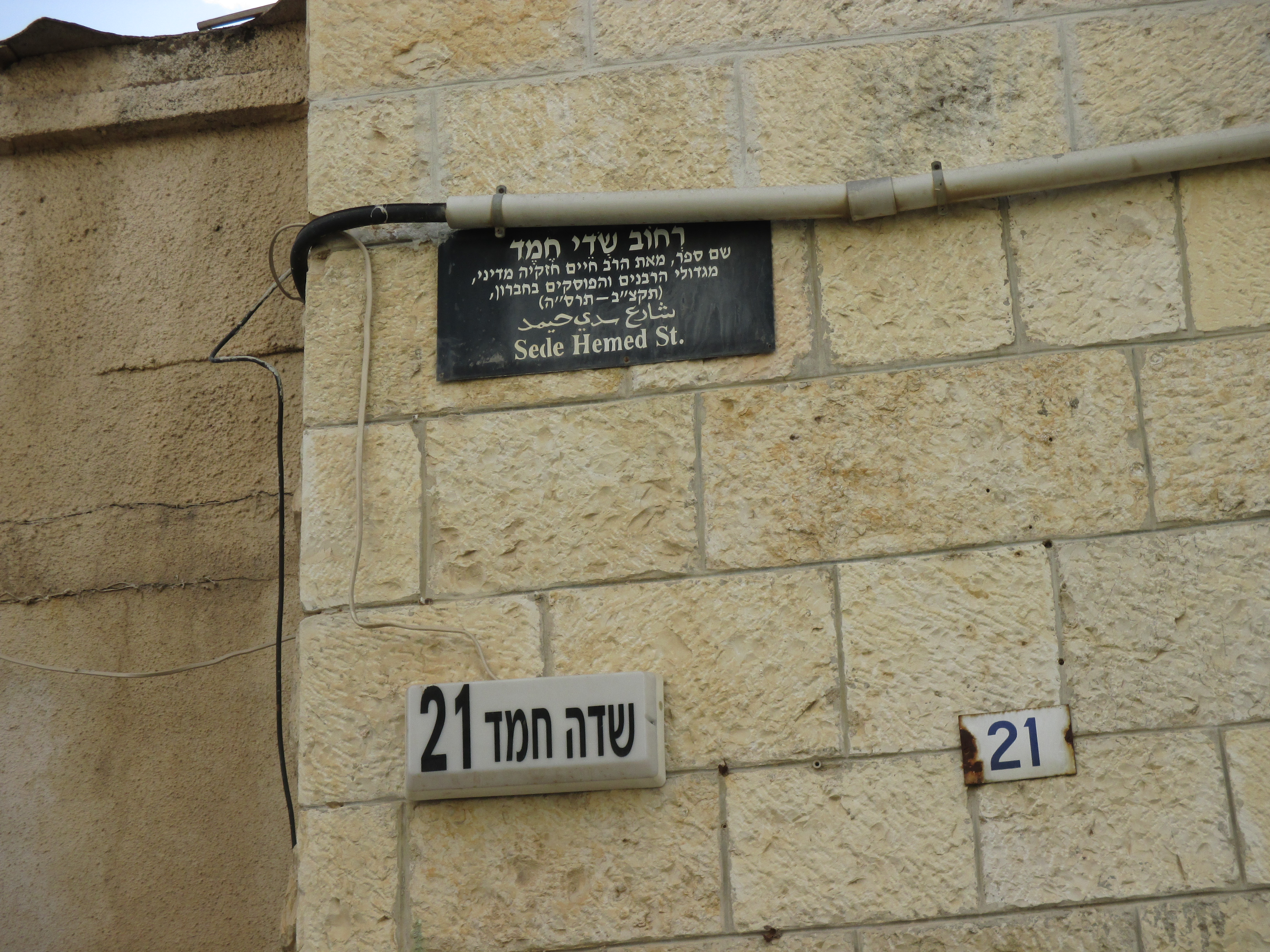
Street in Jerusalem named in memory of Rabbi Haim Hezekiah Medini, author of the Sede Hemed

== Rabbinic career ==
When traveling Jewish merchants from the Crimea offered him the rabbinate there, he accepted and moved to Kara-Su-Bazar (modern day Bilohirsk), in Crimea, where he served from 1867 until 1899, establishing a yeshiva and raising the level of observance of the community that had been without a rabbi for many years. He had one son and three daughters. His only son died in 1868 (5628) and Haim Hizkiyahu wrote a sefer in memory of his son and called it Or Li ("Light Unto Me"), and published it in Smyrna in 5634 (1874). In humility the author published the book anonymously. It contains responsa and Talmudic interpretations. He also wrote a halachic work entitled Paku'ot Sadeh (Jerusalem, 1900) and Sefer Bakashot (Odessa, 1879) containing piyutim (liturgical poems) which Oriental Jewish communities included in their services on Shabbat and festivals. The latter was republished in an enlarged edition under the name Ne'im Zemirot (Warsaw, 1886). He is also the author of several collections of responsa which appeared in various books by other authors.

During his 33 years in Kara-Su-Bazar he wrote the greater part of his chief work, the Sede Hemed, corresponding with sages around the world to clarify the laws as stated. This work is in form an encyclopedia of responsa, and was, together with Isaac Lampronti's Pahad Yitzchak, the main indexing resource for responsa until the emergence of modern resources such as the Talmudic Encyclopedia and the Otzar ha-Poskim database.

In 1899, Medini returned to the holy land, staying at first in Jerusalem for two years. Upon hearing that he was suggested as Rishon Letzion, Sepharadi Chief Rabbi, he moved to Hebron in 1901, hoping to be allowed to study in peace. However, shortly after his arrival Hebron's two major Torah scholars, Hakham Eliyahu Mani and Hakham Yosef Franco, died and a search for a new chief rabbi of Hebron had begun. At first, Medini rejected all offers but eventually relented and served as chief rabbi there until his death in 1904. After his passing, the Arab community attempted to steal his body for ransom the Jewish community hired guards to safeguard the cemetery. He lived in the Beit Romano building which today has a recreation of his study. The street has been named in his honor. In 2018 the Hezekiah neighborhood was issued final zoning permits named after him. His burial site in the ancient Jewish cemetery of Hebron can be viewed today. Sde Hemed, translated from Hebrew means "fields of grace", and is also the name of a moshav in central Israel near Kfar Saba and an elementary school in Maale Adumim.

== Published works ==
- Miktav le-Hizkiyahu – Talmudic studies and responsa; Part 1, Part 2 (Smyrna, 1865).
- Or Li – responsa; (Smyrna, 1874).
- Paku'ot Sadeh – (Jerusalem, 1900).
- Sede Chemed – his chief work, a 9 volume encyclopedic collection of laws and decisions in alphabetical order (Warsaw, 1890). Vol. 1, Vol. 2, Vol. 3, Vol. 4, Vol. 5, Vol. 6, Vol. 7, Vol. 8, Vol. 9.

Pi'ot Hasadeh and Shiyurei Hapayah are the author's glosses on Sdei Chemed and are included in that work. Sedar Birchat Hachamah and the author's living will were also published in Sdei Chemed.
