= Isser Yehuda Unterman =

Ashkenazi Chief Rabbi of Israel (1964-1972)

Rabbi Isser Yehuda Unterman
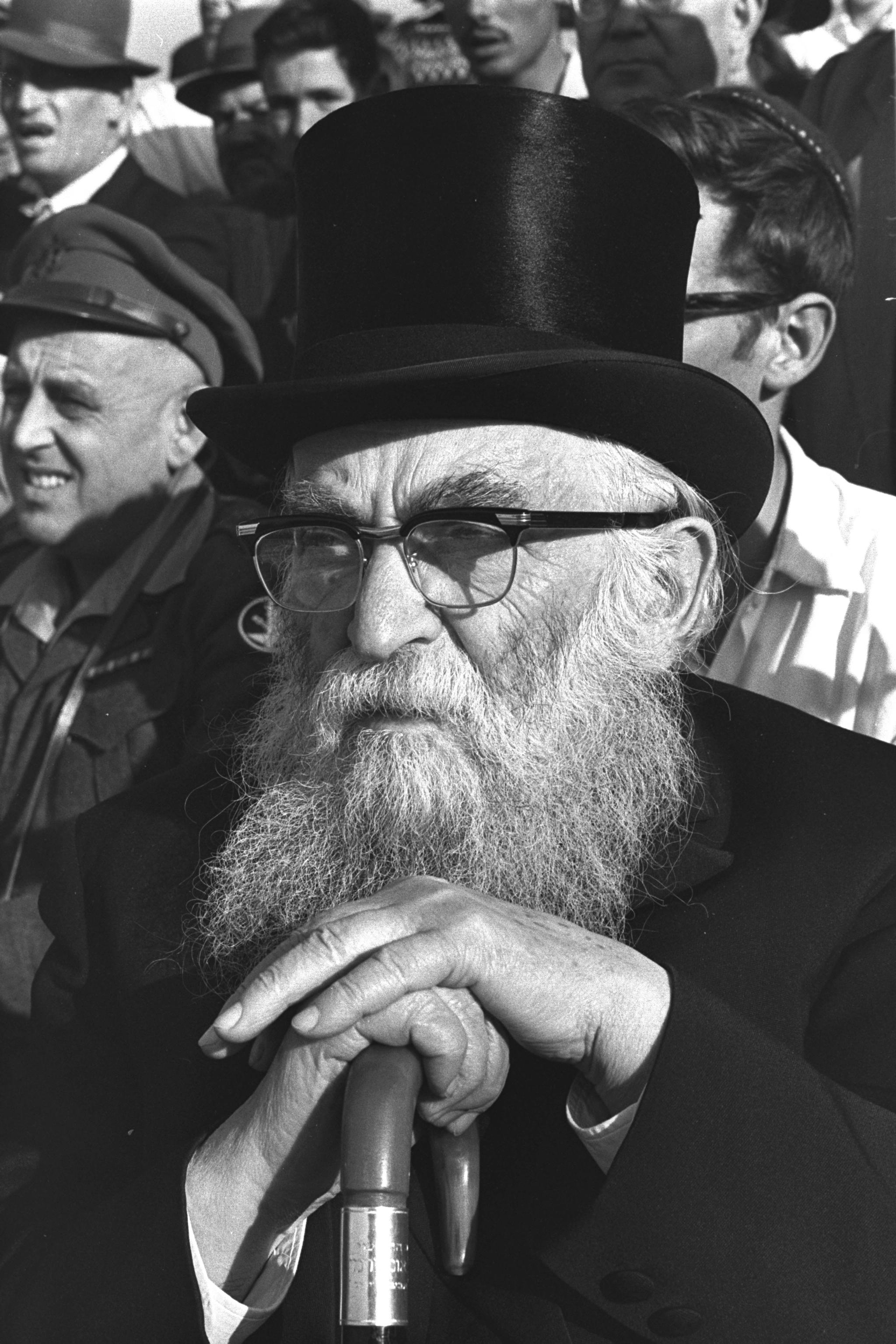
- Rabbi Isser Yehuda Unterman, 1964
- Title: Chief Rabbi of Israel

Personal life
- Born: Isser Yehuda Unterman; 19 April 1886 Brest-Litovsk, Russian Empire
- Died: 26 January 1976 (aged 89) Jerusalem, Israel
- Buried: Mount of Olives, Jerusalem
- Spouse: Rachel Leah Yellin
- Children: 7, including Baruch Unterman
- Parent(s): Eliyahu Unterman (father) and Sheina Unterman (mother)
- Education: Volozhin Yeshiva
- Occupation: Rabbi, Posek

Religious life
- Religion: Judaism
- Denomination: Orthodox Judaism

Jewish leader
- Predecessor: Yitzhak HaLevi Herzog
- Successor: Shlomo Goren
- Position: Ashkenazi Chief Rabbi
- Organisation: Chief Rabbinate of Israel
- Began: 1964
- Ended: 1972
- Other: Chief Rabbi of Tel Aviv (1946–1964)
- Yahrtzeit: 26 January 1976
- Residence: Jerusalem, Israel
- Semikhah: Rabbi Refael Shapiro

Isser Yehuda Unterman (Hebrew: איסר יהודה אונטרמן; 19 April 1886 – 26 January 1976) was the third chief rabbi of Tel Aviv, and later the third Ashkenazi Chief Rabbi of the State of Israel from 1964 until 1972. He was a leader of the Mizrachi movement and was awarded the Rabbi Kook Prize for Rabbinic Literature in 1954.

== Biography ==
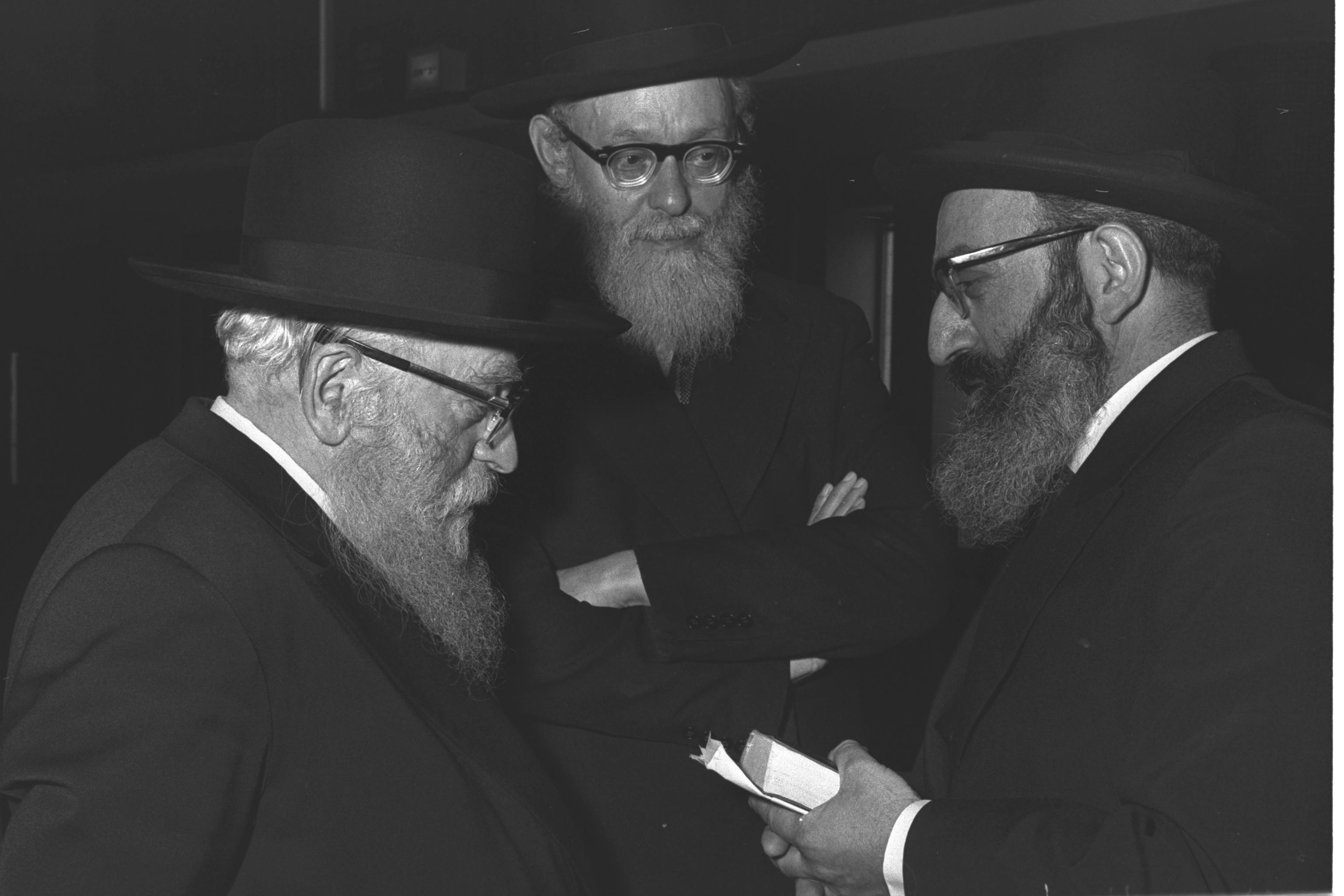
Rabbi Isser Yehuda Unterman, Chief Rabbi of Israel and head of the rabbinical court of Tel Aviv-Jaffa, with Rabbi Yosef Shalom Elyashiv, member of the Jerusalem Rabbinical Court, and Rabbi Shlomo Goren, Chief Rabbi of Israel and Chief Military Rabbi of Israel (right)

Born in Brisk, he was the son of Eliyahu and Sheina Unterman. He was named after the city's rabbi, Rabbi Isser Yehuda Malin, who had died about ten years earlier in Jerusalem. In his childhood, he was considered a prodigy and studied with the local rabbi and dayan Simcha Zelig Riger. In 1898, at age 12, he was invited to be part of the founding core of the Etz Chaim yeshiva in Maletz under the leadership of Rabbi Zalman Sender Kahana Shapira. He briefly studied at the Mir Yeshiva but returned to Maletz, where he became a prominent student of Rabbi Shimon Shkop. After his marriage to Rachel Leah Yellin, he studied at the kollel of Volozhin Yeshiva, where he was also ordained as a rabbi by Rabbi Raphael Shapiro, the head of the yeshiva. During his studies in Volozhin, Rabbi Unterman opened a yeshiva in the nearby town of Vishnevo and served as a rabbi in several Lithuanian communities, including Mohilev and Mstibovo. After World War I, he served as a rabbi in Lunovlya and later in Grodno.

Rabbi Unterman was a Zionist and one of the prominent rabbis who supported the ideology of the Mizrachi. In 1922, at the third Mizrachi conference in Poland, he delivered a central speech opposing the Uganda Plan, stating:

"I do not advocate for a Zionism based on the negation of poverty and pressure in the diaspora, as such Zionism may lead to a failed initiative like establishing a Jewish state in Uganda. Zionism needs a soul, a strong spiritual foundation based on the heritage of generations."

In 1923, under the influence of Rabbi Chaim Ozer Grodzenski, leader of Litvak Jewry, Rabbi Unterman moved to England and served as the rabbi of Liverpool. He quickly overcame the language barrier and became an active figure in the local Jewish community. He established an umbrella organization for all the Jewish communities in the area, brought in students from Europe to strengthen the local yeshiva, and founded the Liverpool Academy for Torah Studies.

During World War II, Rabbi Unterman worked on behalf of Jewish refugees from Germany who were treated as enemy subjects by England. He risked himself by visiting them in detention and visiting members of his community who were dispersed to find shelter.

After the passing of Rabbi Moshe Avigdor Amiel in 1945, Rabbi Unterman was appointed as the Ashkenazi rabbi of Tel Aviv. He refused to immigrate to Eretz Yisrael using the general immigration quota and instead received a special immigration permit from the British as a "British expert in the rabbinate."

In Tel Aviv, Rabbi Unterman established a kolel named "Shevet Meyehuda" and wrote halachic responses and various articles, compiling his main responses in his work: Shevet M'Yehuda. Together with the Sephardi rabbi of the city, Yaakov Moshe Toledano, he founded the special court for agunot issues.

Rabbi Unterman also served as a dayan in the Great Rabbinical Court. In 1955, he was elected to the Chief Rabbinate Council, and on Nisan 3, 5724 – March 16, 1964, he was elected as the Ashkenazi Chief Rabbi of Israel, defeating Rabbi Goren by three votes. Rabbi Unterman served in this position until 1972, when he lost the election to Rabbi Shlomo Goren, an outcome he interpreted as a dismissal.

Rabbi Unterman died in 1976 and was buried on the Mount of Olives in Jerusalem. Streets in Tel Aviv, Jerusalem, Petah Tikva, and Netanya are named after him.

He was married to Rachel Leah (née Yellin), and they had seven children. One of his sons, Baruch, served as a director at Bar-Ilan University. One of his granddaughters, Reva Mann, recalls his tolerance, saying that even though she did not observe Torah and mitzvot, her grandfather "loved her unconditionally."

== Halachic rulings and approach ==
Rabbi Unterman was a classic Litvak scholar deeply influenced by the unique halachic approach of his teacher, Rabbi Shimon Shkop, as reflected in his classes and halachic responses—discussions based on logical reasoning and the use of logical tools typical of his mentor. On the other hand, unlike Rabbi Shkop, Rabbi Unterman also addressed contemporary halachic issues of his time (many of which remain relevant today), such as: ascending the Temple Mount, conversion, marriage prohibitions, mitzvot dependent on the land, drafting women to the IDF, and many others.

Compared to other Orthodox rabbis of his time, Rabbi Unterman was considered a liberal posek. For example:

- When a woman offered her hand in greeting, Rabbi Unterman shook her hand, saying, "I am not lenient about touching, but I am strict about human dignity."
- Another example is his lenient approach toward accepting converts from the immigrants of the Soviet Union, about whom he wrote:
  There is room to be lenient in this difficult situation when it is impossible to prevent foreign immigrants from mixing among the children of Israel... One must act with these individuals needing conversion according to the law of the Torah, with sensitivity and understanding, taking into account the spiritual hardship these brothers of ours have endured.

Regarding new halachic issues concerning technological and scientific aspects, his approach tended to be lenient, for example, on organ donation. Initially, Rabbi Unterman (like most rabbis of his time) believed it was forbidden, but after it was proven that death could be determined scientifically and accurately, he permitted organ transplants and even introduced an argument to allow benefiting from a dead body, which remains used by contemporary halachic authorities. He also wrote in response to Rabbi Ketheriel Fishel Tikhuresh's article about the question posed by Bar-Ilan University on using embryonic stem cells:

I received your letter with a broad and detailed halachic discussion on the question of whether it is permissible to use tissue extracted by biopsy from stillborn fetuses, which never had independent life, for the purpose of treating children; from your words, I see that you consulted prominent rabbis who agreed to permit. Therefore, after examining the matter, I too agree to permit (emphasis in the original) conducting research using this material for the purpose of healing patients.

Rabbi Unterman supported the recitation of Hallel on Yom Ha'atzmaut, but since we do not have the authority that the sages had to establish new blessings, he hesitated about whether to recite the blessing before Hallel, invoking the name of God. On the other hand, on Jerusalem Day, Rabbi Unterman argued that Hallel should be recited with a blessing, as it is a celebration of a transition from death to life. Nevertheless, he asserted that Yom Ha'atzmaut takes precedence over Jerusalem Day because Yom Ha'atzmaut symbolizes human revival, while Jerusalem Day is a miracle of divine providence.

== Writings ==
- Shevet mi-Yehudah (1952) - on issues in halakhah

Jewish titles
Preceded by Yitzhak HaLevi Herzog	Ashkenazi Chief Rabbi of Israel; 1964–1972	Succeeded by Shlomo Goren
