= Gadol =

Most revered rabbis of the generation

Gadol or godol (Hebrew: גדול, lit. 'big, great'; plural: gedolim גדולים) is used by Haredi Jews to refer to the most revered rabbis and/or can be a rebbe of Hasidic Judaism.

== Usage ==
The term gadol hador refers to the "great/est of the generation", denoting a rebbe who is presumed to be even greater than the others. Other variations of the term are Gadol Yisrael or Gadol BeYisrael (plural: Gedolei Yisrael), meaning "great one of the Jewish people".

A similar title is Rashkebahag, which is an acronym for "Rabbon shel kol bnei hagolah" "sage and teacher of the entire Diaspora". Another term is Manhig Yisroel (plural: Manhigei Yisroel), literally "leader of the Jewish people".

The title gadol hador is usually only given to one sage at a time, while the title "Rashkebahag" can be given to a few, and the term Gedolei Yisrael collectively refers to all leading rabbis in the Haredi community.

The term is generally applied to leaders since World War I. Major rabbis from earlier generations are known as Rishonim or Achronim.

== Role ==
Often, a gadol functions as a rosh yeshiva. A gadol is quite often also a posek (a decisor of halakha) and may be the author of rabbinic literature and responsa.

Adherents of Haredi Judaism often presume that a gadol has some degree of ruach hakodesh ("divine spirit"); the gadol's teachings and statements therefore become the crux of rabbinic authority.

According to Nota Greenblatt, posek and rosh yeshiva of Margolin Hebrew Academy, a true gadol is far more than a great Talmid Chakham; he is someone that has wisdom, concern for others, and has fully developed his middos.

Rabbi Chaim Epstein has been quoted as saying:

We do not vote for gedolim. We know someone is a gadol if he is accepted by the Torah world, if he is accepted by the lomdei Torah.

== Related concepts ==
In Hebrew halachic texts, gadol is also used as a term for a Jewish boy who turns thirteen, and is viewed as an adult regarding to his obligation to practice the 613 commandments. This is the age of bnei mitzvah. When a Jewish girl reaches the age of twelve, according to Jewish law, she is called a gedolah (the feminine form of gadol).

Kohen Gadol refers to the High Priest of Israel in the time of the Temple in Jerusalem. Shabbat Hagadol is the Shabbat prior to Passover.

In modern Hebrew, "gadol" is used as slang to mean something is extremely cool, out of this world, superb, awesome, absurdly funny, or hilarious. For example, upon hearing a funny joke one might interject "Gadol!"

In English writing, the transliterated word "gadol" generally refers to a prominent rabbi.

== Recognized gedolei hador ==
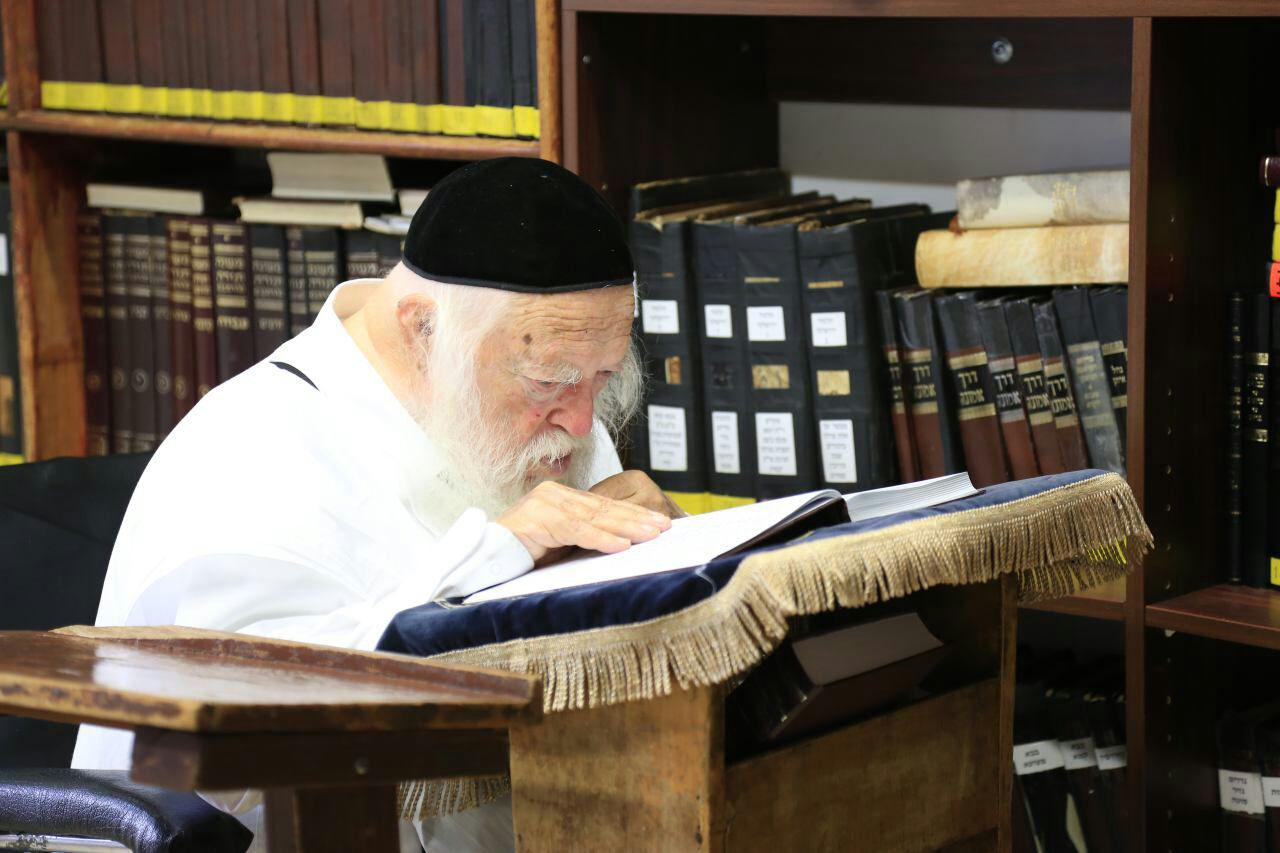
Chaim Kanievsky

The following are names of rabbis of the non-Hasidic communities that were or are widely recognized to be the gadol hador:

=== Haredi ===
- Vilna Gaon
- Rabbi Chaim of Volozhin
- Rabbi Yosef Dov Soloveitchik (Beis Halevi)
- Rabbi Akiva Eger
- Rabbi Moses Sofer (Chasam Sofer)
- Rabbi Chaim Soloveitchik (Chaim Brisker)
- Rabbi Yitzchak Elchanan Spektor
- Rabbi Yisrael Meir Kagan (the Chofetz Chaim)
- Rabbi Aharon Kotler
- Rabbi Chaim Ozer Grodzinski
- Rabbi Avrohom Yeshaya Karelitz (the Chazon Ish)
- Rabbi Yosef Eliyahu Henkin
- Rabbi Yaakov Kamenetsky
- Rabbi Moshe Feinstein
- Rabbi Shlomo Zalman Auerbach
- Rabbi Yitzchak Hutner
- Rabbi Elazar Shach
- Rabbi Yosef Shalom Elyashiv
- Rabbi Ovadia Yosef
- Rabbi Nosson Tzvi Finkel
- Rabbi Chaim Pinchas Scheinberg
- Rabbi Aharon Leib Shteinman
- Rabbi Chaim Kanievsky
- Rabbi Gershon Edelstein
- Rabbi Dov Lando
- Rabbi Moshe Hillel Hirsch
- Rabbi Avigdor Nebenzahl

=== Modern Orthodox/Religious Zionist ===
- Rabbi Abraham Isaac Kook
- Rabbi Joseph B. Soloveitchik ("the Rav")
- Rabbi Aharon Lichtenstein
- Rabbi Jonathan Sacks

== See also ==
- Gedolim pictures
