= Ephraim Greenblatt =

Ephraim Greenblatt (1932–2014) was a rabbi and halachic authority in the United States, and at the end of his life in Jerusalem. He was famous for his many halachic answers and is considered a leading disciple of Moshe Feinstein.

== Biography ==
Greenblatt was born in Jerusalem in 1932 to Rabbi Avraham Baruch and Aliza Greenblatt, the oldest of eleven children. His grandfathers were Yitzchak Greenblatt and Chanoch Birenstock. The former was from Brisk and the latter from Łódź. During his youth in Israel he was member of the Jewish paramilitary organization Lehi.

Poverty, being the oldest of 11 children, and a suggestion from his paternal grandfather brought him to America and Moshe Feinstein's Mesivtha Tifereth Jerusalem; Greenblatt is considered a Talmid Muvhak of Rav Feinstein. During this time he also concurrently served as rabbi of a small congregation.

In 1952, when Feinstein was asked by the Memphis community to provide someone to help strengthen their community, Greenblatt was sent. He served there for 58 years as a local rabbi, Av Beit Din, Rosh Yeshiva, Rosh Kollel, educator, shochet and mohel, at which point he returned to Israel, three years before his death. His return to Israel was caused, at least in part, due to being defrauded by Bernie Madoff.

== Family ==
His wife Miriam died in 2002. They are survived by two sons, both rabbis, and three daughters. He saw grandchildren and great-grandchildren.

== Works ==
- Shailos Uteshuvos Rivevos Ephraim (10 volumes, on Halacha)
- Rivevos Ephraim Al Hatorah (2 volumes)
- Revivos V’Yovlos (also 2 volumes)
- and numerous teshuvos and articles published in Torah journals and other publications

== See also ==
- Baron Hirsch Synagogue
- Anshei Sphard Beth El Emeth Congregation
