= Gedolim pictures =

Pictures of the leading Orthodox Jewish rabbis

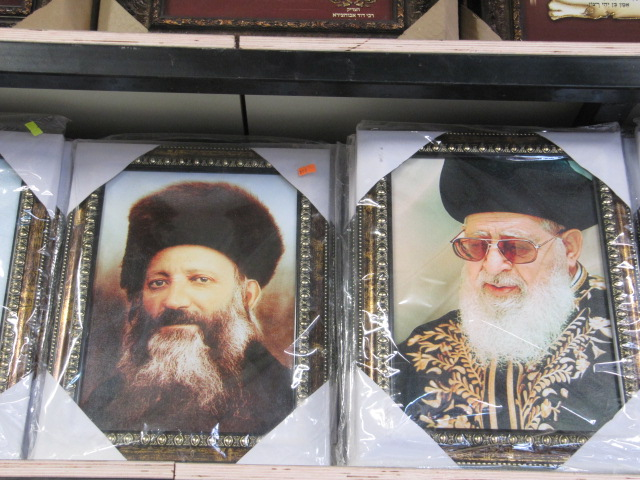
Gedolim pictures in Israel

Gedolim pictures are photos or sketches of (or attributed to) famous rabbis, known as gedolim (Hebrew for "great people"), who are admired by Jews.

It is a cultural phenomenon found largely in the Orthodox and more specifically Haredi Jewish communities. Gedolim pictures are pictures of famous rabbis and other prominent Jews which are circulated amongst the Jewish communities. Quite frequently, these pictures are posted on the walls of offices, businesses, houses, and schools where Jews are present.

Collecting Gedolim pictures has developed into a hobby for many Jewish children around the world; it is similar to collecting sports cards.

Tsemach Glenn, Matis Goldberg, Avraham Elbaz, Chaim L. Friedman, and Yaakov Biderman, are renowned in the Jewish community for their photography of Gedolim. Elazar Kalman Tiefenbrun (aka E.K. Tiefenbrun), a Chabad painter, is renowned for his numerous paintings of Gedolim, specifically, but not exclusively, of Lubavitcher Rebbes.

== Books ==
In recent years, several books, dedicated to their display of gedolim pictures, have been published.

- Golberg, Matis (2007). Gedolei Yisroel: Portraits of Greatness. ISBN 9781583309315.
- Golberg, Matis (2014). Gedolei Yisroel: Portraits of Majesty. M.Y. Goldberg. ISBN 9781598269994.
- Golberg, Matis (2019). Gedolei Yisroel: Portraits of Leadership. Ha-meḥaber. ISBN 9781680253900.
- Golberg, Matis (2010). The Gedolei Yisroel Album: Portraits, Pictures, and Personalities. Feldheim. ISBN 9781598264999.
- Bamberger, Rabbi Moshe (2019). Great Jewish Photographs. 100 Classic and Inspirational Images of Torah Personalities. Mesorah Publications, Ltd. ISBN 9781422623145.

== Examples ==
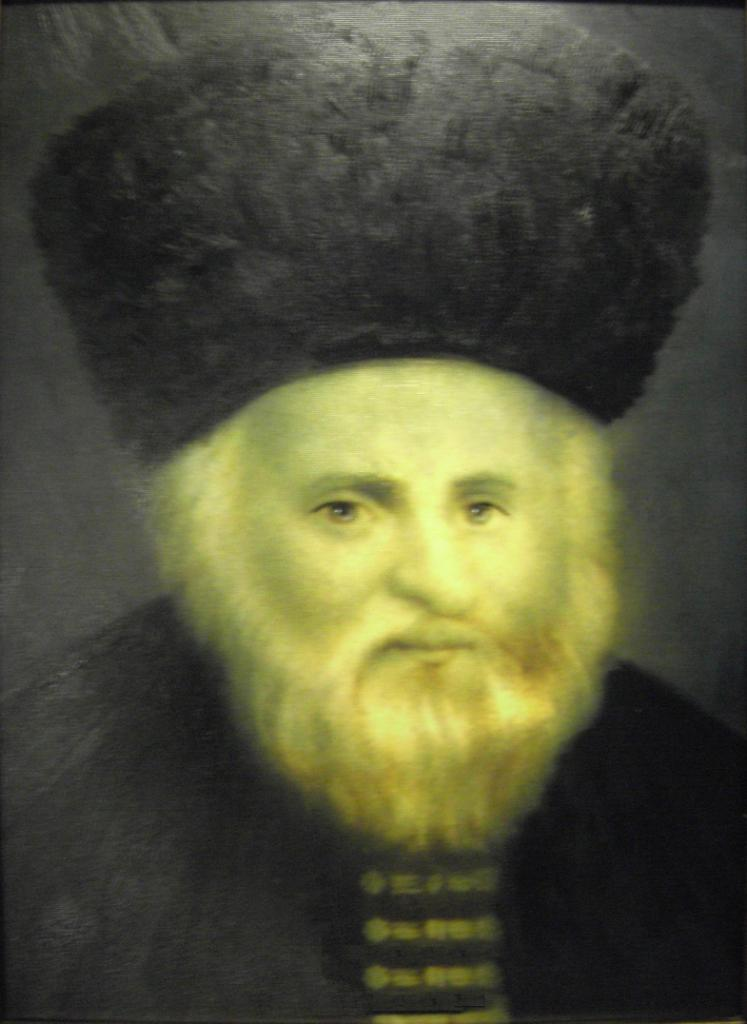
Vilna Gaon

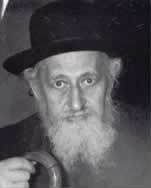
Yitzchok Zev Soloveitchik

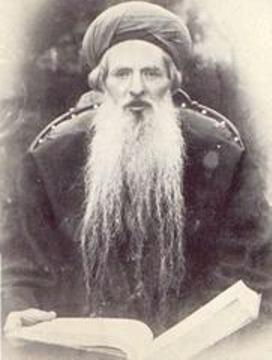
Chaim Hezekiah Medini

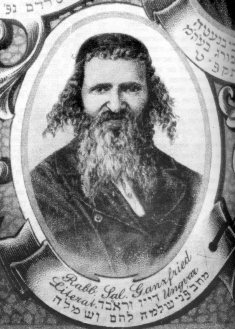
Rabbi Shlomo Ganzfried

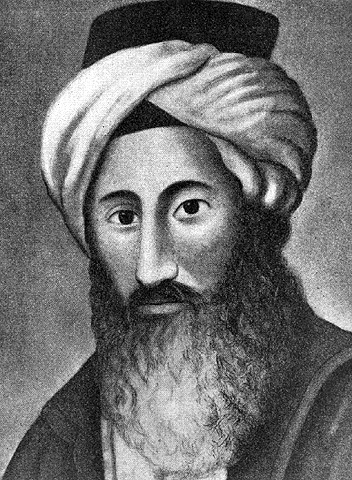
Chaim Yosef David Azulai

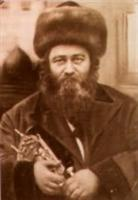
Meir Shapiro

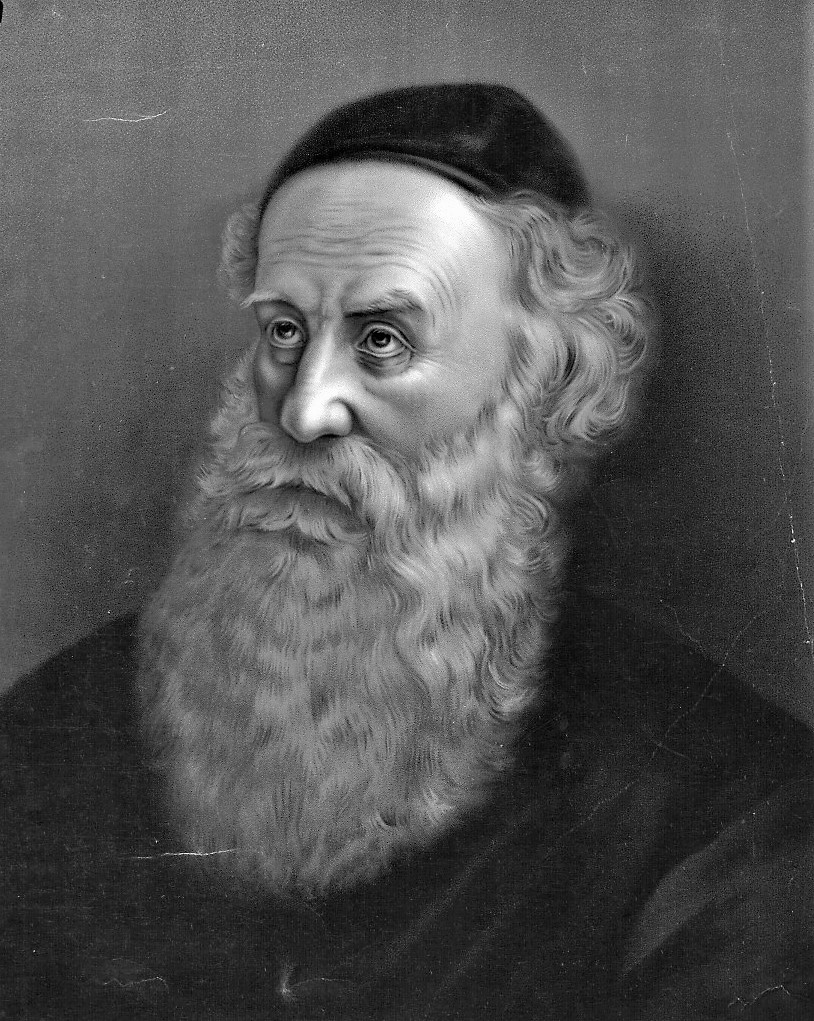
Shneur Zalman of Liadi

Yaakov Yisrael Kanievsky

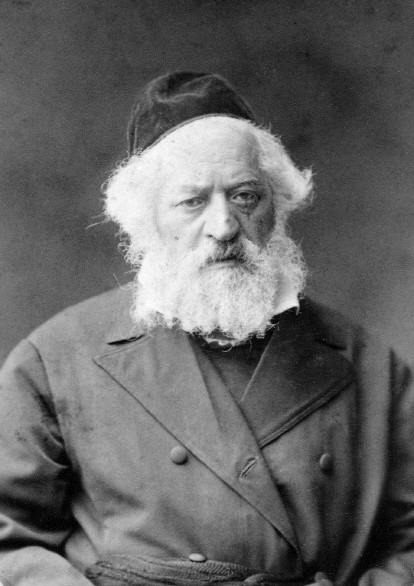
Kovner Rov

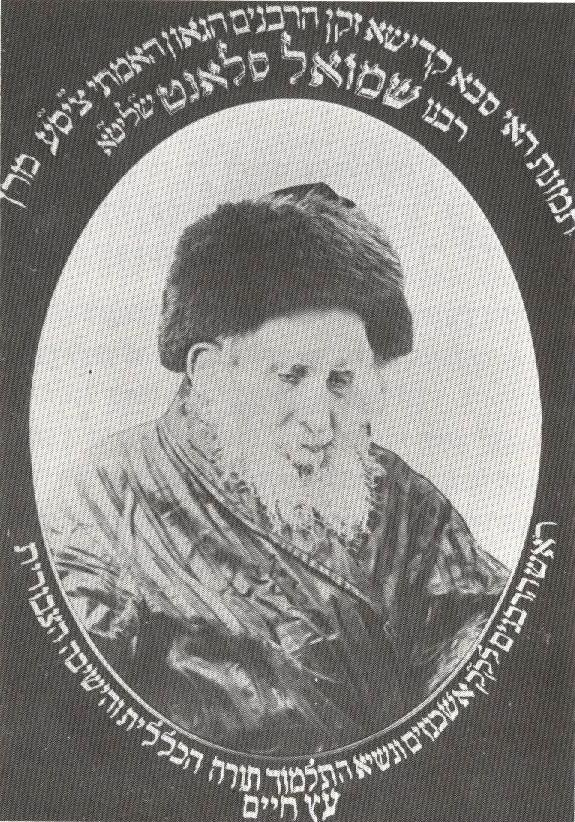
Shmuel Salant

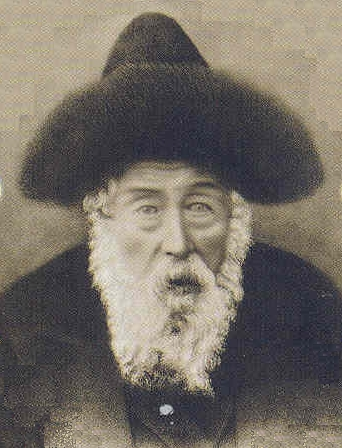
Avraham Mattisyahu Friedman

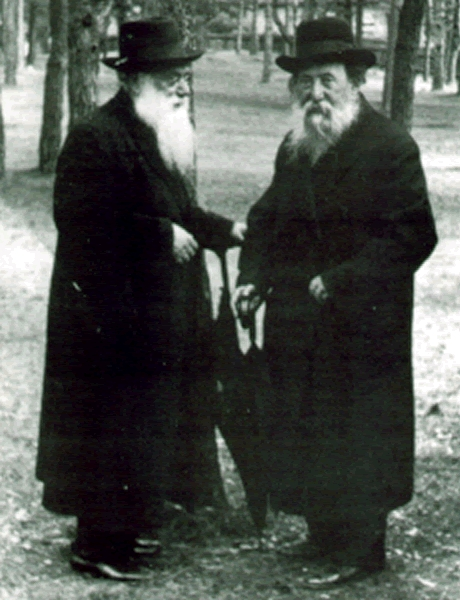
Chaim Ozer Grodzinski

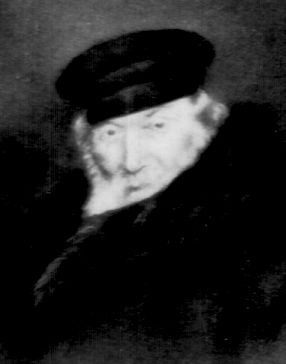
Yisrael Meir Kagan

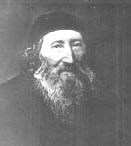
Zvi Hirsch Kalischer

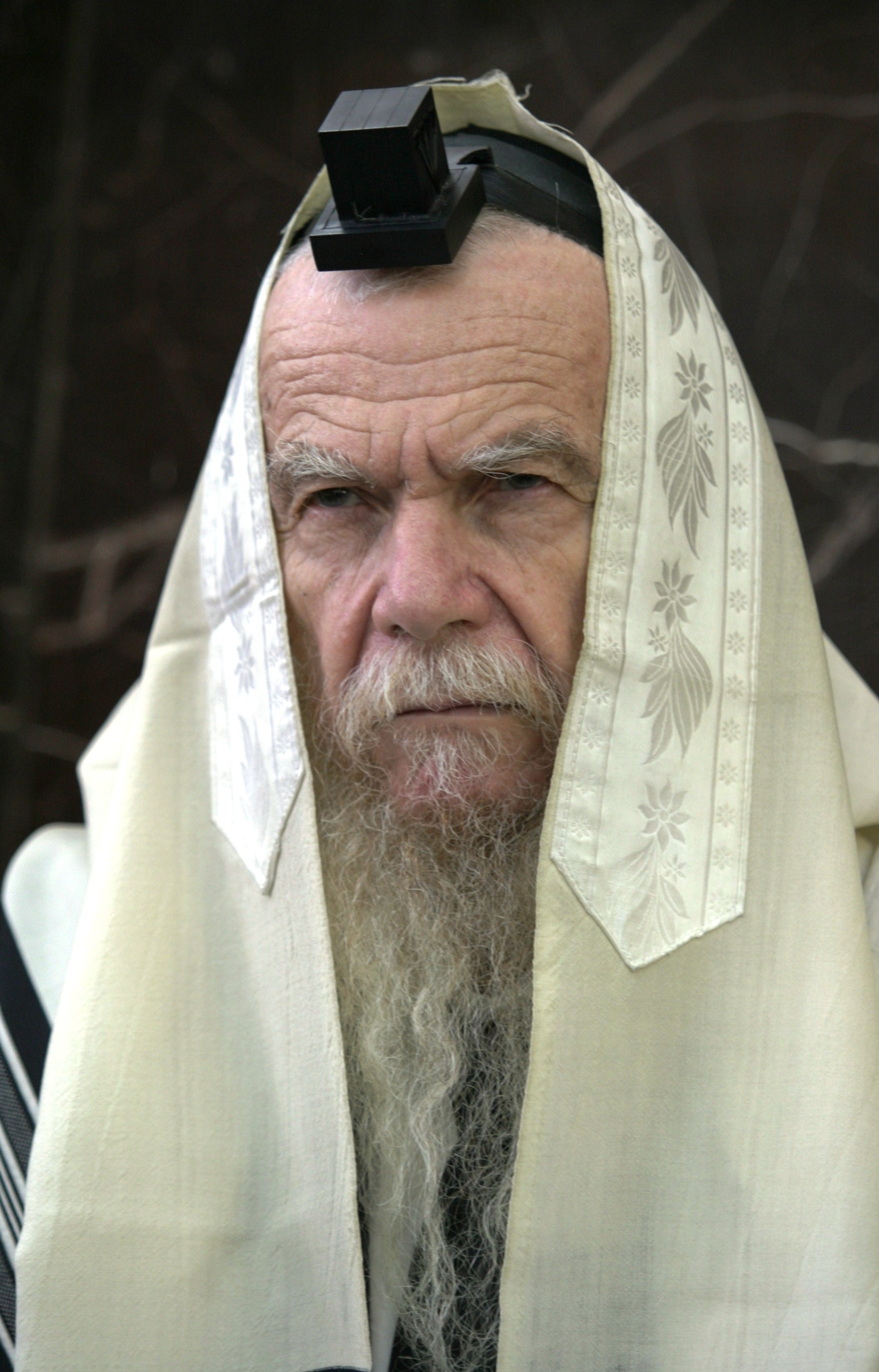
Gershon Edelstein

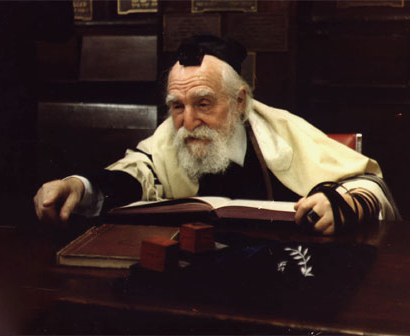
Moshe Feinstein

== See also ==
- Category:Images of Haredi rabbis
- Category:Images of Hasidic rebbes
