= Sosny 2 =

Agrotown in Minsk Region, Belarus

Sosny 2 Сосны 2
- Agrotown
- Location within Belarus
- Coordinates: 52°40′09″N 28°14′58″E
- Country: Belarus
- Region: Minsk Region
- District: Lyuban District

Population (2011)
  - Total: 677
- Time zone: UTC+3 (MSK)

Sosny 2 (Belarusian: Сосны 2; Russian: Сосны 2), previously known as Sosny until 2013, is an agrotown in Lyuban District, Minsk Region, Belarus. It serves as the administrative center of Sosny rural council. It is located 25 kilometres (16 mi) from Lyuban, 41 kilometres (25 mi) from Urechcha, and 177 kilometres (110 mi) from the capital Minsk. In 2001, it had a population of 772. In 2011, it had a population of 677.
