= Reuven Feinstein =

American rabbi (born 1937)

Rabbi Reuven Feinstein
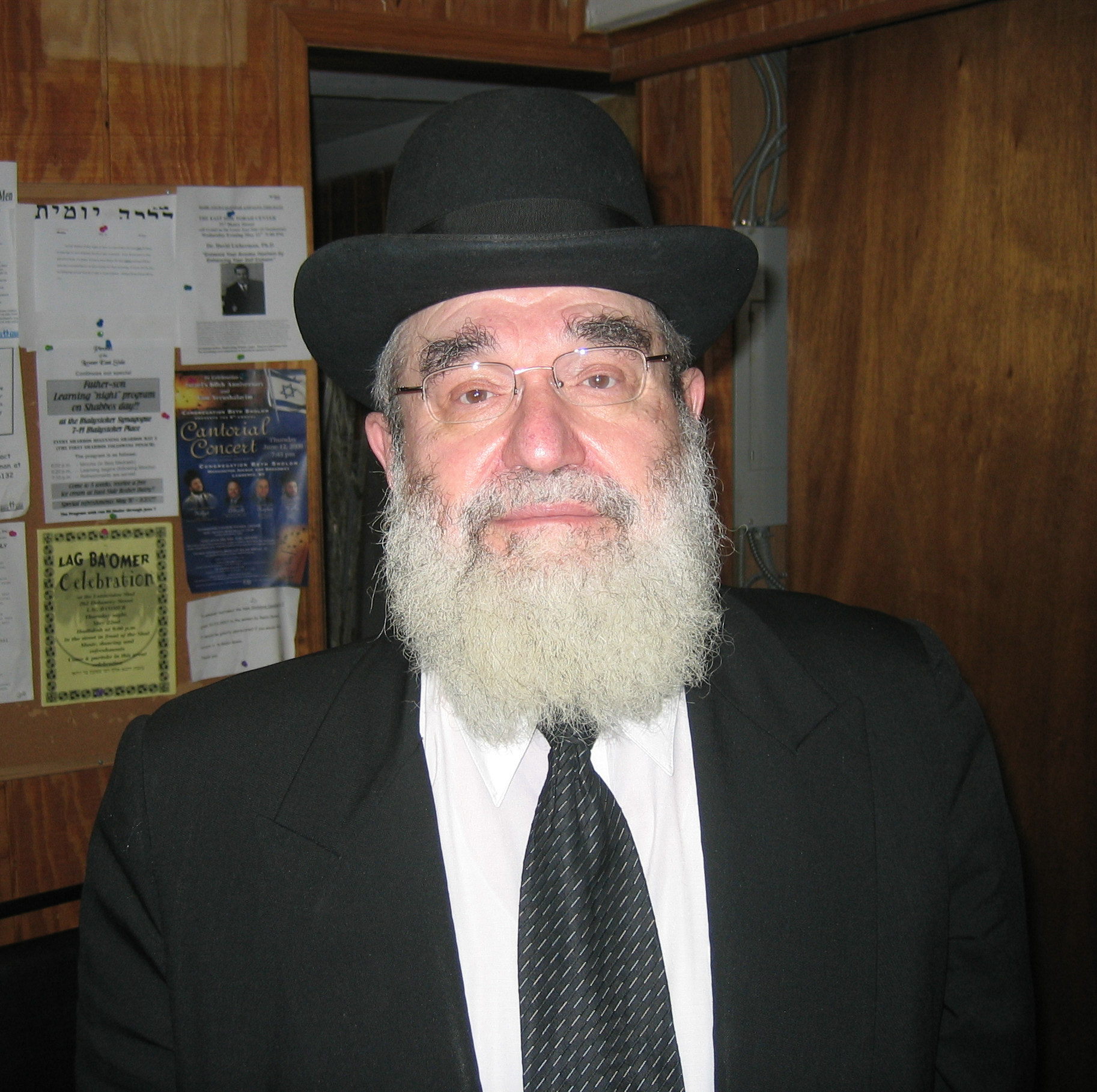
- Rabbi Reuven Feinstein

Personal life
- Born: Reuven Feinstein
- Spouse: Shelia (deceased)
- Parent(s): Moshe Feinstein and Shima Kustanovich
- Occupation: Rosh yeshiva

Religious life
- Religion: Judaism
- Yeshiva: Yeshiva of Staten Island
- Position: Rosh yeshiva
- Residence: Staten Island

Sholom Reuven Feinstein (Hebrew: שלום ראובן פיינשטיין; born August 1937) is an Orthodox Jewish rabbi and rosh yeshiva of the Yeshiva of Staten Island, New York. He is the younger of Rabbi Moshe Feinstein's two sons, the leading posek of post-war America.

== Biography ==
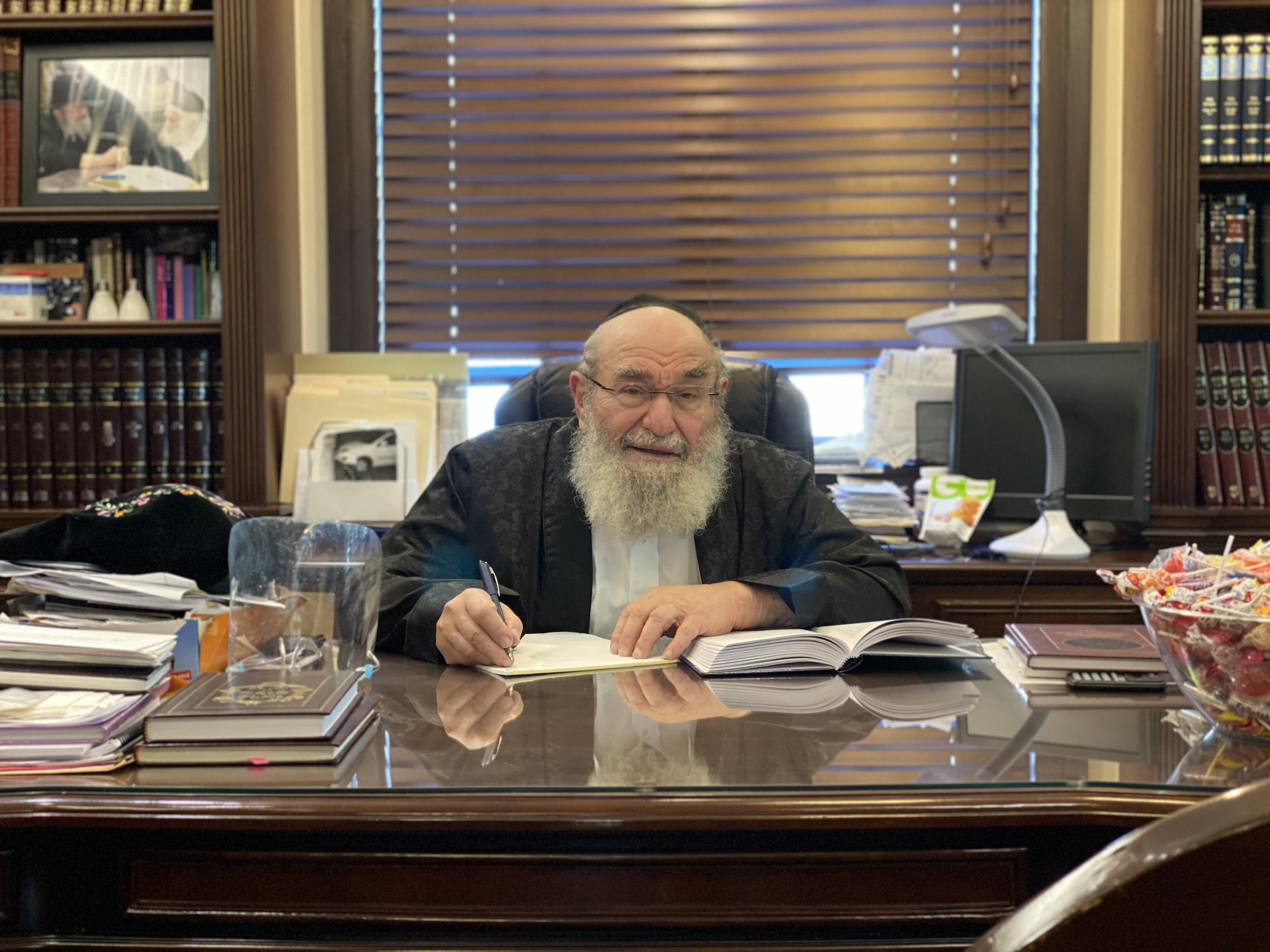
Rabbi Reuven Feinstein, at his desk

Reuven Feinstein is the youngest of the four children of Rabbi Moshe and Shima (Sima) Feinstein and the only one to be born in America. His older siblings — Faye Gittel (deceased), Shifra (deceased), and Dovid (deceased) were all born in Lyuban, Russia (now part of Belarus), where Rabbi Moshe was the city's Rav until 1937.

Feinstein joined his father in establishing the Yeshiva of Staten Island in 1966. He has served as Rosh Yeshiva (head of school) of the yeshiva ever since. As did his late brother Dovid Feinstein, he upholds their late father's stance against an eruv for Manhattan.

== Personal life ==
Rabbi Feinstein married Sheila (Chava Sara) Kaplan in the early 1960s. They had four children. She was a public school teacher, then a public school principal, and later on principal of secular studies at a girl's yeshiva. On July 24, 2018, they were involved in a car accident, from which she died on August 8.

== Societal Contributions ==
In addition to meeting with visitors and handling phone inquiries, Rabbi Feinstein is involved in teaching and providing assistance to members of the broader community.

He authored numerous works on various subjects within Torah literature.

They include:

- "Nahar Sholom on the Torah" (in English)
- "פרקי שלום" on Pirkei Avos (in Hebrew)
- "Pirkei Sholom" on Pirkei Avos (in English)
- "Divrei Sholom" on Emunah (in English)
- "Reb Reuven Feinstein on the Haggadah" (in English)

He gives shiurim (classes) regularly including a popular weekly Chumash Shiur which gets live streamed via https://www.DarcheiSholom.com.

He founded and spearheads numerous organizations including Yeshiva of Staten Island and Chasdei Lev.

He sits on the boards of many organizations and institutions, including:

- Mesivtha Tifereth Jerusalem
- Chasdei Lev
- Artscroll
- Shuvu Chazon Avrohom
- Yeshiva Gedola of Carteret
- Among numerous others...
