= David Feinstein =

David Feinstein may refer to:

- Rabbi Dovid Feinstein
- David "Rock" Feinstein, guitarist in the bands Elf and The Rods
- David Feinstein, clinical psychologist and proponent of Emotional Freedom Techniques
