= Nota Greenblatt =

American rabbi (1925-2022)

Rabbi Nota Greenblatt
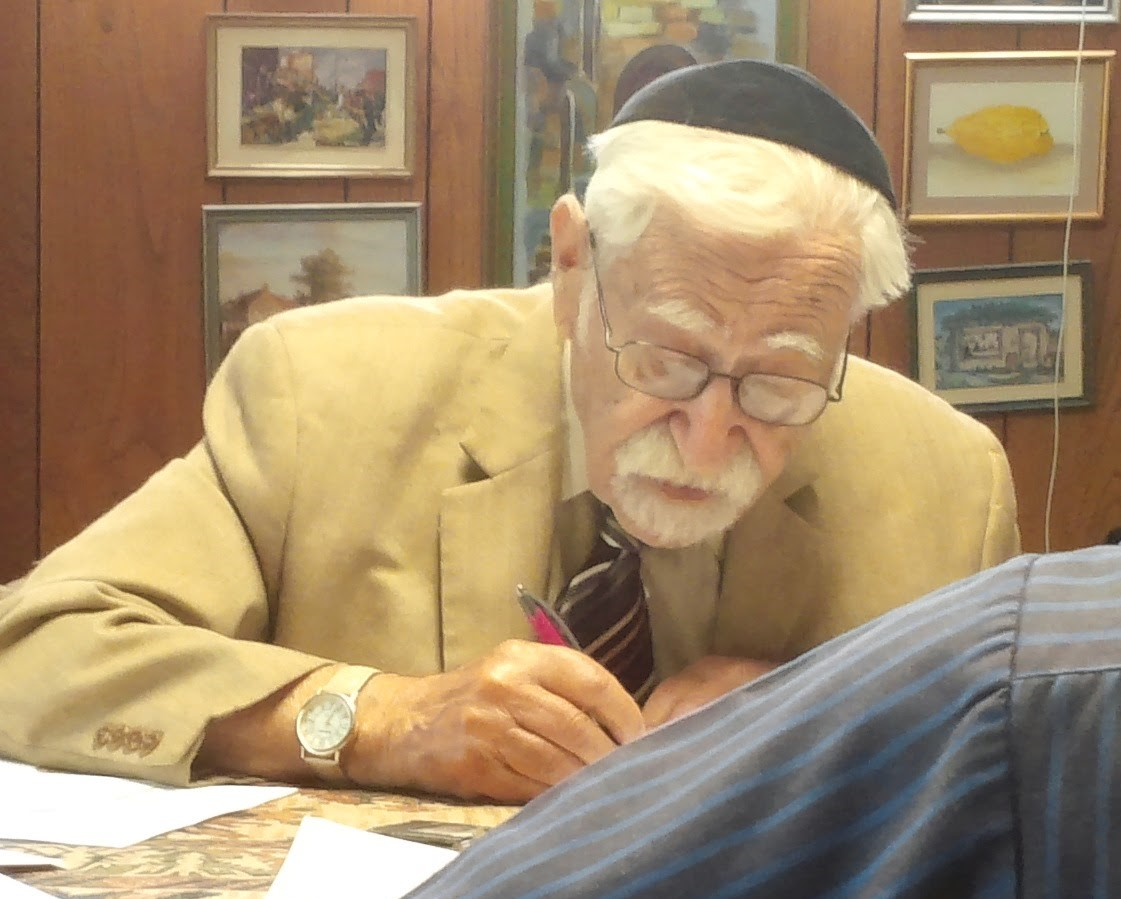
- Greenblatt in 2017

Personal life
- Born: 1925
- Died: April 29, 2022 (aged 97) New York City, U.S.
- Spouse: Miriam Kaplan
- Children: 5
- Parent: Yitzchak Greenblatt
- Education: Yeshivas Chofetz Chaim, Mesivta Tiferes Yerushalayim
- Occupation: Rabbi, Misader Gittin

Religious life
- Religion: Judaism
- Denomination: Orthodox

Jewish leader
- Position: Leader of Vaad Hakehilloth of Memphis
- Main work: K'Reiach Sadeh (1999)
- Other: Co-founder of the Margolin Hebrew Academy, Siddur Gittin

Nota Greenblatt (1925 - April 29, 2022) was a rabbi who was a misader gittin (Jewish divorce supervisor), co-founder of the Margolin Hebrew Academy in Memphis, Tennessee, and the leader of the Vaad Hakehilloth of Memphis, a kosher certification agency.

== Education ==
Harav Greenblatt was born to a family with strong roots in the Brisk tradition and Soloveitchik dynasty, his father Rabbi Yitzchak Greenblatt being close with rabbis Chaim Soloveitchik and his son Yitzchok Zev Soloveitchik. After spending most of his childhood in British Mandate Palestine, Rav Greenblatt and his family moved back to the US when he was 13, where he enrolled in Yeshivas Chofetz Chaim under Rabbi Dovid Leibowitz.

At the age of 16 Rav Greenblatt studied under Rabbis Yechiel Michel Feinstein and Joseph B. Soloveitchik in the short-lived Heichal Rabbeinu Chaim HaLevi in Boston. At the age of 17, Greenblatt enrolled in the Yeshiva of Rabbi Moshe Feinstein, Mesivta Tiferes Yerushalayim, where he became a very close student of Rabbi Feinstein.

Rav Greenblatt went to Palestine in 1946 to study under the Brisker Rav, and while there found study partners in Rabbi Aharon Cohen, the Rosh Yeshiva (dean) of Hebron Yeshiva, and Rabbi Moshe Leib Shachor. He also talked in learning regularly with Rabbi Isser Zalman Meltzer and the Imrei Emes of Gur. After serving a brief stint fighting for the Israel Defense Forces in Israel's War of Independence, Harav Greenblatt returned to America in 1948 with his ailing father.

== Memphis Hebrew Academy ==
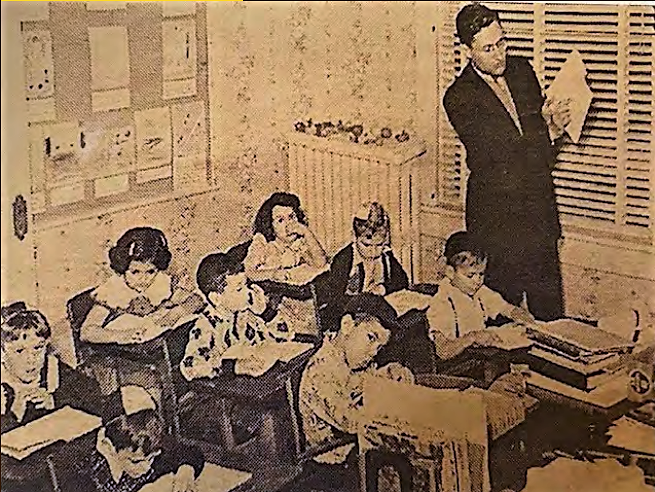
Greenblatt, 1949, Memphis Hebrew Academy

Rav Greenblatt moved to Memphis, Tennessee, where he became the cantor at a local synagogue and teacher in the local Talmud Torah school. In September 1949 he and local resident Seymour Kutner, opened a school of 38 children for kindergarten and first grade, where he was an unpaid teacher. The school later became the K-12 institution known as the Margolin Hebrew Academy.

== Siddur Gittin ==
While in Memphis he began supervising Jewish divorces (gittin), travelling internationally in the work.

In 2015 Rav Greenblatt permitted a woman to remarry despite never receiving a get from her previous husband in a controversial decision.

== Work ==
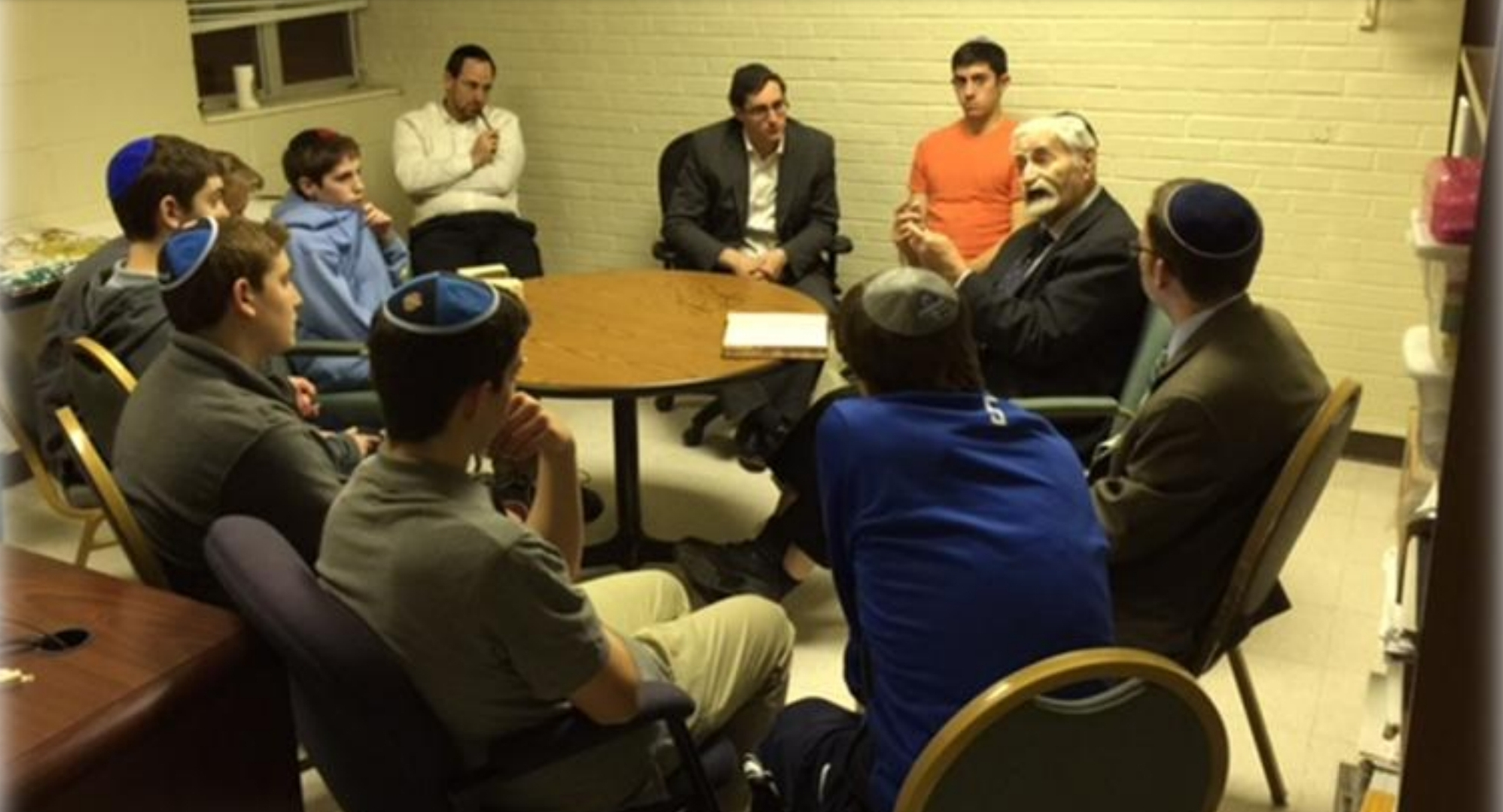
Greenblatt at Cooper Yeshiva HS in Memphis in 2014.

He published one book in his lifetime, K'Reiach Sadeh (1999). While based on Chumash and Rashi, it is multifaceted, and deals with Targum Onkeles and Talmudic topics, focusing particularly on Kodshim and the Rambam's approach.

== Personal life and death ==
He and his wife Miriam Kaplan had five children together. He died in New York on April 29, 2022.
