= Blumenkrantz =

Blumenkrantz is a German and Ashkenazi Jewish surname meaning "flower-wreath". Notable people with the surname include:

- Avrohom Blumenkrantz (1944–2007), American rabbi
- Jeff Blumenkrantz (born 1965), American composer
