= Kamunarawski, Lyuban district rural council =

Kamunarawski rural council is a lower-level subdivision (selsoviet) of Lyuban district, Minsk region, Belarus.
