= Urechcha rural council =

Urechcha rural council is a lower-level subdivision (selsoviet) of Lyuban district, Minsk region, Belarus.
