= Sarachy, Lyuban district rural council =

Sarachy rural council is a lower-level subdivision (selsoviet) of Lyuban district, Minsk region, Belarus.
