= Sosny rural council =

Coordinates: 52°40′09″N 28°14′58″E

Sosny rural council is a lower-level subdivision (selsoviet) of Lyuban district, Minsk region, Belarus. Its administrative center is the agrotown Sosny 2.
