= Asavyets, Lyuban district rural council =

Asavyets rural council is a lower-level subdivision (selsoviet) of Lyuban district, Minsk region, Belarus. Its center is in Asavyets, Asavyets selsoviet, Lyuban district

== Rural localities ==
The populations are from the 2009 Belarusian census and 2019 Belarusian census

Populations of rural localities in 2009 and 2019
Russian name	Belarusian name	Pop. 2009	Pop. 2019
Осовецкий сельсовет	Асавецкі сельсавет	2738	1890
д Заельное	в Заельнае	59	27
д Зеленки	в Зялёнкі	175	130
д Костеши	в Касцяшы	93	42
д Криваль	в Крываль	9	2
д Навгольное	в Наўгальнае	7	9
д Озломль	в Азломль	53	15
аг Осовец	аг Асавец	871	777
д Пекличи	в Пеклічы	136	87
д Переспа	в Пярэспа	11	8
д Пласток	в Пласток	352	220
д Плюсна	в Плюсна	33	18
д Тройчаны	в Трайчаны	264	121
д Трубятино	в Трубяціна	36	28
д Чабусы	в Чабусы	120	79
д Яминск	в Ямінск	519	327
