= Rakhel Feygenberg =

Hebrew and Yiddish writer (1885–1972)

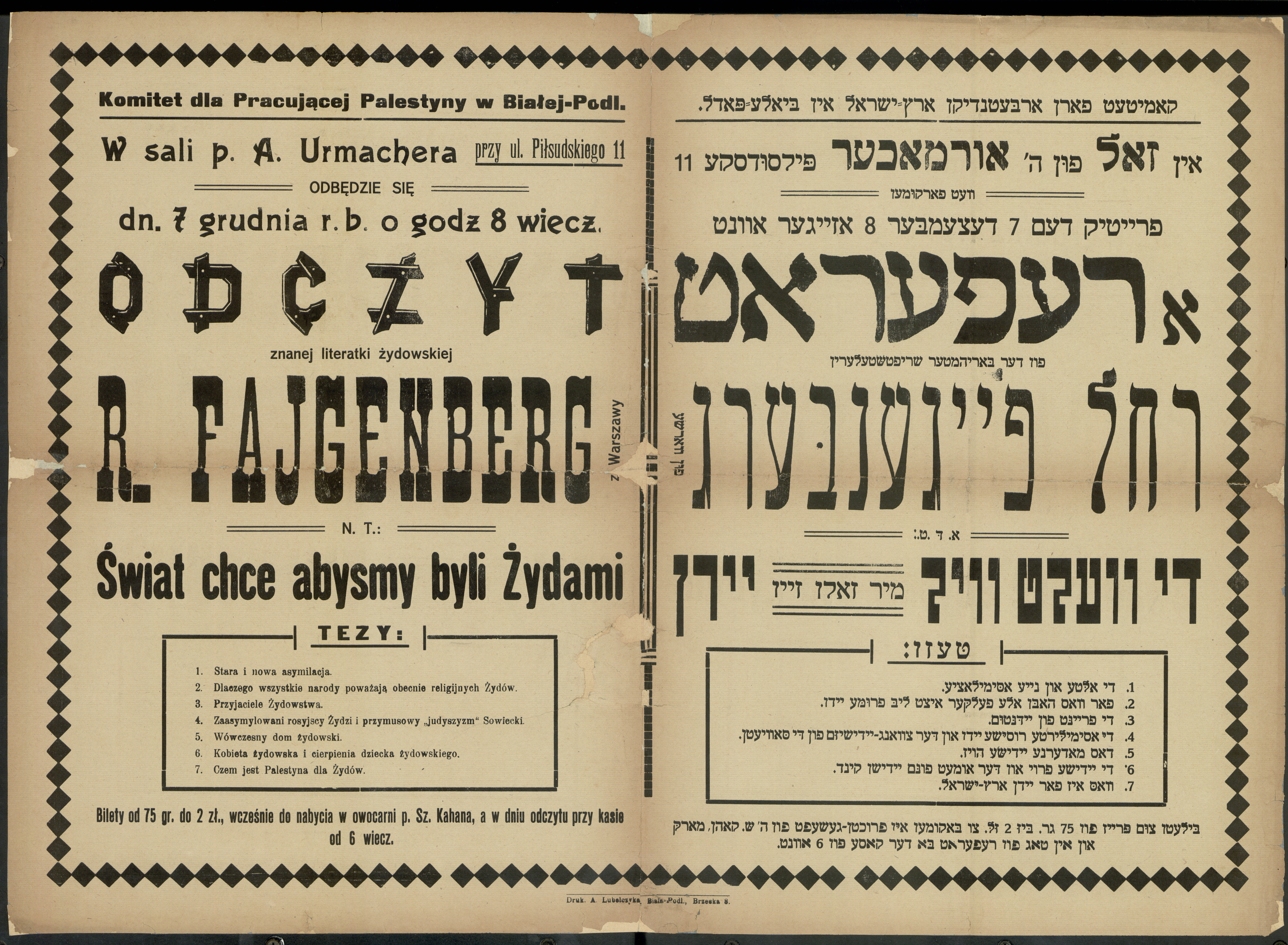
poster for a Rokhl Feygenberg lecture

Rakhel Feygenberg (Yiddish: רחל פײגענבערג; 1885–1972), often known by her Hebrew pen name Rakhel Imri (רחל אמרי), was a Russian-born Israeli writer, playwright, translator and journalist who wrote in both Yiddish and Hebrew. She wrote and published prolifically from the early 1900s to the 1960s.

== Biography ==
=== Early life ===
Feygenberg was born in Lyuban, Minsk Governorate, Russian Empire (now Belarus), in 1885. Her father Ber, who was the son of the rabbi of Lyuban, died when she was four years old. She received an education in Hebrew, Russian and Yiddish from her grandfather, the rabbi, as well as her mother Soreh Epstein, who was the niece of the writer Zalmen Epstein, and from private tutors in the town. She wrote her first novel, titled Yosef un Roze, at age 13 but was forced to burn it by her relatives. In her teenage years she was brought to Odessa by her grandmother, and lived with relatives while working in a clothing store for four years. It was in 1905, during this period, that she published her first piece, a short story named Kinder yohren (childhood years) which appeared in the literary magazine Dos lebn. The writer Shaul Ginzberg, who had published her piece, was impressed by her and helped her move to Saint Petersburg where she obtained a teacher's certificate. She also enrolled in literary studies in Saint Petersburg but dropped out when she lacked money for the tuition. She then relocated to Lausanne, Switzerland, and enrolled in literature courses, but once again had to abandon her studies due to lack of money. She continued to write and publish short stories and novels during this time. She returned to Russia and worked as a teacher in the Volhynian Governorate for a few years. She married a chemist and family friend named G. Shapiro, who was much older than her, in 1914; they settled in Yanovka (today Bereslavka, Ukraine) and had a son. She stopped writing for the first five years they were married. In 1919, during the Russian Civil War her house was destroyed in a pogrom, and she and her son hid among non-Jews.

=== Writing career ===
Later in 1919 Feygenberg returned to Odessa and began to write and publish again. In particular, she focused on writing about the anti-Jewish pogroms she had lived through, and participated in efforts to collect testimonials from survivors. She left Ukraine in 1921 and spent time in Chișinău and Bucharest. In the mid-1920s she lived in various places, including Mandatory Palestine, Warsaw, and Paris. During her time in Palestine, she accused the literary establishment there of discriminating against Yiddish, as they translated many of the lowest-quality European novels into Hebrew but almost never works originally written in Yiddish.

She permanently left Europe for Mandatory Palestine in 1933, where she settled in Tel Aviv and began to publish under the pen name Rakhel Imri. She worked as a correspondent for Der Moment and for various Hebrew-language publications such as Haaretz, Davar, HaOlam HaZeh and Kuntres. During this era, she began to believe that Yiddish writers should live in the Soviet Union and that writers in Mandatory Palestine should focus on Hebrew-language writing. She began to support the translation of some of the best Yiddish works into Hebrew, publishing translations of the works of Israel Joshua Singer and David Bergelson in Hebrew. She also began to translate her own Yiddish-language works into Hebrew. Over time, and especially after the Holocaust, she lost her faith that Yiddish and Hebrew language literatures would continue to be equally vital, and focused more strongly on translation into Hebrew.

Feygenberg died in Tel Aviv in 1972.

== Selected works ==
=== Works in Yiddish ===
- Di kinder-yorn (Childhood, Warsaw: 1909)
- A mame (A mother, Warsaw: 1911)
- Tekhter (Daughters, serialized in Moment, 1913)
- Af fremde vegn (On Foreign Paths, Warsaw: 1925) Translated in English as Strange Ways (Jerusalem, 2007).
- Bay di bregn fun Dniester (On the Banks of the Dniester, Warsaw: 1925)
- A pinkes fun a toyter shtot: Khurbn Dubove (Record Book of a Dead City: The Destruction of Dubove, Warsaw: 1926). (French translation. Paris: 1926)
- Heyrat af tsvey yor (Marriage for Two Years, Warsaw: 1932)
- Di velt vil mir zoln zayn Yidn (The World Wants Us To Be Jews, Warsaw: 1936)

=== Works in Hebrew ===
- Le-Shnatayyim: Roman Beli Ahavah (For Two Years: A Love Story without Love, Berlin: 1929)
- Be-Darkhei Nekhar (On Foreign Paths, Tel Aviv: 1938.) Translation of Af fremde vegn.
- Be-Mevukhat ha-Yamim (In the Confusion of the Days, Tel Aviv: 1938)
- Neshei ha-Hayal Shel ha-Dor ha-Yashan (The Wives of the Soldiers of the Old Generation, 1938)
- Megillat Dubovah (The Scroll of Dubove, Tel Aviv: 1940) Translation of A pinkes fun a toyter shtot.
- Bonei ha-Moledet (Builders of the Homeland, Jerusalem: 1941)
- Mi-Bein Gidrei ha-Tayil (Between Barbed Wire Fences, 1947/1948)
- Megillot Yehudei Rusia, Tarsa-Tashkad (The Scrolls of the Jews of Russia, 1905–1964, 5 volumes, Jerusalem: 1965)
