= Avrohom Blumenkrantz =

American rabbi

- Rabbi Blumenkrantz drafting a ketubah at a wedding

Rabbi of Far Rockaway, Queens

Personal life
- Born: אברהם בלומענקראנץ; October 21, 1944 Mandatory Palestine
- Died: February 22, 2007 (aged 62) New York City, U.S.
- Spouse: Shaindel (née Braunstein)
- Children: 15
- Education: Mesivtha Tifereth Jerusalem
- Occupation: Rabbi, Halakhic authority

Religious life
- Religion: Judaism
- Denomination: Orthodox

Avrohom Blumenkrantz (October 21 1944 – February 22, 2007) (Yiddish: אברהם בלומענקראנץ) was a prominent American Orthodox rabbi. He was a widely consulted authority on the laws of Passover kashrut and published an annual Passover guide for many years.

== Early life ==
Avrohom Blumenkrantz was born in Mandatory Palestine to parents of Ashkenazi European extraction, Chaim Menachem Bentzion and Devorah. His father was a highly trained talmudic scholar from Warsaw, who attended some of the best yeshivas in pre-war Europe, including the Novardok yeshiva. In 1948, Chaim was abroad at the outbreak of the War of Independence, and chose not to return. Instead, young Avrohom and the rest of the family left Israel aboard a ship. In the early 1950s the family settled in Bogotá, Colombia, where Chaim became chief rabbi.

Avrohom began his education in Bogotá, but came to New York City as a teenager to study at Mesivtha Tifereth Jerusalem (MTJ) under Moshe Feinstein, with whom Blumenkrantz would maintain a close relationship until Feinstein's death in 1986.

== Rabbinical career ==
Blumenkrantz became a confidant of Feinstein, screening his calls and filtering the constant stream of halakhic (Jewish law) questions posed to the posek. Feinstein asked his 25-year-old student to teach a semikhah (rabbinic ordination) class in Yoreh De'ah at MTJ. Afterwards, Feinstein directed his student to prominent teaching positions in Staten Island and Brooklyn.

Following in his father's footsteps, Blumenkrantz took the helm of a synagogue in Far Rockaway, Queens.

=== Passover guide ===
The Laws of Pesach for 2006

Blumenkrantz is best remembered for his annual Passover guide, The Laws of Pesach, a publication relied upon by observant Jews throughout North America to maintain high standards of kashrut observance during Passover. Blumenkrantz would update the guide annually, to reflect changes in the food industry: new products, new ingredients, changes in food preparation methods, etc. The guide began as an unpublished newsletter that Blumenkrantz began to privately distribute in the 1970s. As the circulation of the newsletter spread, more and more people consulted him on complicated questions of Passover observance. As a result of this, Blumenkrantz expanded the coverage of his newsletter until it became book-length, a yearly undertaking that took several months to put together. Blumenkrantz was working on the 2007 volume of the guide at the time of his death. His family announced that the work would be completed in time for Passover. The family continues to publish the Passover Guide in his memory annually.

== Personal life ==
Blumenkrantz was married to Shaindel (née Braunstein) and they had 15 children together.

His son, Yisroel Blumenkrantz is the rabbi of Bais Medrash Ateres Yisroel, the synagogue his father founded in Far Rockaway.

== Death and burial ==
Blumenkrantz died in New York on February 22, 2007, of heart complications. He was flown to Israel for burial in the Mount of Olives Jewish Cemetery in Jerusalem.

== Sources ==
- Gershon Tannenbaum, Rabbi Avrohom Blumenkrantz zt”l (1944-2007) Kashrus Champion, The Jewish Press, February 28, 2007
- Yair Hoffman, Obituary of Rabbi Avrohom Blumenkrantz, Five Towns Jewish Times, March 1, 2007
- T. Silber, Remembering Harav Avraham Blumenkrantz zt"l: A Renowned Rav, Posek, and Mentor, Hamodia (New York), February 28, 2007
