= Avraham Mattisyahu Friedman =

Hasidic rabbi from Romania (1848-1933)

Avraham Matisyahu Friedman
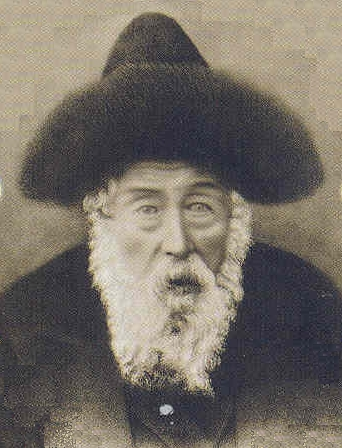

Personal life
- Born: 1848 Sadigura, Galicia, Austria-Hungary (now Sadhora, Ukraine)
- Died: 1933 (aged 84–85) Iași, Kingdom of Romania
- Buried: Ștefănești
- Occupation: Rabbi, Rebbe, Tzadik

Religious life
- Religion: Judaism

Avraham Mattisyahu Friedman (1848 - 1933), also known as Abraham/Avrum Matitiahu Friedman was a Romanian rabbi, the Shtefanesht Tzadik. He is considered one of the most important figures of Hasidism.
