= Dovid Feinstein =

American rabbi (1929–2020)

Rabbi Dovid Feinstein Zatza"l
- Title: Harav Rosh Yeshiva

Personal life
- Born: 1929 Lyuban, Second Polish Republic (currently Belarus)
- Died: November 6, 2020 (aged 91)
- Spouse: Malka Feinstein
- Children: Berel Feinstein; Gittie Fishelis; Mordechai Feinstein, Moshe Shmuel Yaakov Feinstein
- Parents: Rabbi Moshe Feinstein (father); Shima Feinstein (mother)

Religious life
- Religion: Judaism
- Denomination: Orthodox Judaism

Jewish leader
- Predecessor: Rabbi Moshe Feinstein
- Position: Rosh yeshiva
- Yeshiva: Mesivtha Tifereth Jerusalem
- Began: 1986
- Ended: 2020
- Main work: Kol Dodi
- Other: Moetzes Gedolei Hatorah; Artscroll Board of Trustees
- Yahrtzeit: 19 Cheshvan (next occurs on October 30, 2026)
- Residence: Lower East Side, New York, NY

Dovid Feinstein (Hebrew: דוד פיינשטיין; 1929 – November 6, 2020) was an American rabbi and halachic authority. He served as the rosh yeshiva (dean) of the Mesivtha Tifereth Jerusalem yeshiva elementary and high school and kollel, inheriting the position after the passing of his father Rabbi Moshe Feinstein in 1986. He also wrote a number of books on such topics as halacha, Torah and the Jewish calendar, as well as some very popular Passover Haggadahs.

His brother, Rabbi Reuven Feinstein, is rosh yeshiva of the Staten Island branch of Mesivtha Tifereth Jerusalem.

== Biography ==
Dovid Feinstein was born in 1929 in Lyuban (in present-day Belarus), where his father Moshe Feinstein served as a rabbi of the community. He was named after his paternal grandfather, who was descended from the brother of the Vilna Gaon. When he was eight, his family moved to Manhattan, where he would reside until his death. He died at the age of 91 in 2020.

He was known for following the directive of the mishnah in Avos 1:15 "אמור מעט ועשה הרבה - Speak less and do more".

A full biography simply titled "Reb Dovid" was published by Artscroll. A publisher he was intimately involved in and served among its Founding Trustees until his death.

== Published works ==
=== Kol Dodi ===
The title Kol Dodi (Hebrew: קול דודי) originated in the 1970s, when Feinstein's father was still alive, and Feinstein would not allow his own name on the cover. Hence Kol Dodi – the first three letters of Dodi (Hebrew: דודי) spell the name Dovid (Hebrew: דוד).

Kol Dodi means "My Beloved's voice", and is taken from Song of Songs (5:2), where is commonly understood in Judaism to be a reference to God.

- Kol Dodi on the Torah
- Kol Dodi on the Haftaros
- Kol Dodi on Megillas Esther
- Kol Dodi on Megillas Ruth
- Kol Dodi: Seasonings of the Torah
- Kol Dodi: Laws of the Seder
- Haggadah Anah Dodi
- The Jewish Calendar - Its structure and laws

=== Stone Chumash Masoretic notes ===
Within ArtScroll's Stone Chumash, at the end of each Parsha there is an explanation, authored by him, of that Parsha's Masoretic note.
