= Rav muvhak =

Rabbi who taught a student most of his knowledge

Rav muvhak (Hebrew: רב מובהק) refers to the teacher from whom a student rabbi received "most of his knowledge". Thus, muvhak could be understood as "principal", or "primary". Correspondingly, talmid muvhak may refer to a rabbi's primary, or outstanding, student.

The typical usage is to state that a particular student's rav muvhak is rabbi A, whereas the student also studied under rabbi B. Rabo (Hebrew: רבו) means his rav/rebbe/rabbi, hence the term rabo muvhak, i.e. "his principal rabbi". According to Jewish law, special honour must be given to a rav muvhak.

In modern times most student rabbis are educated by a number of different rabbis. Therefore, the concept rav muvhak is now uncommon.
