= Margolin Hebrew Academy =

- Memphis Hebrew Academy

Location
- 390 South White Station; Memphis, Tennessee 38117; United States
- Coordinates: 35°7′13″N 89°53′11″W

Information
- School type: Parochial
- Motto: ...To EMPOWER and INSPIRE...
- Religious affiliation: Orthodox Jewish
- Opened: 1949
- Sister school: Goldie Margolin School for Girls
- Head of school: Rabbi Gavriel Brown, Ph.D.
- Grades: Pre-K, 3–12
- Gender: Co-Ed
- Colors: Blue and Yellow
- Nickname: Macs
- Newspaper: The Reporter
- Website: www.mhafyos.org

The Margolin Hebrew Academy is a co-educational school located in East Memphis, Tennessee. It is the only Orthodox Jewish day school in Memphis. The MHA/FYOS comprises the Leach Early Childhood center for pre-K3 through kindergarten, the Margolin Hebrew Academy, the 1st through 8th grade section, the Cooper Yeshiva of the South, which includes the Cooper Yeshiva High School for Boys, and the Goldie Margolin High School for Girls. The school is accredited by the Southern Association of Independent Schools (SAIS). The school is also associated with the Memphis Jewish Federation.

The head of school for the PK–12th grades is Rabbi Gavriel Brown, Ph.D.

== Athletics ==
The school offers basketball, flag football, golf, and tennis. The team name is the Maccabees (shortened to the "Macs," carrying a Jewish background as the team bases its name off of the Jewish soldiers in the war against the Greeks). The varsity high school girls and boys teams play in the TSSAA (Tennessee Secondary School Athletic Association).

== Goldie Margolin School for Girls ==
The Goldie Margolin School for Girls (GMSG) was established in 1964 as an extension of the former Memphis Hebrew Academy, created in response to a community and regional need for an Orthodox Jewish high school for girls. The current principal is Sara Plotitsa. The newsletter for the girl's high school is called the Goldie Globe.

== Cooper Yeshiva High School for Boys ==
The CYHSB was founded in 1966 as the Feinstone Yeshiva of the South, and was changed to the CYHSB in 1993, but kept the FYOS name for the elementary school and part of the high school. In 2025, the highschool changed its name from the Feinstone Yeshiva Of the South (FYOS) to the Cooper Yeshiva Of the South (CYOS). The current judaics principal is Rabbi Dov Rossman. The current general studies principal is Dr. Whitney Kennon. The newsletter for the boy's high school is called The Weekly.

== Boarding ==
The school includes a boarding facility, and have recently hosted people from Baltimore, Maryland; Belarus; Boston, Massachusetts; Indianapolis, Indiana; Israel; Ponte Verde Beach, Florida; Woodmere, New York; and New York City, New York. They host yearly the Kollel Torah Mitzion guys and the Bat Ami girls, people from Israel to learn and teach the kids about Israel at all levels of the school and the Bornblum Jewish Community School.
