= Lyuban, Belarus =

Town in Minsk Region, Belarus

Lyuban Любань
- Town
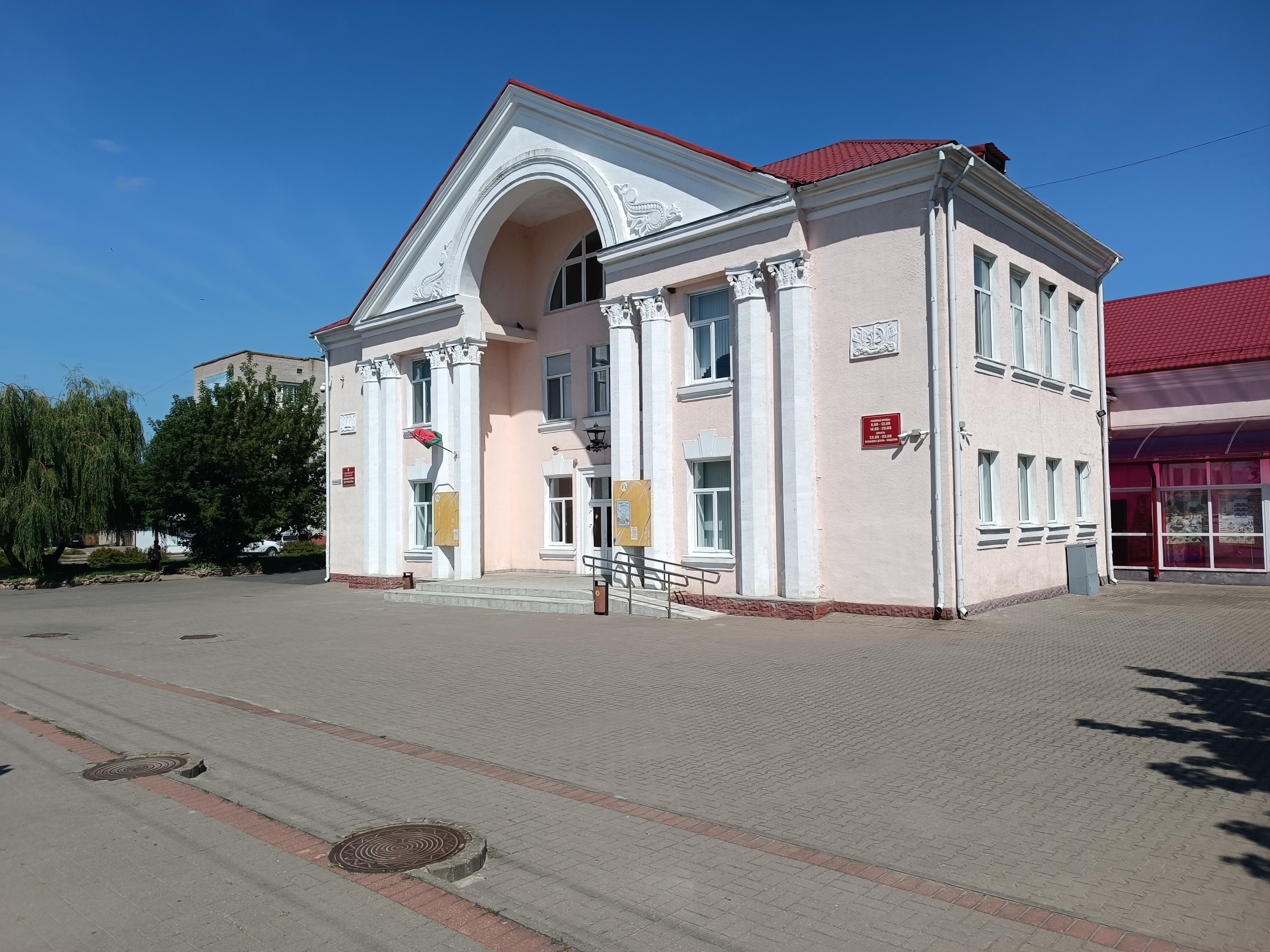

- Flag Coat of arms

- Location within Belarus
- Coordinates: 52°47′55″N 27°59′30″E
- Country: Belarus
- Region: Minsk Region
- District: Lyuban District
- First mentioned: 1566

Population (2026)
  - Total: 11,165
- Time zone: UTC+3 (MSK)
- Postal code: 223812
- Area code: +375 1794
- License plate: 5
- Website: Official website

Lyuban (Note: Belarusian: Любань, romanized: Liubań; Russian: Любань; Polish: Lubań; Lithuanian: Liubanė.) is a town in Minsk Region, in south-central Belarus. It serves as the administrative center of Lyuban District. In 2009, its population was 11,256. As of 2026, it has a population of 11,165.

== History ==
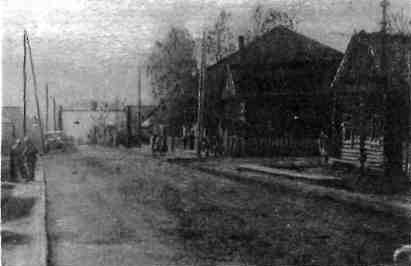
Lubań in 1936

The town was first mentioned in 1566 and received its town status in 1968. Within the Polish–Lithuanian Commonwealth, it was administratively located in the Nowogródek Voivodeship.

During World War II, Nazi Germany occupied the town from July 1941 to June 1944. In August 1941, 150 to 200 Jews of the village are murdered in a mass execution perpetrated by Germans at a gravel pit near the village of Dubniki. In September 1941, a ghetto surrounded with barbed wire was created in the west part of the village of Lyuban, near Pervomayiskayia Street. It was guarded by Germans and local policemen. Jews were used as forced labor, cleaning or repairing roads. On November 8, 1941, 50 Jewish men were shot, as a reprisal action after a partisan attack. On December 4, 1941, the ghetto was liquidated and Jews were murdered.

== Geography ==
Lyuban is located 139 kilometres (86 mi) south of Minsk, not too far from the borders with the regions of Mogilev and Gomel. It is located 58 kilometres (36 mi) from Salihorsk, 30 kilometres (19 mi) from Slutsk and 26 kilometres (16 mi) from Staryya Darohi. The Lyuban Lake is situated north of the town and the mining area of Kaliy is located to the west, close to the Salihorsk suburbs. It is not served by railways but the nearest station, in Urechcha, is located 8 kilometres (5.0 mi) from the center of Lyuban.

== Notable residents ==
- Yeruchom Levovitz (1875–1935), rabbi
- Rakhel Feygenberg (1895–1972), writer
- Moshe Feinstein (1895–1986), rabbi
- Dovid Feinstein (1929–2020), rabbi
