= Moshe Feinstein =

Belarusian-born American Orthodox rabbi (1895–1986)

Rabbi Moshe Feinstein
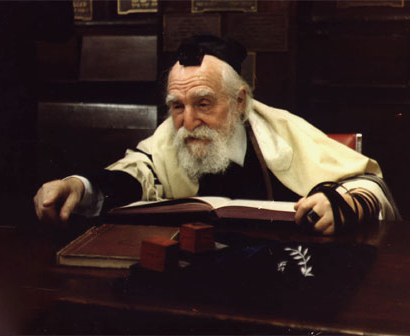
- At his desk in Mesivtha Tifereth Jerusalem
- Born: March 3, 1895; Uzda, Minsk Governorate, Russian Empire
- Died: March 23, 1986 (aged 91); New York City, U.S.
- Resting place: Har HaMenuchot, West Jerusalem; 31.8°N 35.183333°E
- Other names: Rav Moshe, Reb Moshe
- Occupations: Rabbi, Posek
- Employer: Mesivtha Tifereth Jerusalem
- Known for: Igros Moshe, various rulings in Jewish law
- Spouse: Shima Kustanovitch
- Children: 5, including Dovid and Reuven

Moshe Feinstein (Yiddish: משה פֿײַנשטײן; Lithuanian pronunciation: Moishe Fainshtein; English: Moses Feinstein; March 3, 1895 – March 23, 1986) was a Russian-born American Orthodox Jewish rabbi, scholar, and posek (authority on halakha—Jewish law). He has been called the most famous Orthodox Jewish legal authority of the 20th century and his rulings are often referenced in contemporary rabbinic literature. Feinstein served as president of the Union of Orthodox Rabbis, chairman of the Council of the Moetzes Gedolei HaTorah of the Agudath Israel of America, and head of Mesivtha Tifereth Jerusalem in New York.

Feinstein is commonly called "Reb Moshe" (or "Rav Moshe").

== Biography ==
Moshe Feinstein was born, according to the Hebrew calendar, on Adar 7, 5655, in Uzda, Minsk Governorate, in the Russian Empire (now in Belarus). His father, David Feinstein, was the rabbi of Uzda and a great-grandson of the Vilna Gaon's brother. David Feinstein's father, Yechiel Michel Feinstein, was a Koidanover Chassid. His mother was a descendant of talmudist Yom-Tov Lipmann Heller, the Shlah HaKadosh, and Rashi. He studied with his father and in yeshivas in Slutsk, under Pesach Pruskin, and Shklov.

Feinstein was rabbi of Lyuban for 16 years. He married Shima Kustanovich in 1920 and had four children before leaving Europe.

Settling on the Lower East Side, Feinstein became the rosh yeshiva of Mesivtha Tifereth Jerusalem.

Feinstein was president of the Union of Orthodox Rabbis of the United States and Canada and chaired the Moetzes Gedolei HaTorah of Agudath Israel of America from the 1960s until his death.

Feinstein was said by some to be the preeminent halakhic authority (posek) of his generation, ruling on issues of Jewish law as they pertain to modern times.

== Halakhic authority ==
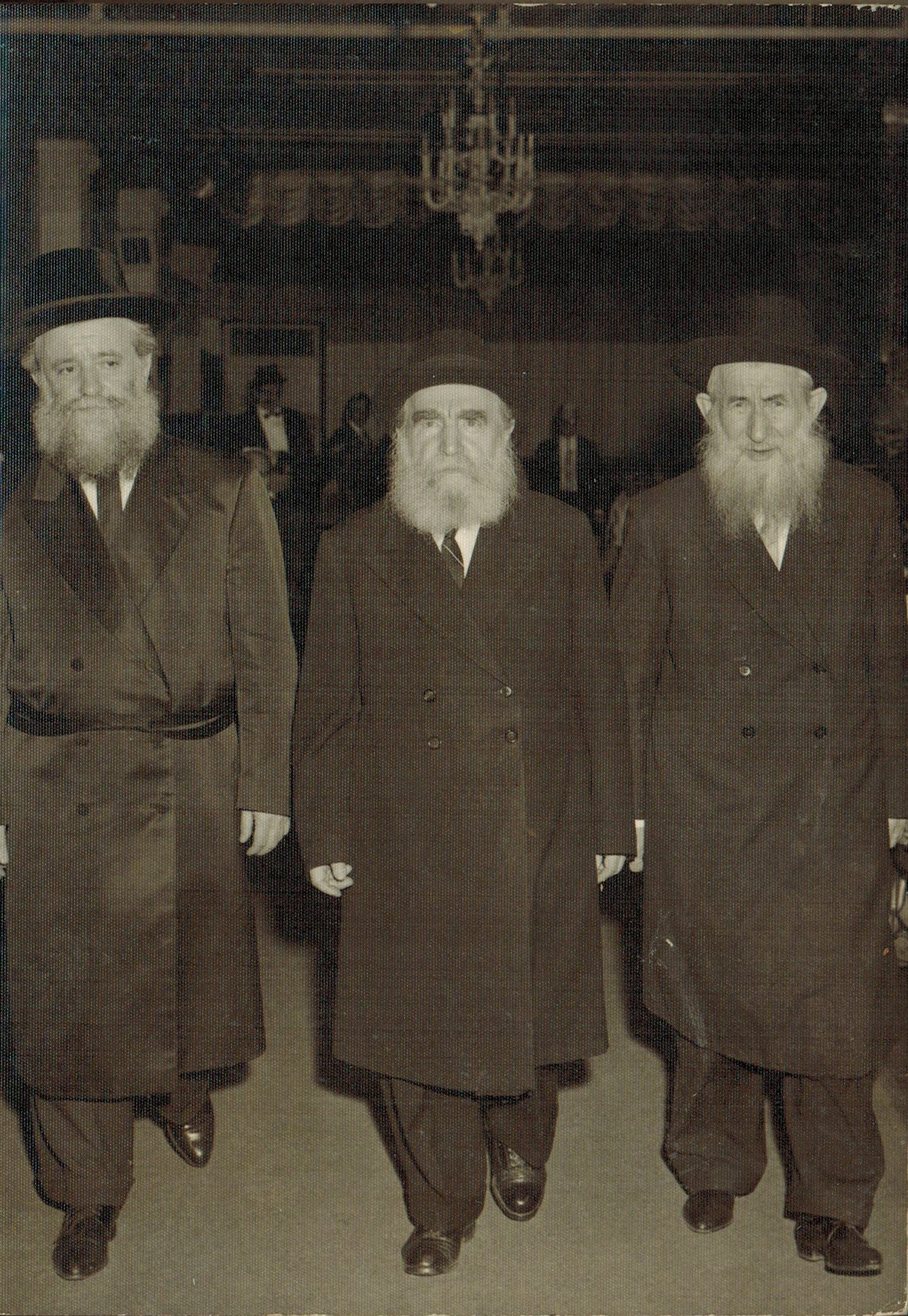
Feinstein (center) with Yona Shtencel (left)

Owing to his prominence as an adjudicator of Jewish law, Feinstein was often asked to rule on very difficult questions, whereupon he often employed a number of innovative and controversial theories to reach his decisions. Soon after arriving in the United States, he established a reputation for handling business and labor disputes, writing about strikes, seniority, and fair competition. He later served as the chief halakhic authority for the Association of Orthodox Jewish Scientists, an indication of his expertise in Jewish medical ethics. In the medical arena, he opposed the early, unsuccessful heart transplants, although it has been reported off-the-record that in his later years, he allowed a person to receive a heart transplant after the medical technique of preventing rejection improved. On such matters, he often consulted with various scientific experts, including his son-in-law Moshe David Tendler, a professor of biology who served as a rosh yeshiva at Yeshiva University.

As one of the prominent leaders of American Orthodoxy, Feinstein issued opinions that clearly distanced his community from Conservative and Reform Judaism. (Note: For example, see Roth, Joel. The Halakhic Process: A Systematic Analysis, JTS: 1986, pp.71ff. Robinson (2001).) He faced intense opposition from Hasidic Orthodoxy on several controversial decisions, such as rulings on artificial insemination and mechitza. Feinstein did not prohibit cigarette smoking, though he recommended against it and prohibited secondhand smoke; other Orthodox rabbinic authorities disagreed. Even while disagreeing with specific rulings, his detractors still considered him a leading interpreter of Jewish law. The first volume of his Igrot Moshe, a voluminous collection of his halakhic decisions, was published in 1959.

== Death ==
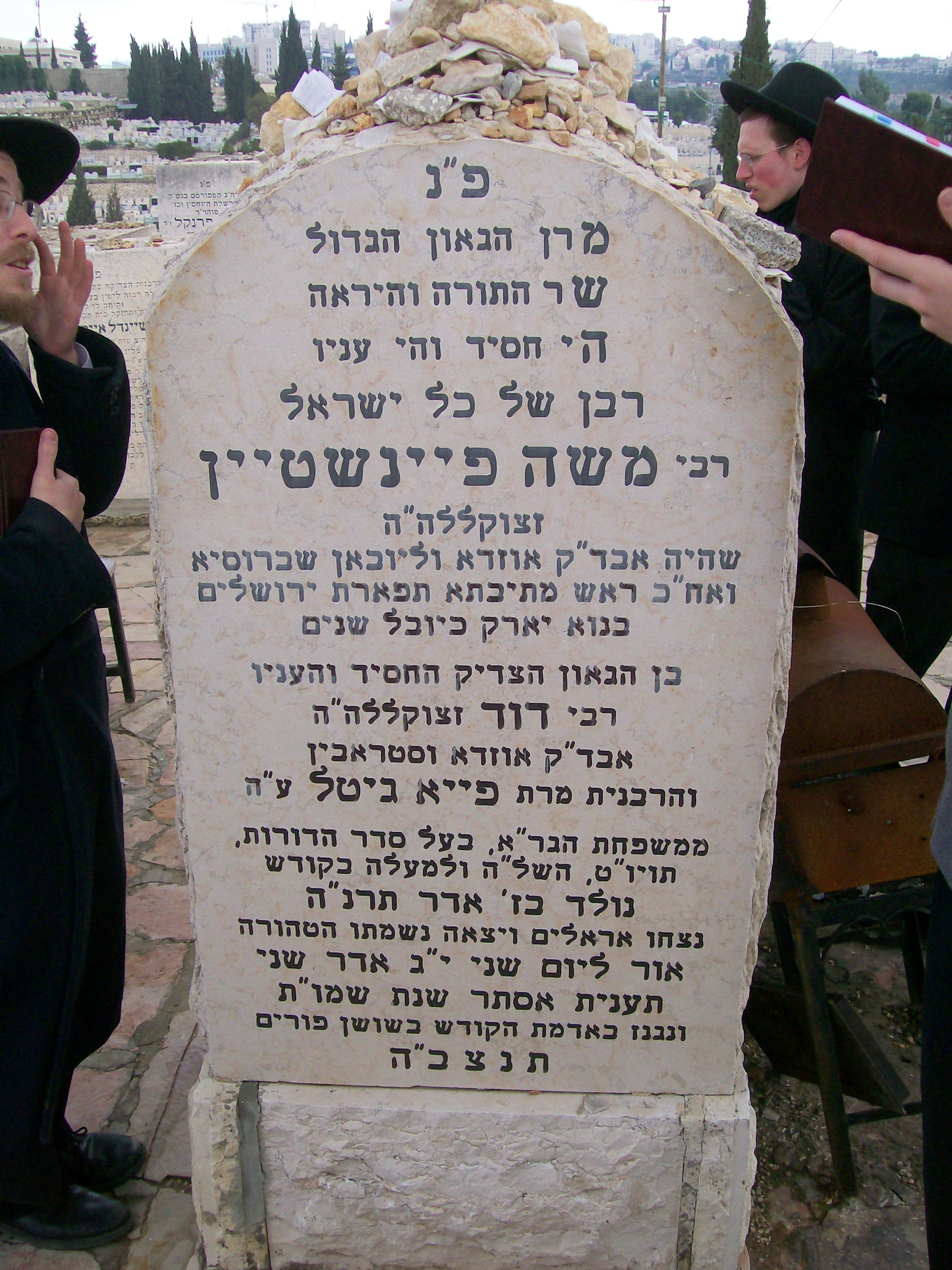
Feinstein's grave with visitation stones on it

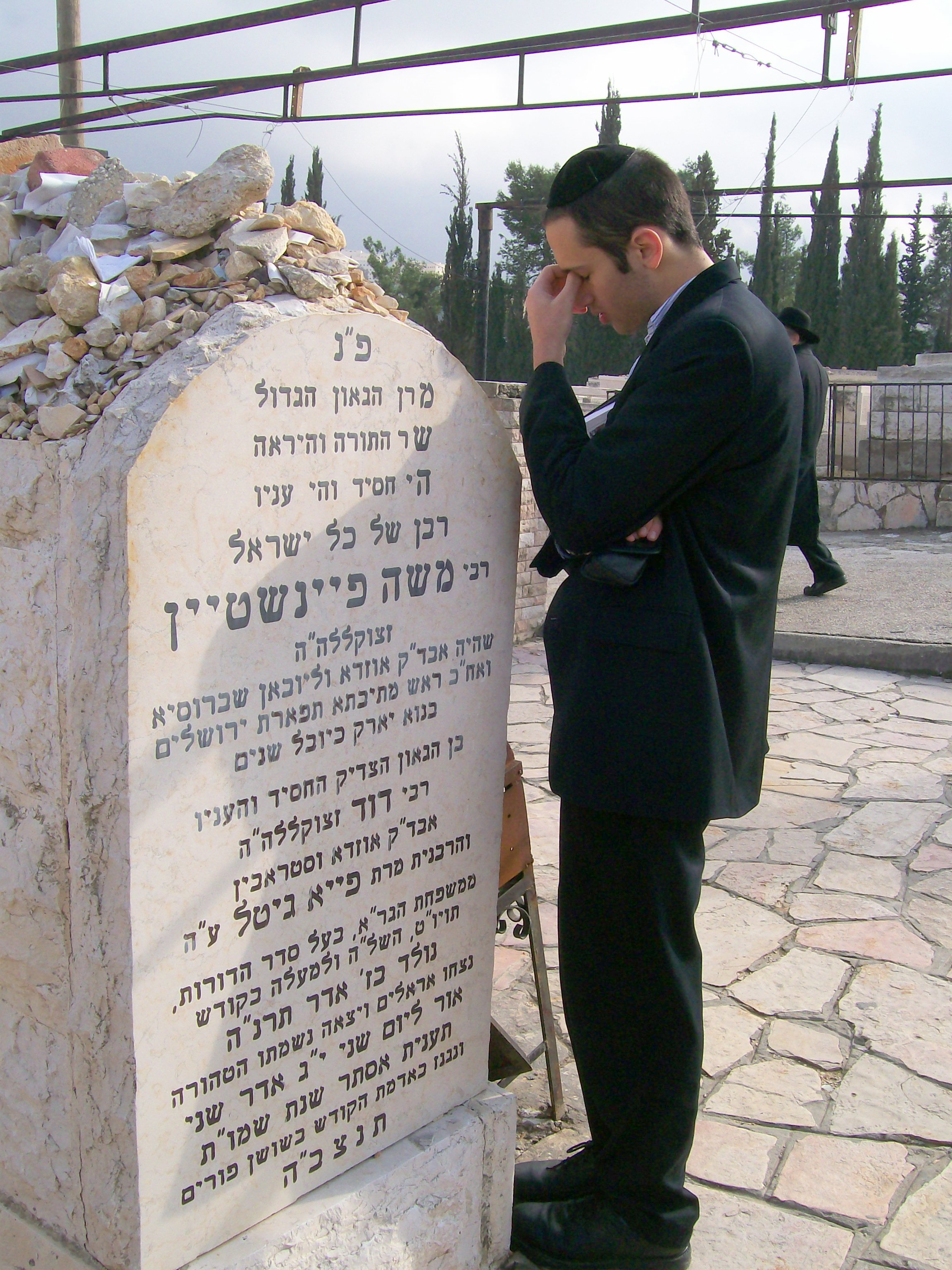
Feinstein's grave

Feinstein died on March 23, 1986 (13th of Adar II, 5746). Over 20,000 people gathered to hear him eulogized in New York before he was flown to Israel for burial. His funeral was delayed by a day due to mechanical problems with the plane carrying his coffin, which had to return to New York. The funeral was said to be attended by between 200,000 and 250,000 people.

Feinstein was buried on Har HaMenuchot near his teacher, Isser Zalman Meltzer.

== Prominent students ==
Feinstein's students include:

- Nisson Alpert, rabbi of Agudath Israel of Long Island, New York
- Avrohom Blumenkrantz (1944–2007), author of The Laws of Pesach
- Shimon Eider, posek and author
- Dovid Feinstein, rosh yeshiva of Mesivtha Tifereth Jerusalem in New York City, his son
- Reuven Feinstein, rosh yeshiva of Yeshiva of Staten Island, New York, his son
- Ephraim Greenblatt, posek
- Nota Greenblatt, Av Beis Din (chief judge) of Vaad Hakehilos of Memphis, Tennessee
- Jackie Mason, rabbi and comedian who played Rabbi Hyman Krustofsky on The Simpsons
- Moshe Dovid Tendler, rosh yeshiva (dean) at Rabbi Isaac Elchanan Theological Seminary, his son-in-law

== Works ==
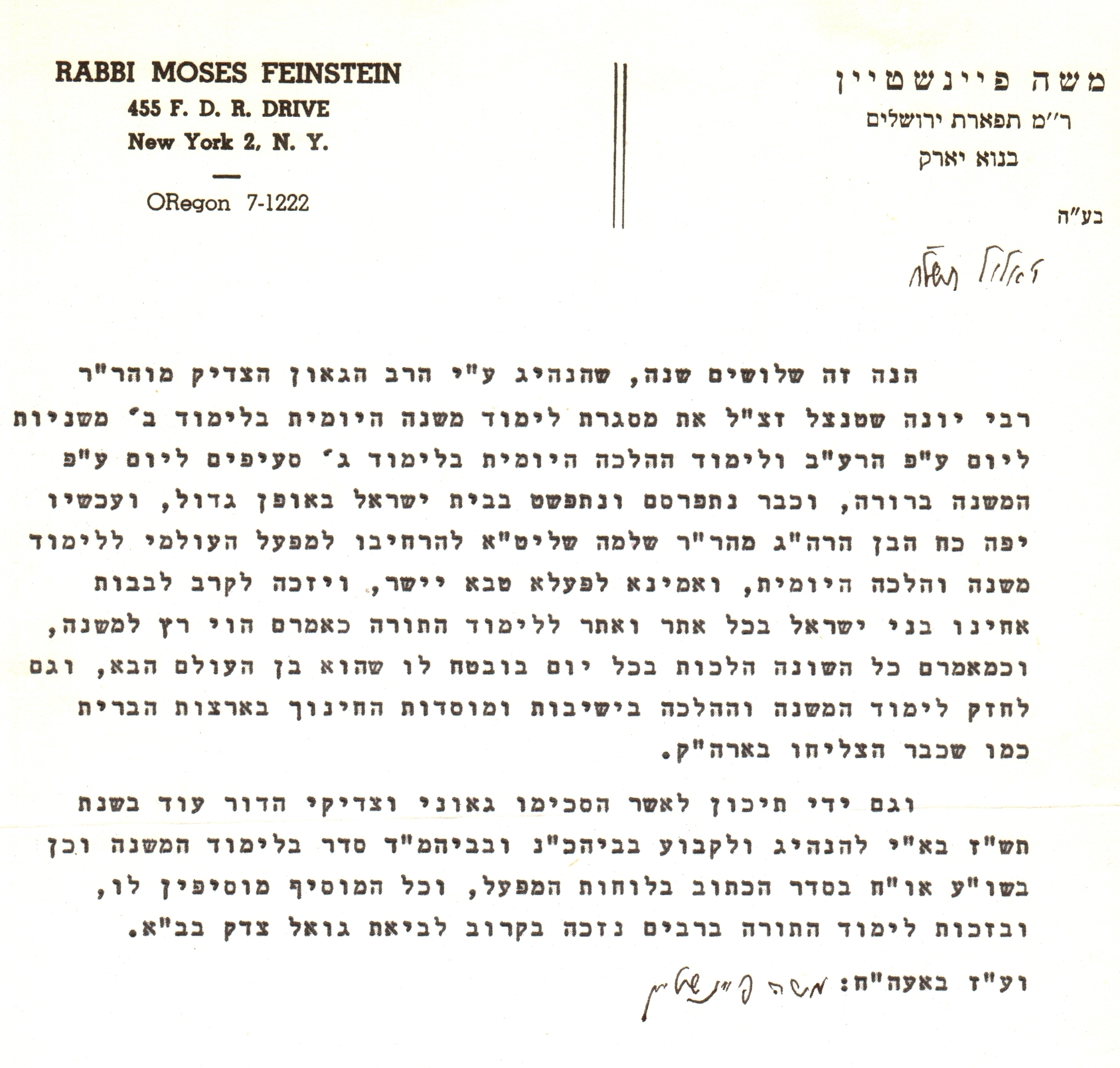
One of Feinstein's responsa

Feinstein wrote approximately 2,000 responsa on a wide range of issues affecting Jewish practice in the modern era. Some responsa can be found in his Talmudic commentary (Dibrot Moshe), some circulate informally, and 1,883 responsa were published in Igrot Moshe. Among Feinstein's works are:

- Igrot Moshe (Epistles of Moshe, pronounced Igros Moshe by Yiddish speakers such as Feinstein), halakhic responsa in seven volumes published during his lifetime and widely referenced by contemporary halakhic authorities. The seventh volume was published in two different forms, the resulting variations found in 65 responsa. An additional two volumes were published posthumously from manuscripts and oral dictations transcribed by others.
- Dibrot Moshe (Moshe's Words, pronounced Dibros Moshe by Yiddish speakers), a 14-volume work of Talmudic novellae with additional volumes published by the Feinstein Foundation and coordinated by his grandson Mordecai Tendler.
- Darash Moshe (Moshe Expounds, a reference to Leviticus 10:16), a posthumously published volume of novellae on the weekly synagogue Torah reading. Artscroll subsequently translated this as a two-volume English work.
- Kol Ram (High Voice), three volumes printed in his lifetime by Avraham Fishelis, the director of his yeshiva.

Some of Feinstein's early works, including a commentary on the Jerusalem Talmud, were lost in Communist Russia, though the Feinstein Foundation is preparing his first writings for publication.

Feinstein is known for writing, in a number of places, that certain statements by prominent rishonim that he found theologically objectionable were not in fact written by those rishonim, but rather inserted into the text by erring students. (Note: For example, Yehudah haHasid's statement that certain verses of the Torah were written by an author other than Moses; and Nachmanides' statement that Abraham sinned by leaving Canaan and endangering his wife in Egypt (Darash Moshe Vayeira 18:13: Hebrew: וטעות גדול ברמב"ן שכתב שאברהם חטא בזה, ותלמיד טועה טעה לדבר ח"ו סרה על אברהם [transl. And a big mistake in Nahmanides who wrote that Abraham thus sinned, and an errant student misspoke wrongly, heaven forbid, regarding Abraham.])) According to Rabbi Dovid Cohen of Brooklyn, Feinstein attributed such comments to students as a way of politely rejecting statements by rishonim while still retaining full reverence for them as religious leaders of earlier generations.

== Bibliography ==
- Dor-Shav (Dershowitz), Zecharia (2022). "Personal Experiences with Great Rabbis of My Generation". Dershowitz Family Saga. Skyhorse. ISBN 9781510770232.
- Eidensohn, Daniel (2000). יד משה: מפתח לכל ח׳ חלקים של שו״ת אגרות משה מאת משה פיינשטיין (in Hebrew). Jerusalem, Israel: D. Eidensohn. OCLC 51317225.
- Ellenson, David. "Two Responsa of Rabbi Moshe Feinstein." American Jewish Archives Journal, Volume LII, Nos. 1 and 2, Fall 2000–2001.
- Feinstein, Moshe; Moshe David Tendler (1996). Responsa of Rav Moshe Feinstein: translation and commentary. [translated and annotated] by Moshe Dovid Tendler. Hoboken, NJ: KTAV Publishing House. ISBN 0-88125-444-4. LCCN 96011212. OCLC 34476198.
- Rabbi Shimon Finkelman, Rabbi Nosson Scherman. Reb Moshe: The Life and Ideals of HaGaon Rabbi Moshe Feinstein. Brooklyn, NY: ArtScroll Mesorah, 1986. ISBN 0-89906-480-9.
- Halperin, Mordechai (2006). "The Theological and Halakhic Legitimacy of Medical Therapy and Enhancement". In Noam Zohar (ed.). Quality of life in Jewish bioethics. Lanham, MD: Lexington Books. ISBN 0-7391-1446-8. LCCN 2005029443. OCLC 62078279.
- Joseph, Norma Baumel (1995). Separate Spheres: Women in the Responsa of Rabbi Moses Feinstein (PhD thesis). Concordia University.
- "Rav Moshe Feinstein". Great Leaders of our People. Orthodox Union.
- _________. "Jewish education for women: Rabbi Moshe Feinstein's map of America." American Jewish history, 1995
- Rackman, Emanuel. "Halachic progress: Rabbi Moshe Feinstein's Igrot Moshe on Even ha-Ezer" in Judaism 12 (1964), 365–373
- Robinson, Ira. "Because of our many sins: The contemporary Jewish world as reflected in the responsa of Moses Feinstein" 2001
- Rosner, Fred. "Rabbi Moshe Feinstein's Influence on Medical Halacha" Journal of Halacha and Contemporary Society. No. XX, 1990
- __________. Rabbi Moshe Feinstein on the treatment of the terminally ill." Judaism. Spring 37(2):188–98. 1988
- Rabbi Mordecai Tendler, interview with grandson of Rabbi Feinstein and shamash for 18 years.
- Warshofsky, Mark E. "Responsa and the Art of Writing: Three Examples from the Teshuvot of Rabbi Moshe Feinstein," in An American Rabbinate: A Festschrift for Walter Jacob Pittsburgh, Rodef Shalom Press, 2001 (Download in PDF format)
- Joseph, Norma Baumel. “Jewish Education for Women: Rabbi Moshe Feinstein’s Map of America.” American Jewish History 83, no. 2 (1995): 205–22. JSTOR https://www.jstor.org/stable/23885639/
- Jotkowitz, Alan. “R. MOSHE FEINSTEIN AND THE ROLE OF AUTONOMY IN MEDICAL ETHICS DECISION MAKING.” Modern Judaism 30, no. 2 (2010): 196–208. JSTOR http://www.jstor.org/stable/40604706.
- Jotkowitz, Alan. “THE SEMINAL CONTRIBUTION OF RABBI MOSHE FEINSTEIN TO THE DEVELOPMENT OF MODERN JEWISH MEDICAL ETHICS.” The Journal of Religious Ethics 42, no. 2 (2014): 285–309. JSTOR http://www.jstor.org/stable/24586142.
