= Mesivtha Tifereth Jerusalem =

Yeshiva in New York City

- מתיבתא תפארת ירושלים

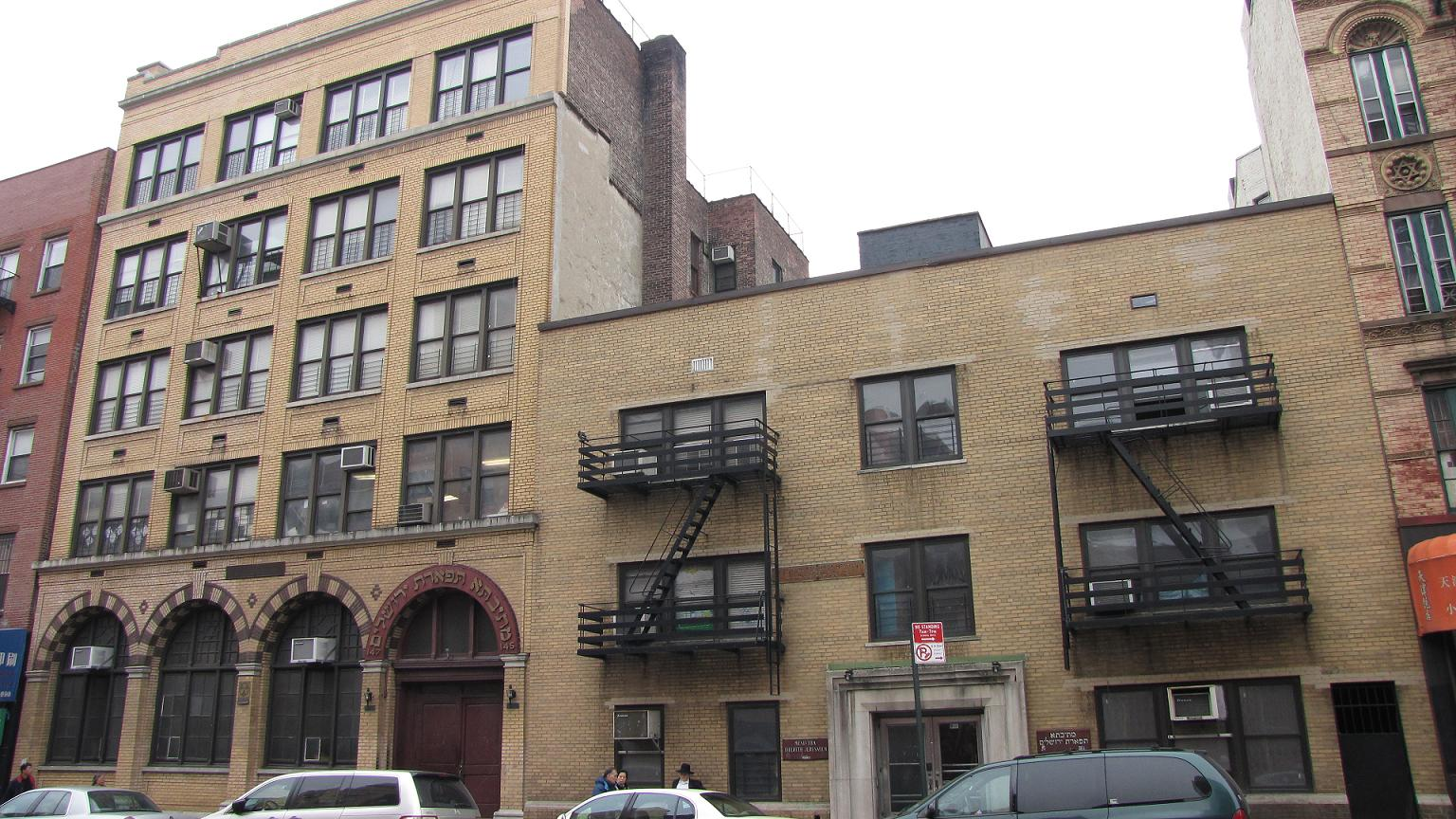

Location
- 145-147 East Broadway, Lower East Side, New York City; United States; 40°42.83′0″N 73°59.47′0″W

Information
- Type: Yeshiva
- Religious affiliation: Haredi Judaism
- Established: 1907; 119 years ago
- Principal: Berel Feinstein
- Gender: Male
- Campus type: Urban, suburban
- Website: mtj.edu

Mesivtha Tifereth Jerusalem (MTJ) (Hebrew: מתיבתא תפארת ירושלים, Mesivta Tiferet Yerushaláyim) is a yeshiva on the Lower East Side of New York City. One of the oldest yeshivas in the city, MTJ was once led by Moshe Feinstein. A second campus, known as Yeshiva of Staten Island, is located in Staten Island, New York. The suburban campus contains a high school, college, post-college facilities and a dormitory.

== History ==
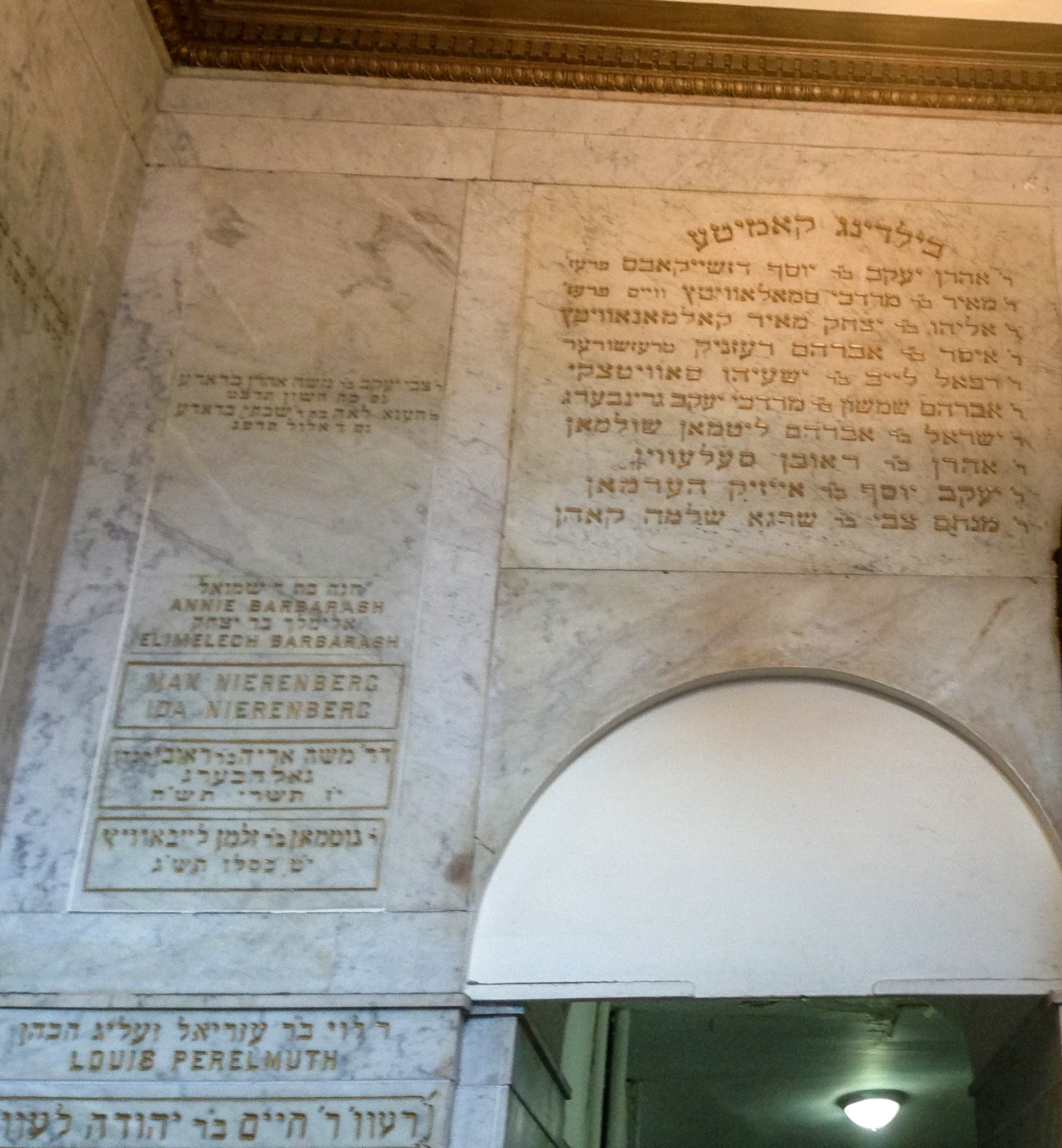
Interior and 1922 dedication plaque

The yeshiva was originally organized in 1905 as a synagogue, known as Congregation Tifereth Jerusalem, at 115 Hester Street on the Lower East Side of New York City. In 1907, the congregation moved to 87 Eldridge Street and opened the yeshiva originally calling it "Talmud Torah Tifereth Jerusalem Yeshiva." This makes it one of the oldest yeshivas in New York City. The congregation hired Yehuda Sachs Wolpert to administer the institution as he previously served as Rabbi in Libau, part of the Zamut region of Lithuania.

Mesivtha Tifereth Jerusalem (MTJ) moved to a few temporary locations including 240 Madison Street, the Rabbi Isaac Elchanan Theological Seminary at 9-11 Montgomery Street, and 147 East Broadway. In 1917, the board of directors purchased 145 East Broadway and combined it with the 147 East Broadway property where they built a new permanent building.

In June 1922, the new MTJ building had its grand opening marked by a parade and attendance by leading rabbis in New York along with media coverage in The Hebrew Standard and the Jewish Morning Journal. The president of the yeshiva was Aaron Yaakov Dashkovitz, with Yaakov Yosef Herman serving on the board of directors.

Originally an elementary school, a high school was established in the late 1920s, and a post–high school yeshivah was later added. MTJ now offers a full range of classes, from pre-kindergarten through post-high school.

Yosef Adler served as rosh yeshiva (dean) and in 1936, hired his cousin Moshe Feinstein to start a Beis Medrash and semikhah (rabbinic ordination) program at the yeshiva. In 1938, after Adler died of a heart attack while swimming, Feinstein became the rosh yeshiva. Michel Barenbaum became the mashgiach ruchani (student supervisor) in the late 1940s (he died on March 4, 2003). Following Feinstein's death, MTJ was led by his son Dovid Feinstein until his death in November 2020. The school is now led by the latter's son Berel Feinstein.

MTJ was involved in a money laundering scandal in the 1980s.

== Yeshiva of Staten Island ==
A second branch of MTJ was established in 1966 in Staten Island. Known as Yeshiva of Staten Island, it is led by Moshe Feinstein's youngest son Reuven. The yeshiva's mashgiach, Chaim Mintz, also founded and runs the kiruv organization Oorah.

== Sports ==
Moshe Feinstein was against attending sporting events, but MTJ "participated in competitive sporting events that included spectators."
