= Lyuban district =

District of Minsk region, Belarus

Lyuban district Любанскі раён (Belarusian) Любанский район (Russian)
- District
- Flag Coat of arms

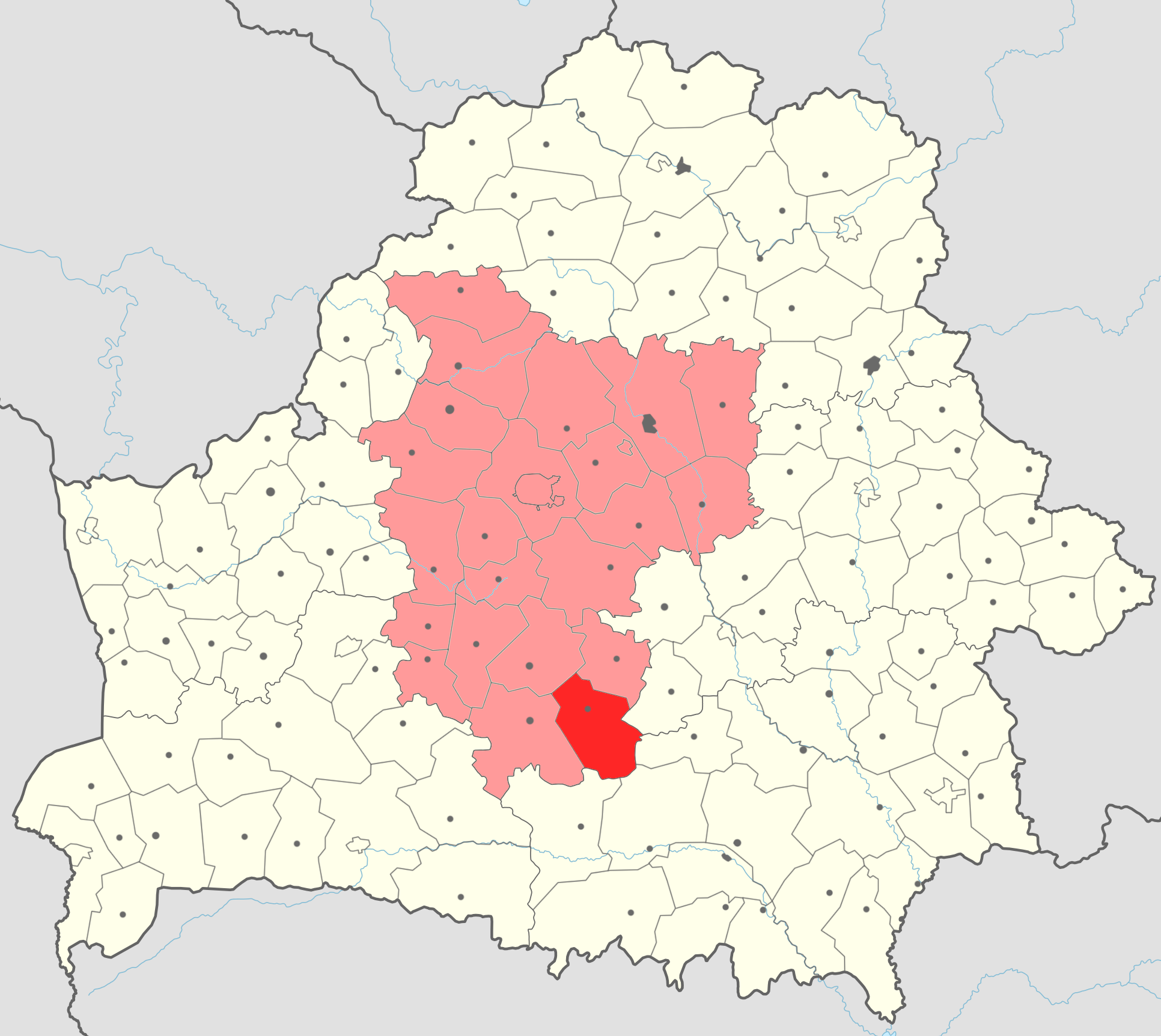
- Coordinates: 52°46′55″N 28°03′09″E
- Country: Belarus
- Region: Minsk Region
- Administrative center: Lyuban

Area
  - District: 1,913 km^{2} (739 sq mi)

Population (2024)
  - District: 28,473
  - Density: 14.88/km^{2} (38.55/sq mi)
  - Urban: 13,678
  - Rural: 14,795
- Time zone: UTC+3 (MSK)
- Website: Lyuban ispolkom website

Lyuban district or Liubań district (Belarusian: Любанскі раён; Russian: Любанский район, romanized: Lyubansky rayon) is a district (raion) of Minsk region in Belarus. The administrative center of the district is Lyuban. As of 2024, it has a population of 28,473.

== Notable residents ==
- Władysław Syrokomla (1823, Smolków estate – 1862), poet, writer and translator
