= Shmuel Schecter =

Canadian-American Orthodox Jewish rabbi

Rabbi Shmuel Schecter

Personal life
- Born: Shmuel Halevi Schecter; February 21, 1915 Lachine, Quebec
- Died: September 30, 2000 (aged 85) Jerusalem
- Spouse: Chava Gordon
- Children: 6
- Education: Yeshivas Rabbi Yitzchak Elchanan; Mir Yeshiva, Poland; Kelm Talmud Torah

Religious life
- Religion: Judaism
- Denomination: Orthodox Judaism
- Yeshiva: Mesivta Toras Emes, Brooklyn
- Position: Dean
- Yahrtzeit: 1 Tishrei 5761
- Semikhah: Rabbi Eliezer Yehuda Finkel (Mir Poland)

Shmuel Halevi Schecter (Hebrew: שמואל הלוי שכטר; February 21, 1915 – September 30, 2000) was a Canadian–American Orthodox Jewish rabbi, educator, and author. Born in Quebec and raised in Baltimore, he traveled to Eastern Europe to study at the Mir Yeshiva as a teenager and at the Kelm Talmud Torah as a young married man. In 1940 he returned to the United States, where he was a co-founder of the first kollel in America, Beth Medrash Govoha, in White Plains, New York. He was a Torah educator in New York and Boston for more than 50 years, and served as dean of Mesivta Toras Emes in Brooklyn. He published a commentary on Orchot Chaim LeHoRosh, a musar work.

== Early life and education ==
Shmuel Schecter was born in Lachine, Quebec, Canada. His mother died when he was four or five years old. Per his mother's request, at the age of seven he was sent to live with her brother, Rabbi Meshulam Zusha Cohen, a Torah educator in Baltimore.

At the age of 13 Schecter's uncle sent him to New York City to study at Yeshivas Rabbi Yitzchak Elchanan. Together with his new friends and fellow students Nosson Meir Wachtfogel and Avigdor Miller, he attended a secret shiur in Mesillas Yesharim given by Yaakov Yosef Herman in a yeshiva dormitory. Herman encouraged him to travel to Eastern Europe to learn at the Mir Yeshiva, which he did at age 17, having completed his four-year high school course requirements in three years by attending night school. Schecter's father paid for chavrusas (study partners) to tutor him at the Mir to bring his academic level up to that of the European students. He remained at the Mir for four years and received rabbinical ordination from the rosh yeshiva, Rabbi Eliezer Yehuda Finkel ("Reb Leizer Yudel"). He and Wachtfogel returned to New York after the death of the mashgiach, Rabbi Yerucham Levovitz, in 1936.

In 1937 Schecter married Chava Gordon in Jamaica, Queens. Right after the wedding, the two traveled to Kelm, Lithuania, so Schecter could study at the Kelm Talmud Torah. Wachtfogel also enrolled there, and the two studied under Rabbi Daniel Movshovitz and Rabbi Gershon Miadnik until 1940.

== World War II ==
In 1940 Schecter's wife and young daughter returned to the United States on the last ship to leave France. Schecter, however, wanted to keep studying under Movshovitz. Upon the urging of another student, Rabbi Aryeh Stamm, however, a beis din (rabbinical court) of three students was convened to rule that Schecter, a Canadian citizen, must leave Europe if he was able. Both Schecter and Wachtfogel, who also had Canadian citizenship, departed Lithuania in October 1940. Traveling in a group with other students from Kelm, Rabbi Eliyahu Eliezer Dessler and his wife, and Wachtfogel's bride, they took the Trans-Siberian Express across Russia to Vladivostok, and a ship to Brisbane, Australia. Their trip from Lithuania to Australia was paid for by the British government; the Board of Governors of the Australian Jewish community gave Schecter, Wachtfogel, and Wachtfogel's bride first-class tickets to depart for New York a few months later, out of concern that they would institute a religious revival in the Australian Jewish community.

The remaining students and staff of the Kelm Talmud Torah were massacred by the Nazis on July 29, 1941 (5 Av 5701). Years later, Schecter printed a commentary on Orchot Chaim LeHoRosh, a musar work, and recounted in the preface the final hours of the yeshiva and the speech given by Rabbi Movshovitz at the site of the slaughter, based on historical sources.

== Postwar ==
Schecter, Wachtfogel, and Rabbi Hershel Genauer, all alumni of the Kelm Talmud Torah, established the first kollel in the United States in White Plains, New York in spring 1942. Named Beis Medrash Govoha, the kollel opened with 20 members. Upon the arrival of Rabbi Aharon Kotler from Europe in 1943, the kollel members asked him to head the institute, which Kotler moved to Lakewood, New Jersey and expanded with a yeshiva gedola. Wachtfogel served as mashgiach of the Lakewood Yeshiva for over 50 years, until his death in 1998.

Schecter served as Kotler's emissary on a Vaad Hatzalah rescue mission in Frankfurt, Germany, in 1946. He later taught Torah and musar in New York and Boston for more than 50 years. He was the dean of Mesivta Toras Emes in Brooklyn.

== Personal life ==
Schecter and his wife, Chava Gordon, had four daughters and two sons. In his later years he and his wife moved to Israel, settling in Jerusalem. He died on Shabbat, September 30, 2000 (1 Tishrei 5761), the first day of Rosh Hashana.

== Sources ==
- Arem, Heshy (2002), "Mashgiach from a Previous Generation: Rabbi Nosson Meir Wachtfogel", in Wolpin, Rabbi Nisson (ed.), Torah Leaders: A treasury of biographical sketches, Mesorah Publications, ISBN 1-57819-773-2
- Kramer, Doniel Zvi (1984). The Day Schools and Torah Umesorah: The Seeding of Traditional Judaism in America. Yeshiva University Press.
- Rosenblum, Yonoson (2000). Rav Dessler: The life and impact of Rabbi Eliyahu Eliezer Dessler, the Michtav M'Eliyahu. Mesorah Publications, Ltd. ISBN 1-57819-506-3.
- Shain, Ruchoma (2001). All for the Boss: The Life and Impact of R' Yaakov Yosef Herman, a Torah Pioneer in America: An Affectionate Family Chronicle (Revised ed.). Feldheim Publishers. ISBN 1583304703.
- Dershowitz, Yitzchok (2005). The Legacy of Maran Rav Aharon Kotler. Feldheim Publishers. ISBN 158330875X.
