= Ruchoma Shain =

Rebbetzin Ruchoma Shain
- רוחמה שיין
- Born: Ruchoma Herman; December 6, 1914; Lower East Side, Manhattan
- Died: March 16, 2013 (aged 98); Lakewood Township, New Jersey
- Spouse: Rabbi Moshe Shain
- Children: Yisrael Meir; Mashi; Refoel Yitzchak

Ruchoma Shain (Hebrew: רוחומה שיין; 6 December 1914 – 16 March 2013) was an American-born rebbetzin, English teacher, and author. She is best known for her first book, All for the Boss (1984), a biography of her father, Yaakov Yosef Herman, which she wrote in her late sixties. In detailing her father's life, she also describes Orthodox Jewish life in America in the early 1900s. All for the Boss became one of the all-time best-sellers for Feldheim Publishers, and Shain's stories and observations are quoted by numerous authors.

Her second book, Reaching the Stars (1990), chronicles her experiences as a teacher. She also authored Dearest Children, All for the Best, and Shining Lights.

== Biography ==
Ruchoma Herman was born on New York's Lower East Side to Rabbi Yaakov Yosef and Aidel Herman. She was the youngest of her parents' five children. She had three sisters and one brother.

At seventeen years old, she married Moshe, the eldest son of Rabbi Shimon and Geneshe Shain. Shortly after their wedding, the couple, at the behest of her father, traveled to Mir, Belarus, where they spent nearly six years while her husband studied at the Mir yeshiva under Rabbis Eliezer Yehuda Finkel, Yeruchom Levovitz, and Yechezkel Levenstein. Her sister, Basya (Bessie), wife of Rabbi Chaim Pinchas Scheinberg, and her brother, Rabbi Nochum Dovid, also joined them in Mir. Later they returned to the East Side. When their children were grown, the Shains moved to Jerusalem, purchasing an apartment in the new development of Kiryat Mattersdorf.

In the United States, Shain taught English to several grades. In Jerusalem, she became a popular lecturer to women and girls. After the publication of her books, Shain received visitors seeking her counsel regarding various topics.

Shain wrote her first book, All for the Boss, in her late sixties upon the request of Yaakov Feldheim, one of the founders of Feldheim Publishers. Published in 1984, her book about growing up in New York City and the influence of her father became one of the all-time best-sellers for the publishing company, which until then had concentrated on Torah and rabbinic literature. All for the Boss was revised and expanded in 2001, and Feldheim published a "Young Readers Edition" in 2006. Feldheim translated the book into Hebrew in 2002. It was also translated into Yiddish. In 2010 a Ynet reporter called the book "one of the most read, talked about, and widely studied in the Haredi street". Shain went on to write four more books, drawing on her personal and teaching experiences.

About ten years before her death, she returned to the United States to be near her children in Adelphia, New Jersey, where she continued to welcome visitors. She died in 2013 in Lakewood Township, New Jersey.

Her children are Rabbi Yisrael Meir Shain, Mrs. Mashi Wilner, and Rabbi Refoel Yitzchak Shain.

== Influence ==
Shain's stories about her childhood, and her viewpoints on teaching, have been quoted by numerous authors.

== Bibliography ==
- All for the Boss: An Affectionate Family Chronicle of Yaakov Yosef Herman, a Torah Pioneer in America. Feldheim Publishers. 1984. ISBN 0873063465. (Revised edition published 2001
- Reaching the Stars: The Well-loved Educator and Author Reminisces on a Lifetime of Teaching—in and Out of the Classroom. Feldheim Publishers. 1990. ISBN 0873065131.
- Dearest Children. Feldheim Publishers. 1992. ISBN 0873066103.
- All for the Best. Feldheim Publishers. 1995. ISBN 0873066871.
- Shining Lights: Illuminating Stories of Faith and Inspiration. Feldheim Publishers. 1997. ISBN 0873067916.
- All for the Boss (Young Reader's ed.). Feldheim Publishers. 2006. ISBN 1583308555.
