= Pesach Stein =

Polish-American rosh yeshiva

Pesach Yitzhak Stein (1918 - 2002) was a renowned Rosh Yeshiva at the Telz Yeshiva in Cleveland, Ohio.

== Biography ==
Stein was born in Brańsk in 1918. His father, Rabbi Aharon Shmuel Stein, was the head of the Brańsk Beth Din and a student of Rabbi Shimon Shkop, who was the sandek at Pesach Yitzchok's bris.

Stein studied at the yeshiva in Brańsk, and later at the Slonim Yeshiva under Rabbi Shabsi Yogel.

In 1936 Stein went to study in the Mir Yeshiva in Poland, where he formed a close relationship with the rosh yeshiva, Rabbi Eliezer Yehuda Finkel.

With the start of World War II, Stein fled with the Mir Yeshiva to Vilna and then to Shanghai, where he spent the remainder of the war. During this time, Stein formed a relationship with the Mashgiach, Rabbi Yechezkel Levenstein.

Stein was the only member of his family who survived the Holocaust. His parents and three brothers were killed by the Nazis during the Holocaust. After the war, he joined the remainder of the Mir yeshiva students in New York City, where the yeshiva had re-opened. For a short period, he joined a group of students who went to Cincinnati, Ohio, where Rabbi Eliezer Silver had founded a yeshiva.

In 1948, Stein married Naomi Bloch, daughter of Rabbi Zalman Bloch, who had been the menahel ruchani of the Telz Yeshiva in Lithuania.

Shortly after his marriage, Stein began to deliver shiurim at the Telz Yeshiva. At the time, Rabbi Stein was the only rosh yeshiva not to have studied in Telz and so his methodology and approach to Talmudic analysis were unique to the yeshiva.

In 1988, Stein's oldest son, Rabbi Shmuel Zalman, died at the age of 38. He was the author of Pri Shmuel, and delivered a shiur at the Heichal HaTorah Yeshiva in Jerusalem.

Stein died on Friday, 10 May 2002 (28 Iyar). He was buried on the Mount of Olives beside his son, Shmuel Zalman.

He is survived by a son, Rabbi Aaron Stein, rosh yeshiva at Or Hameir Yeshiva in Peekskill, New York. One of his daughters is married to Hagaon Rabbi Yisroel Ginsburg Shlit"a, a Maggid shiur at the Yeshiva of Staten Island, and the other is married to Rabbi Avraham Doweck, a maggid shiur at the Telz Yeshiva in Cleveland.

== Published works ==
Stein's students published his Talmudic shiurim in pamphlets and other forms, among them a stenciled three-volume edition called Shiurei HaRav Pesach Stein (Lessons of Rabbi Pesach Stein). As the lectures increased, Stein responded to his students' requests and edited the pamphlets, reprinting them as a series of books called Likutei Shiurim (Collected Lessons).
