= Zalman Dolinsky =

Rabbi

Rabbi Shlomo Zalman Dolinsky רב זלמן דולינסקי

Personal life
- Born: Shlomo Zalman Katz; 1871 Alytus, Lithuania
- Died: 1911 (aged 39–40)
- Spouse: Rochel Dolinsky (née Boner)
- Education: Kelm Talmud Torah

Religious life
- Religion: Judaism
- Denomination: Orthodox Judaism

Jewish leader
- Successor: Rabbi Yerucham Levovitz
- Position: Mashgiach ruchani
- Yeshiva: Mir Yeshiva
- Yahrtzeit: תשעה ב'אב
- Residence: Radun; Shavel

Shlomo Zalman Dolinsky (1871 – 1911), sometimes known as Rabbi Zalman Radiner, was an Orthodox Jewish rabbi in Lithuania and White Russia. He served as the mashgiach ruchani of the Mir Yeshiva in Belarus.

== Biography ==
Shlomo Zalman Dolinsky was born in 1871 in Alytus, Lithuania, then part of the Russian Empire. When he was a child, his family moved to Radun where his father became the community's rabbi, and thus he was later called "Reb Zalman Dolinsky." He studied in the Talmud Torah of Kelm, and in 1896, he married Rachel Boner; they eventually settled in Shavel. About 1900, Dolinsky was appointed mashgiach ruchani in the Slabodka Yeshiva under Rabbi Nosson Tzvi Finkel.

About 1907, Dolinksy became mashgiach at the Mir Yeshiva, under Elya Baruch Kammai and Eliezer Yehudah Finkel, however he soon got sick with stomach cancer and he had to go to Germany for treatments. After three years, he died on Tisha B'Av of 1911.

== See also ==
- List of yeshivos in Europe (before World War II)
- Rabbi Eliezer Yehuda Finkel (b. 1879)
