= Kelm Talmud Torah =

Yeshiva in pre-holocaust Kelmė, Lithuania destroyed by Nazis

Coordinates: 55°38′N 22°56′E

The Kelm Talmud Torah was a famous yeshiva in pre-holocaust Kelmė, Lithuania. Unlike other yeshivas, the Talmud Torah focused primarily on the study of Musar ("Jewish ethics") and self-improvement.

== Under the Leadership of Simcha Zissel Ziv ==
The Talmud Torah was founded in the 1860s by Rabbi Simcha Zissel Ziv, known as the Alter of Kelm (the Elder of Kelm), to strengthen the study of Musar in Lithuania.

In 1872, Rabbi Ziv purchased a plot of land and erected a building for the Talmud Torah, which began as a primary school and soon became a secondary school.

In 1876, the Talmud Torah was denounced to the authorities, who began to watch it closely and to hound it. Many traditional Jews in Kelm saw Rabbi Ziv as a "reformer," as his school supported unconventional prayer practices and an unconventional, musar-focused curriculum.

The curriculum of the original Talmud Torah under Rabbi Ziv's leadership was unusual for a nineteenth-century Lithuanian yeshiva in two respects:

1. Significant time was devoted to Musar, work on the improvement of character traits. In most Lithuanian yeshivas, nearly the entire day was spent studying Talmud. By contrast, at the Talmud Torah, according to Menahem Glenn, "Musar was the chief study, while the study of Talmud was only of minor importance and little time was devoted to it."
2. In addition to Jewish subjects, students studied general subjects such as geography, mathematics, and Russian language and literature for three hours a day. The Kelm Talmud Torah was the first traditional yeshiva in the Russian empire to give such a focus to general studies.

Under pressure from the Jews of Kelm, Rabbi Ziv decided to open his school elsewhere: he re-established it in Grobin, in the Courland province.

In 1881, Rabbi Ziv returned to Kelm, where the Talmud Torah became an advanced academy for the study of Torah and Musar. Most of the students who came to study at the Talmud Torah were married. Entry to the Talmud Torah was difficult and restricted to select students from other yeshivas, who had to bring letters of recommendation from their Rosh Yeshiva. Students were chosen after they passed rigorous examinations on Musar. At its peak, the Talmud Torah had a student body of between 30 and 35 members.

Rabbi Ziv established a group that was known as "Devek Tov," comprising his foremost students. He shared a special relationship with the group's members and he worked on writing out his discourses for them.

== The Talmud Torah after Ziv's death ==
Simcha Zissel Ziv died in 1898. Upon his death, his brother Rabbi Aryeh Leib Broida became the new director of the Talmud Torah. Aryeh Leib moved to the land of Israel in 1903, and his son Rabbi Tzvi Hirsch Broida (also Simcha Zissel Ziv's son-in-law) became the new director of the Talmud Torah.

After Tzvi Hirsch Broida's death in 1913, Simcha Zissel's son Rabbi Nahum Ze'ev Ziv became the new director of the Talmud Torah.

After Nahum Ze'ev Ziv's death in 1916, Simcha Zissel's student Rabbi Reuven Dov Dessler became the new director. He was succeeded by Simcha Zissel's sons-in-law, Rabbi Daniel Movshovitz and Rabbi Gershon Miadnik.

On June 23, 1941, Nazi forces entered Kelm. Shortly after, the faculty and students of the Talmud Torah were murdered by the Nazis and their collaborators and are buried in a mass grave in the fields of the Grozhebiski farm.

== Notable students ==
The Mashgichim in many of the yeshivas in Poland and Lithuania were students of the Talmud Torah of Kelm. Some were:

- Rabbi Nosson Tzvi Finkel of Slabodka
- Rabbi Eliyahu Eliezer Dessler of Ponevezh Yeshiva
- Rabbi Yosef Yoizel Hurwitz of Novardok Yeshiva
- Rabbi Yechezkel Levenstein in Mir and then later in Ponevezh Yeshiva
- Rabbi Yeruchom Levovitz of Mir
- Rabbi Zalman Dolinsky of Slabodka and Mir Yeshiva (Belarus)
- Rabbi Yosef Leib Nenedik in Kletzk
- Rabbi Moshe Rosenstein in Łomża
- Rabbi Naftoli Trop of Radun
- Rabbi Nosson Meir Wachtfogel, mashgiach ruchani of Beth Medrash Govoha, Lakewood, New Jersey
- Rabbi Elyah Lopian of the Knesses Chizkiyahu Yeshiva in Kfar Hasidim, Israel.
- Rabbi Hayyim Yitzhak HaCohen Bloch, Honorary President of the Union of Orthodox Rabbis of the United States and Canada.

Other notable students:

- Shmuel Schecter, co-founder, Beth Medrash Govoha
