= Moshe Rosenstain =

Lithuanian rabbi

Rabbi Moshe Rosenstain רבי משה רוזנשטיין

Personal life
- Born: 1881 Užventis, Lithuania
- Died: 1940 (aged 58–59)

Religious life
- Religion: Judaism
- Yeshiva: Lomza Yeshiva
- Position: Mashgiach ruchani
- Began: 1912
- Ended: 1940
- Main work: Ahavas Meishorim
- Yahrtzeit: (י"ד ניסן (ערב פסח

Rabbi Moshe Rosenstain (Hebrew: רבי משה רוזנשטיין 1881–1940) was an Ashkenazi rabbi in pre-World War II Eastern Europe. He served as mashgiach ruchani in the Lomza Yeshiva in Poland.

== Early life ==
Rabbi Rosenstain was born in Uzvent, Lithuania in 1881. As a teenage student, he studied in the Telshe Yeshiva under Rabbi Shimon Shkop. Rabbi Rosenshtain's mother was the shadchan (matchmaker) between their next door neighbor and R' Yerucham Levovitz, who would later become the mashgiach in the Mir Yeshiva. At age nineteen, Moshe came home from yeshiva for Pesach and met R' Yerucham, with whom he became very close to in the ensuing weeks and months. R' Yerucham was a major baal mussar (literally "master of ethics," here referring to someone who studies ethical works intensely and works tirelessly in self-improvement), a product of the Kelm Talmud Torah, and shared Torah thoughts with Moshe. Three years later, Rabbi Levovitz brought him to learn in the Kelm Talmud Torah. He grew to become a major teacher of mussar.

== Lomza Yeshiva ==
In 1912, Rabbi Rosenstain was appointed mashgiach ruchani of the Lomza Yeshiva in Poland, a position he held for the rest of his life. His saintliness and integrity in the yeshiva was part of what made it unique. In fact, he fasted for thirty years, eating only at night after completing maariv, and on Shabbos and holidays. He walked down the aisle between the shtenders in the yeshiva's beis midrash (study hall) for hours, and the Lomza yeshiva's beis midrash was exceedingly long. He explained, "It takes me many hours of thinking to come up with one pure thought."

Rabbi Rosenstain slept in the yeshiva's dormitory during the week. He was also very involved in helping his students when the Polish government wanted to draft yeshiva students. His sefarim, Yesodei Hadas and Ahavas Meisharim, contain transcripts of his mussar talks. He died the day before Pesach in 1940, at the age of 59.
