= Yaakov Yosef Herman =

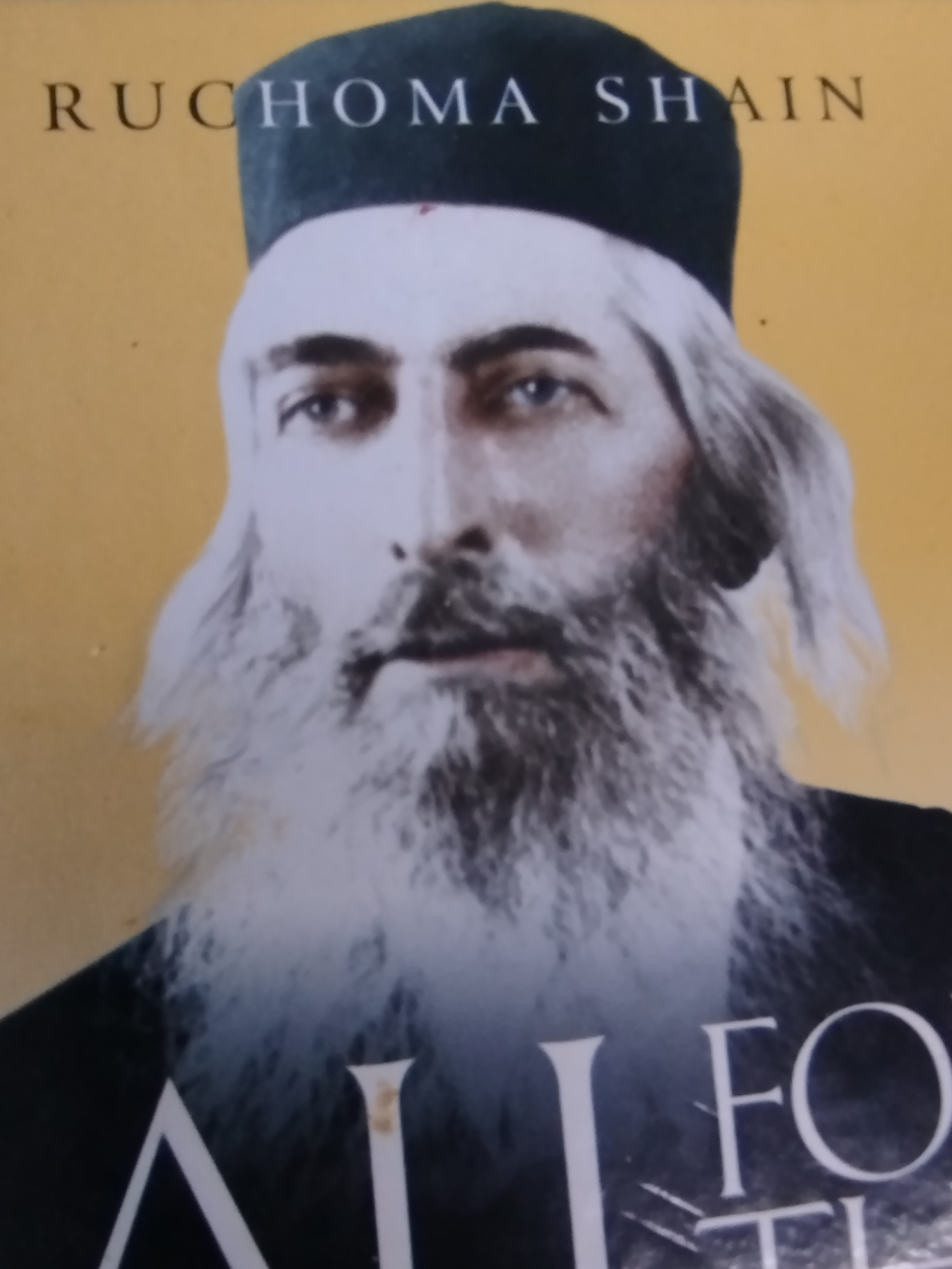
- Born: Yaakov Yosef Herman; 1880; Slutsk, Belarus
- Died: 25 July 1967 (age 87); Jerusalem, Israel
- Known for: Orthodox Jewish pioneer in America
- Spouses: Aidel Andron; Mirel
- Children: Esther; Freida; Nochum Dovid; Bessie; Ruchoma
- Parent(s): Rabbi Yitzchok Isaac and Minna Rivka Herman

Yaakov Yosef Herman (1880–1967) was an Orthodox Jewish pioneer in the United States in the early 20th century. A native of Slutsk, Belarus, he immigrated with his parents and younger sister to New York City at the age of 8 and was left on his own five years later after his family returned to Russia. Following his marriage, Herman became known for feeding and lodging dozens of people in his home, including visiting European rabbis seeking kosher meals. He displayed a staunch commitment to mitzvah observance at a time that many abandoned their faith, and urged promising young Jewish men to pursue advanced Torah study in the great yeshivas of Europe, including his son-in-law, Rabbi Chaim Pinchas Scheinberg (1910–2012). For his promulgation of Torah values to his co-religionists, Herman was called the "Chofetz Chaim of America" by Rabbi Boruch Ber Leibowitz, the Kaminetz rosh yeshiva, who lived with the Hermans for two years while he was fundraising in the United States. Herman's youngest daughter, Ruchoma Shain (1914–2013), immortalized his exploits in All for the Boss: The life and impact of R' Yaakov Yosef Herman, a Torah pioneer in America: An affectionate family chronicle, first published by Feldheim in 1984.

== Early life ==
Herman was the eldest child of Rabbi Yitzchok Isaac Herman and his wife, Minna Rivka. His father was his primary teacher until his bar mitzvah.

Finding it difficult to earn a living in Russia and believing that it would be easier to do so in America, his father emigrated with his wife, son, and daughter Molly in 1888. But in New York City, he was unable to find work as a private rebbi (teacher), and could not keep other jobs because he refused to work on Shabbat (the Jewish Sabbath). Five years later, he decided to return to Russia. He did not have enough travel fare for all the members of the family, so Yaakov Yosef, at age 13, was left behind with cousins until money could be saved for his fare.

Yaakov Yosef earned $1.25 a week working as a handy-boy in a Shabbat-observant fur shop in New York City. His cousins charged him $1 a week for room and board. A few weeks later, they raised his rent to $1.25. Feeling betrayed, he spent Shabbat alone in a park, where he promised himself that he would host poor and homeless people in his home after he married. After Shabbat ended, he moved to a rooming house. At work, he advanced from handy-boy to apprentice to professional worker, and four years later he was able to send money for his parents, sister, and newborn brother to join him. He was able to support his family in New York City on his salary, enabling his father to work as a rebbi.

At age 21 Herman met his future wife, Aidel, daughter of Rabbi Shmuel Yitzchok Andron (one of the founders of Rabbi Jacob Joseph School), on a shidduch. At first Herman's mother nixed the match, since Aidel's father could not afford a dowry. A few months later, Herman bumped into Aidel's brother Yankel Leib, who asked why he had ended the shidduch. Herman explained his mother's demand and Yankel Leib suggested that Herman give him $2,000, which he would present to Herman as the "dowry" on the night of the engagement. The shidduch was concluded successfully, and the couple was married on 29 December 1903. They had four daughters and one son.

== Open house ==
Herman told his bride that he wished to have an open house in which guests would be welcome for Shabbat and Jewish holidays, and she agreed. Thus began their "business" of hachnasos orchim (hospitality to guests). Dozens dined at the Herman table each week, including men with social and emotional disabilities whom no one else wanted as guests. Many great rabbis from Europe stayed with the Hermans while visiting the United States. Noteworthy among them were Rabbi Boruch Ber Leibowitz, rosh yeshivas Kaminetz, and his son-in-law, Rabbi Reuven Grozovsky, who stayed with the Hermans for two years; Rabbi Eliezer Yehuda Finkel, Mir rosh yeshiva; Rabbi Avraham Kalmanowitz; and Rabbi Eliyahu Eliezer Dessler. The latter wrote to his father, Rabbi Reuven Dov Dessler, about his host during the summer of 1930:

He is a businessman brought up in America. But he is an outstanding y'rei Shamayim (God-fearing man), who observes the mitzvos of the Torah meticulously. He influences many people and guides them to become observant Jews. Reb Yaakov Yosef is known for strict adherence to the mitzvah of hachnasos orchim. On Shabbos, there are approximately twenty guests at his table.

Herman lost his wholesale fur business and most of his savings in the 1929 stock market crash. Yet he continued to provide kosher meals and lodging for many guests in his home.

== Mitzvah pioneer ==
At a time when Orthodox observance was lax among Jews in America, Herman upheld his mitzvah observance even in the face of ridicule. He often said, "I am a soldier of the Boss, and I obey His commands". He spoke out publicly against mixed dancing and mixed beaches, and led public protests against Sabbath desecration by pushcart peddlers on the Lower East Side. For his eldest daughter's wedding in 1922, he took the unheard-of step of printing on the invitation: "Ladies, please come dressed according to the Jewish law". At the entrance to the wedding hall, he had one relative hand out shawls to women who were not properly dressed, while another relative passed out cards that read: "Men and women are asked to dance separately". Inside the hall, Herman posted a large sign that read: "All the food belongs to the Lord; after the brocho, to you". Many guests were affronted by such forthright requests, which were not widespread practice in Orthodox circles at that time. While Herman's scrupulous adherence to Jewish law sometimes frustrated his children, since their religious friends did not subscribe to the same high standards, they were nevertheless proud of their father's strength and commitment.

Herman encouraged others to improve their mitzvah observance by providing a shatnez-checking service; arranging for the production of Cholov Yisroel (Jewish supervised) milk, eighteen-minute matzos and other kosher-for-Passover products; and anonymously printing Jewish calendars that listed candle-lighting times for Shabbat and Jewish holidays. During the Prohibition era, he produced kosher wine in his home to ensure that other Jewish families could celebrate Shabbat and Jewish holidays according to Jewish law. He was summoned to court for his winemaking operation, but successfully argued his case that he was acting solely for religious purposes. The judge dismissed the case, and Herman continued producing and selling wine at cost until the Prohibition law was repealed.

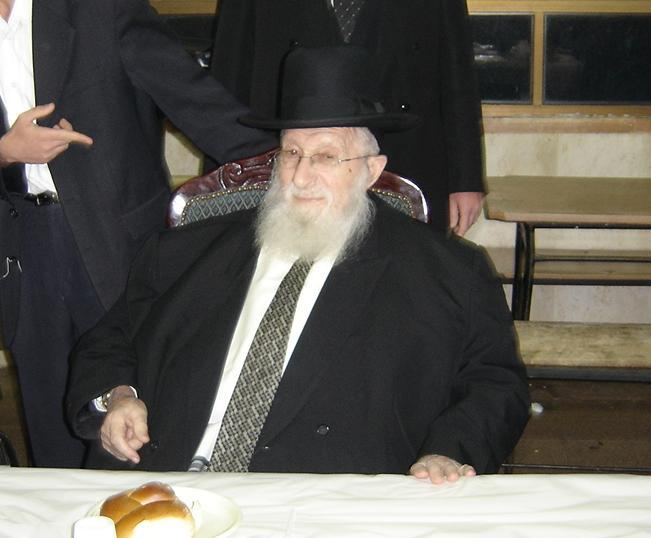
Rabbi Chaim Pinchas Scheinberg, one of the American boys whom Herman influenced to advance in Torah study.

At the suggestion of his father-in-law, Herman had undertaken formal Torah learning with private rabbis after his marriage. This enabled him to deliver beginning and advanced shiurim (Torah lectures) to men and teach religious subjects to Jewish boys in the synagogue after evening prayers. He was also asked to give private mussar talks to yeshiva students. Witnessing the paucity of advanced Torah education in New York City in the 1930s and 1940s, Herman encouraged promising American Jewish youth to travel to the great yeshivas of Europe. He sent approximately 50 young men to the Mir yeshiva in Poland and other European yeshivas. Among the American boys he influenced were Chaim Pinchas Scheinberg, Baruch Kaplan (founder of the Bais Yaakov movement in America), Shachne Zohn (future rosh yeshiva in Torah Vodaas) Shmuel Schecter, and Avigdor Miller. Herman met Scheinberg when the latter was 14 years old and decided that the youth would make a good husband for his third daughter, Bessie (Basha), who was then only 12. When Scheinberg was 19, Herman suggested the match with his 17-year-old daughter and Scheinberg's parents agreed. With the encouragement of his father-in-law, Scheinberg and his new wife spent their first five years of marriage in the town of Mir, Belarus (then Poland). They lived next-door to the Mir yeshiva, where Scheinberg immersed himself in Torah study. Herman also sent his son, Nochum Dovid, and his wife to Mir right after their marriage, as well as his daughter Ruchoma and her new husband, Moshe Shain.

== Move to Israel ==
Herman and his wife decided to make aliyah to the Land of Israel in August 1939. They arrived on 1 September, the day World War II broke out in Europe. Theirs was the last passenger ship to leave the United States before the war started.

Herman bought a key money apartment in the Zikhron Moshe neighborhood of Jerusalem, where he continued to invite dozens of guests to his Shabbat table. He gave a nightly shiur (Torah lecture) in the Zikhron Moshe synagogue, as well as talks in other synagogues on Shabbat. He was considered the "spiritual leader" of the Zikhron Moshe synagogue.

Following the death of his wife Aidel in 1946, Herman remarried to Mirel, a widow with two married children. He opened a store selling mezuzahs, tefillin, and Torah scrolls in the Mea Shearim neighborhood, and also headed a loan society and charity fund.

In 1964 both he and his second wife were weakened by illness. Herman moved in with his son and daughter-in-law in Jerusalem, while Mirel moved in with her daughter in Bnei Brak. Mirel died in late 1966. Herman died of pneumonia on 25 July 1967 (17 Tamuz 5727) at the age of 87. He was buried on Har HaMenuchot.

== Sources ==
- Brog, Rabbi Shmuel (2002), "Remembering Rav Avigdor Miller", in Wolpin, Rabbi Nisson (ed.), Torah Leaders: A treasury of biographical sketches, New York: Mesorah Publications Ltd., ISBN 1-57819-773-2
- Finkelman, Shimon (1991). Shabbos. Mesorah Publications. ISBN 0899066011.
- Rosenblum, Yonason (2000). Rav Dessler: The life and impact of Rabbi Eliyahu Eliezer Dessler the Michtav m'Eliyahu. Mesorah Publications. ISBN 1578195063.
- Shain, Ruchoma (1984). All for the Boss: An affectionate family chronicle of Yaakov Yosef Herman, a Torah pioneer in America. Feldheim Publishers. ISBN 0-87306-346-5.
- Silber, David (2002). Noble Lives, Noble Deeds. Vol. 1. Mesorah Publications. ISBN 1578195861.
- Teller, Hanoch (1992). Give Peace A Stance: Stories and advice on promoting and maintaining peace. Feldheim. ISBN 1881939006.
