= Shlomo Wolbe =

Haredi rabbi (1914–2005)

- שלמה וולבה
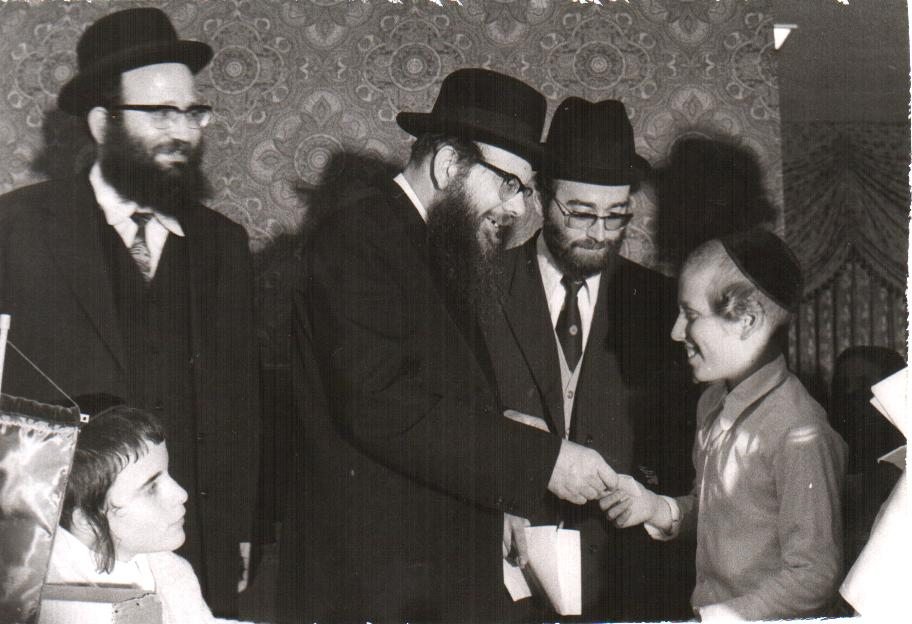
- Born: August Wilhelm; 1914; Berlin, Germany
- Died: April 25, 2005 (aged 90–91); Jerusalem, Israel
- Education: University of Berlin
- Occupation: Rabbi
- Years active: 1946–2005
- Spouse: Rivka Grodzinski
- Parents: Eugen Wolbe (father); Rosa (mother)

Rabbi Shlomo Wolbe (August Wilhelm, 1914 – April 25, 2005) was a Haredi rabbi born in Berlin in the early part of the twentieth century. He is best known as the author of Alei Shur (Hebrew: עלי שור), a musar classic discussing dimensional growth as it pertains to students of the Talmud. He died in Jerusalem in 2005.

== Life and teaching positions ==
Shlomo Wolbe (August Wilhelm) was born in Berlin to Eugen and Rosa Wolbe. He was raised in a secular Jewish home and received his education at the University of Berlin (1930–1933). During his university studies he became a baal teshuva through the efforts of the Orthodox Students Union V.A.D. (Vereinigung jüdischer Akademiker in Deutschland). After university he attended the Hildesheimer Rabbinical Seminary and Rabbi Joseph Breuer's yeshiva in Frankfurt. He continued to study at Rabbi Boczko's yeshiva in Montreux, Switzerland. He then attended the Mir yeshiva in Poland, where he became a student of the mashgiach ruchani, Rabbi Yeruchom Levovitz, and, to a lesser extent of Rabbi Yechezkel Levenstein.

While in the Mir, Wolbe befriended a young man from Stockholm, Sweden, Bert Lehmann, son of Hans (Chaim) and Fannie Lehmann. During World War II, Wolbe, who was a German national, was in danger of deportation and could not follow the Mir yeshiva into Russia. Hans Lehmann invited Wolbe to stay with his family and be the Jewish teacher for his sons. Wolbe thus was able to spend the war years in neutral Sweden. While he was in Sweden, he functioned there as a rabbi. During the war he worked for the US-based Vaad Hahazalah in coordination with Rabbi Jacob Israel Zuber, Rabbi Benjamin Zeev Jakobsohn and Rabbi Abraham Israel Jacobson. At the end of the war he created a girls school for refugees in Lidingö. There, he wrote pamphlets on Judaism in Swedish and German.

Wolbe moved to Mandatory Palestine in 1946 and studied at Yeshivas Lomzha in Petah Tikva. He then married Rivka Grodzinski, the daughter of Rabbi Avraham Grodzinski, of the Slabodka yeshiva (Rivka died on October 25, 2018), making him brothers-in-law with Hagoan Rabbi Chaim Kreiswirth of Belgium. Wolbe continued his studies at Kollel Toras Eretz Yisroel in Petach Tikva under Rabbi Yitzchok Katz. In 1948, Wolbe took over a small yeshiva belonging to a youth organization called Ezra. Two years later, he was joined by Rabbi Moshe Shmuel Shapiro of Brisk. The yeshiva was located in the small town of Be'er Yaakov, and was known as the Be'er Yaakov Yeshiva. Shapiro became the rosh yeshiva and Wolbe became the mashgiach ruchani. For more than 30 years, until 1981, Wolbe served as the menahel ruchani of Yeshivas Be'er Yaakov.

Later, he served as mashgiach in the Lakewood Yeshiva in Eretz Yisroel before opening Yeshivas Givat Shaul, a house of learning specializing in mussar. During these post-1981 years, Wolbe gave mussar talks in various yeshivot as well as small groups. He created many "mussar houses." The Bais Mussar was named with the support of Manfred Lehmann (son of Hans Lehmann) in memory of Chaim (Jamie) Lehmann, who had died in 1982.

== Views on child education ==
Wolbe opposed hitting children; this, in light of the weakening generations in understanding the biblical verse (Proverbs 13:24) advising "spare the rod spoil the child."

Known for being a lifelong reader of many disciplines such as secular psychology and educational theory, Wolbe created his own educational philosophy for the greater community. In his important work on education Zeriah u'Binyan beChinnuch ("Planting and Building in Education") he presents an adaptation and paraphrase of John Dewey's Democracy and Education (1916), in which Dewey presented the tension of rote learning and a democratic individualism. For Wolbe, the educator needs to "build" the students on the firm ground of Torah, the community, and Haredi yeshiva values, yet at the same time allow the students to "grow," each in their own personal and individual way.

Wolbe emphasized the great stress Torah places on the individuality of every child and every situation. In his discussion of prayer he states:

Each davening performed with understanding is a qualitatively different experience and has its own unique feeling and quality. It is indeed impossible that two tefillos should be identical - even though the words are identical. One can compare this to riding a train watching a beautiful landscape. Although the scenery may appear the same, the experience is different from moment to moment. At each moment, one sees the scenery from a different perspective. Similarly, someone davening should constantly see himself and his relationship with Hashem from a different perspective - just as the traveler is looking at the scenery with a different, fresh perspective (Alei Shur I:2).

If one accepts that the Torah is from Sinai then one must accept that Torah study is so powerful that it can produce a human being who has superior understanding and wisdom in both heavenly and worldly matters (Alei Shur vol. I p. 295).

== Mussar approach ==
He published his first volume of Alei Shur in 1966, which contains his mussar ("ethics") analysis on a proper regimented life of a yeshiva student. The second volume published 20 years after the first was an intense glimpse into his actual mussar workshops for developing elevated character traits. The book contains step by step instructions and specific exercises.

Rabbi Wolbe puts much emphasis on Seder or having a schedule in order to fully utilize one's capabilities. He actually devotes a section in each volume of Alei Shur to the topic. Wolbe believed that the student should not rely on habit or emotions, rather they should structure their lives. "The greater the person is, the more organized is his life." (Alei Shur, Pg. 68)

In Alei Shur volume 2: Mussar chapter 5, he presents the core of his method: The continuous need to better oneself in the everyday. He calls this better of deepening Hislamdus ("teaching oneself"), a non-ego learning from things. Wolbe's method will slowly train one to contemplate nature, one's surroundings, political events, and one's home life:

There is nothing in creation that one cannot learn from, because that is why the blessed Holy One created so many things. As our sages already said, "Had the Torah not been given, we would learn modesty from the cat…." (Tractate Eruvin 100b) In this way, we learn something from all living things three times a day. If there is nothing to learn from them in behavior, we will learn to see in them the wisdom of the Creator. (Fifth Va'ad) A yeshiva was a place where one learns to live, not just to learn (Pg. 31). One cannot learn Torah with bad character traits such as hate, competition, or jealousy.

Wolbe felt that there are four basic areas aside from the regular Gemara curriculum of the yeshiva that the yeshiva student should master.

1. He must know the Halakha (Jewish law) that affects him through the Mishnah Berurah.
2. He should know Chumash with the commentaries of Rashi and Ramban as a basis for one's hashkafah.
3. He should know Pirkei Avos with the commentary of Rabbeinu Yonah (a cousin of Nachmanides) as a basic primer in acceptable character traits (midos).
4. He should know Mesillat Yesharim (by Rabbi Moshe Chaim Luzzatto) which he calls "the ultimate compendium dictionary for midos." It must constantly be delved into.

== Political positions ==
His work Ben sheshet le-Asor ("Between [the] Sixth [of] to [the] Tenth [of]"), now renamed "Olam Hayedidus" ("a world of friendship" i.e. between God and mankind) offers his views on the meaning of Jewish politics and changes to Jewish life resulting from the Six-Day War until the Yom Kippur War.

This book is a collection of lectures and talks he gave to non-religious in Kibbutzim and to soldiers in the IDF. It also contains a selection of opinion letters he wrote regarding contemporary issues in the Jewish world. He kept a distance from Zionism viewing the Charedi community as a continuity of the Old Yishuv. He even quotes Gershom Scholem that Zionism is the direct outgrowth of Sabbatianism to prove his point. In this book he takes issue with the position in the Agudah newspaper Hamodia, that the state of Israel is a vessel for leading a Charedi life. The state of Israel did not contribute to Charedi life. For Wolbe, the state is entirely heretical and even Israel Independence Day should not be recognized. The state gets no credit for providing any Jewish culture since Biblical studies, archaeology, and Jewish history are entirely secular. He states that he agrees with the anti-Zionism of the Satmar Rav, but thinks that it is still permissible to enter the government and to receive money from it.

In the post 1967 world, he envisioned that people would become ba'alei teshuva and there would be a great movement in Israel of people returning to their Jewish heritage. Rabbi Wolbe's grandchildren spearhead major American and Israeli Jewish outreach efforts; notably Rabbi Eliezer Wolbe who heads his grandfather's Bais HaMussar and Vaad Chizuk in Jerusalem, Rabbi Aryeh Wolbe of TORCH in Houston, Texas, Rabbi Yaakov Wolbe whose website and classes are a reflection of his grandfather's love and yearning of teaching Torah to the Jewish masses, and Rabbi Yechiel Erlanger of Denver, Colorado.

== Publications ==
- Daat Shlomo: Talks on Mattan Torah, Jerusalem 2006.
- Igrot u-chetavim / mi ha-mashgiach; Yerushalayim : 2005.
- Planting & building : raising a Jewish child / Shlomo Wolbe; translated by Leib Kelemen; Jerusalem; New York : Feldheim Publishers, 1999 (Translation of Zeriah u-vinyan ba-chinuch)
- Translation of Zerichah u-vinyan ba-chinuch : sichot be-inyenei chinuch Yerushalaim : Feldheim, 5756, 1995.
- Kuntres hadrachah le-chalot; divrei mavo Shmuel Barelbach. Bnei Brak, 1976
- Ma'amarei Hadracha L'chosonim (1999)
- Shalhevetyah : chamishah asar pirchei hadrachah le-toch olam ha-Torah. (1979)
- Ben sheshet le-asor (1979), now renamed "Olam Hayedidus" ("a world of friendship" i.e. between God and mankind)
- Sefer Alei shur sha'arei ha-hadrachah (1968–1998)
- Uppfostran till Judendom (Sällskapet för Judisk Religiös Bildning, Stockholm, 1945)
- Pirkei Kinyan Da'as (2001)
- Pathways : a brief introduction to the world of Torah / Shlomo Wolbe; trans. by M. Samsonowitz Jerusalem : Jamie Lehmann Torah Ethics Center, c1983
