= Chaim Leib Shmuelevitz =

Lithuanian-Belarusian Orthodox rabbi

Chaim Leib Shmuelevitz חיים לייב שמואלביץ
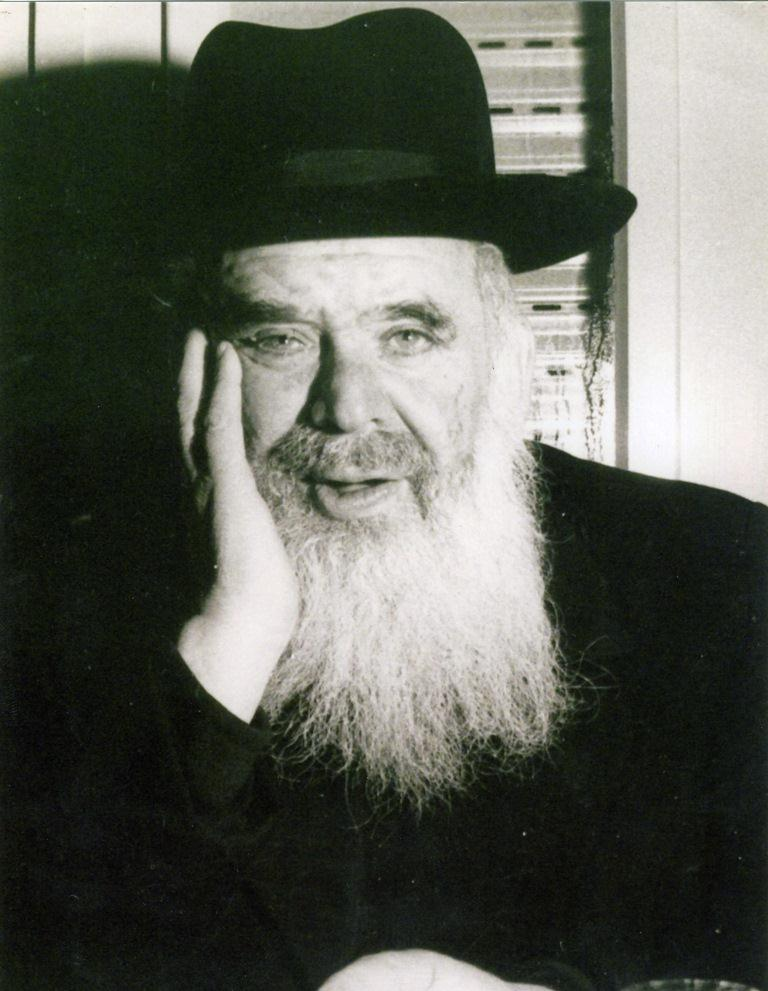

Personal life
- Born: 3 October 1902 Kaunas, Lithuania
- Died: 2 January 1979 (aged 76) Jerusalem, Israel
- Buried: Har HaMenuchot

Religious life
- Religion: Judaism

Chaim Leib Halevi Shmuelevitz, (Hebrew: חיים לייב שמואלביץ; 1902–1979) — also spelled Shmulevitz — was a member of the faculty of the Mirrer Yeshiva for more than 40 years, in Poland, Shanghai and Jerusalem, serving as Rosh yeshiva during its sojourn in Shanghai from 1941 to 1947, and again in the Mirrer Yeshiva in Jerusalem from 1965 to 1979. He taught, guided, and inspired thousands of disciples throughout his lifetime, by word and deed, with legendary diligence and intensity in Torah study.

== Early years ==
Shmuelevitz was born on the second day of Rosh Hashana 5663 (3 October 1902) in Kovno, Lithuania, to Rabbi Refoel Alter Shmuelevitz and Ettel (née Horowitz), a daughter of Rabbi Yosef Yozel Horwitz, known as the Alter of Novhardok.

In Shmuelevitz's youth, his family moved to Stutchin. Until the age of 16, he was educated by his father, who was one of the leading yeshiva lecturers in Lithuania. In 1919 Refoel Alter, who was then the rosh yeshiva of Shaar HaTorah in Grodno, died suddenly. Within a very short time, his mother died too, orphaning Shmuelevitz, his younger brother Shlomo, and two sisters.

Refoel Alter's position at the yeshiva was taken up by Shimon Shkop. Shmuelevitz developed a close bond with Shkop. At the age of 18, Shmuelevitz's mentor invited him to deliver the third-level shiur in the preparatory academy at the yeshiva. Shmuelevitz held this position for a few years before transferring to the yeshiva in Mir. Many of his students of those years later became great Torah leaders, and his own four years in Grodno with Shkop had a profound influence on his approach to Talmudic analysis.

At the age of 22, Shmuelevitz headed a group of students who transferred from Grodno to Mir. In accordance with the contemporary practice in the yeshiva world, Shmuelevitz became known as Chaim Stutchiner, after the shtetl in which he grew up. The Mirrer rosh yeshiva, Eliezer Yehuda Finkel, set his sights on Shmuelevitz as his eventual spiritual heir. He set the seal on this future appointment by offering his student the hand of his daughter in marriage.

Shmuelevitz married Chana Miriam, the rosh yeshiva's daughter, on the last day of Hanukkah, 3 Tevet 5690 (3 January 1930). A few years later, at the relatively young age of 31, Shmuelevitz was appointed as a maggid shiur, delivering regular lectures. Shmuelevitz's lectures were modeled on the study strategy of his mentor, Shkop, personalized in a style of his own. The hallmark of his lectures was depth combined with breadth; it was not uncommon for him to cite 20 or 30 different sources from far-flung corners of the Talmud and its commentaries during a single class. These classes attracted a wide audience, including some of the most advanced students in Mir.

== World War II ==
With the outbreak of World War II, Mir Yeshiva was forced into exile. The students and faculty fled from Mir to Vilna, where they stayed for about two months, after which they moved to Keidan, where they managed to set up the yeshiva once more in 1940. After being ordered out of Keidan seven months later by the Communist authorities, the yeshiva divided into four groups, each numbering between eighty and one hundred students. Shmuelevitz's classes continued virtually without interruption throughout the early period of World War II, while when the yeshiva was continually in transit. In late 1940, hundreds of Mir yeshiva students obtained visas from Chiune Sugihara to travel via Siberia and Vladivostok to Japan.

The yeshiva stayed in Kobe, Japan, for about six months, and then relocated to Shanghai for the next five years. Although living conditions were extremely difficult, the yeshiva prospered. As Eliezer Yehuda Finkel had gone to Palestine to obtain visas for the yeshiva and was forced to remain there, Shmuelevitz and the mashgiach, Yechezkel Levenstein, assumed responsibility for the day-to-day running of the yeshiva.

== Shanghai ==
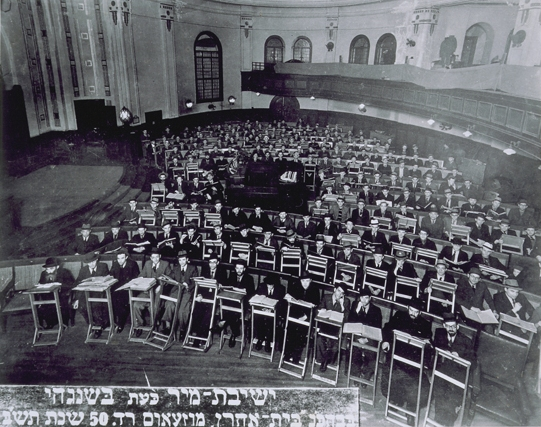
The yeshiva in the Beth Aharon Synagogue, Shanghai; Shmuelevitz is seated in the front row, second from right

Somehow, Rav Shmuelevitz became responsible for the financial needs of all Jewish learning institutions in the city, not just his own. These included contingents of the famed yeshivas of Kamenetz, Kletzk, Lubavitch, and Lublin. This was despite the fact that exchanging foreign currency in Shanghai was fraught with danger and Shmuelevitz lived with a perpetual fear of being apprehended by the authorities.

A short while after arriving in Shanghai, Shmuelevitz received American visas only for himself and his family. He refused them, saying that he would leave only when all the students had received their visas. This ultimately meant staying in Shanghai for five and a half years.

These and other details were part of the 1966 testimony given by Shmulevitz and his wife to Yad VaShem.

== Move to Jerusalem ==
In 1947 the yeshiva moved again — as always, as a single unit — this time, to the United States, where Shmuelevitz spent six months before rejoining his father-in-law, Finkel, in the Mirrer Yeshiva in Jerusalem. For the next 32 years, until his death in 1978, Shmuelevitz remained in Mir-Jerusalem.

He became active in Agudath Israel in Israel, and its Moetzes Gedolei HaTorah (Council of Torah Sages) on which he served. He also became the father-in-law of Nochum Partzovitz, his successor as rosh yeshiva.

== Personality ==
Shmuelevitz was well known for his ability to become totally engrossed in his Torah study for hours at a time. His ethical discourses, many of which have been published in English, are considered classics. They offer novel interpretations and reveal his penetrating insights into human nature.

Shmuelevitz had great respect for his father and he quoted him often in both Torah lectures and mussar discourses. He considered his father's handwritten Torah chiddushim (new Torah insights) his most valued possessions. During the Six-Day War, when the yeshiva was within range of Jordanian artillery fire, Shmuelevitz sent some of the manuscripts to America with his uncle, Avraham Yoffen, with specific instructions that he carry them by hand and not put them in his luggage, because, "Dos iz meyn gantze leben (This is my whole life)."

== Family ==
His youngest son, Meir Shmulevitz, lives in Kiryat Mattersdorf, Jerusalem, and his son Avrohom is a Rosh mesivta at the Mirrer Yeshiva. Both were born in Israel. His son Rafael Halevi Shmuelevitz (1937 - 2016) was a co-Rosh Yeshiva of Mir Yeshiva in Jerusalem. His daughter Rivka, who died in 2019, was married to Yitzchok Ezrachi.

== Final days ==
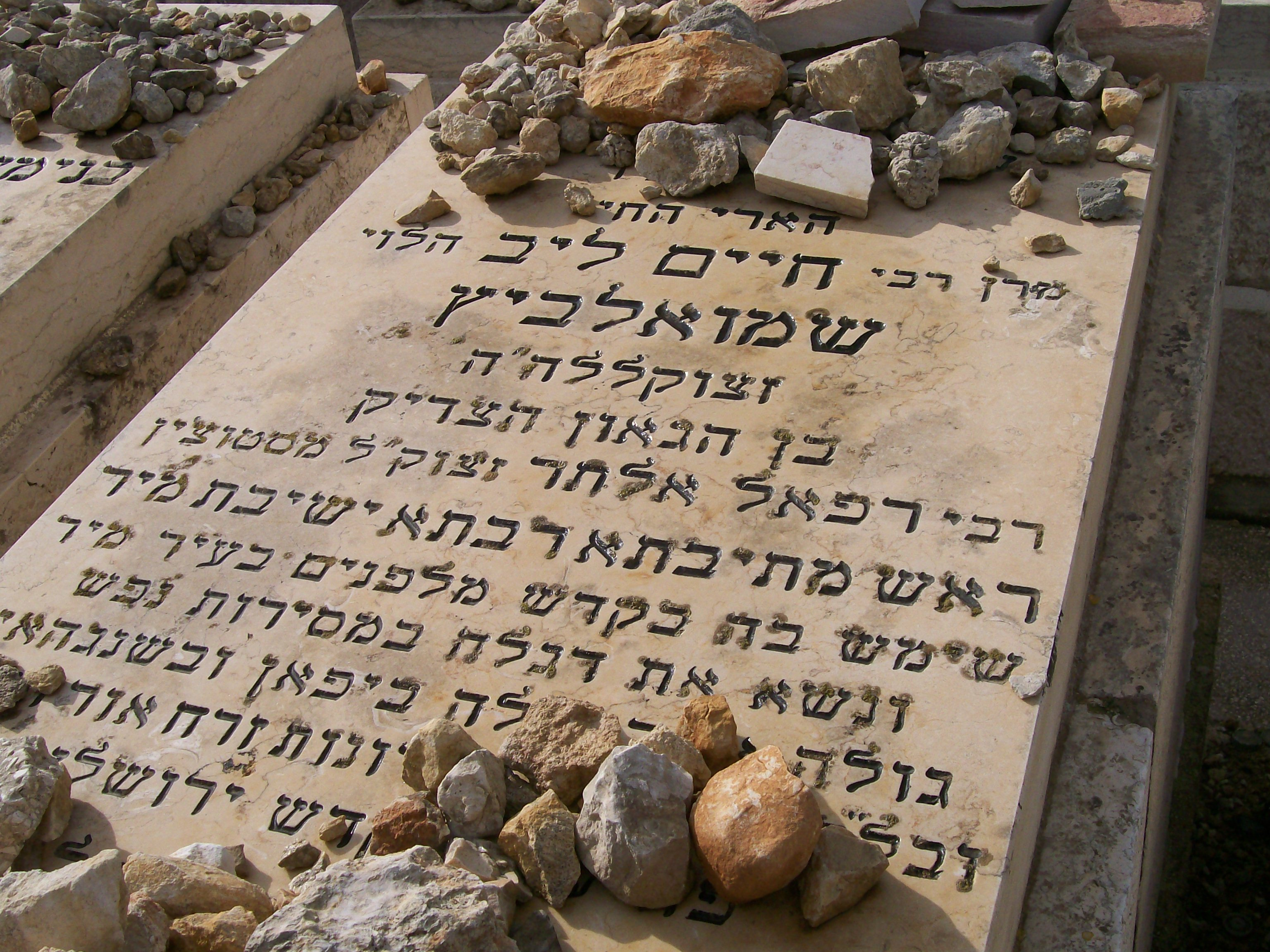
His gravesite at Har HaMenuchot.

A few days after Sukkot 1978, Shmuelevitz was rushed to the hospital and, for the next two months, was gravely ill. Moshe Feinstein said, "The world rested upon Reb Chaim's shoulders." Jews worldwide prayed for his recovery. Two months later on the third of Tevet, Shmuelevitz died at the age of 76. Nearly 100,000 mourners attended his funeral. He is buried on Har HaMenuchot.

During his lifetime, Shmuelevitz committed to paper his every lecture and public address, leaving behind at his death thousands of handwritten pages, including chiddushim on every tractate of the Talmud.

== Audio lectures ==
- MP3 classes given by Shmuelevitz

== Publications ==
- Sichos Mussar – Ethical discourses, reprinted as Sichos Mussar: Reb Chaim's Discourses: The Shmuessen of the Mirrer Rosh Yeshiva, Rav Chaim Shmulevitz. Brooklyn: Mesorah Publications, 1989. ISBN 0-89906-943-6.
