= Moshe Yehuda Blau =

German-American rabbi and writer

Rabbi Chaim Moshe Yehuda Hakohen Blau

Personal life
- Born: 15 October 1912 Hamburg, Germany
- Died: 2003 (aged 90–91)
- Parent(s): Dr. Yirmiyahu Armin Hakohen and Leah Blau
- Education: Mir Yeshiva, Poland
- Known for: Publishing about 40 volumes of never before seen Rishonim
- Occupation: Rabbi, lecturer, author

Religious life
- Religion: Judaism
- Movement: Chabad-Lubavitch

Rabbi Chaim Moshe Yehuda Hakohen Blau (1912–2003) was a German-born rabbi, lecturer and author. He published about 40 volumes of never before seen Rishonim.

== Early life ==
Rabbi Blau was born in Hamburg, Germany on 15 October 1912 (4th of Cheshvan 5673) to his parents Dr. Yirmiyahu Armin Hakohen and Leah Blau. At the age of 19 he went to study at the Mir Yeshiva, in Poland, under the tutelage of the Mashgiach, Rav Yeruchom Levovitz. He fell ill while in the Yeshiva and went to great lengths to receive the blessing of the Chofetz Chaim. With the outbreak of World War II, he fled together with the Yeshiva to Lithuania, received a visa from Chiune Sugihara enabling him and his wife to flee to Japan, and finally Shanghai, China, surviving the Holocaust. After the war was over he settled in the United States where he eventually became a chassid of the Lubavitcher Rebbe.

== Publishing Rishonim ==
In the United States he started corresponding with various library's, institutions, universities and museums to examine their holdings looking for unpublished ancient manuscripts of the Rishonim. He was successful in accessing the recesses of the Vatican Library. He ordered copies or microfilms of the manuscripts, which he would analyze and try to determine who authored it, as many of them were anonymous. To accomplish this, a near-surgical search of every possible commentary of relevance was required, in the hope of finding an attributed quote drawn from the anonymous work. Sometimes it involved catching a certain style, choice of words, or recurring phrase, that was found in an already existing commentary that attributed those words to a specific rabbi. He succeeded in identifying tens of Reshonim left untouched for hundreds of years. Once found he singlehandedly published these commentaries with his own notes. The first and one of the most famous books he published was the Commentary of the Ritva on Bava Batra. Many of his books were titled as "Hakadmonim" (Commentary of the early ones).

Rabbi Blau served as the spiritual leader of the Ahavas Achim synagogue in East New York, Brooklyn for 20 years, and then of congregation Avrohom U'tzvi Hirsch in Borough Park, Brooklyn for 30 years.

Rabbi Blau actively campaigned for the upkeep of the Mitzvos of Tefillin and Mezuzos. He would write and lecture about Kosher Tefillin and Mezuzos and that small Mezuzos were very often not Kosher. He arranged for roving Sofrim to travel to small cities in the United States and Canada to check Tefillin and Mezuzos free of charge and provided subsidized Tefillin and Mezuzos for those who did not have Kosher ones, or did not have them at all.
