= Gershon Yankelewitz =

Gershon Yankelewitz (November 23, 1909 – August 19, 2014) was a senior rosh yeshiva at the Rabbi Isaac Elchanan Theological Seminary of Yeshiva University. He served as an educator at that institution since the 1950s. He also gave a daily Torah lecture between Mincha and Maariv at the Young Israel of Pelham Parkway in Bronx Park East, New York.

== Life ==
Yankelewitz was born in Lubcha, present day Belarus. Prior to World War II Yankelewitz studied at the Mir Yeshiva (Belarus) and was considered a Talmid Muvhak (special student) of Rabbi Yerucham Levovitz, the Mashgiach of Mir. Yankelewitz also studied in Raduń Yeshiva, where he developed a close relationship with Rabbi Yisrael Meir Kagan (known as the Chofetz Chaim). He was one of the last remaining original Mirrer students, or "Alter Mirrers". Eventually he immigrated to the United States. There he was appointed by Rabbi Norman Lamm's predecessor, President Samuel Belkin, as a Rosh Yeshiva at the Rabbi Isaac Elchanan Theological Seminary of Yeshiva University. This was an unusual exception to the established norm, which stipulated that only college graduates were to be Roshei Yeshiva in YU.

A son of Yanklewitz married a daughter of Rabbi Gershon Wiesenfeld. In April 2010 Yankelewitz's wife, Bluma, died. A notice about her death and condolence wishes from the administration of YU was published in The New York Times.
