= Baruch Mordechai Ezrachi =

Israeli Haredi rabbi (1929–2023)

Rav Baruch Mordechai Ezrachi ברוך מרדכי אזרחי
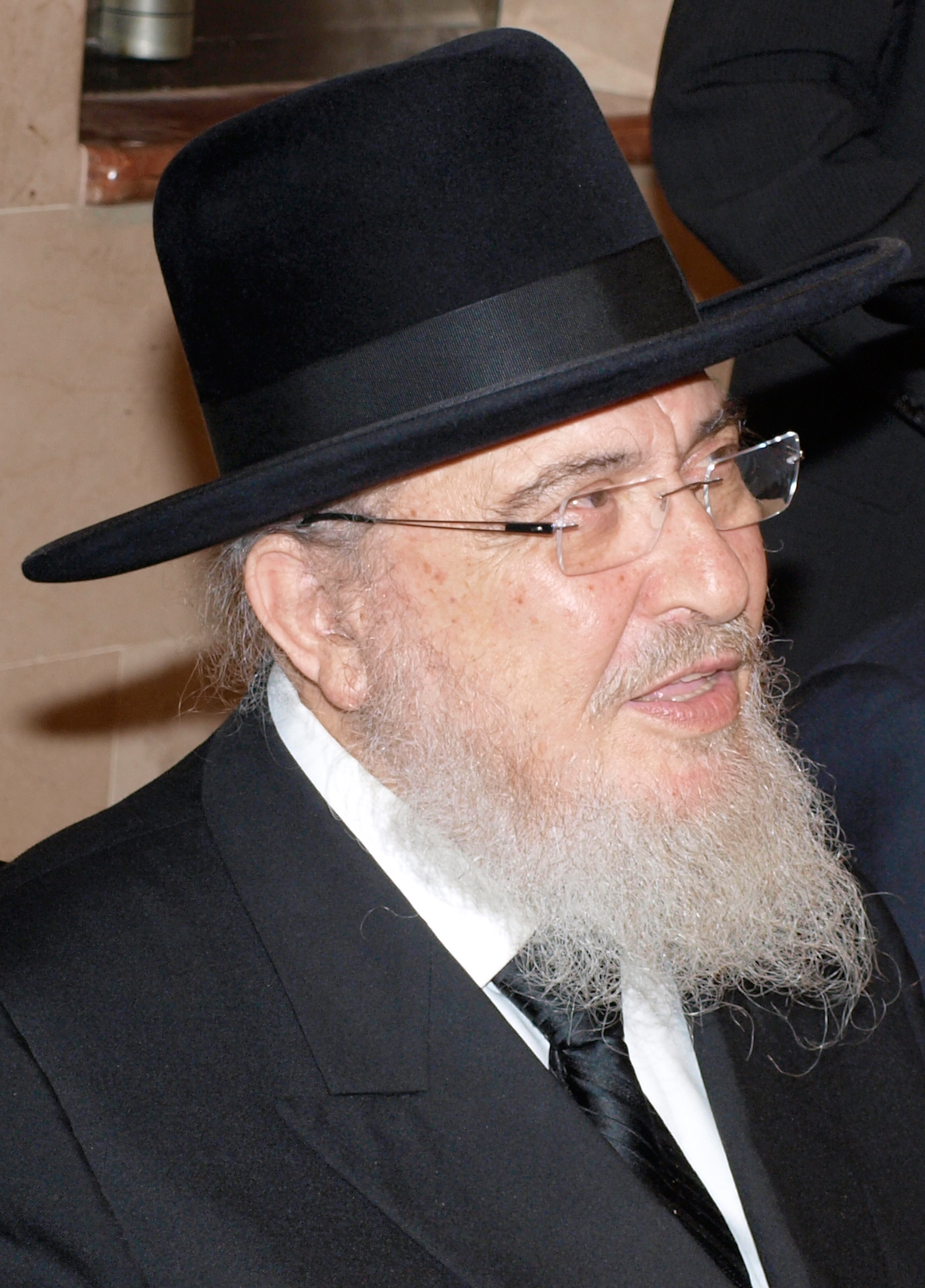
- Title: Rosh Yeshiva

Personal life
- Born: 27 March 1929 Petah Tikva, Mandatory Palestine
- Died: 26 October 2023 (aged 94) Jerusalem, Israel
- Spouse: Shulamit Ezrachi
- Education: Hebron Yeshiva

Religious life
- Religion: Judaism
- Yeshiva: Ateres Yisrael
- Position: Rosh Yeshiva
- Other: Member of the Moetzes Gedolei HaTorah

Baruch Mordechai Ezrachi (Hebrew: ברוך מרדכי אזרחי; 27 March 1929 – 26 October 2023) was an Israeli Haredi (ultra-orthodox) rabbi, and a leader of the non-Hasidic Lithuanian Jews. He was the Rosh Yeshiva (dean) of Ateres Yisrael in Bayit Vegan in Jerusalem, and a member of the Moetzes Gedolei HaTorah from the Degel HaTorah faction.

Rabbi Ezrachi was the son-in-law of Rabbi Meir Chodosh. In 1976, he started a yeshiva in Bayit Vegan called Ateres Yisroel which he moved to Modi'in in 2019.

He died on 26 October 2023, at the age of 94.

Ezrachi's brother is Rabbi Yitzchok Ezrachi, a Rosh Yeshiva at the Mir Yeshiva in Jerusalem.

== Political views ==
Ezrachi declared support for a halachic state, stating: "Yes, we want a halachic state! We want the honor of Heaven! We want sanctification of God's name! We do not want desecration of God's name!" (Note: The original Hebrew quote: "אמרת דבר גדול! לך אולי יש לך מה לפחד מאוד ממדינת הלכה! אולי טוב לכם שאתם בינתיים לא יודעים מה ההלכה אומרת עליכם. כן אנחנו רוצים מדינת הלכה! אנחנו רוצים כבוד שמים! אנחנו רוצים קידוש השם! כן. אנחנו לא רוצים, לא רוצים חילול השם!")

== Works ==
Ezrachi wrote many volumes of commentary on Torah, Talmud, halacha (Jewish law), Jewish festivals, and thought, called Birkas Mordechai (Hebrew: ברכת מרדכי Blessings of Mordechai).
