= Binyomin Beinush Finkel =

Israeli rabbi (1911–1990)

Rabbi Binyomin Beinush Finkel
- בנימין בינוש פינקל
- Born: 1911; Mir, Belarus
- Died: February 13, 1990 (aged 78–79); Jerusalem
- Known for: Rosh Yeshiva of The Mir
- Parent: Eliezer Yehuda Finkel

Rabbi Binyomin Beinush Finkel (Hebrew: בנימין בינוש פינקל; 1911 – February 13, 1990) was the rosh yeshiva of Yeshivas Mir in Jerusalem.

== Biography ==
He was born in Mir, Belarus, where his father Rabbi Eliezer Yehuda Finkel was the rosh yeshiva of the Mir yeshiva. Rabbi Finkel acquired most of his Torah knowledge during his studies at the yeshiva. In 1931, he studied under the Chofetz Chaim, and in 1933-34 under Rav Yitzchok Zev Soloveitchik, the Brisker Rov.

After his arrival in Palestine, he became close to the Chazon Ish. He married the daughter of Rav Shmuel Greineman, the Chazon Ish's brother-in-law. After his marriage, he began teaching in Yeshivas Beis Baruch, before becoming a rebbi in Yeshivas Mir, and in 1965, after his father's death, he began to head the yeshiva.

His son-in-law Rabbi Nosson Tzvi Finkel, (who is also his first cousin's son), is the previous rosh yeshiva of Yeshivas Mir in Jerusalem. Three other sons in-law act as associate Roshei Yeshiva, they are Rabbis Binyomin Carlebach, Nachman Levovitz, and Yisroel Glustein (who also has his own shiur in the Mir) . Another of his sons-in law, Rabbi Aaron Lopiansky, is rosh yeshiva of Yeshiva of Greater Washington in Silver Spring, Maryland.

Rabbi Finkel died on February 13, 1990.
