= Yitzchok Ezrachi =

Israeli rabbi

Rabbi Yitzchok Ezrachi יצחק אזרחי
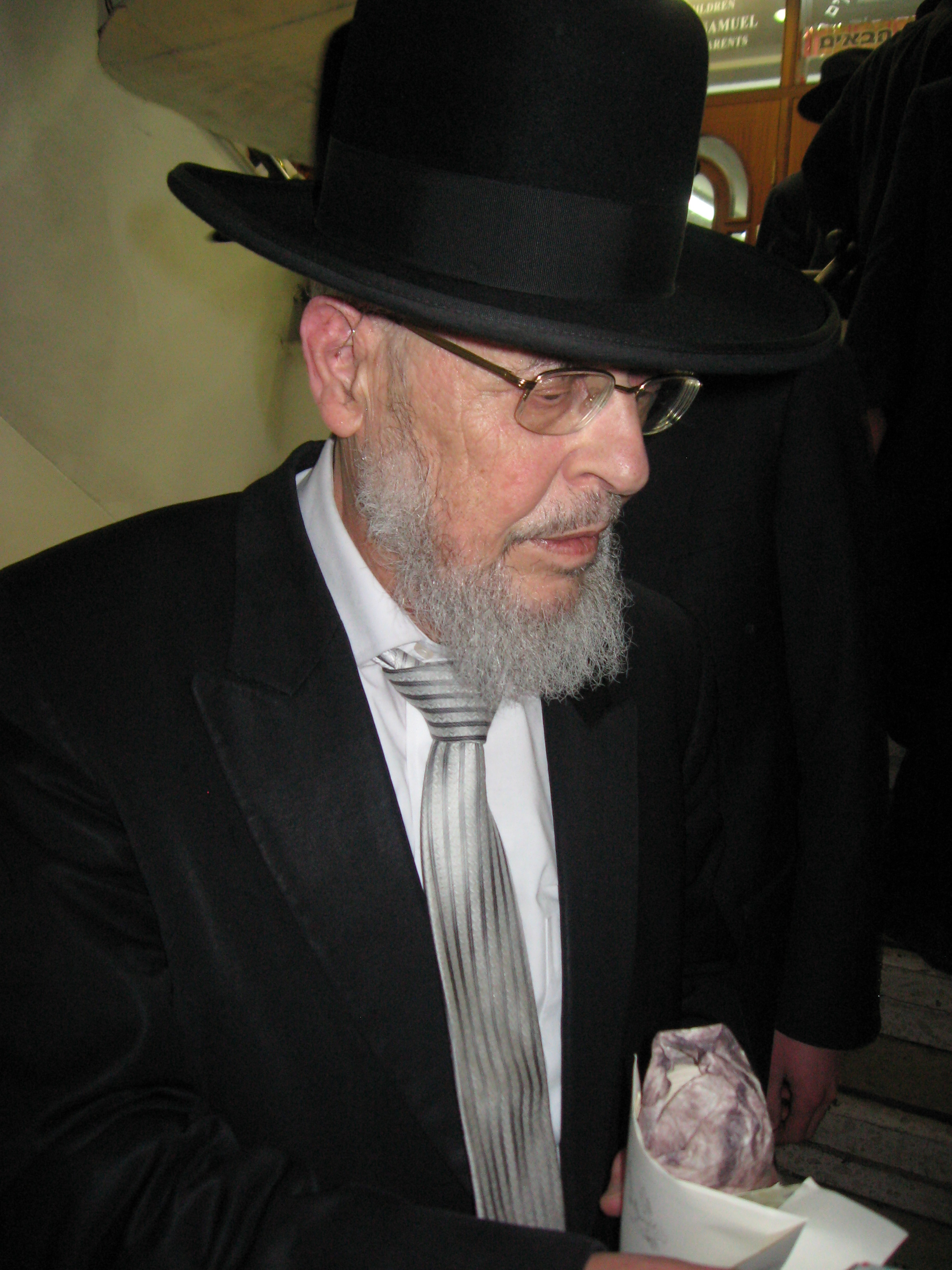
- Rabbi Ezrachi at Mir Yeshiva on Purim 2011.
- Title: Rosh Yeshiva in Mir

Personal life
- Born: Yitzchok Ezrachi
- Spouse: Rivka Ezrachi, daughter of Chaim Leib Shmuelevitz

Religious life
- Religion: Judaism
- Denomination: Haredi

Jewish leader
- Synagogue: Shul in Mattesdorf
- Yeshiva: Mir yeshiva (Jerusalem)
- Residence: Jerusalem, Israel

Yaakov Yitzchok Ezrachi (Hebrew: יצחק אזרחי; born August 1933) is a Rosh Yeshiva (dean) at the Mir Yeshiva in Jerusalem.

== Early life and education ==
Ezrachi was born in Jerusalem to Yisrael Ezrachi and Hinda. His mother was the daughter of Baruch Shlom, a graduate of the Knesses Yisrael Yeshiva in Slobodka who served as a rabbi in South Africa and was the grandson of Uri David Apiryon, rabbi of Žagarė in Lithuania and author of the book Apiryon David. He studied at the Mir Yeshiva.

== Career ==
Since 1979, he has served as one of the rosh yeshivas of the Mir Yeshiva, next to Eliezer Yehuda Finkel.

In 2024, Ezrachi travelled to Buenos Aires, Argentina, to speak about the Torah to an audience of seven thousand.

== Family ==
Ezrachi was married to Rivka, a daughter of Chaim Leib Shmuelevitz, also a former Rosh Yeshiva at the Mirrer Yeshiva. Rivka died in 2019.

Ezrachi's brother was Baruch Mordechai Ezrachi, another prominent Haredi rabbi.
