= Chaim Leib Tiktinsky =

Orthodox rabbi (1823–1899)

Rabbi Chaim Yehudah Leib Tiktinsky

Personal life
- Born: October 13, 1823 Mir, Russian Empire
- Died: March 30, 1899 (aged 75) Warsaw, Russian Empire
- Spouse: Toibe Tiktinsky

Religious life
- Religion: Judaism
- Denomination: Orthodox

Jewish leader
- Predecessor: Rabbi Yosef David Eisenstadt
- Successor: Rabbi Avraham Tiktinsky
- Yeshiva: Mir Yeshiva (Belarus)
- Position: Rosh yeshiva
- Began: 1844/1850
- Ended: 1894/1899

Chaim Yehudah Leib Tiktinsky (also spelled Tikutinsky) was an Eastern European Orthodox rabbi. He served as rosh yeshiva of the Mir Yeshiva in Russia, the third of the Tiktinsky family to serve the position.

== Early life ==
Tiktinsky was born on October 13, 1823, in the town of Mir in the Russian Empire. His father, Shmuel Tiktinsky, had founded the Mir Yeshiva in his town several years prior, in 1817, and after his death in 1835, his older son, Avraham Tiktinsky, became the rosh yeshiva, the post he held until his death four years later. Chaim Leib was just 17 seventeen years old at the time of his brother's death, and too young to replace him as rosh yeshiva. Therefore, Yosef David Eisenstadt, the town's rabbi, became the rosh yeshiva, (Note: According to Rabbi Paysach Krohn. However, according to Rabbi Berel Wein, Avraham Tiktinsky died the same year as Shmuel, and Eisenstadt was installed as rosh yeshiva immediately.) and after his death in 1846, his son Moshe Avraham Eisenstadt, succeeded him. Chaim Leib Tiktinsky was installed as a co-rosh yeshiva.

== Rabbinic career ==
Many felt that Tiktinsky, as the son of the yeshiva's founder, should lead as the sole rosh yeshiva. Twenty rabbis from Europe therefore gathered to listen to shiurim given by both Tiktinsky and Eisenstadt, and decide afterwards which one was more suited to serve as rosh yeshiva. Eisenstadt gave a complex shiur that left the rabbis impressed while Tiktinsky's was fairly simple, as he focused on the basic explanation of the Gemara and the commentaries of Rashi and Tosafot. After the presentations, it was decided that Tiktinsky's approach was better for the students, and he was appointed as rosh yeshiva. Rabbi Israel Salanter commented on this approach, saying that "anyone who wants to understand the daf (a folio of the Babylonian Talmud) properly should listen to Reb Chaim Leib teach it."

For fifty years, Tiktinsky led the yeshiva. Under his leadership, it became one of the largest yeshivas in Europe, second only to the Volozhin Yeshiva. During the years he served as rosh yeshiva, the yeshiva experienced several unprecedented challenges, as their building was engulfed twice by fires; many manuscripts of chiddushei Torah were destroyed as well in the blaze. Another challenge the yeshiva faced was from the Haskalah movement which tried attracting yeshiva students.

=== Death ===
Tiktinsky died on March 30, 1899, at the age of 75, in Warsaw. He was succeeded as rosh yeshiva by his son, Avraham Tiktinsky.
