= Simcha Zissel Halevi Levovitz =

HaRav Simcha Zissel Halevi Levovitz
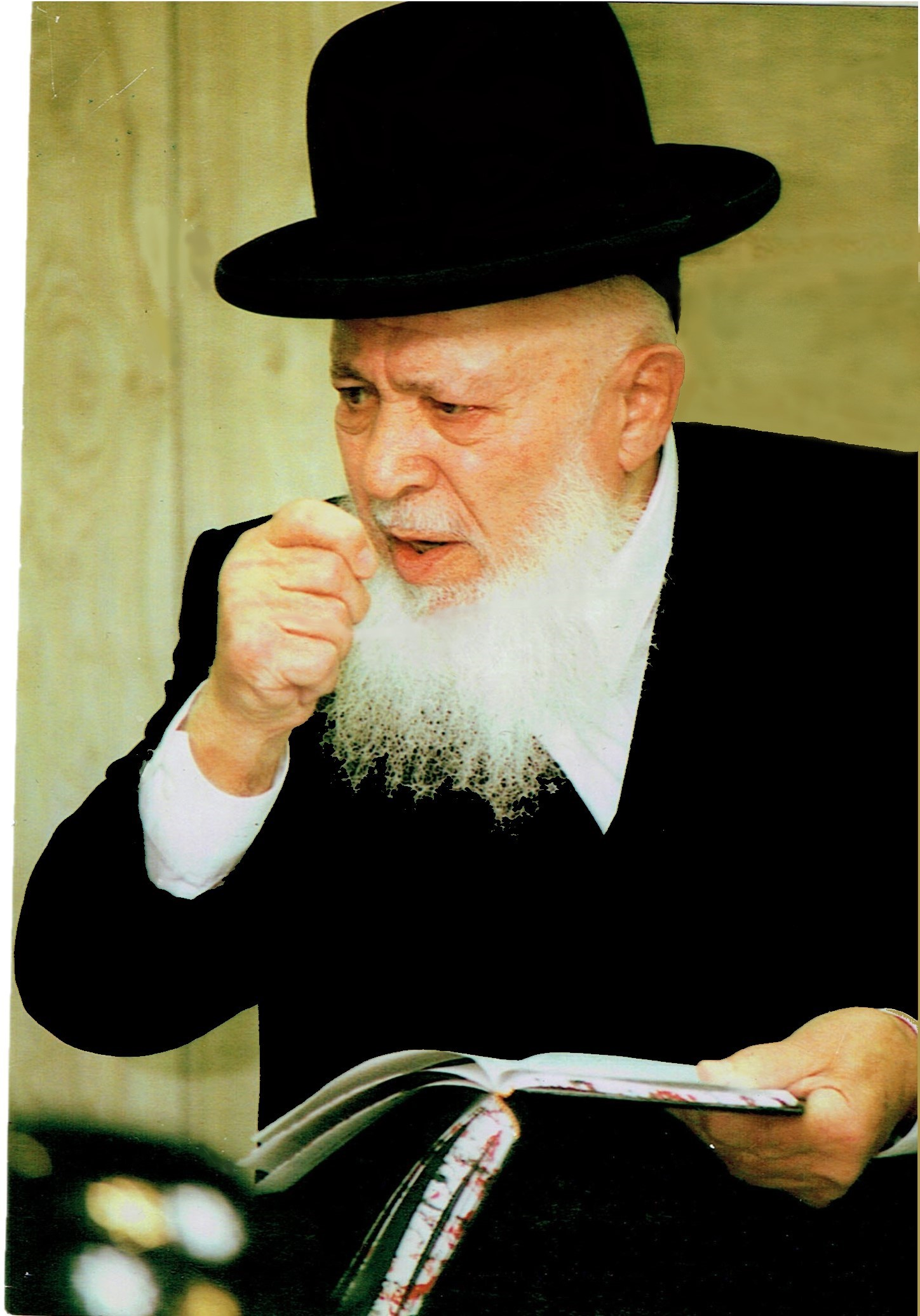
- HaRav Simcha Zissel Halevi Levovitz

Personal life
- Born: 1908 Ozovnet, Lithuania
- Died: 2001 (aged 92–93)
- Spouse: Daughter of Hartwig Naftali Carlebach
- Children: Three sons and one daughter
- Parent: Yeruchom Levovitz (father)
- Notable work(s): Published writings of Yeruchom Levovitz and Simcha Zissel Ziv
- Education: Grodno, Telz, Brisk
- Known for: Founder of the first Mesivta in Boro Park, Brooklyn
- Occupation: Rabbi, Educator

Religious life
- Religion: Judaism

HaRav Simcha Zissel Halevi Levovitz (1908–2001) was a Lithuanian-born American rabbi and founder of the first Mesivta (Jewish High School) in Boro Park, Brooklyn, and a teacher of thousands of students.

== Biography ==
He was born in 1908 in Ozovnet, Lithuania. His father, Musar movement leader Rabbi Yeruchom Levovitz, was the spiritual leader of Yeshivas Mir.

Levovitz studied in the yeshivas of Grodno, Telz and Brisk. At the start of World War II he fled to the United States and settled in Brooklyn, New York where he married the daughter of Hartwig Naftali Carlebach and sister of Shlomo Carlebach.

After his marriage he founded the first yeshiva high school in Boro Park. He also published the writings of his father, Yeruchom Levovitz, and of the rabbi after whom he was named, Simcha Zissel Ziv.

He and his wife had three sons, all rabbis, and one daughter.
