= Tiktinsky (Mir) =

Family that founded and led the original Mir yeshiva

The Tiktinsky (or Tiktinski) family is "associated with the foundation and development of" the Mir Yeshiva (Belarus), from which came the one in Jerusalem, the Mir in Brooklyn and Bais HaTalmud. Shmuel Tiktinsky and his oldest son, Avrohom, who both died (separately) in 1835, were the first two of this family to facilitate the success of the Mir. At that time, Shmuel's second oldest son, Chaim Leib, was eleven years old. Two others led the Mir before it became his turn.

== Shmuel Tiktinsky ==
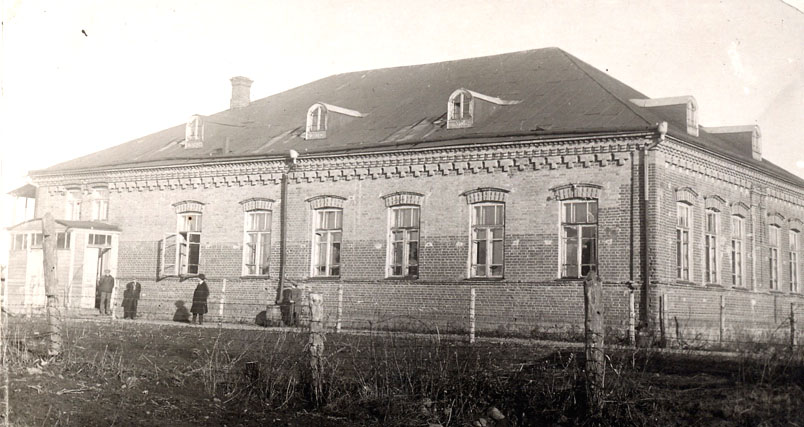
Mir Yeshiva, Europe

Shmuel Tiktinsky was "a merchant of considerable means and a talmudic scholar." He used both of these to build and run the Mir.

== Avrohom Tiktinsky ==
Avrohom Tiktinsky was given "the whole burden of administration" by his father in 1823. One change he made was eliminating eating kest - the practice of having individual students eat their meals by different town families each day. One purpose was "raising their status."

When, like his father, he died in 1835, Shmuel's second oldest son was eleven years old. Responsibility shifted to the chief rabbi of the town, and subsequently upon his death, to that rabbi's son.

== Chaim Yehuda Leib Tiktinsky (Chaim Leib) ==
In 1850, the now 26 year old Chaim Yehuda Leib Tiktinsky, known as Chaim Leib, "was appointed joint principal of the yeshiva." Chaim Leib "insisted that the student must devote himself solely to the texts and the commentaries" and reduced deployment of pilpul. This brought in more students, and in 1867, with the death of the other principal, he "was entrusted with the entire control" of the Mir. Chaim Leib named two sons Shmuel and Avrohom.

== Beyond ==
Chaim Leib's Shmuel (1876), and then Avrohom (1883), were his successors. The latter retired in 1907.
