= Nochum Partzovitz =

Jewish scholar

Rabbi Nochum Partzovitz

Personal life
- Born: Nochum Partzovitz; March 16, 1923 Trakai, Poland
- Died: November 26, 1986 (aged 63) Jerusalem, Israel

Religious life
- Religion: Judaism

Jewish leader
- Position: Rosh yeshiva
- Yeshiva: Mir Yeshiva (Jerusalem)
- Main work: Rosh yeshiva of Mir Yeshiva (Jerusalem)

Nochum Partzovitz (Hebrew: נחום פרצוביץ), also transliterated as Nachum Partzovitz, (March 16, 1923 – November 26, 1986) was a rabbi and rosh yeshiva (dean) of Yeshivas Mir, the largest Yeshiva in the world at the time. He is known for explanations of Talmudic topics.

== Biography ==
Partzovitz was born in Trakai, Poland to its Chief Rabbi, Aryeh Tzvi Partzovitz, who was a grandson of the posek (decider on points of Jewish law) of Vilna, Rabbi Shlomo HaKohen.

Partzovitz studied in the Baranovich Yeshiva under Elchonon Wasserman.

At the age of fifteen he attended the Yeshivas Mir, which his father had graduated from, under acting Rosh Yeshiva Chaim Leib Shmuelevitz. Soon after he began studying there, the Mir Yeshiva was exiled to Shanghai to escape the Holocaust which murdered much of European Jewry during World War II.

After briefly immigrating to Toronto, Ontario, Canada, following World War II, Partzovitz moved to Israel and joined the newly established Mir Yeshiva of Jerusalem. There he married Ettel, Shmuelevitz's daughter.

Following the death of Shmuelevitz in 1979, Partzovitz was promoted to Rosh Yeshiva of Mir. Due to physical illness, his active reign as Rosh Yeshiva was short-lived. As a Talmudic lecturer and later Rosh Yeshiva in Mir Yeshiva.

Partzovitz was survived by his two sons, both rabbis, once of whom is Tzvi Partzovitz (Rosh Yeshiva of Mir Brachfeld).

Partzovitz's daily and general lectures are being printed posthumously by his children and students as Chiddushei Reb Nochum and Shiurei Reb Nochum. A Haggadah featuring words of Torah from the various Rosh Yeshivas of Mir also includes his commentaries and lectures.

== Notable students ==
- Eliyahu Boruch Finkel
- Avigdor Nebenzahl
- Asher Arieli - son-in-law
- Aaron Lopiansky (Rosh Hayeshiva at Yeshiva of Greater Washington)
- Chaim Kamil
- Hanoch Teller
- Eli Baruch Shulman (Rosh Hayeshiva at Rabbi Isaac Elchanan Theological Seminary)
- Shabtai Rappaport Head of the Beit Midrash ("Kollel") of the Torah Institute for Bar-Ilan University
