= Mir Yeshiva (Jerusalem) =

Coordinates: 31°47′18.5″N 35°13′26″E

- ישיבת מיר
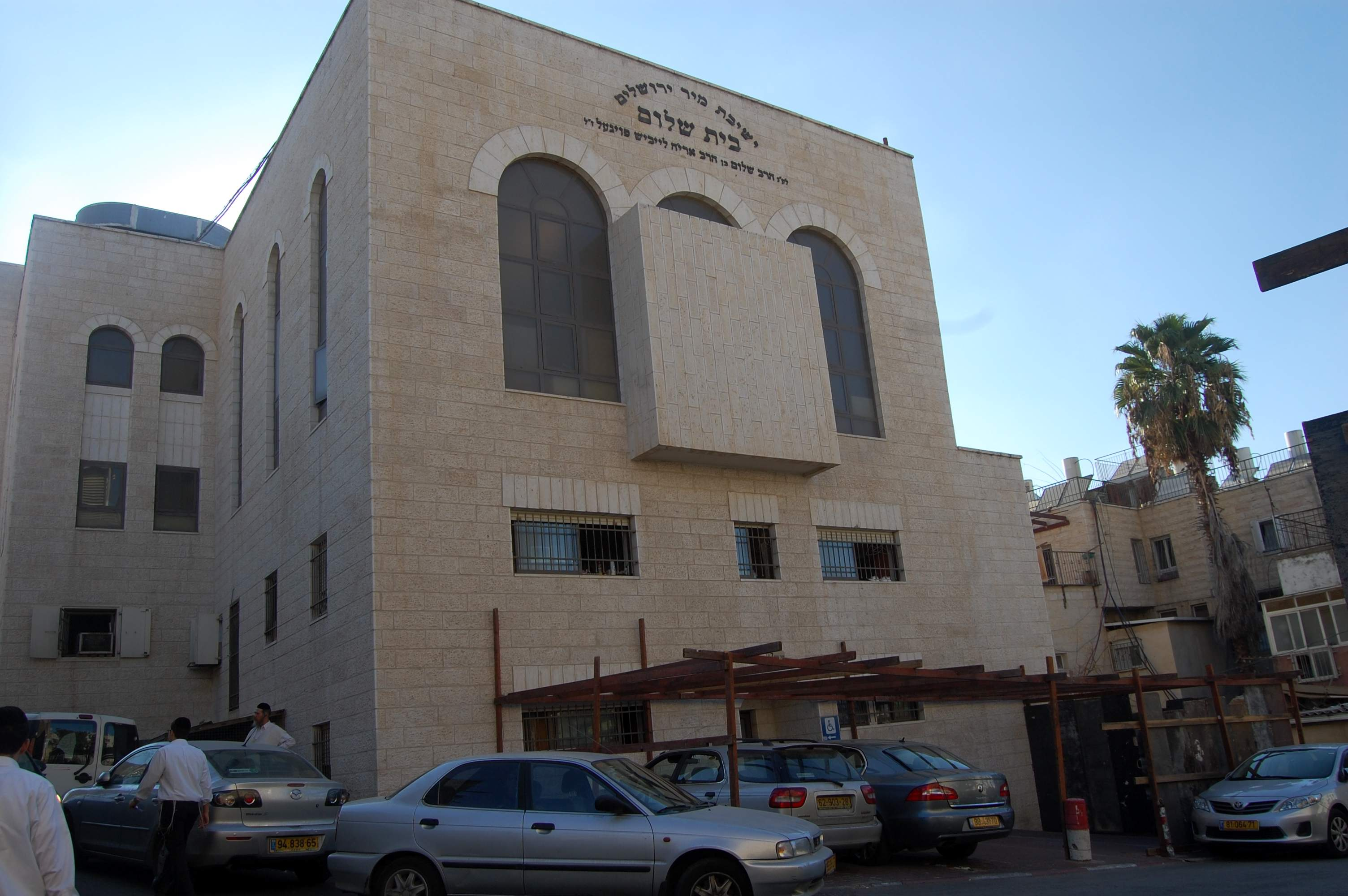
- Mir Yeshiva in Jerusalem in September 2012
- Beit Yisrael, Jerusalem

Information
- Religious affiliation: Orthodox
- Established: 1944
- Founder: Eliezer Yehuda Finkel (Reb Leizer Yudel)
- Dean: Eliezer Yehuda Finkel
- Enrollment: 9,600

The Mir Yeshiva (Hebrew: ישיבת מיר, Yeshivat Mir), known also as The Mir, is an Orthodox Jewish yeshiva in Beit Yisrael, Jerusalem. With over 9,000 single and married students, it is the largest yeshiva in the world. Most students are from Israel and the United States, with many from other parts of the world such as Belgium, France, the United Kingdom, Mexico, Switzerland, Argentina, Australia, Russia, Canada and Panama.

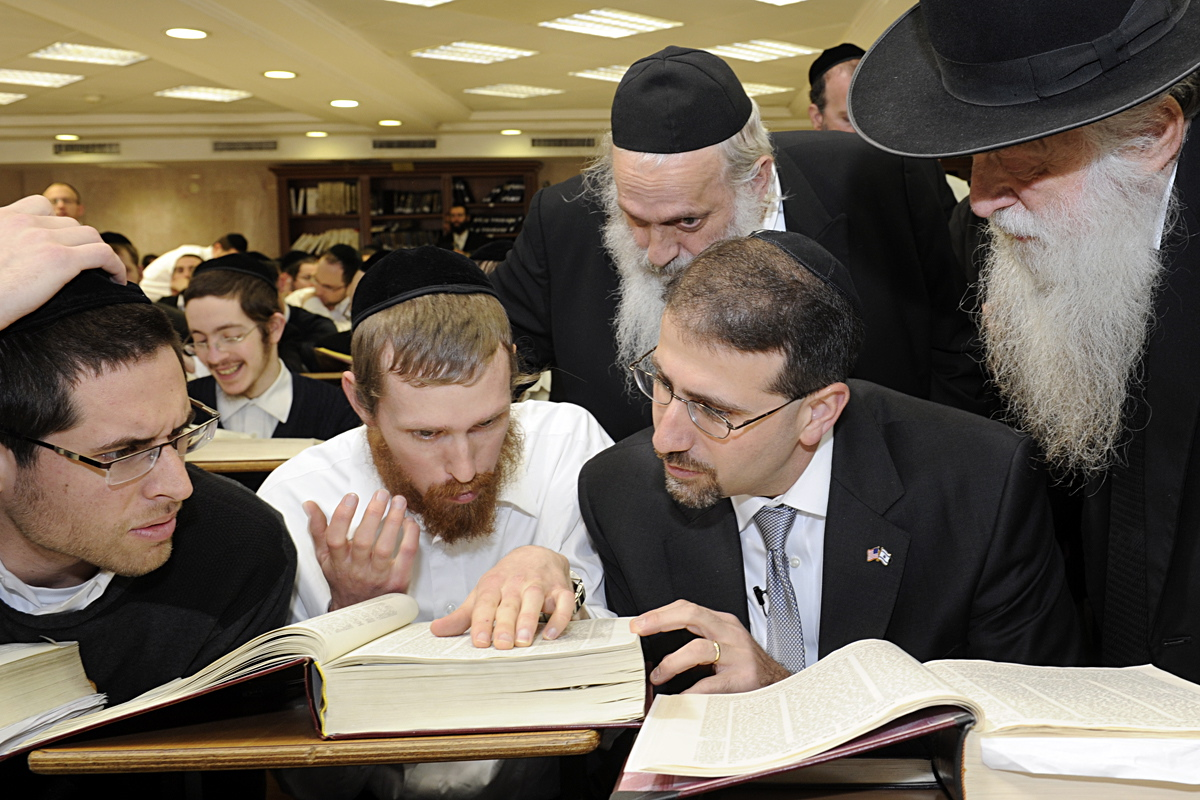
Students study in the beis medrash

== History ==
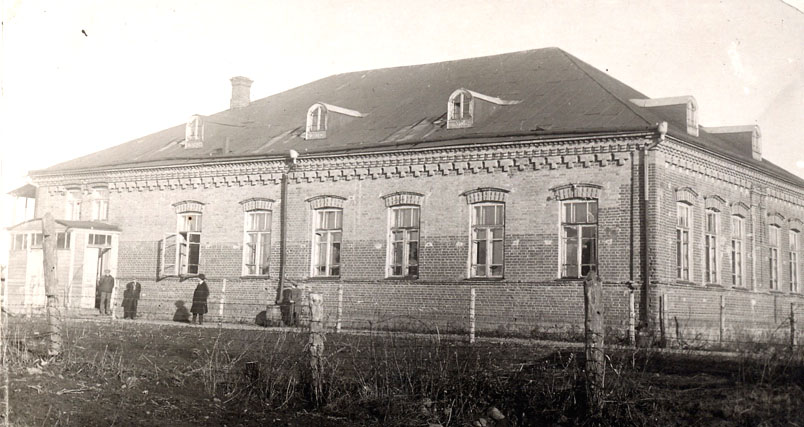
The original building of Yeshivat Mir in Belarus

The yeshiva was founded in the small town of Mir (now in Belarus) in 1814, 1815 or 1817 by Rabbi Shmuel Tiktinsky. After his death, his oldest son, Rabbi Avraham Tiktinsky, was appointed Rosh Yeshiva. After a number of years, Avraham died and his younger brother, Rabbi Chaim Leib Tiktinsky, succeeded him. Rabbi Chaim Leib would remain as Rosh Yeshiva for many decades. He was succeeded by his son, Rabbi Avrohom Tiktinsky, who brought Rabbi Eliyahu Boruch Kamai into the yeshiva. In 1903, Rabbi Kamai's daughter married Rabbi Eliezer Yehuda Finkel, son of Rabbi Nosson Tzvi Finkel of Slabodka, who in time became the Rosh Yeshiva of the Mir. The yeshiva remained in that location until 1914.

With the outbreak of World War I, the yeshiva moved to Poltava (now in Ukraine). In 1921, the yeshiva moved back to its original facilities in Mir, where it remained until, Nazi Germany and the Soviet Union invaded Poland in 1939.

Although many of the foreign-born students left when the Soviet army invaded from the east, the yeshiva continued to operate—albeit on a reduced scale—until the approaching German armies caused the leaders of the yeshiva to move the entire community to Keidan, Lithuania. The yeshiva moved en masse on October 15 to Vilna in order to get out from under Russian rule and into then-free Lithuania. Russia had announced that it was returning Vilna to Lithuania. Until that was completed, they could go to Vilna by crossing a border.

== Establishment in Jerusalem ==
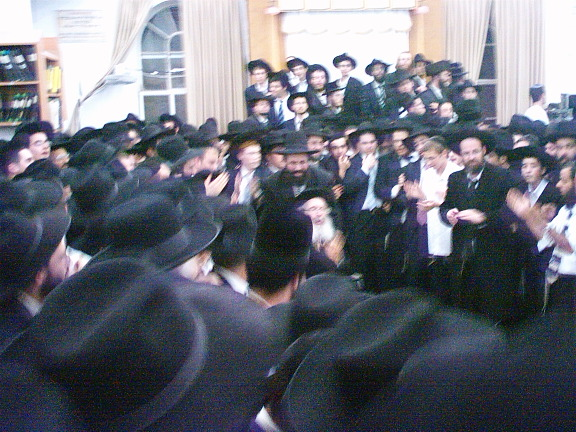
Mir Yeshiva's Simchat Beit HaShoeivah celebration (2006)

Around this time, Rabbi Eliezer Yehuda Finkel traveled to Mandatory Palestine to obtain visas for his students and re-establish the Mir Yeshiva in Eretz Yisrael, but these plans were interrupted by the outbreak of World War II in Europe. In 1944, Rabbi Finkel opened a branch of the yeshiva in Jerusalem with ten students, among them Rabbi Yudel Shapiro (later Rosh Kollel Chazon Ish), Rabbi Chaim Brim (later Rosh Yeshiva of Rizhn-Boyan), and Rabbi Chaim Greineman.

During World War II, as the Wehrmacht continued to push to the Eastern Front, the yeshiva students fled to Japanese-controlled Shanghai under the Wang Jingwei regime, where they remained until the end of the war. The story of the escape to the Far East of Mir Yeshiva along with thousands of other Jewish refugees from Nazi-occupied Europe, thanks largely to visas issued by the Dutch consul, Jan Zwartendijk, and the Japanese consul-general to Lithuania, Chiune Sugihara, has been the subject of several books and movies, including the PBS documentary film Conspiracy of Kindness. After the war, most of the Jewish refugees from the Shanghai Ghetto left for Mandatory Palestine and the United States. Among them were survivors from the Mir Yeshiva, many of whom rejoined the yeshiva in Jerusalem. Rabbi Finkel's son, Rabbi Chaim Zev Finkel (commonly called Chazap), served as mashgiach.

When Rabbi Eliezer Yehuda Finkel died on July 19, 1965, his son, Rabbi Beinish Finkel and his brother-in-law, Rabbi Chaim Leib Shmuelevitz became joint Mirrer Rosh Yeshivas. Reb Chaim was considered the main Rosh Yeshiva and when he died, his son-in-law, Rabbi Nachum Partzovitz, replaced him. Rabbi Beinish Finkel became Rosh Yeshiva after Reb Nachum died. With Rabbi Beinish Finkel's death in 1990, the reins were taken over by Rabbi Beinish Finkel's sons-in-law, with the Rosh Yeshiva, Rabbi Nosson Tzvi Finkel, at the helm. After Nosson Tzvi Finkel's death on November 8, 2011, his eldest son, Rabbi Eliezer Yehuda Finkel, was named as his successor.

== Chaburas ==
Under Rabbi Nosson Tzvi Finkel, the yeshiva's enrollment grew into the thousands. The large enrollment was divided into chaburas, or learning groups. Each chabura consists of the same type of student – e.g. American, European, Israeli, Hasidic, and non-Hasidic. These chaburas sit in designated areas in the Mir's various study halls (the three biggest being Merkazi, Beis Yeshaya, Beis Shalom), as well as in the same area in the dining room. Each chabura is subdivided by shiur (class), with each maggid shiur (lecturer) teaching a group of students. The largest shiur in the yeshiva (which is also the biggest in the yeshiva world) is that of Rabbi Asher Arieli, who gives shiurim in Yiddish to over 1000 students.

== Mir Brachfeld ==
The yeshiva has a branch in Modi'in Illit primarily for Israelis, which also includes a kollel. Mir Brachfeld was headed by Rabbi Aryeh Finkel (grandson of Rabbi Eliezer Yehuda Finkel and son of Rabbi Chaim Zev Finkel) until his passing on Aug. 9, 2016. His oldest son, Rabbi Binyomin Finkel, took over as Rosh Yeshiva.

== Leadership ==
- Eliezer Yehuda Finkel, Rosh Yeshiva, since 2011
- Yitzchok Ezrachi, Rosh Yeshiva

== Past leadership ==
- Rabbi Eliezer Yehuda Finkel, Rosh Yeshiva, 1917–1965;
- Rabbi Chaim Leib Shmuelevitz, Rosh Yeshiva, 1941–1979
- Rabbi Nochum Partzovitz, Rosh Yeshiva, 1979–1986
- Rabbi Binyomin Beinush Finkel, Rosh Yeshiva, 1979 - 1990
- Rabbi Nosson Tzvi Finkel
- Rabbi Refoel Shmuelevitz Rosh Yeshiva, 1990–2016

== Notable alumni ==
- Rabbi Yitzchak Berkovits, Rosh Yeshiva, Aish HaTorah, Rosh Kollel, Linus HaTzedek: Center for Jewish Values
- Ari Goldwag, singer-songwriter
- Rabbi Aryeh Kaplan, philosopher, author, and translator
- Zvi Kogan (1996–2024), Israeli-Moldovan rabbi killed in the United Arab Emirates
- Shulem Lemmer (born 1990), singer
- Baruch Levine, singer-songwriter
- David Lichtenstein, real estate investor
- Yisroel Mantel, American rabbi
- Shlomo Yehuda Rechnitz, philanthropist
- Rabbi Jacob J. Schacter, rabbi and historian
- Natan Slifkin, rabbi and zoologist
- Rabbi Tovia Singer, American rabbi
- Moses Michael Levi Barrow (born Jamal Michael Barrow; 1978), previously known by his stage name Shyne, Belizean rapper and politician

== See also ==
- Mir Yeshiva (Belarus)
