= Silas Aaron Hardoon =

Chinese Jewish businessman (1851–1931)

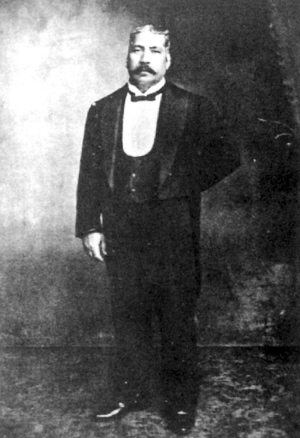
- Born: c. 1851; Baghdad, Ottoman Iraq
- Died: June, 1931 (aged 79–80); Shanghai, China
- Occupations: Businessman, Member of the Shanghai Municipal Council, Member of the Conseil municipale, French Concession

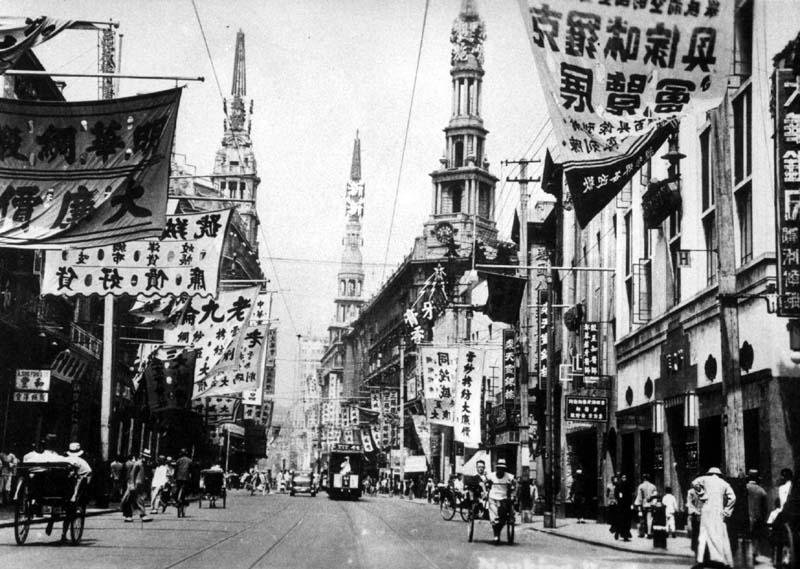
Nanking Road in the 1930s

Silas Aaron Hardoon (Chinese: 哈同; pinyin: Hātóng; c. 1851– June, 1931) was a wealthy businessman and well-known public figure in the city of Shanghai in the early 20th century.

== Biography ==
Silas was born Saleh Hardoon (סאלח חרדון) into a poor Jewish family in Baghdad. His family left Baghdad for Mumbai, India where he was educated at a charitable school funded by David Sassoon.

In 1868 Silas Aaron Hardoon traveled to the city of Shanghai (China), where he was employed by David Sassoon & Company as a rent collector and watchman. He quickly rose through the ranks of the company, displaying a talent for real estate. After leaving David Sassoon & Company in 1882 he tried to set up his own cotton trading company. After three years he gave up his business and joined E.D. Sassoon & Co. as their branch manager in Shanghai. The China land boom convinced Hardoon to leave the company in 1920. Shrewd investments, particularly in properties on Shanghai's "Fifth Avenue," Nanking Road, eventually made him one of that city's wealthiest inhabitants. In fact, Silas Hardoon was the man who funded the building and construction of the original Nanking Road. This is the section that comprises the still standing art-deco style buildings that can be seen today. In early 1920 the future Chinese leader Mao Zedong stayed in Shanghai at a property owned by Hardoon on present-day Anyi Road.

Hardoon lived with his Eurasian wife Luo Jialing (née Liza Roos 1864–1941), a devout Buddhist, in the Aili Park, a 26-acre estate (now the Shanghai Exhibition Centre), and personally financed the printing of Buddhist writings. At one point he was the richest person in Asia and one of the richest in the world. When he died in 1931, his personal fortune was estimated at $650 million, equivalent to around $15 billion in current dollars.

After Hardoon's death, Liza and the couple's adopted children fought amongst themselves, and with Hardoon's Iraqi family members, for Hardoon's estate in a series of lawsuits spanning 16 years. The Hardoon Inheritance Case is referred to as the most famous inheritance case in Shanghai's history. The case between Liza's family and Hardoon's Iraqi relatives was fought before the British Supreme Court for China in Shanghai, with a side action in Baghdad, and ended with a finding in favour of Liza in 1937. The dispute between the Hardoons' adopted children erupted after Liza's death in 1941, and ended with a settlement reached between the children in 1946.

However, Ezra Salch Hardoon, who represented the other Iraqi relatives, continued to petition the Chinese courts both before and after the Communist take-over in 1949. In 1956, the Shanghai Intermediate People's Court ruled that, because Liza had accumulated large outstanding debts, the entirety of Hardoon's estate would be secured by the court. In June 1957, the court terminated the Hardoon inheritance case and Ezra Salch Hardoon finally departed Shanghai for Iraq.
