= Yechezkel Levenstein =

Polish rabbi and mashgiach ruchani

Rabbi Yechezkel Levenstein
- יחזקאל לוינשטיין
- Born: 1885; Warsaw
- Died: 1974 (aged 88–89); Bene Berak
- Education: Raduń Yeshiva, Kelm Talmud Torah

Rabbi Yechezkel Levenstein (Hebrew: יחזקאל לוינשטיין) known as Reb Chatzkel, (1885 – 18 Adar (11 or 12 March) 1974), was the mashgiach ruchani of the Mir Yeshiva, in Mir, Belarus and during the yeshiva's escape to Lithuania and on to Shanghai due to the invasion of Poland by Nazi Germany in World War II. He was a leader of several yeshivas in Europe, the United States, and Israel.

== Biography ==
Levenstein was born in Warsaw (5656) His mother, Zlota, died when he was five years old; his father, Yehuda, subsequently remarried. He studied for 2 1/2 years in the yeshiva in Łomża, influenced by the mussar movement, then in Raduń Yeshiva under the Chofetz Chaim and Rabbi Yeruchom Levovitz, and finally in the Kelm Talmud Torah.

His wife was named Chaya.

From 5695 (1935), for about 2 years he was the mashgiach of Yeshivas Lomza in Petach Tikvah.

== Shanghai ==
News reached Shanghai Adar 5703 (1943), where the Mir spent the war years, of the murders of so many of Lithuanian Jewry. The eulogy of the martyrs by the mashgiach was published in a book, Mimizrach Shemesh.

== Yeshivos ==
The Yeshivos that he founded or strongly influenced include:

- Before World War II

- Mir Yeshiva (Poland), as Mashgiach Ruchani

- After the War

- Mir Yeshivah (Yerushalayim)
- Ponovezh Yeshivah (B'nei Brak)

== Works ==
- Or Yechezkel, a seven volume work of musar

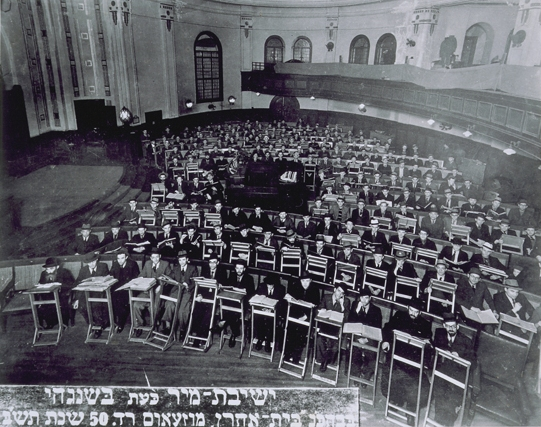
The Mir yeshiva in the Beth Aharon Synagogue, Shanghai; Levenstein is in the front row at far left

== Bibliography ==
- Kasnett, Yitzchak (2007) Reb Chatzkel. Rabbi Yechezkel Levenstein - Guardian of Torah and Mussar, Artscroll Mesorah Publications, ISBN 9781422605387
