= Beth Aharon Synagogue =

Former synagogues in Shanghai, China

- Chinese: 阿哈龍會堂
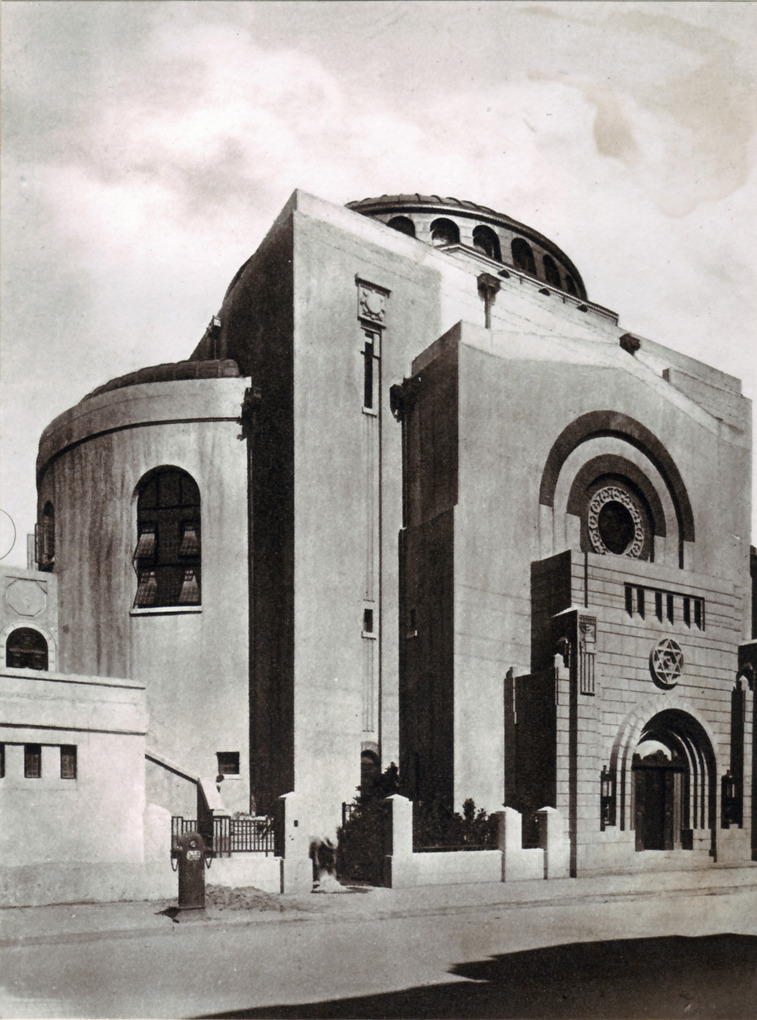
- The former synagogue, in the 1930s

- Location of the demolished synagogue, in Shanghai

Religion
- Affiliation: Judaism (former)
- Rite: Nusach Sefard
- Ecclesiastical or organizational status: Synagogue (1927–1941); Profane use (1941–1985)
- Status: Destroyed

Location
- Location: 42 Huqiu Road, Huangpu District, Shanghai
- Country: China
- Interactive map of Beth Aharon Synagogue
- Coordinates: 31°14′29.4″N 121°29′14.7″E

Architecture
- Architect: Palmer and Turner
- Funded by: Silas Aaron Hardoon
- General contractor: Silas Aaron Hardoon
- Completed: 1927
- Demolished: 1985
- Capacity: 400 worshippers

Beth Aharon Synagogue
- Traditional Chinese: 阿哈龍會堂
- Simplified Chinese: 阿哈龙会堂
Transcriptions
Standard Mandarin
- Hanyu Pinyin: Āhālóng Huìtáng
- Wade–Giles: A-ha-lung Hui-t'ang

The Beth Aharon Synagogue (Chinese: 阿哈龍會堂; Hebrew for "House of Aharon") was a Sephardi synagogue in Shanghai, China, built in 1927 by the prominent businessman Silas Aaron Hardoon in memory of his father Aaron. During World War II, the synagogue provided refuge for the Mirrer yeshiva of Poland, the only Eastern European yeshiva to survive the Holocaust intact. After the establishment of the People's Republic of China, it was used by the Wenhui Bao newspaper and as a factory during the Cultural Revolution. It was demolished in 1985.

== History ==
=== Construction ===
The Beth Aharon Synagogue was built in 1927 by the Jewish businessman Silas Aaron Hardoon, one of the wealthiest people in Shanghai, as a gift to the city's Jewish community. It was named after Hardoon's father, Aaron. It was located at 20 Museum Road (now 42 Huqiu Road) in the Shanghai International Settlement, near the Bund and Hongkew, in present-day Huangpu District. It replaced the Shearith Israel Synagogue, which was built in 1900, and had a capacity for 400 people. The synagogue was designed by the architectural firm Palmer and Turner, which also designed the iconic HSBC Building on the Bund.

=== World War II ===
In 1941, thousands of Polish Jews fleeing from Nazi persecution arrived in Kobe, Japan via Siberia. Japan, then preparing for war with the United States, was eager to expel the refugees. The refugees sought permission from the Shanghai Municipal Police to enter the city, which was granted with the understanding that they would emigrate to the United States after six months. They moved to Shanghai between August and October.

Among the refugees were all 400 rabbis and students of the Mirrer yeshiva, the only Eastern European yeshiva to survive the Holocaust intact, as well as members of the other yeshivas of Lublin, Telshe (Lithuania), Kletsk and Lubavitch (Byelorussia). They were housed at the Beth Aharon Synagogue, with some at the Russian Shanghai Jewish Club. Although some managed to move to the United States and Canada, most of the refugees were stranded when the Pacific War broke out in December 1941, and the Japanese moved to occupy the Shanghai International Settlement. Throughout the war they continued their studies in Judaism at Beth Aharon, and printed books in Yiddish and Hebrew. Some students taught at Jewish schools in Shanghai. The presence of the Mirrer yeshiva made Shanghai temporarily one of the world's most active centers of Jewish studies.

=== Repurpose and demolition ===
After the Chinese Communist Party won the Chinese Civil War and established the People's Republic of China in 1949, the Beth Aharon Synagogue became part of the compound of the government newspaper Wenhui Bao. During the Cultural Revolution, the synagogue was structurally changed and turned into a factory. It was demolished In 1985, replaced by the high-rise Wenhui Bao office building.

== See also ==
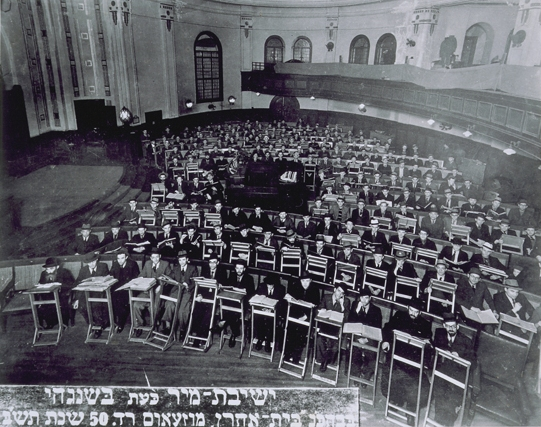
Students and teachers of the Mirrer yeshiva studying in the sanctuary of the Beth Aharon Synagogue

- History of the Jews in China
- List of synagogue in China
