= Eliezer Yehuda Finkel (born 1879) =

Belarusian-Israeli Orthodox rabbi, rosh yeshiva of Mir

Rabbi Eliezer Yehuda Finkel אליעזר יהודה פינקל
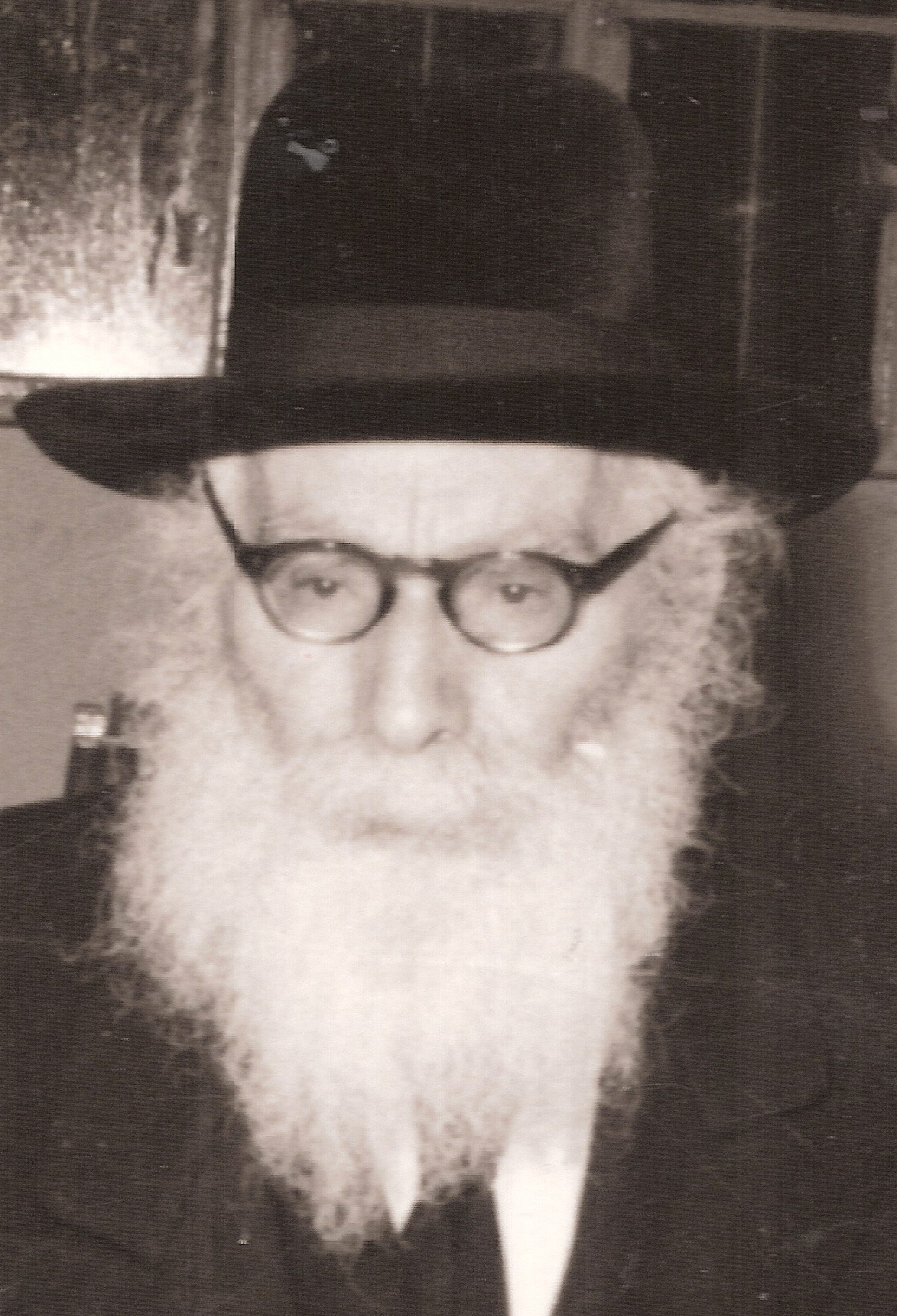
- Title: Rosh Yeshivas Mir

Personal life
- Born: Eliezer Yehuda Finkel; 1879 Lugoj
- Died: 1965 (aged 85–86) Jerusalem
- Buried: Har HaMenuchot
- Spouse: Malka Kamai
- Children: Moshe; Chaim Zev; Beinish
- Parent: Rabbi Nosson Tzvi Finkel

Religious life
- Religion: Judaism
- Denomination: Haredi

Jewish leader
- Predecessor: Rabbi Eliyahu Boruch Kamai
- Successor: Rabbi Chaim Shmuelevitz
- Yeshiva: Mir yeshiva (Belarus)
- Position: Rosh yeshiva
- Began: 1917
- Ended: 1965

Eliezer Yehuda Finkel, also known as Reb Leizer Yudel Finkel, (1879–1965) was the Rosh Yeshiva (dean) of the Mir Yeshiva in both its Polish and Jerusalemic incarnations.

== Early life ==
Finkel was the son of the Mussar movement leader, Nosson Tzvi Finkel. He studied under Chaim Soloveichik in Brisk. He also studied in Raduń Yeshiva.

In 1903 Finkel married Malka, the daughter of Rabbi Eliyahu Boruch Kamai who was the Rosh Yeshiva of the yeshiva in Mir, Belarus. Three years later he joined the staff of the Mir Yeshiva, and in 1917 became its Rosh Yeshiva upon the death of his father-in-law.

During the interwar period, the Mir Yeshiva's enrollment grew close to 500 students from all over the world. During this time Finkel chose one of his students, Rabbi Chaim Leib Shmuelevitz as a son-in-law and eventually successor.

== World War II and after ==
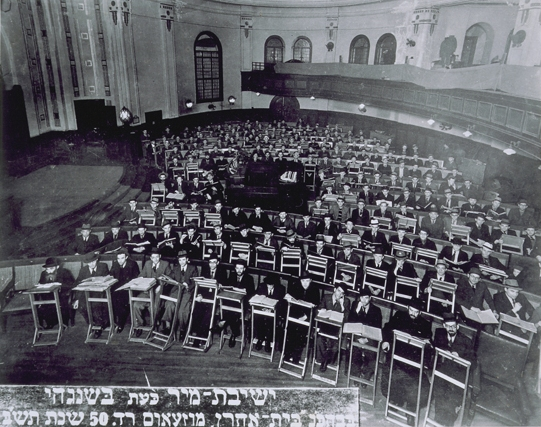
The Mir yeshiva in the Beth Aharon Synagogue, Shanghai

With the outbreak of World War II, the yeshiva was forced into exile and eventually it found refuge in Kobe, Japan and Shanghai, China. While the student body, led by Rabbi Chaim Shmuelevitz eventually relocated to the United States (see Mir Yeshiva (Brooklyn)), Finkel established a new branch of the Mir Yeshiva in Jerusalem with a handful of advanced Talmudic students from Etz Chaim Yeshiva.

Later Shmuelevitz came to Jerusalem to be Rosh Yeshiva under his father-in-law. One of Finkel's sons, Rabbi Beinish Finkel succeeded his brother-in-law Shmuelevitz as Rosh Yeshiva upon the latter's death in the 1979.

He founded other yeshivas, including the original yeshiva of Yitzchok Zev Soloveitchik, to whom he sent some of his top students.
