= Yeruchom Levovitz =

Belarusian Rosh Yeshiva and mussar leader

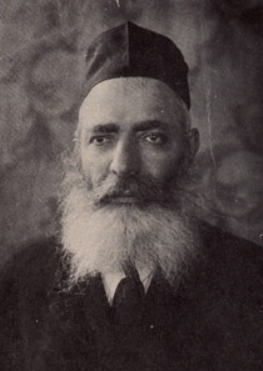

Personal life
- Born: c. 1875 Lyuban, Russian Empire
- Died: 1936 Mir, Russian Empire
- Buried: Mir, Belarus
- Children: Simcha Zissel Halevi Levovitz
- Parents: Avraham Levovitz (father); Chasya Levovitz (mother)
- Notable work(s): Daas Torah, Daas Chochma U'Mussar, Shvivai Daas, Sifsai Daas on Pirkei Avos
- Education: Slobodka, Kelm
- Known for: Spiritual leadership at Mir Yeshiva
- Occupation: Mashgiach ruchani (dean of students), Baal Mussar

Religious life
- Religion: Judaism

Jewish leader
- Yahrtzeit: 18 Sivan (June 7/8)

Yeruchom Levovitz (Hebrew: ירוחם ליוואוויץ; c. 1875 – 1936), was a mashgiach ruchani (dean of students) and baal (master of) mussar (Jewish Ethics) at the Mir Yeshiva in Belarus.

== Early life ==
R' Yeruchom Levovitz was born in 1875 (5635 in the Jewish calendar) in Lyuban, in Minsk Region, Belarus (near Slutsk) to Avraham and Chasya Levovitz. He received his education in the yeshivas of Slobodka and Kelm.

He was a disciple of rabbis Nosson Tzvi Finkel, and Simcha Zissel Ziv of Kelm.

== Mir Yeshiva ==
Levoviz was the spiritual leader of the Mir Yeshiva in Belarus from 1910 until the outbreak of World War I and then again from 1924 until his death in 1936.

After World War II, much of orthodox Jewry in Europe was wiped out, along with their many yeshivas (Jewish schools of higher learning). One of the only yeshivas to survive as a whole body was the Mir Yeshiva, which escapex to Shanghai, China, and then on to America.

== Disciples ==
Some of his better known disciples include Simcha Zissel Halevi Levovitz, Chaim Shmulevitz, Dovid Povarsky, Aryeh Leib Malin, Abba Berman, Zelik Epstein, Shimon Schwab, Shlomo Wolbe, Binyomin Zeilberger, Nachum Partzovitz.

He died on the 18th of Sivan (June 7/8) in 1936 at the age of sixty-three. He is buried in the town of Mir, Belarus.

== Works ==
His shmuessen (discoursed on ethics and improving character) were published posthumously by his students - mainly by his son Rav Simcha Zissel, in Daas Chochma U’mussar, and Daas Torah. After Rav Simcha Zissel's passing, his son Rav Yisroel continued his father's work and published Sifsei Da'as and Da'as Zekanim on Avos, Shivivei Da'as on Mo'adim, and just this year Da'as Binah on the Haggadah.
