= Mir Yeshiva (Belarus) =

School of Jewish studies

- ישיבת מיר
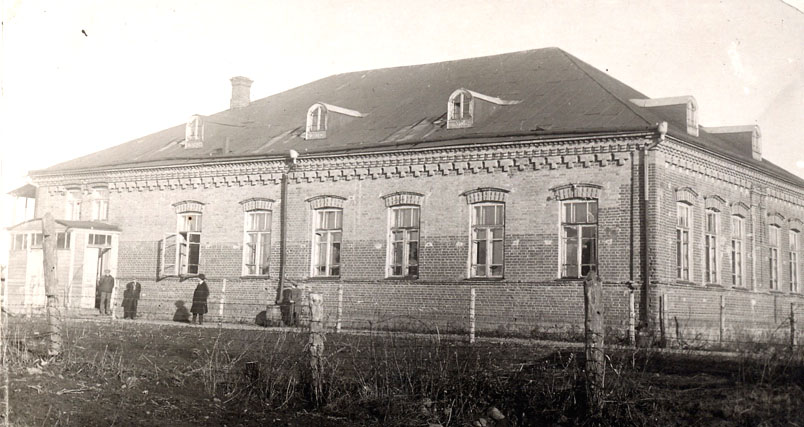

Location
- Mir; Belarus
- Coordinates: 53.4550°N 26.4632°E

Information
- Religious affiliation: Orthodox Judaism
- Established: 1815 or 1817
- Founder: Rabbi Shmuel Tikutinsky
- President: Rabbi Avraham Kalmanowitz
- Faculty: Rabbi Eliezer Yehuda Finkel; Rabbi Yeruchom Levovitz
- Enrollment: 250-400 (1920s)
- Language: Hebrew

The Mir Yeshiva (Hebrew: ישיבת מיר, Yeshivat Mir), commonly known as the Mirrer Yeshiva (Yiddish: מירער ישיבה) or The Mir, was a Lithuanian yeshiva located in the town of Mir, Russian Empire (now Belarus). After relocating a number of times during World War II, it has evolved into three yeshivas: one in Jerusalem and two in Brooklyn, New York: the Mir Yeshiva, and Bais Hatalmud.

== Origins ==
The Mirrer Yeshiva was founded in 1815, 12 years after the founding of the Volozhin Yeshiva, by one of the prominent residents of a small town called Mir (then in Grodno Governorate, Russian Empire), Rabbi Shmuel Tiktinsky. After Shmuel's death, his youngest son, Rabbi Chaim Leib Tiktinsky, was appointed rosh yeshiva (head of the yeshiva). He was succeeded by his son, Rav Avrohom, who brought Rabbi Eliyahu Boruch Kamai into the yeshiva. During Rabbi Kamai's leadership the direction of the yeshiva wavered between those who wished to introduce the study of musar and those who were against it.

In 1903, Rabbi Kamai's daughter Malka married Rabbi Eliezer Yehuda Finkel, son of Rabbi Nosson Tzvi Finkel, the 'Elder of Slabodka', who joined the yeshiva faculty in late 1906. Under his influence, the yeshiva joined the musar movement definitively and Rabbi Zalman Dolinsky of Radun was appointed as its first mashgiach (spiritual supervisor).

== World War I ==
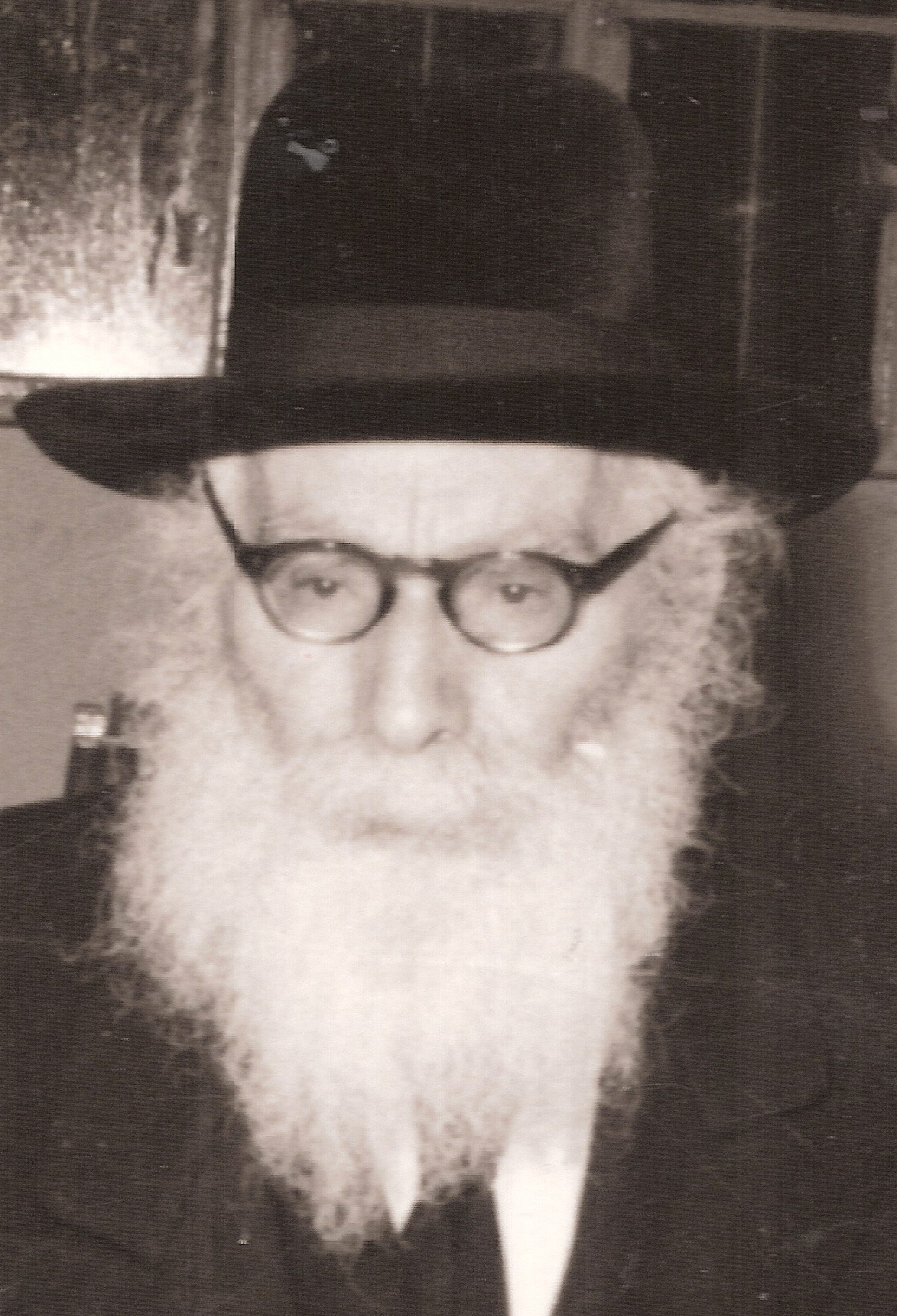
Rabbi Eliezer Yehuda Finkel

With the outbreak of World War I in 1914, the yeshiva moved from Mir to Poltava (now in Ukraine). Following the death of Rabbi Kamai in 1917, Rav Eliezer Yehuda was appointed as rosh yeshiva, marking the commencement of the golden age of the yeshiva. In 1921, The yeshiva moved back to its original facilities in Mir, where it blossomed, attracting the cream of the yeshiva students. The yeshiva's reputation grew, attracting students not only from throughout Europe, but also from America, South Africa and Australia, and the student body grew to close to 500. By the time World War II broke out there was hardly a rosh yeshiva of the Lithuanian school who had not studied in Mir. In 1924, Rabbi Yeruchom Levovitz rejoined the yeshiva as mashgiach after having originally been mashgiach from 1910 until the beginning World War I.

In 1929, one of the yeshiva's most gifted students, Chaim Leib Shmuelevitz ("Chaim Stutchiner"), married the daughter of Rabbi Eliezer Yehuda Finkel. Rabbi Chaim was appointed to the faculty in 1935.

== Escape to the East ==
The invasion of Poland in 1939 by Nazi Germany from the west and the Red Army from the east meant the yeshiva was unable to remain in Mir, which was now under Soviet control. While many foreign-born students left, the majority of the yeshiva relocated to Lithuania, which had been occupied by the Soviet Union but not yet fully absorbed. The yeshiva was first re-established in Wilno (Vilnius), and then in Keidan (Kėdainiai). Not many months elapsed before Lithuania came under the Soviet Union's complete control, jeopardizing the yeshiva's future. The yeshiva was divided into four sections: The "first division", under the leadership of Rabbi Chaim Leib Shmuelevitz as rosh yeshiva and Rabbi Yechezkel Levenstein as mashgiach, relocated to Krakinova; the other three divisions went to the three small towns of Ramigola, Shat and Krak. It was obvious, however, that this arrangement was only a temporary solution, and that ultimately the yeshivah would need to flee Soviet-occupied Lithuania in order to survive.

One of the yeshiva students approached the British Consul in Kaunas, Thomas Preston who issued the students with temporary British travel documents to be used instead of passports. He left the documents undated so that they would not expire and issued them without confirming their identities. He also issued visas for a limited number of the students to enter Palestine. In the summer of 1940, several students of the yeshivah led by Nathan Gutwirth, a Dutch citizen, learned that the ambassador of the Netherlands in Riga, Leendert de Decker, together with the Dutch honorary consul in Kaunas Jan Zwartendijk were willing to provide them with destination-visas to the Dutch Caribbean colony Curaçao. Concurrently, it became known that the Japanese consul in Lithuania, Chiune Sugihara, had agreed to issue transit visas to refugees who wished to escape via the Japanese-occupied Pacific. As a result, most of the yeshivah students requested and received several thousand transit-visas from Sugihara, permitting them to depart to the Far East.

In the fall of 1940, the yeshiva students traveled via the Trans-Siberian Railway to Vladivostok, Russia; and then by ship to Tsuruga, Japan. The yeshiva reopened in Kobe, Japan in March 1941.

== Kobe ==
While the Yeshiva was in Kobe, a debate arose among the yeshiva students regarding when to observe the Sabbath. The opinions of the Chazon Ish and Rav Yechiel Michel Tokachinsky were solicited. Ultimately, the students refrained from biblical Sabbath violations on two days, but kept it completely on only one of the days.

Several smaller yeshivas managed to escape alongside the Mirrer Yeshiva and, despite the difficulties involved, the leaders of the yeshiva undertook full responsibility for their support, distributing funds (mostly received from the American Jewish Joint Distribution Committee) and securing quarters and food for all the students.

== Shanghai ==
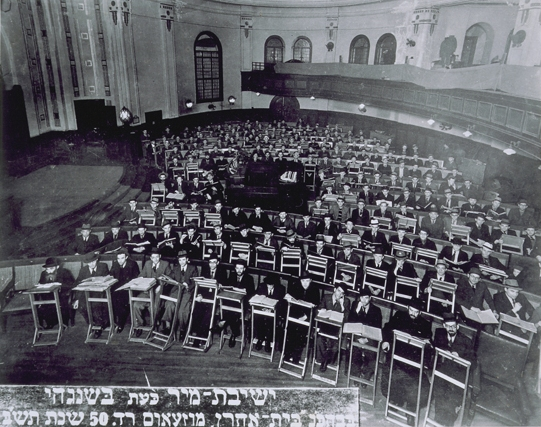
Students and teachers of the exiled Mir yeshiva study in the sanctuary of the Beth Aharon Synagogue, Shanghai

A short time later, the yeshiva relocated again, to (Japanese-controlled) Shanghai, China, where they remained until 1947. In Shanghai, Rabbi Meir Ashkenazi, a Lubavitcher chasid who served as the spiritual leader of the Jewish refugees, arranged for the yeshiva to occupy the Beth Aharon Synagogue, built in 1920 by a prominent Jewish Shanghai businessman, Silas Aaron Hardoon. For the first few weeks, until funds could be sourced for provisions, the yeshiva community suffered from malnutrition.

== Re-establishment after the war ==
Following the end of the war, the majority of the Jewish refugees from the Shanghai ghetto left for Israel and the United States. Two deans of the Mir Yeshiva, Rabbi Eliezer Yehuda Finkel and Rabbi Avraham Kalmanowitz, managed to escape from Europe before the war in 1939 and did not accompany the yeshiva to Shanghai.

Rabbi Finkel could not accompany the yeshiva due to health issues, and he therefore traveled by ship through Odessa and Turkey to Mandatory Palestine where he established the Mirrer Yeshiva in Jerusalem, with a subsidiary campus, Mir Brachfeld. His son, Rabbi Chaim Zev Finkel, served as mashgiach.

Rabbi Kalmanowitz went to the United States where he worked to help the Jews in Europe and Shanghai. He is credited for sending both funds and hundreds of gemaras. In America, he established the Mirrer Yeshiva Central Institute in Rockaway and later moved it to Brooklyn, New York City. The yeshiva's leaders, Rabbi Shmuelevitz and Rabbi Levenstein, left Shanghai for New York in early 1947 with the last contingent of students. Three months later Rabbi Shmuelevitz set sail for Eretz Yisrael, where he joined the faculty of the Mirrer Yeshiva that had been established by Rabbi Finkel. Rabbi Levenstein too left soon after his arrival for Israel where he was appointed mashgiach of the Ponevezh Yeshiva.

After their arrival in New York from Shanghai, some of the yeshiva's older and most respected students established the Beth Hatalmud Rabbinical College in Brooklyn, New York, to serve as a continuation of the original yeshiva that went to Shanghai.

== Prominent alumni ==
- Rabbi Yehezkel Abramsky
- Rabbi Aryeh Leib Baron
- Rabbi Abba Berman
- Rabbi Samuel Belkin
- Rabbi Shmuel Berenbaum
- Rabbi Moshe Yehuda Blau
- Rabbi Zelik Epstein
- Dayan Michoel Fisher
- Rabbi Ze'ev Wolf Gold
- Lazar Gulkowitsch
- Rabbi Leib Gurwicz
- Rabbi Nachum Kaplan
- Rabbi Yisrael Mendel Kaplan
- Rabbi Yitzchok Isaac Krasilschikov
- Rabbi Dovid Kviat
- Rabbi Simcha Zissel Halevi Levovitz
- Rabbi Dovid Lifshitz
- Rabbi Aryeh Leib Malin
- Rabbi Zvi Hirsch Masliansky
- Rabbi Isser Zalman Meltzer
- Rabbi Herman N. Neuberger
- Rabbi Eliezer Palchinsky
- Rabbi Nochum Partzovitz
- Rabbi Dovid Povarsky
- Rabbi Chaim Pinchas Scheinberg
- Rabbi Kopul Rosen
- Rabbi Simcha Sheps
- Rabbi Shimon Schwab
- Rabbi Moshe Zvi Segal
- Rabbi Moshe Shmuel Shapira
- Rabbi Naftoli Shapiro
- Rabbi Shimon Shkop
- Rabbi Chaim Shmuelevitz
- Rabbi Pesach Stein
- Rabbi Nosson Meir Wachtfogel
- Rabbi Yechiel Yaakov Weinberg
- Rabbi Gershon Yankelewitz
- Rabbi Binyamin Zeilberger
- Rabbi Shlomo Yosef Zevin

== Prominent faculty ==
=== Roshei Yeshivah (heads of the yeshiva) ===
- Rabbi Shmuel Tiktinsky (1815- )
- Rabbi Chaim Leib Tiktinsky
- Rabbi Eliyahu Boruch Kamai (? -1917)
- Rabbi Eliezer Yehuda Finkel (1917–1965); (son of Nosson Tzvi Finkel and son-in-law of Eliyahu Boruch Kamai)
- Rabbi Chaim Leib Shmuelevitz (1941–1979)
- Rabbi Avraham Kalmanowitz

=== Mashgichim (spiritual supervisors) ===
- Rabbi Zalman Dolinsky
- Rabbi Yeruchom Levovitz
- Rabbi Yechezkel Levenstein

== See also ==
- History of the Jews in Poland
- History of the Jews in Belarus
