= Mashgiach ruchani =

Jewish spiritual supervisor or guide

A mashgiach ruchani (Hebrew: משגיח רוחני; pl., mashgichim ruchani'im), sometimes mashgiach for short, is a spiritual supervisor or guide. They are usually a rabbi who has an official position within a yeshiva and is responsible for the non-academic areas of yeshiva students' lives.

== Description ==
The position of mashgiach ruchani arose with the establishment of the modern "Lithuanian-style" musar yeshivas. The prototype of this new type of rabbinical leader and educator was Rabbi Nosson Tzvi Finkel (1849-1927) known as the Alter (elder) of the Slabodka yeshiva, Yeshivas Knesses Yisrael (Slabodka), in Lithuania.

The role of the mashgiach ruchani was strongest in the era before World War II, when often the mashgichim were responsible for maintaining the yeshiva financially, recruiting and interviewing new students, and hiring staff, something akin to academic deans. After the Holocaust, the influence and position of the mashgiach decreased, and the roles of the rosh yeshivas have grown at the expense of those of the mashgichim. A modern mashgiach/mashgicha is somewhat equivalent to the secular counselor position. The need for having mashgichim within the modern yeshivas was tied in with the rise of the modern musar movement (teaching of Jewish ethics), inspired by the 19th-century rabbi Israel Salanter..

Some yeshivas may refer to a mashgiach/mashgicha ruchani as a menahel ruchani (the word menahel means 'principal', as in the principal of a school, or 'supervisor'.)

Chabad yeshivas have a similar position referred to as mashpia, meaning a person who provides (spiritual) influence.

== Famous mashgichim ==
- Nosson Tzvi Finkel (1849-1927) mashgiach ruchani of Yeshivas Knesses Yisrael (Slabodka), Lithuania
- Yehuda Leib Chasman, mashgiach ruchani of the Hebron Yeshiva, Israel
- Eliyahu Eliezer Dessler (1892-1953), mashgiach ruchani of the Ponevezh yeshiva in Bnei Brak, Israel
- Binyamin Finkel, mashgiach ruchani of Yeshivas Mishkan Yisrael, Jerusalem
- Yechezkel Levenstein (1895-1974), mashgiach ruchani of Mir yeshiva, Poland
- Yeruchom Levovitz (1873-1936), mashgiach ruchani of the Mir yeshiva, Poland
- Moshe Rosenstein (1880-1941), mashgiach ruchani of Lomza Yeshiva, Poland
- Don Segal
- Beryl Weisbord, mashgiach ruchani of Yeshivas Ner Yisroel, Baltimore
- Elyah Lopian (1876-1970) mashgiach ruchani of Knesses Chizkiyahu, Israel
- Matisyahu Salomon (1937 - 2024) mashgiach ruchani of Gateshead Yeshiva and later, Beth Medrash Govoha (the Lakewood Yeshiva)
- Nosson Meir Wachtfogel (1910-1998), mashgiach ruchani of Beth Medrash Govoha (the Lakewood Yeshiva), USA, from 1941 to 1998
- Shlomo Wolbe (1914-2005)
- Dov Yaffe (1928-2017), mashgiach ruchani of Knesses Chizkiyahu, Israel
- Avigdor Miller (1908-2001) mashgiach ruchani of Yeshiva Rabbi Chaim Berlin, USA, from 1944 to 1964
- Shlomo Carlebach (scholar), (1925-2022) mashgiach ruchani of Yeshiva Rabbi Chaim Berlin, USA, from 1966 to 1978
- Daniel Rhein mashgiach ruchani of Yeshivat Har Etzion, Israel, from 2001

== See also ==
- Rosh Yeshiva
- Mussar movement
- Mashpia
