= Mount of Olives Jewish Cemetery =

Cemetery in Jerusalem, Israel

Coordinates: 31°46′25.82″N 35°14′35.05″E

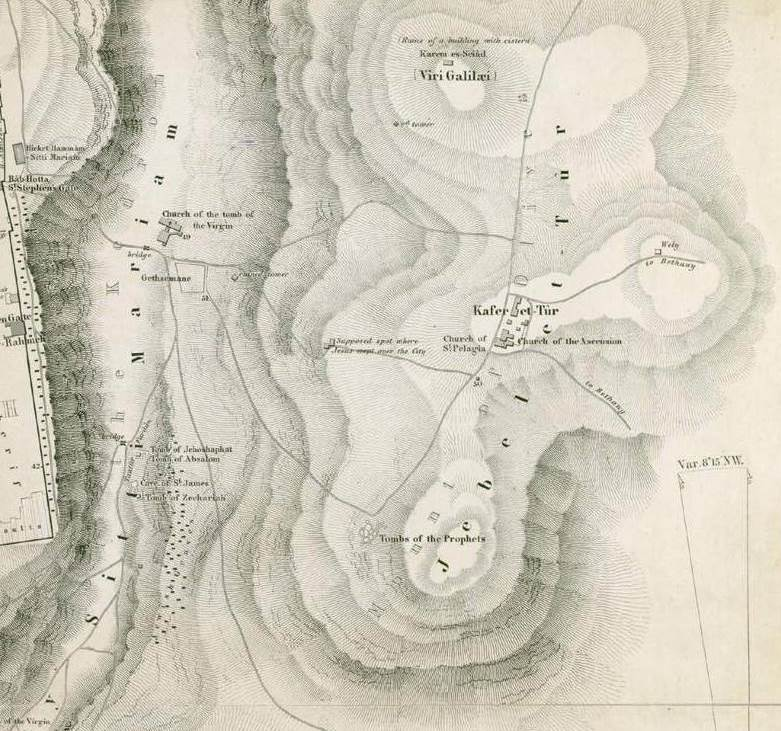
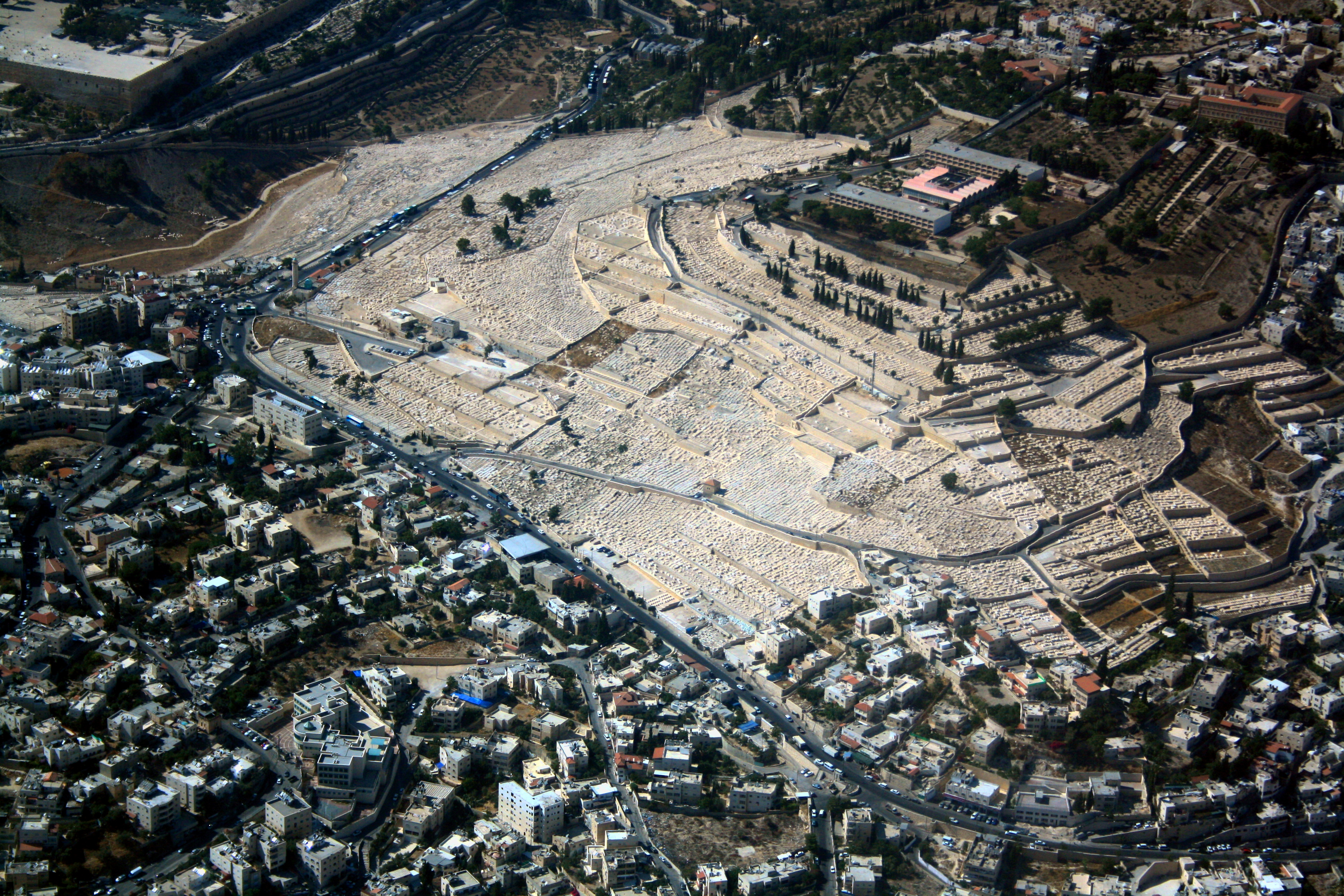
The Jewish Cemetery on the Mount of Olives, 155 years apart. The map, from 1858, considered the most accurate in existence at the time, showing graves marked on the bottom left. The aerial photo, from 2013, is taken from the south; the number of tombs is now around 70,000–150,000.

The Jewish Cemetery on the Mount of Olives (Hebrew: בֵּית הַקְּבָרוֹת הַיְּהוּדִי בְּהַר הַזֵּיתִים, romanized: Bejt ha-Qvarōt ha-Jəhūdī bə-Har ha-Zejtīm) is the oldest and most important Jewish cemetery in Jerusalem. The Mount of Olives had been a traditional Hebrew/Jewish burial location in antiquity. The present-day main cemetery is approximately five centuries old, having been first leased from the Islamic Jerusalem Waqf in the sixteenth century. The cemetery contains anywhere between 70,000 and 150,000 tombs, including the tombs of famous figures in early modern Jewish history. It is considered to be the largest and holiest historical (as opposed to modern) Jewish cemetery on Earth.

It is adjacent to the much older archaeological site known as the Silwan necropolis.

== History ==
=== pre-1948 ===
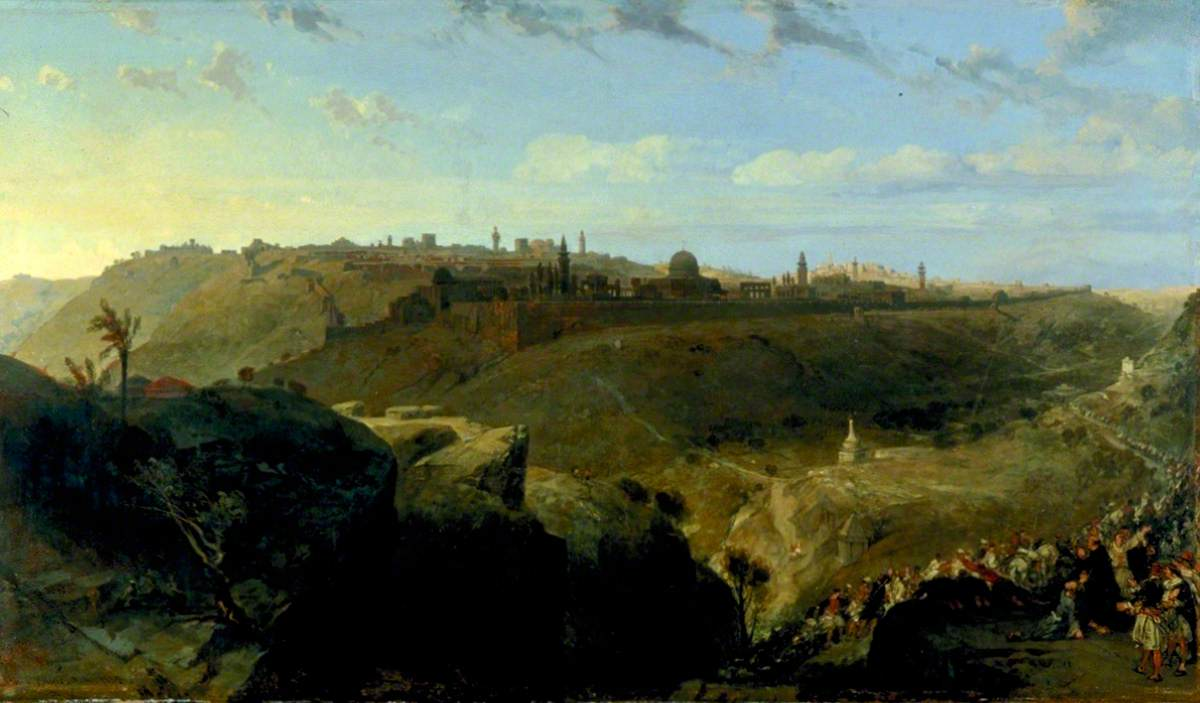
David Roberts (1796-1864) - Jerusalem from the Mount of Olives with the Tomb of Absalom and Al-Aqsa in the distance

In the 19th century, special significance was attached to Jewish cemeteries in Jerusalem. The desire to be buried on the Mount of Olives stemmed in part from the Segulaic advantages attributed to the burial, according to various sources.

During the First and Second Temple periods, the Jews of Jerusalem were buried in burial caves scattered on the slopes of the Mount, and from the 16th century the cemetery began to take its present shape.

The old Jewish cemetery sprawled over the slopes of the Mount of Olives overlooking the Kidron Valley (Valley of Jehoshaphat), radiating out from the lower, ancient part, which preserved Jewish graves from the Second Temple period; here there had been a tradition of burial uninterrupted for thousands of years. The cemetery was quite close to the Old City, its chief merit being that it lay just across the Kidron Valley from the Temple Mount: according to a midrash, it is here that the Resurrection of the Dead would begin. The Messiah will appear on the Mount of Olives, and head toward the Temple Mount. As the sages say: "In the days to come, the righteous will appear and rise in Jerusalem, as it is said, "And they will sprout out of the city like the grass of the field" – and there is no city but Jerusalem".

=== Jordanian rule ===
Tombstones from the desecrated Jewish cemetery on the Mount of Olives

During Jordanian rule, the Jewish cemetery suffered damage to 38,000 gravestones and tombs.

Between 1949 and 1967, Israel accused the Jordanians of not protecting the site. As early as the end of 1949, Israeli viewers stationed on Mount Zion reported that Arab residents had been uprooting some tombstones. In 1954, the Israeli government filed a formal complaint with the UN General Assembly regarding the further destruction of graves and plowing in the area.

Israel also stated that in the late 1950s the Jordanian army used tombstones to build a military camp for the Arab Legion in nearby al-Eizariya to floor tents and toilets,; that some tombstones were transferred to the courtyard of the Citadel of David, where they were smashed; that their fragments were used as markers for the parade ground; and that when Jordan built new roads – one to the new Hotel Inter-Continental Jerusalem ("Seven Arches") on top of the Mount of Olives, one extending the road to Jericho, and one expanding the access road to the village of Silwan – numerous graves were destroyed in the process.

Shortly after 1967, these claims escalated into a war of words between Israeli Minister of Religious Affairs Zorach Warhaftig, who held a press conference condemning Jordan's destruction of Jewish graves and the Old City's synagogues, and the Custodian of the Holy Land, Franciscan Father Isaias Andrès, who complained that Warhaftig failed to mention that Muslim and Christian cemeteries had also been desecrated during the 1948 war.

=== Israeli rule ===
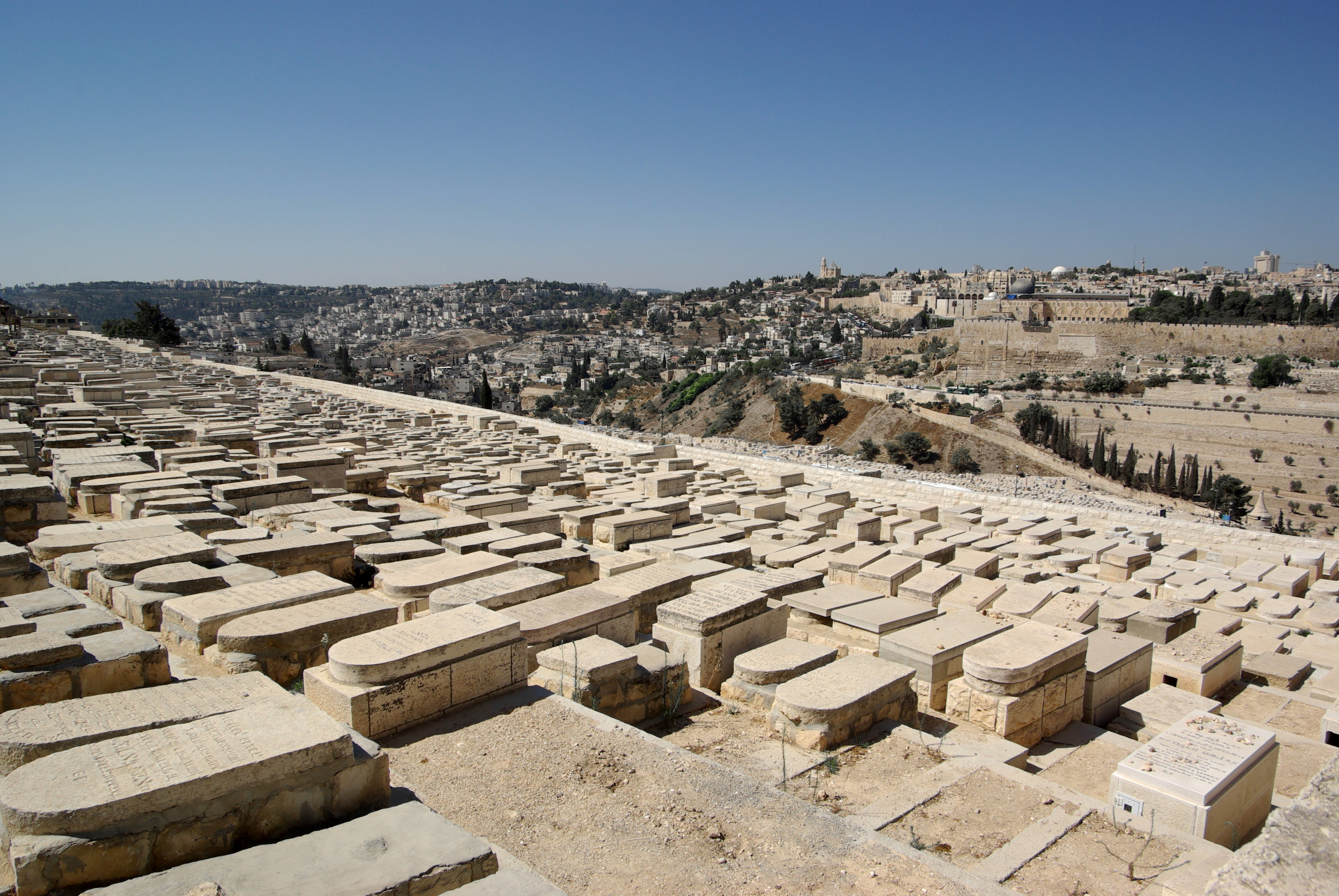
Jewish tombs in the Mount of Olives

In 1967, the Knesset passed the Protection of Holy Places Law, establishing legal protection for the Mount of Olives Cemetery and similar sites. The law established criminal penalties for anyone either desecrating such a site, or violating "the freedom of access of the members of the different religions to the places sacred to them." A 1981 amendment named 16 such places specifically, including the cemetery, although the law continues to protect all places considered holy by any religion.

In 1992, with the burial of Prime Minister Menachem Begin on the Mount of Olives, it was decided to establish a dedicated security company for the cemetery, and to increase the protection of visitors to the site. In 2005, acts of harassment against Jews intensified, and a guard unit was created for personal or group escort to those who came to the cemetery. In 2009, cars were attacked and many visitors were injured on the way to the cemetery. The "Jerusalem for generations" association turned to public figures, followed by a debate in the Knesset. In 2011, the chairman of the Almagor organization (terror victims association) was attacked and injured on his way to the graves of his Holocaust survivor parents. As a result, an attempt was made to increase public awareness of this attack and to mobilize the authorities and voluntary organizations against it. As of 2010, the security and personal escort service is free of charge, financed by the Ministry of Housing.

Till today, burial plots and tombs remain in a state of neglect. The plots of the graves suffer from vandalism, including the desecration of gravestones and the destruction of graves. A series of government decisions to rehabilitate parts of the mountain, as well as funds allocated for maintenance and renovation, have not yet succeeded in changing the situation.

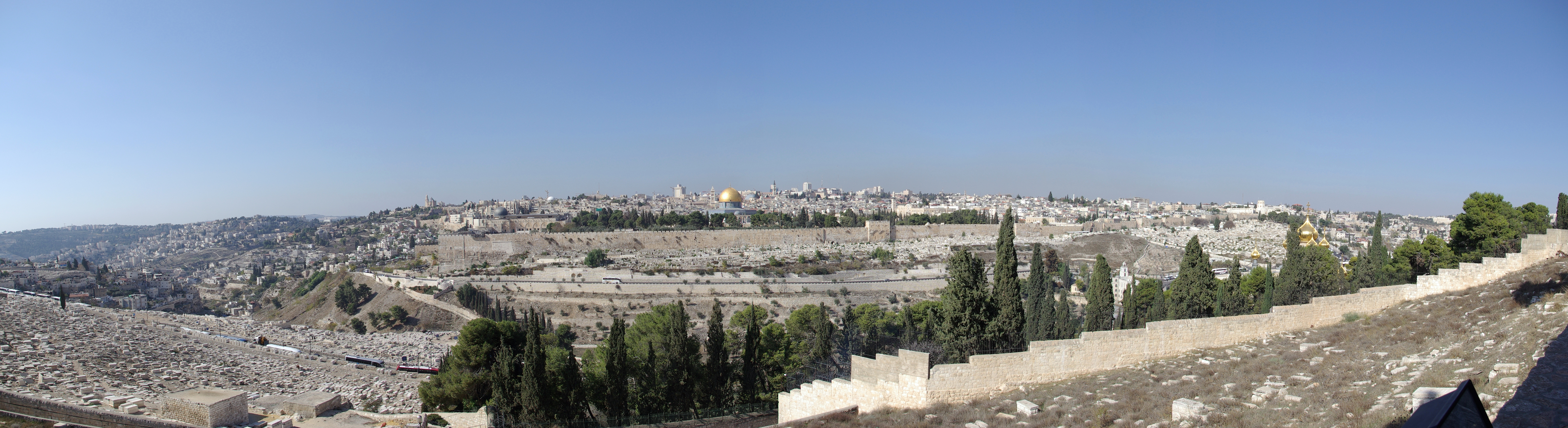
Panorama of the Temple Mount, seen from the Mount of Olives

== Notable graves ==
Many famous people are buried in the cemetery such as Rabbi Chaim ibn Attar, known as the Ohr ha-Chaim, and Rabbi Yehuda Alcalay who were among the heralds of Zionism; Hasidic rebbes of various dynasties and Rabbis of "Yishuv haYashan" (the old – pre-Zionist – Jewish settlement) together with Rabbi Avraham Yitzchak Kook, the first Ashkenazi Chief Rabbi, and his circle; Henrietta Szold, the founder of the Hadassah organization; the poet Else Lasker-Schüler, Eliezer Ben-Yehuda, the father of Modern Hebrew, Shmuel Yosef Agnon, the Nobel Laureate for Literature, and Boris Schatz, the founder of the Bezalel School of Art; Israel's sixth Prime Minister Menachem Begin; the victims of the 1929 Arab riots and 1936–39 Arab revolt, the fallen from the 1948 Arab–Israeli War, together with Jews of many generations in their diversity.

=== Rabbis and religious scholars ===
==== Early modern period ====
- Obadiah ben Abraham, the Bartenura (c. 1445 – c. 1515)
- Meir ben Judah Leib Poppers, Bohemian rabbi and kabbalist (c. 1624–1662)
- Judah he-Hasid (1660–1700), 17th-century immigration leader
- Ḥayyim ben Moshe ibn Attar, the Ohr ha-Ḥayyim (c. 1696–1743)
- Abraham Gershon of Kitov (1701–1761), brother-in-law of the Baal Shem Tov
- Shalom Sharabi, the Rashash (1720–1777)
- Zundel Salant (1786–1866), rabbi and primary teacher of Rabbi Yisrael Salanter

==== Late 19th century onward ====
- Elazar Abuchatzeira, rabbi and grandson of the Baba Sali
- Levi Yitzchok Bender, leader of the Breslov community in Uman and Jerusalem
- Avrohom Blumenkrantz, American Orthodox rabbi
- David Cohen (rabbi), the "Rav Ha-Nazir"
- Yehoshua Leib Diskin, rabbi in Brest (Belarus) and Jerusalem
- Shlomo Elyashiv, Lithuanian kabbalist
- Moshe Mordechai Epstein, rosh yeshivas Slabodka, Lithuania
- Nosson Tzvi Finkel, the Alter of Slabodka
- Zerah Flegeltaub, rabbi of Jerusalem and Suwałki, Poland, son of Rabbi Shlomo Flegeltaub of Warsaw
- Yitzchok Dovid Groner, director of Yeshivah Centre, Melbourne, Melbourne, Australia
- Shimon Hakham, Bukharian writer and translator of Jewish holy texts and stories in Judeo-Tajik
- Moshe Halberstam, rosh yeshivas Tschakava
- Yosef Hayyim, Baghdad-born rabbi and posek known as the Ben-Ish Hai (disputed)
- Yitzchok Hutner, rosh yeshivas Yeshiva Rabbi Chaim Berlin, Brooklyn, New York
- Aryeh Kaplan, American Orthodox rabbi and author
- Abraham Isaac Kook (1865–1935), first to hold Ashkenazi Chief Rabbinate of Israel position under British Mandatory Palestine. One of the fathers of Religious Zionism who founded Mercaz HaRav in 1924.
- Zvi Yehuda Kook, Rosh Yeshiva Mercaz HaRav Kook and son of Rav Abraham Isaac Kook
- Elyah Lopian, prominent rabbi of the Musar movement
- Avigdor Miller, American Orthodox rabbi, author, and lecturer
- Shlomo Moussaieff, Bukharian family patriarch
- Yaakov Mutzafi, head of the Sephardi Edah HaHaredith, Jerusalem
- Eliyahu David Rabinowitz-Teomim, rosh yeshivas Mir
- Yechezkel Sarna, rosh yeshivas Slabodka
- Chaim Pinchas Scheinberg, rabbi and Rosh Yeshiva of Torah Ore
- Gedalia Schorr, rabbi and Rosh Yeshiva of Torah Vodaas, Brooklyn, New York
- Sholom Schwadron, the "Maggid of Jerusalem"
- Dov Schwartzman, rosh yeshiva Yeshivas Bais HaTalmud, Jerusalem
- Avraham Shapira, rosh yeshivas Mercaz HaRav Kook
- Gedaliah Silverstone, rabbi in Belfast and Washington, D.C.
- Yaakov Chaim Sofer, the Kaf Hachaim
- Ahron Soloveichik, rosh yeshivas Brisk, Chicago, Illinois
- Pesach Stein, rosh yeshivas Telz, Cleveland, Ohio
- Yitzchok Yaakov Weiss, head of the Edah HaChareidis, Jerusalem

==== Hasidic Rebbes ====
- Simcha Bunim Alter, fifth Gerrer rebbe
- Yisrael Alter, fourth Gerrer rebbe
- Moshe Biderman, Lelover rebbe
- Mordechai Shlomo Friedman, Boyaner rebbe of New York City
- Levi Yitzchak Horowitz, second Bostoner rebbe
- Maiden of Ludmir, female Hasidic rebbe
- Yechiel Yehoshua Rabinowicz, Biala Rebbe
- David Matityahu Rabinowicz, the "Laheves David", Biala Rebbe and son of Rebbe Yechiel Yehoshua
- Isamar Rosenbaum, Nadvorna rebbe
- Shaul Yedidya Elazar Taub, Modzitzer rebbe

==== Chief Rabbis ====
- Solomon Eliezer Alfandari, Chief Rabbi of Damascus and Safed
- Meir Auerbach, first Ashkenazi Chief Rabbi of Jerusalem
- Chaim Berlin, Chief Rabbi of Moscow
- She'ar Yashuv Cohen, Chief Rabbi of Haifa
- Haim Moussa Douek, Chief Rabbi of Egypt
- Jacob Saul Elyashar, Sephardic Chief Rabbi of Ottoman Palestine
- Shlomo Goren, Ashkenazi Chief Rabbi of Israel
- Immanuel Jakobovits, Chief Rabbi of the United Hebrew Congregations of the Commonwealth, London
- Abraham Isaac Kook, Chief Rabbi of British Mandate Palestine
- Jacob Meir, Sephardic Chief Rabbi of British Mandate Palestine
- Meyer Rosenbaum, Chief Rabbi of Cuba
- Shmuel Salant, Ashkenazi Chief Rabbi of Jerusalem
- Yosef Chaim Sonnenfeld, Chief Rabbi of the Edah HaChareidis, Jerusalem
- Isser Yehuda Unterman, Ashkenazi Chief Rabbi of Israel
- Shlomo Zev Zweigenhaft, Chief Rabbi of Hanover and Lower Saxony

=== Businesspeople ===
- Sheldon Adelson, American Jewish businessman, investor, philanthropist, and political donor
- Harry Fischel, American Jewish businessman and philanthropist
- Robert Maxwell, British media magnate, fraudster, and supporter of Israel
- George Weidenfeld, British Jewish businessman and philanthropist

=== Cultural figures ===
- Shmuel Yosef Agnon, Israeli writer
- Nissim Behar, pioneer of modern Hebrew education
- Shmuel Ben David (1884–1927), illustrator, painter, typographer, and designer
- Eliezer Ben-Yehuda, father of modern Hebrew
- Levi Billig, Orientalist and Arabic scholar
- Jacob Fishman, American Yiddish newspaper editor
- Israel Dov Frumkin, Israeli journalist
- Uri Zvi Grinberg, Israeli poet and journalist
- Yossele Rosenblatt, hazzan and composer
- Boris Schatz, founder of the Bezalel School in Jerusalem
- Else Lasker-Schüler, German-Jewish poet
- Yosef Shenberger, Israeli architect
- Ephraim Urbach, Israeli scholar
- Warder Cresson, first American consul to Jerusalem (1844), proto-Zionist, Quaker convert to Mizrahi Judaism

=== Political figures ===
- Judah Alkalai (Yehuda Alcalay; 1798–1878), precursor of political Zionism
- Moshe Barazani, Lehi fighter
- Menachem Begin, Israeli prime minister
- Eliyahu Ben-Elissar, Israeli politician and diplomat
- Israel Eldad, Revisionist Zionist philosopher and fighter
- Meir Feinstein, Irgun fighter
- Jacob Israël de Haan, Dutch Jewish journalist assassinated by the Haganah
- Zevulun Hammer, Israeli politician, minister, and deputy prime minister
- Moshe Hirsch, rabbi, leader of Neturei Karta, anti-Zionist militant
- Ida Silverman, Jewish philanthropist, speaker, and Zionist fund-raiser
- Henrietta Szold, founder of Hadassah, the Women's Zionist Organization of America
- Dawid Wdowiński, founder of the ZZW

=== Figures from science ===
- Israel Jacob Kligler, microbiologist, main actor in the eradication of malaria in Mandatory Palestine
- Jacob Lahijani, scientist and inventor

=== Terror victims ===
- Eliyahu Asheri, Israeli terror victim
- Gavriel and Rivka Holtzberg, Israeli terror victims
- Zvi Kogan, Israeli-Moldovan terror victim
- Rachel, Netanel, Rephael and Ephraim Weiss, victims of the Jericho bus firebombing
- Abraham Zelmanowitz, American victim of the September 11 attacks
