= Avigdor Miller =

American Haredi rabbi

Rabbi Avigdor Miller
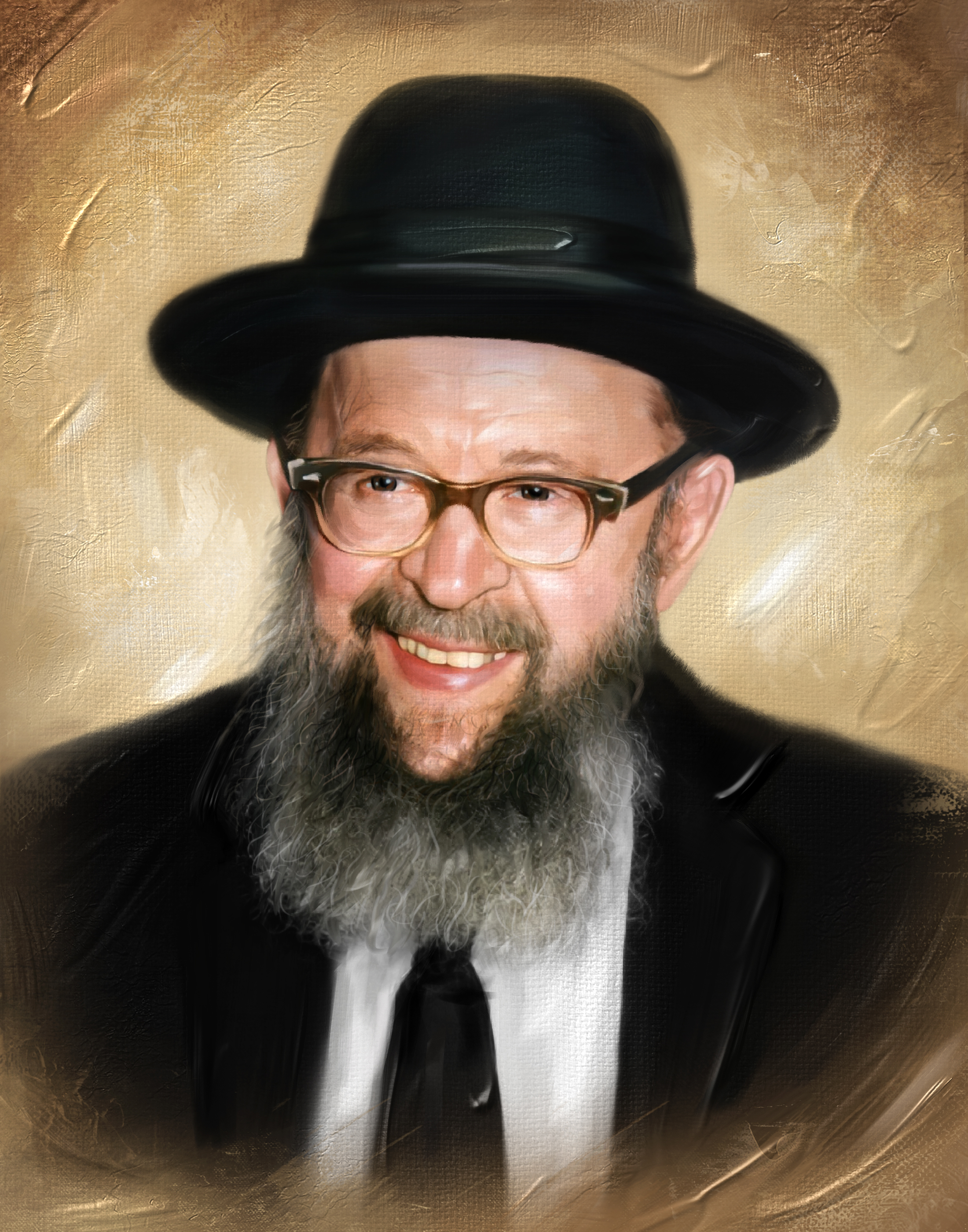
- Portrait of Miller

Personal life
- Born: Victor Miller; August 28, 1908 Baltimore, Maryland, United States
- Died: April 20, 2001 (aged 92) Brooklyn, New York, United States
- Buried: Mount of Olives, Jerusalem, Israel
- Spouse: Ettel
- Education: Yeshivas Knesses Yisrael (Slabodka)

Religious life
- Religion: Judaism
- Denomination: Haredi Judaism

Jewish leader
- Position: Rabbi
- Synagogue: Bais Yisroel of Rugby Torah Center
- Yeshiva: Yeshiva Rabbi Chaim Berlin
- Yahrtzeit: 27 Nisan
- Semikhah: Rabbi Isaac Elchanan Theological Seminary

Avigdor HaKohen Miller (August 28, 1908 – April 20, 2001) was an American Haredi rabbi, author, and lecturer.

He served simultaneously as a communal rabbi, mashgiach ruchani (spiritual supervisor) of Yeshiva Rabbi Chaim Berlin, and as a teacher in Beis Yaakov. After his son opened Yeshiva Beis Yisrael in 1986, Miller served as its rosh yeshiva (dean).

Miller was an American-born, European-trained rabbi immersed in the demanding Lithuanian academic and mussar traditions. As one of the earlier prominent rabbis to use the medium of tape to distribute Torah lectures to the public, he reached a broad audience.

== Early life ==
Miller was born Victor Miller in Baltimore, Maryland. He was a kohen. His father's name was Yisroel, and his mother's name was Hoda Riva Miller.

Although he attended public school, only Yiddish was spoken at home. After school, he attended an afternoon Talmud Torah. When he finished his regular classes at the Talmud Torah, the school arranged for him to learn privately with Avrohom Eliyahu Axelrod, a Lubavitcher Hasid. The Talmud Torah was unable to pay Axelrod, but he continued to teach Miller anyway. Miller would never forget that Axelrod taught him without being paid, and spoke about him with appreciation.

At age 14, Miller went to New York City to attend Yeshivas Rabbenu Yitzchok Elchonon, at the time the only American high school offering high-level Jewish learning. After this, he enrolled in Yeshiva College. He graduated from both Yeshiva College and Rabbi Isaac Elchanan Theological Seminary (RIETS), attaining a B.A. and rabbinical ordination, respectively.

While a student at Yeshiva College, Miller joined a chaburah (study group) together with a few other young men to study Mussar from the sefer Mesillas Yesharim. The organizer of the chaburah, which met in Miller's dormitory room, was Yaakov Yosef Herman, a builder of Orthodox Judaism in New York City of the early 20th century. Some of the men in this group, which included Nosson Meir Wachtfogel, Yehuda Davis, and Mordechai Gifter, would go on to become notable Haredi rabbis in their own right. Herman encouraged Miller to travel to Europe to learn Torah in the yeshivas there. Miller met Isaac Sher, the son-in-law of Nosson Tzvi Finkel, who was in New York collecting funds for the Slabodka yeshiva at the time. Sher did not raise much money, since this was during the Great Depression. But Sher would later declare this to be his most successful trip to America, since he was able to recruit and bring such a bright student to Slabodka.

In 1932, at the age of 24, Miller arrived in Europe to study at the Slabodka yeshiva in Slabodke, Lithuania, where he was greeted personally by Avraham Grodzinski, the mashgiach ruchani (spiritual supervisor). While there, he studied under Sher. As a student in Slabodka, Miller was so diligent in his studies that he wore out his shirtsleeves over the lectern he was using. He was compelled to wear a coat during the summer, in order to conceal the multitude of overlapping patches that were his trousers. Rabbi Shulman of Slabodka, a son-in-law of Sher, introduced Miller to Ettel Lessin, daughter of Yaakov Moshe HaCohen Lessin of Slabodka (later mashgiach in RIETS). They were married in 1935.

== Rabbinic career ==
In 1938, due to the rise of Nazism and the tensions leading up to World War II, Miller sought to return to the United States with his wife and two sons. The American consul in Kovno at the time was a public high-school classmate and acquaintance of Miller's from Baltimore. He arranged passage for Miller's wife and children, who were not United States citizens.

Upon returning to the U.S., Miller became rabbi of Congregation Agudath Shalom in Chelsea, Massachusetts. Initially, the community was taken aback by Miller's audacious pedagogy, and the sheer volume of his Torah presentations, attempting in vain to restrain his unconventional approach. Within a few years, however, the community had changed their minds, desiring for Miller to stay longer. Miller received special dispensation to refrain from sending his young sons to public school. Instead, he had them tutored privately in secular subjects, and taught them Jewish studies himself. His sons still needed to appear at the public school twice a year for testing. This arrangement seemed to Miller to not be ideal; so, he began to look for a community with a stronger Jewish presence.

In 1944, Yitzchak Hutner, rosh yeshiva (dean) of Yeshiva Rabbi Chaim Berlin, hired Miller to become its mashgiach ruchani, in which position he served until 1964. In 1945, he assumed the pulpit of the Young Israel of Rugby in East Flatbush, Brooklyn. In 1975, with neighborhood demographics changing, Miller established the Bais Yisroel of Rugby Torah Center on Ocean Parkway in Midwood, Brooklyn. In 1986, when his son opened Yeshiva Beis Yisrael, Miller served as its rosh yeshiva.

== Legacy and views ==
Miller authored several books about Jewish history, Jewish thought and other subjects. Over a span of 50 years, more than 2,500 lectures by Miller in English were published as cassette tapes, as well as several in Yiddish. He gave most of his lectures in his Midwood synagogue. While also covering Torah-oriented concepts that might have been heard in more typical Orthodox lectures, Miller regularly delivered his own unique take on political and societal themes.

Miller's views on race were controversial. He believed it is not appropriate to make fun of people due to their race. He stated "to make leitzanus of [make fun of] people because they’re black or brown doesn’t make sense at all. Being black or brown is no sin. You can’t make leitzanus [fun] about that." He also believed that all Americans, including African Americans, have a right to equality. He stressed that it needs to be done peacefully and through legal means. However, he also criticized the Emancipation Proclamation, saying that it would have been better for African Americans to have endured another 50 to 100 years of slavery in order to "civilize" them. When asked "Someone told me that you said that slavery wasn't wicked", Miller responded "I didn't say that it wasn't a wickedness to enslave people. I said the literature about slavery is often exaggerated - it's not the full picture."

Miller was a supporter of police brutality against criminals. Before the 1976 elections he said, "We need more police brutality. And although innocent people might suffer sometimes, it pays." After the Kent State shootings, where three Jewish and one non-Jewish student were shot by the Ohio National Guard at an anti-Vietnam War protest, Miller stated he sent a letter of congratulations to the government, saying

In America, these liberal bums were ruining the campuses. They were bums and they deserved to be shot; no question about it! I sent a letter to the government congratulating them.

He said in another Q & A "We should put American flag stickers on our automobile windows. We should display signs, “We support our boys in Vietnam,” or wherever they are. All the peace talk is nothing but communist-inspired talk and don’t be deceived about that. All the liberals in the colleges have been tainted by the ferment of communism. Don’t be deceived! They have only one purpose and that is to destroy the country."

Miller was outspoken in his belief that the Holocaust was a divine response to Jewish cultural assimilation in Europe. He wrote:

Hitler was not only sent by Heaven, but was sent as a kindness from Heaven... Because assimilation and intermarriage are worse than death ... and the German Jews and others ignored the Torah-teachers and refused to desist from their mad race into assimilation, the Nazis were sent to prevent them and rescue them before they were swallowed up by the nations.

Miller was a staunch opponent of Zionism, in both its religious and secular forms, and was known to help the Satmar Hasidim translate their anti-Zionist ads in The New York Times.

Miller was known to lambaste other Orthodox Jewish organizations, such as the Orthodox Union, for allowing the teaching of the scientific theory of evolution. He referred to the killer of Harvey Milk, the first openly gay man to be elected to public office in California, as a "decent gentile".

He also spoke out against the internet and social media.

== Bibliography ==
Miller's books include:

Year	Title	ISBN/ASIN
1962	Rejoice O Youth!	ISBN 1-60796-296-9
1968	Behold A People	ASIN B00147BDGI
1971	Torah Nation	ASIN B001N1HBJS
1973	Sing You Righteous	ASIN B0032CITKG
1980	Awake My Glory	ASIN B000HWDAVW
1987	The Beginning	ASIN B00279K63I
1991	Exalted People	ASIN B0006YP7EE
1991	A Nation is Born	ASIN B002BA11DC
1994	A Kingdom of Priests	
1995	The Universe Testifies	ASIN B0032CJ32O
1996	Ohr Olam (Hebrew 10 vol.) (adapted from Miller's tapes )	
1997	Journey into Greatness	ASIN B001CDB5DU
2000	Career of Happiness	ASIN B0032CDSZM
2001	A Fortunate Nation	ASIN B0032C93L0
2002	Lev Avigdor (לב אביגדור)	
2003	Praise My Soul	ISBN 1-931681-48-1
2003	The Path of Life (Rabbi Y. Denese)	
2006	The Making of a Nation Haggadah (Rabbi Betzalel Miller)	
2012	Rav Avigdor Miller on Emunah and Bitachon (Rabbi Yaakov Astor)	ASIN: B008560RXQ
2012	Purim with Rabbi Avigdor Miller - צהלה ושמחה	
2013	A Divine Madness (annotations and historical commentary by Darrell M. Zaslow)	ISBN 978-0-9896219-0-8
2019	Rav Avigdor Miller on Olam Haba	
