= Yitzchak Isaac Sher =

Rabbi

Rabbi Yitzchak Isaac Sher הרב יצחק אייזיק שר

Personal life
- Born: 1874/1875 Hlusk, Russian Empire present-day Belarus
- Died: February 6, 1952 Bnei Brak, Israel
- Buried: Beis HaChaim Shomrei Shabbos
- Spouse: Maryasha Gittel Sher (née Finkel)
- Children: 2

Religious life
- Religion: Judaism
- Denomination: Orthodox Judaism

Jewish leader
- Predecessor: Rabbi Moshe Mordechai Epstein
- Successor: Rabbi Mordechai Shulman
- Yeshiva: Slabodka Yeshiva, Lithuania; Slabodka Yeshiva, Bnei Brak
- Position: Rosh yeshiva
- Began: 1928
- Ended: 1952
- Yahrtzeit: 10 Shevat

Rabbi Yitzchak Isaac Sher (Hebrew: יצחק אייזיק שר) was the rosh yeshiva of the Slabodka Yeshiva in Lithuania and Bnei Brak. He was the son-in-law of Rabbi Nosson Tzvi Finkel, the Alter of Slabodka.

== Early life ==
Sher was born in Halusk, Belarus c. 1875. After completing cheder, he and other students began attending a class given by Baruch Ber Leibowitz, who was the city's rabbi at that time. He then studied in the Volozhin Yeshiva under Refael Shapiro. After hearing a lecture from the Alter of Slabodka in Halusk, Sher joined his yeshiva in Slabodka, Yeshiva Knesses Yisrael, where he studied with Avraham Grodzinski (later a mashgiach ruchani (dean of students) in the yeshiva).

In 1903 Sher married Maryasha Gittel Finkel, a daughter of the Alter of Slabodka. The couple moved to Kelmė where he developed a close relationship with Simcha Zissel Ziv (the Alter of Kelm). He studied for a short time in the Mir Yeshiva, which was led by his wife's brother, Eliezer Yehudah Finkel.

=== Early teaching career ===
Sher soon returned to Slabodka, and in 1911 he was given a teaching position in his father-in-law's yeshiva. In addition to teaching a class on Gemara, he also gave them mussar (rebuke to improve their character). This was the first time that a teacher in the Slabodka Yeshiva fulfilled these two roles. The Alter of Slabodka appointed him to this position to show the students that studying Torah as well as mussar do not conflict with each other. (Both in 1897 and in 1904, there were uprisings of students against the study of mussar in the yeshiva). He stayed with the yeshiva throughout their travels during World War I, to Minsk and Kremenchug.

== Slabodka Kollel ==
In 1921, the Alter founded the Beis Yisrael Kollel (commonly referred to as the "Slabodka Kollel"), and Sher became the rosh kollel (head of the kollel). The top students from the Slabodka Yeshiva were chosen to join the kollel, including Dovid Leibowitz and Yaakov Kamenetsky. Rabbis David Rappoport and Yaakov Yitzchak Ruderman were among the members who joined the kollel later.

It was during Sher's time as rosh kollel that he began writing his sefer, Beis Yisrael. The kollel would later merge with the Kovno Kollel.

== Rosh Yeshiva ==
Between 1925 and 1928, much of the Slabodka Yeshiva relocated to Hebron in Mandatory Palestine, including the rosh yeshiva Rabbi Moshe Mordechai Epstein. Rabbi Sher was then appointed rosh yeshiva while Rabbi Ber Hersh Heller continued to serve as mashgiach ruchani, alongside his son-in-law Rabbi Avraham Grodzinski. As rosh yeshiva, the financial burden of the institution fell on him, and Rabbi Sher therefore traveled to America several times to raise funds for the yeshiva.

=== World War II ===
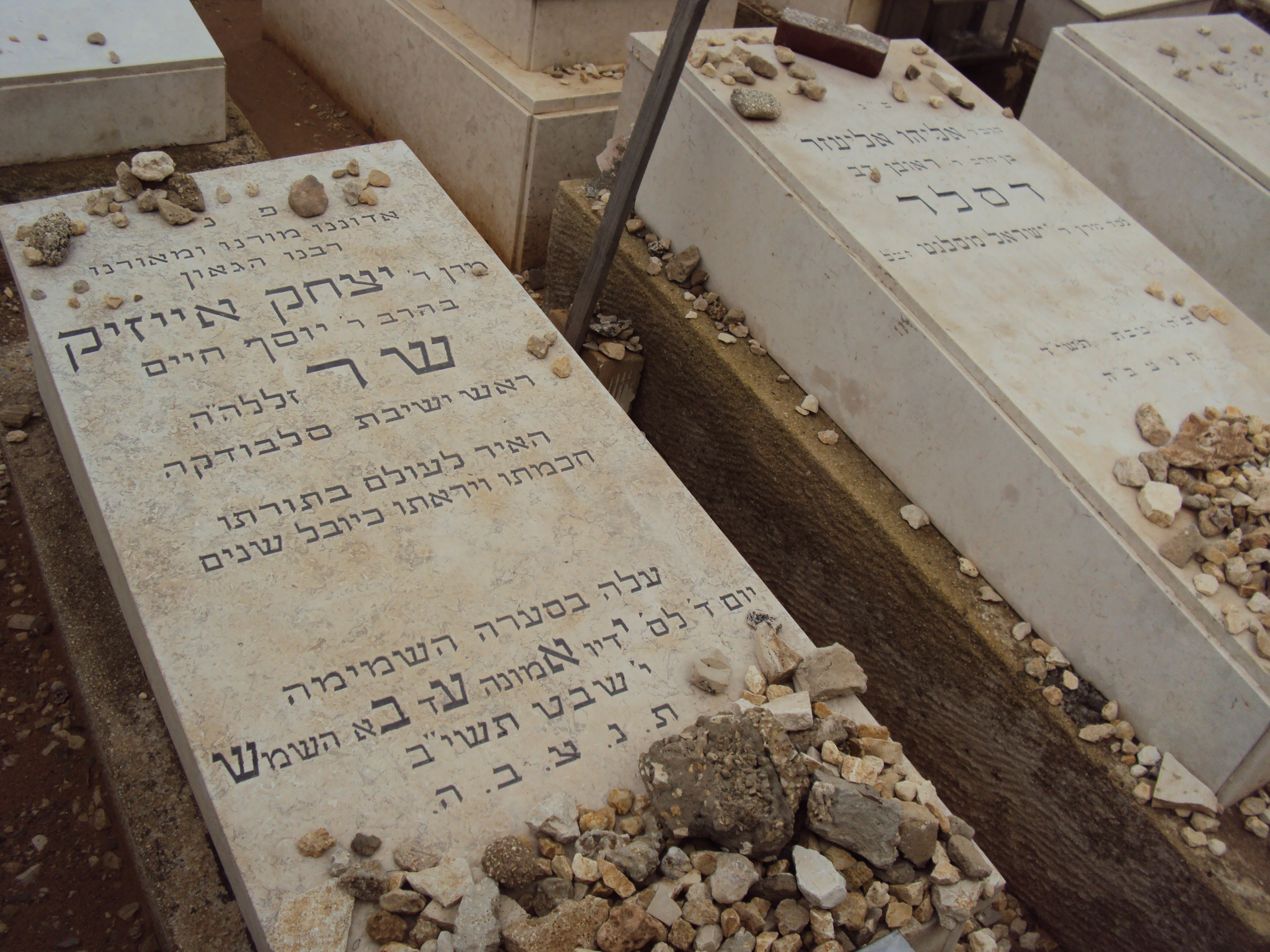
Sher's grave, with visitation stones

Shortly before the outbreak of World War II, Rabbi Sher, who was in poor health, had gone to a spa in Switzerland, and was therefore spared from the Nazi killings that left thousands murdered in Kaunas and Slabodka, including Rabbi Grodzinski and the students of the yeshiva. During the war, he moved to Jerusalem, where the Chevron Yeshiva had since moved to.

=== Bnei Brak ===
In 1947, at the advice of the Chazon Ish, Sher reestablished the European branch of Slabodka in Bnei Brak, together with his son-in-law Rabbi Mordechai Shulman. He was also part of the Moetzes Gedolei HaTorah in Israel and wrote the sefer Avraham Avinu.

On February 6, 1952, Sher died after a heart attack. At his funeral, which was attended by thousands of people, eulogies were given by rabbis Yosef Shlomo Kahaneman and Elya Lopian. His grandson-in-law is Moshe Hillel Hirsch, Slabodka rosh yeshiva in Bnei Brak.
