= Meir Chadash =

Rabbi Meir Chadash (alternatively transliterated as Meir Chodosh) (Hebrew: מאיר חדש; 1898-1989) was the mashgiach of the Hebron Yeshiva and a leading mussar disseminator in the 20th century.

Chadash was a talmid muvhak (primary student) of Rabbi Nosson Tzvi Finkel (often referred to as the "Alter (elder) of Slabodka"). His strength was described as "adaptation and modification" of the Alter's teachings to "the nascent yeshiva world of Eretz Yisroel" both before and especially "after the war".

== Early life ==
Chadash was born 27 Shvat 5658 (February 19, 1898) to Ben Tzion and Machla Chadash, who were living at the time in Paritch, (jewish "Lithuania", today Belarus). Two older siblings were his brother Dovid and his sister Gronia. He married Tzivia Leah Hutner, a daughter of Rav Naftali Menachem Hutner, in 1927. At age ten he was sent to a yeshiva in Shklov, Belarus. Somewhat before reaching bar mitzvah his cousin took him to Slabodka.

== Hebron ==
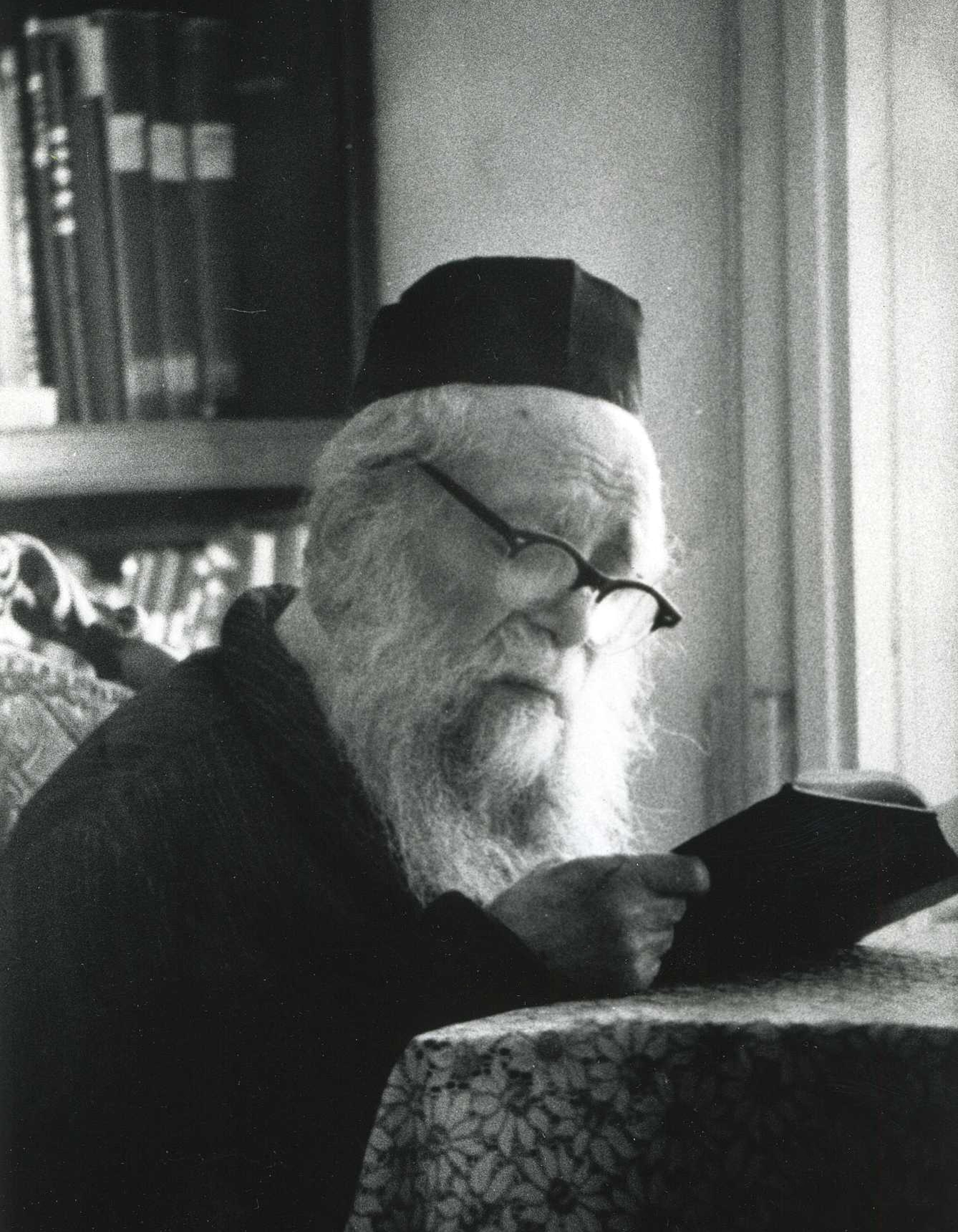
Rabbi Meir Chadash

When military draft exemptions for yeshiva students were cancelled in Lithuania, the Alter sent a group to found what became the Hebron Yeshiva. Chadash was in "the final group of students" to move what was left of their yeshiva.

His approach was described as "innovative teachings" based on "never said anything that he had not heard from" yet, when facing something new, to "say what his rebbe would have said" because he would "work out how his rebbe would have approached" the situation. By the time of the Alter's death, Meir had advanced to be described as "the Alter's close disciple and confidant." Rabbi Yechezkel Sarna later said it was like "the closeness of Yehoshua bin Nun to Moshe Rabbenu."

An explanation he gave for why he asked all visitors to leave his hospital room when a certain medical staff member entered was: "difficulty locating my veins. I didn't want the visitors to see him fumbling, because he might have been embarrassed. That is why I asked them to leave."
