= Ephraim Epstein =

Orthodox rabbi and prominent member of the Jewish community in Chicago

Rabbi Ephraim Epstein
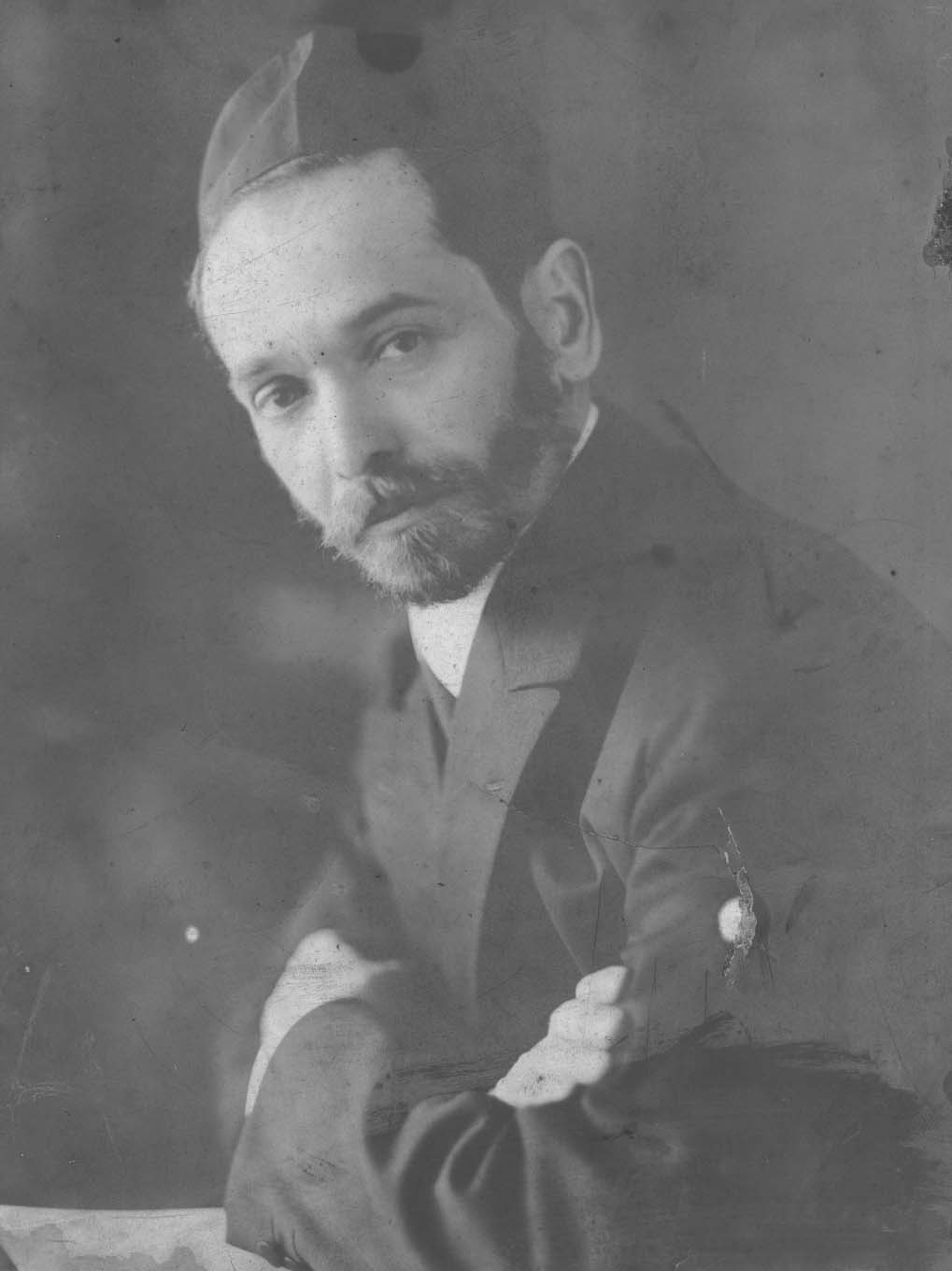

Rabbi of Congregation Anshei Kneseth Israel, Chicago
- In office 1911–1960

Personal life
- Born: 1876 Bakst, Lithuania
- Died: 1960 (aged 83–84)
- Education: Slabodka yeshiva
- Occupation: Rabbi

Religious life
- Religion: Judaism
- Denomination: Orthodox

Rabbi Ephraim Epstein (1876–1960) was an orthodox rabbi and prominent member of the Jewish community in Chicago in the half-century after his arrival in Chicago in 1911.

== Biography ==
Epstein was born in Bakst, Lithuania and trained in yeshiva at Slabodka yeshiva, where his brother, Rabbi Moshe Mordechai Epstein served as the dean.. He arrived in Chicago in 1911 after being asked to serve as rabbi at Congregation Anshei Kneseth Israel, one of the leading Orthodox congregations in the city. He served as rabbi of the congregation for almost 50 years. Epstein was a renowned Talmud scholar.

Epstein rose to prominence in Chicago's orthodox Jewish community through his many activities outside the synagogue. He raised millions of dollars for aid to European yeshivas during and after World War I. In addition, Epstein served as an officer with a number of other Jewish self-help organizations, including the Central Relief Committee of America, Relief Committee of Jewish War sufferers, and the Federation of Orthodox Charities.

A son was tragically killed in a fire. Another son, Aaron David Epstein, was murdered by rioters in the Hebron massacre of 1929.

During the World War II, Epstein helped rescue many Jews from Europe.

His son, Harry H. Epstein (1903-2003), was a prominent rabbi in the Conservative movement, spending over 50 years in the pulpit at Congregation Ahavath Achim in Atlanta, Georgia.
