= Avrohom Eliyahu Kaplan =

Ashkenazi Orthodox rabbi

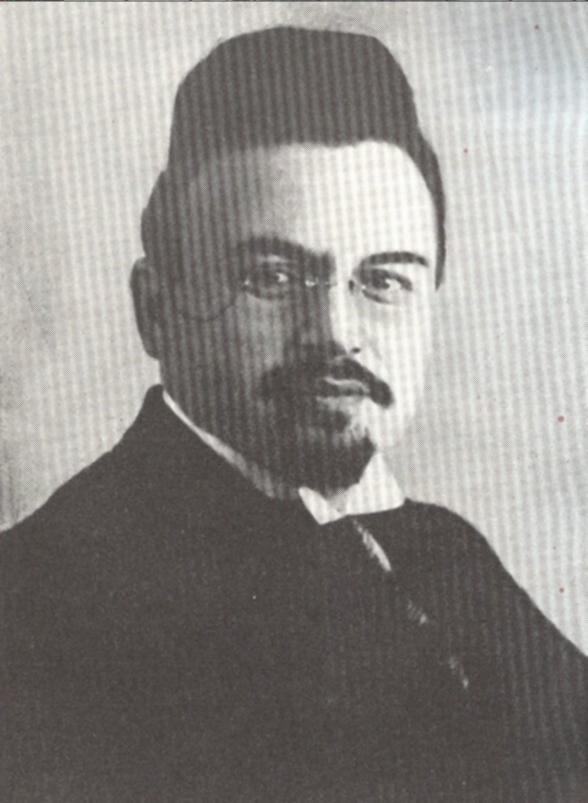
Avrohom Eliyahu Kaplan

Avrohom Eliyahu (Elya) Kaplan (Hebrew: אברהם אליהו קפלן; 1890–1924) was a prominent Ashkenazi Orthodox rabbi. He was born in Kėdainiai, a town in the Kaunas County in Lithuania. He was born an orphan, and named Avrohom Elya for his deceased father, who had died suddenly at the age of 33 several months before his son's birth. At about this time, Reb Avraham Elya's mother remarried a man from Telshe (Reb Avraham Elya was very close to his stepfather, and called him "The Father").

Avraham Elya studied for several years in the renowned Yeshiva of Telshe. His poetic and passionate nature became legendary even at a young age. At 16, he was drawn to the spirit of the Mussar movement, and went to learn in the Talmud Torah in Kelm, the yeshiva founded by Rabbi Simcha Zissel Ziv. He left Kelm, however, shortly after his arrival and went to the famed yeshiva in Slabodka headed by Rabbi Nosson Tzvi Finkel, known as the "Alter of Slabodka", and Rabbi Moshe Mordechai Epstein, known by his pen name, "Levush Mordechai". Avraham Elya studied in Slabodka for seven years, until the outbreak of World War I left him stranded in his mother's home in Telshe. In Slabodka, Reb Avraham Elya found the path that he had sought, in trying to reconcile the Mussar philosophy of Lithuanian Judaism with the philosophy of Hasidic Judaism. At the age of 30 he was appointed as Rosh Yeshiva of the Hildesheimer Rabbinical Seminary in Berlin.

In 1919, Rabbi Kaplan gave a eulogy (hesped) for Theodor Herzl in the City of Telz. This eulogy is translated from Yiddish to Hebrew in B'Ikvot HaYir'a.

He died suddenly when he was only 34 years old, about the same age as his father. In his youth (at the age of seventeen), his fiery nature induced him to compose a poem portraying impending doom and angst. This famous poem, Shak'a Chama, contains a sense of depression and searching. It begins: "The sun has set... my soul has set / In the depth of its sorrow as great as the sea..." (B'Ikvot, p. 171).

== Works ==
- B'Ikvot HaYir'a, Mosad HaRav Kook, 1956. Reprinted in 1988 in an expanded edition, and again in 2002.
- Divrei Talmud, 2 volumes, Mosad HaRav Kook, 1958. Reprinted in 1970.
- Mivchar Ketavim, privately published by the Kaplan family, 2006.

These works were all compiled and edited by Rabbi Kaplan's son, the noted author Rabbi Tzvi Kaplan.
