= Dov Tzvi Heller =

Lithuanian Haredi rabbi (1862–1935)

Rabbi Dov Tzvi Heller רב דוב צבי העלער

Personal life
- Born: 1862 Šilalė, Russian Empire present-day Lithuania
- Died: 1935 (aged 72–73) Jerusalem, Mandatory Palestine present-day Israel
- Spouse: Feiga Esther Heller née Blankfield
- Children: Avraham Meir Heller; Chasya Grodzinsky; Ita Ettel Kamenetsky; Kayle Heller; Sara Vernoskovsky
- Parents: R' Eliezer Yitzchak (father); Hasseh Gisseh Heller (mother)

Religious life
- Religion: Judaism

Jewish leader
- Position: Mashgiach ruchani
- Yeshiva: Knesses Yisrael Slabodka

Dov Tzvi Heller (1862 – 1935) commonly called by his Yiddish name, Ber Hirsch Heller, was a rabbi and mashgiach ruchani at the Slabodka Yeshiva in Europe, as well as the father-in-law of Rabbi Yaakov Kamenetzky and Rabbi Avraham Grodzinski.

== Life ==
Dov Tzvi Heller was born in 1862 in Shilel (Šilalė), Lithuania, then part of the Russian Empire. In 1890, he became the mashgiach ruchani in the Yeshiva Knesses Yisrael Slabodka under Nosson Tzvi Finkel, where he was known for his sweet personality, gentleness, and love of his students, which was so strong, that he would often fast for their success. During World War I, the yeshiva escaped to Minsk, and later many of them Kremenchug, and Heller came with the yeshiva on these travels. Shimon Reuven Dvoretz, who was teenager in Kremenchug, described Heller as "a saint, a Chafetz Chaim in his simplicity," comparing him to Yisrael Meir Kagan, who had been the greatest rabbi of the time until his death a few years prior.

== Family ==
Heller was married Feiga Esther Heller née Blankfield. Their third daughter to live adulthood, Sara (1899-1941), married Shabsi Vernokovsky, and they both were murdered in the Holocaust.

== Death ==
Heller died in 1935 in Jerusalem.
