= Meyer Juzint =

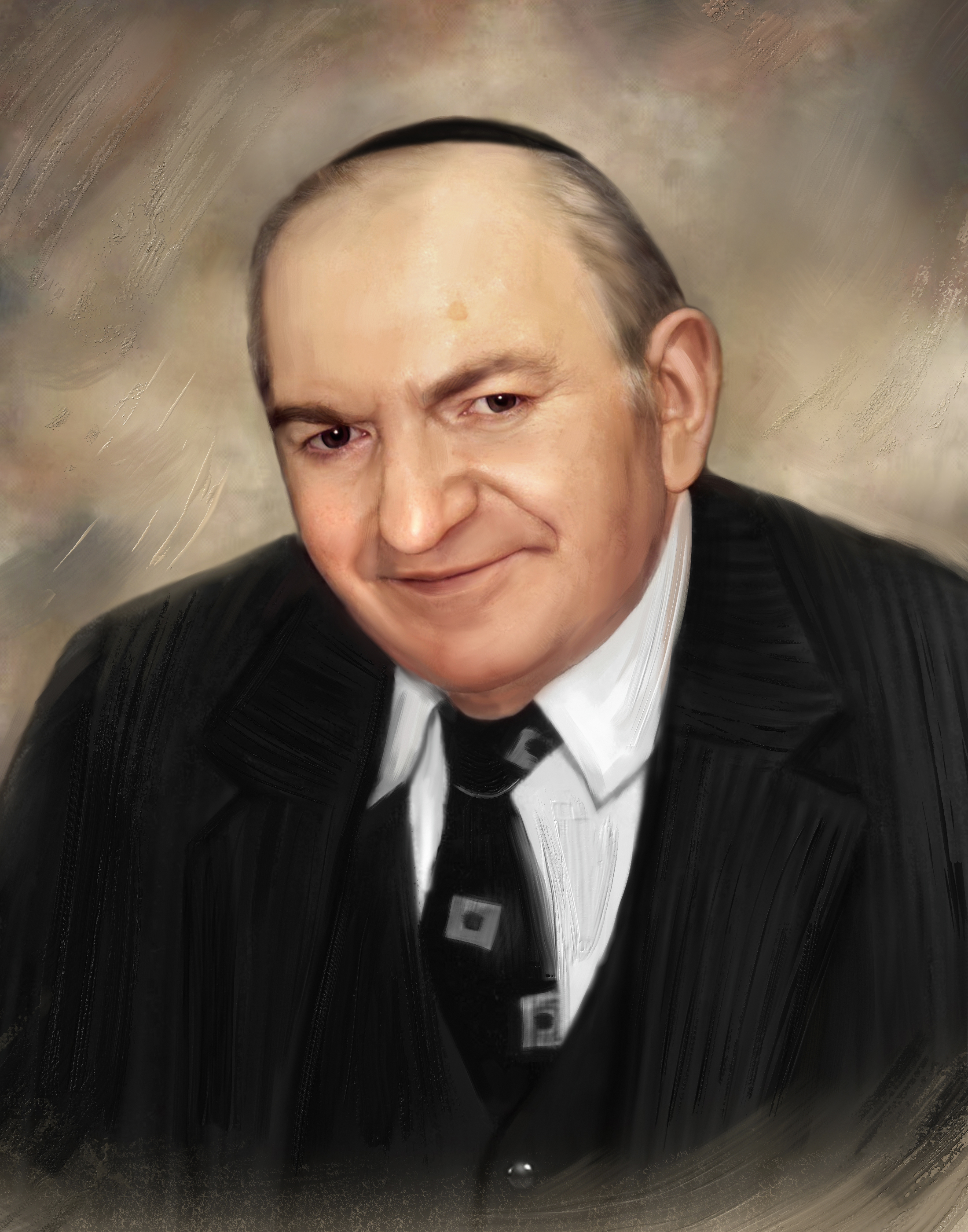
Painting of Juzint

Meyer Juzint (June 15, 1924 – October 3, 2001) was a rabbi, talmudic scholar and faculty member of the Ida Crown Jewish Academy in Chicago, and the Hebrew Theological College in Skokie, Illinois.

== Biography ==
Juzint was born in Šeduva (Shaduva), Lithuania, outside of Kovno, and studied at the nearby Slabodka yeshiva until the start of World War II. As a young student he was imprisoned at the Auschwitz and Bergen-Belsen concentration camps. The Jews of Seduva, including all the other members of his family there, were murdered by the Nazis in 1941. Following his liberation in Europe, Juzint moved to the United States, getting a job as a Jewish educator in the late 1940s in Chicago.

From 1950 until 2000, he taught hundreds of students. He never married and his only relatives were cousins in Chicago, Israel and South Africa.

He was also a poet and author who published books on Talmud and Jewish philosophy.

Juzint was buried in Israel.

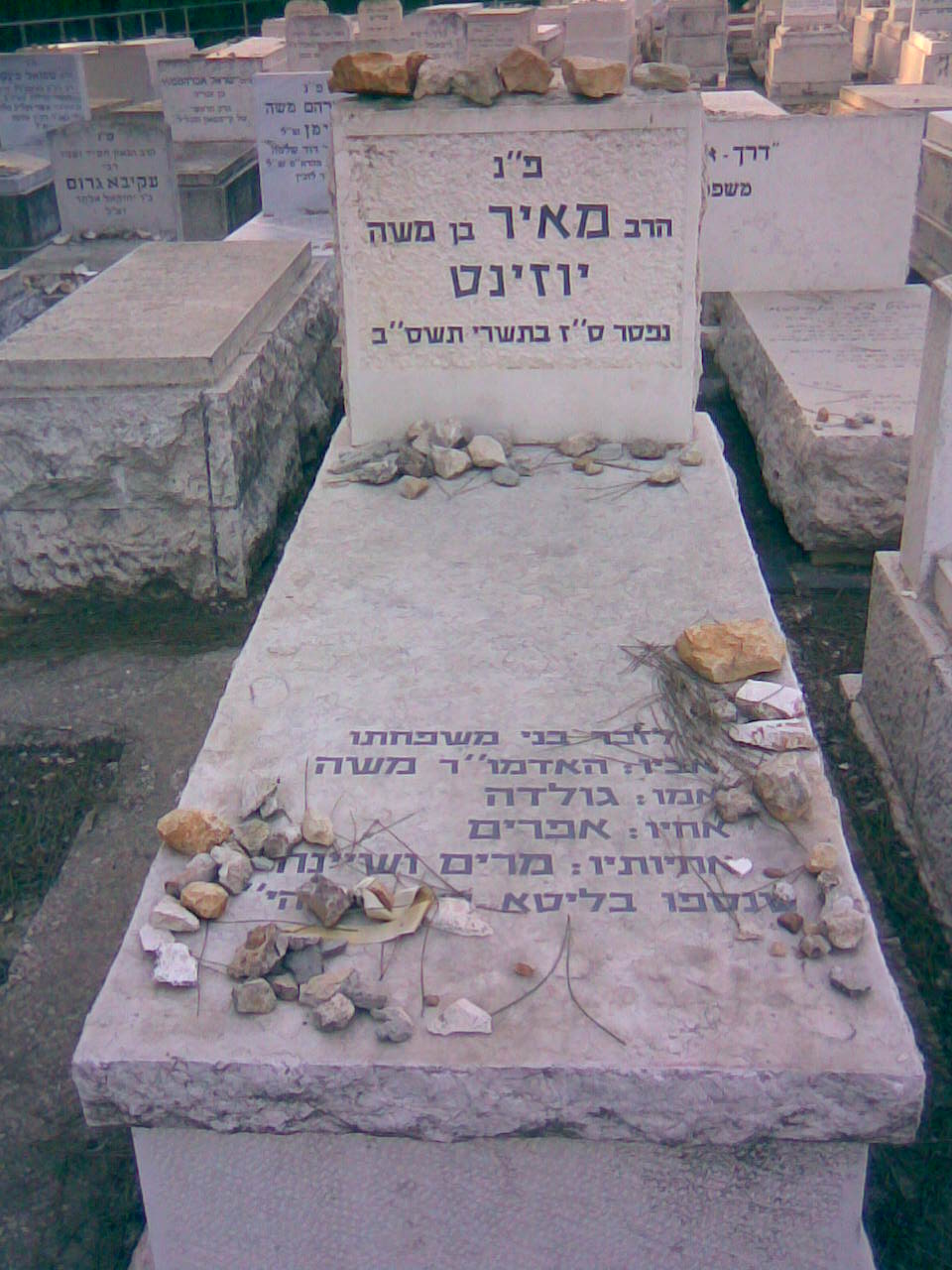
Juzint's grave, with visitation stones

== Publications ==
- Juzint, Meyer (1947). Bluṭḳe lider (First ed.). Chicago. loc 77952098.
- Juzint, Meyer (1957). Neḥamat Meʹir (First ed.). Chicago. loc 57056648.
- Juzint, Meyer (1960). Shire Metsar Ve-Tikvah (First ed.). Chicago. loc 64039615.
- Juzint, Meyer. Laws pertaining to prayer and tefillin.
