= Harry Austryn Wolfson =

American scholar, philosopher and historian (1887–1974)

Harry Austryn Wolfson (November 2, 1887 – September 19, 1974), born Zvi Hershel ben Mendel Wolfson, was an American philosopher and historian at Harvard University, where he became the first chair of a Jewish Studies Center in the United States. Best known for his seminal work on the Jewish philosopher Philo, Wolfson also produced major studies on Crescas and Spinoza, examined Averroes and Maimonides in the context of medieval and early modern thought, and wrote on the Kalam, the Church Fathers, and the foundations of Western religion. He aimed to bridge Jewish philosophy with Christian philosophy and Islamic philosophy. As the first Judaica scholar to spend his entire career at a top university, Wolfson embodied the ambitions of the 19th-century Wissenschaft des Judentums (science of Judaism, or Jewish studies) movement.

== Biography ==
Wolfson was born to Sarah Savitsky and Max Mendel Wolfson in Astryna (Yiddish: Ostrin), Vilna Governorate (in present-day Shchuchyn district, Grodno Region, Belarus), and in his youth he studied at the Slabodka yeshiva under Rabbi Moshe Mordechai Epstein. He emigrated to the U.S. with his family in 1903. They settled in New York's East Side. Wolfson was invited to teach Hebrew to children in Scranton, Pennsylvania, which he did for three years while earning his diploma from Scranton High School. Wolfson took the entrance examination for Harvard College and won admission.

In September 1908, Wolfson arrived in Cambridge, Massachusetts to attend Harvard University, where, it would turn out, he would remain for the rest of his career. He earned his bachelor's degree in 1911, Master's in 1912, and Ph.D. in 1915. His only absences were the years 1912–1914, when he held a traveling fellowship from Harvard which enabled him to study and do research in Europe, and some months in 1918 when he was conscripted into the Army, and together with Norbert Wiener received basic training at Fort Slocum, New York, and was then transferred to the Adjutant General's Office in Washington, D.C..

Wolfson was offered an appointment as annual instructor in Jewish philosophy and Literature at Harvard University in 1915, provided he could find outside funding for his salary, which judges Julian Mack and Irving Lehman took responsibility for. He was promoted to faculty instructor and then assistant professor in 1921. In 1925 his position was to be terminated unless he could obtain permanent outside funding. Lucius Littauer stepped up and endowed him a permanent chair in his father's honor, the Nathan Littauer Professor of Hebrew Literature and Philosophy. Wolfson was the first professor in any American university to occupy a chair devoted solely to Jewish studies.

Wolfson held the chair from 1925 until his retirement in 1958. He was a student and friend both of George Santayana and George Foot Moore. R.D. Crouse, the scholar of early medieval theology, was among his students. He received honorary degrees from 10 different universities (Twersky 1975), and was a founding member and president of the American Academy for Jewish Research. Wolfson never married. He died in Cambridge, Massachusetts on September 19, 1974. His brother Nathan survived him by 27 years, living to age 101 until 2001. Another notable family member was his nephew Erwin S. Wolfson who developed the Pan Am Building in Manhattan in 1960.

== Works ==
Wolfson was a tireless scholar. About him Twersky (1975) writes, "He was reminiscent of an old-fashioned gaon, transposed into a modern university setting, studying day and night, resisting presumptive attractions and distractions, honors and chores, with a tenacity which sometimes seemed awkward and antisocial." He spent vast amounts of time secluded in the Widener Library pursuing his research. Schwarz (1965) writes that even in his retirement, Wolfson was "still the first person to enter Widener library in the morning and the last to leave it at night."

Wolfson wrote works including a translation and commentary on Hasdai Crescas' Or Adonai, the philosophy of the church fathers, the repercussions of the Kalam on Judaism, and works on Spinoza, Philo, and Averroes. The best-known of these works are listed below, their publication in several instances—among them the work on Philo—having been considered scholarly events of the first magnitude.

Wolfson was additionally known as a "daring" scholar, one who was not afraid to put forward a bold hypothesis with limited evidential support. In his work Wolfson therefore often chooses bold conjecture over safe, but boring, analyses (Twersky 1975).

=== Books ===
- Crescas' Critique of Aristotle: Problems of Aristotle's Physics in Jewish and Arabic philosophy (1929)
- The Philosophy of Spinoza: Unfolding the Latent Processes of His Reasoning, Harvard University Press (1934/1962).
- Philo: Foundations of Religious Philosophy in Judaism, Christianity and Islam, Harvard University Press (1947). Until the publication of this book, Philo had been considered no more than a preacher with a philosophic bent. Wolfson showed that behind the philosophic utterances scattered throughout Philo's writings there lay a coherent philosophic system. Wolfson went even further, claiming that Philo was the founder of religious philosophy in Judaism, Christianity, and Islam, and that "Philonic" philosophy dominated European thought for 17 centuries until it was destroyed by Spinoza, the last of the medievals and the first of the moderns.
- The Philosophy of the Church Fathers: Volume I Faith Trinity, Incarnation, Harvard University Press (1956)
- The Philosophy of the Kalam, Harvard University Press (1976)
- Repercussions of the Kalam in Jewish philosophy, Harvard University Press (1979)

=== Articles ===
A complete bibliography of Wolfson's work can be found in Schwarz (1965). He was known principally, as mentioned above, for crossing all artificial boundaries of scholarship, as best revealed by the titles of some of his papers:

- The meaning of "Ex Nihilo" in the Church Fathers, Arabic and Hebrew philosophy, and St. Thomas (1948)
- The double faith theory in Clement, Saadia, Averroes and St. Thomas, and its origin in Aristotle and the Stoics (1942)
- The internal senses in Latin, Arabic, and Hebrew philosophical texts (1935)
- The amphibolous terms in Aristotle, Arabic philosophy, and Maimonides (1938)
- Solomon Pappenheim on time and space and his relation to Locke and Kant, pp. 426–440 in Jewish studies in memory of Israel Abrahams, Press of the Jewish Institute of Religion (1927)

== Awards and honors ==
- 1933: Elected to the American Academy of Arts and Sciences
- 1949: National Jewish Book Award in the Jewish Thought category for Philo: Foundations of Religious Philosophy in Judaism, Christianity and Islam
- 1956: Elected to the American Philosophical Society
