= Simcha Zissel Broide =

Israeli rabbi

- שמחה זיסל ברוידא
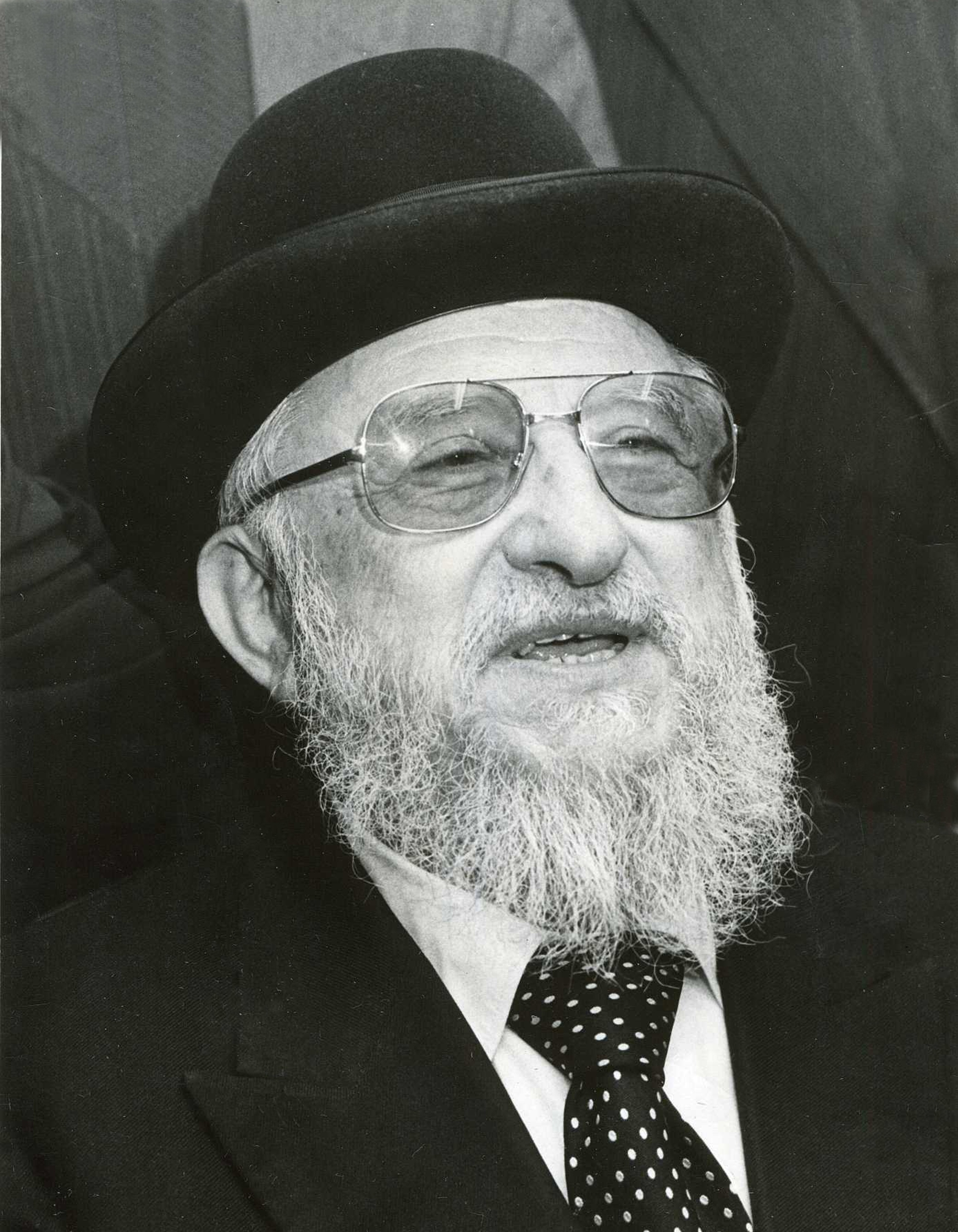
- Born: 1912; Jerusalem
- Died: 21 April 2000 (aged 87–88)
- Occupation: Rosh yeshiva

Rabbi Simcha Mordechai Zissel Ziskind Broide (Hebrew: שמחה זיסל ברוידא; 1912 – 21 April 2000) served 40 years as Rosh Yeshiva of Yeshiva Knesses Yisroel Chevron, beginning with his appointment in 5721 (1960/61). He also authored a sefer named VeSam Derech.

== Biography ==
Simcha Zissel was born to Rabbi Chizkiyahu Avrohom in Jerusalem in the month of Adar 5672 (1912).

He was not in Chevron the day of the 1929 massacre.

He died on 21 April 2000 (16 Nisan), the day before Shabbos Chol HaMoed Pesach (age 88). Despite religious prohibitions for eulogies during the holiday except for great scholars, "a huge throng estimated by police to be around 100,000, headed by HaRav Yosef Shalom Elyashiv," did so Sunday morning, one of the intermediary days.

Eight years later he was described as "one of the great mussar educators of our generation."
