= Astryna =

Astryna Астрына (Belarusian) Острино (Russian) Ostrino
- Urban-type settlement
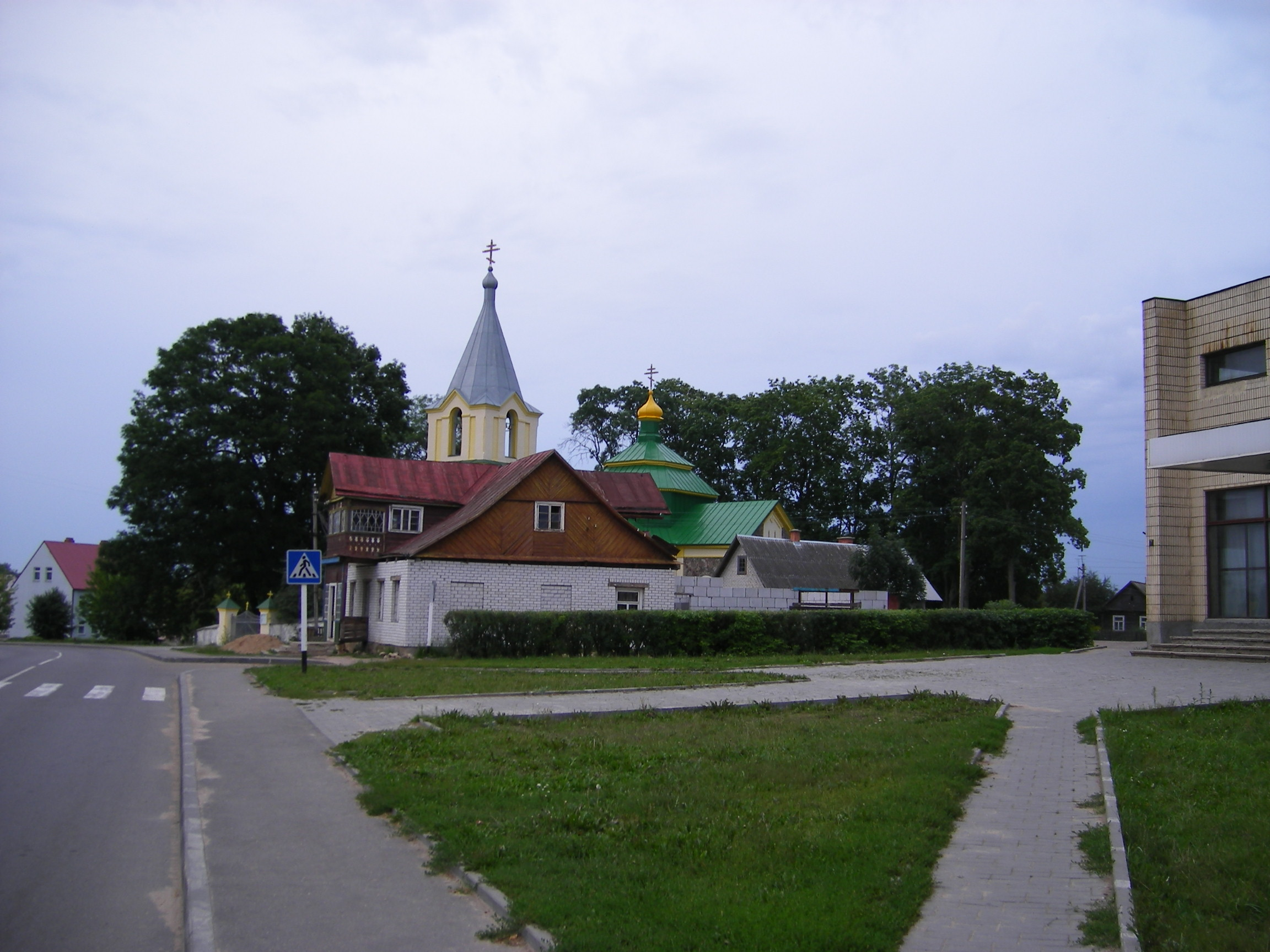

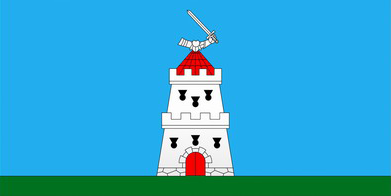
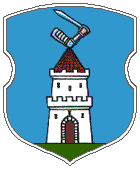
- Flag Coat of arms

- Location within Belarus
- Coordinates: 53°44′N 24°32′E
- Country: Belarus
- Region: Grodno Region
- District: Shchuchyn District

Population (2025)
  - Total: 1,529
- Time zone: UTC+3 (MSK)

Astryna or Ostrino (Note: Belarusian: Астрына; Russian: Острино; Polish: Ostryna; Yiddish: אַסטרין.) is an urban-type settlement in Shchuchyn District, Grodno Region, Belarus. In 2015, its population was 1,847. As of 2025, it has a population of 1,529.

The settlement is located 19 kilometres (12 mi) north-east from Shchuchyn and 47 kilometres (29 mi) east from Grodno.

== History ==
Astryna was first mentioned in 1450. In 1921, its population of 1,572 included 1,067 Jews.

During World War II, the city was occupied by German troops from June 1941 unil July 1944. An open ghetto was established in October 1941. There were also Jews from others villages, including Vasilishki or Dembrovo. Shortly after October 12, 1941, about 80 Jews from the ghetto were executed at the Jewish cemetery. There were also frequent, isolated shootings of Jews in the Jewish cemetery. At the end of October 1942, the ghetto was liquidated and the Jews transported to a transit camp in Kolbassino, south of Grodno. Initially jailed in the Kolbassino camp for about a month, with about 22,000 to 28,000 Jews from nearby communities, the Ostrino Jews were sent to the Auschwitz extermination camp at the end of November 1942. Remains at the Jewish cemetery were exhumed during the recent construction of a gas pipe.

== Notable people ==
- Harry Austryn Wolfson (1887–1974), historian and professor at Harvard University
