= Yechiel Yaakov Weinberg =

Polish rabbi (1884–1966)

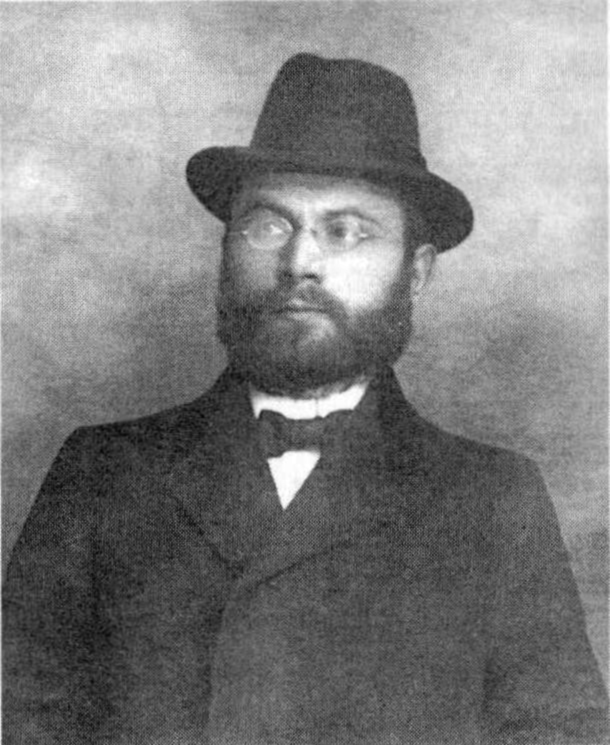
Weinberg (1914 or earlier)

Yechiel Yaakov Weinberg (1884–1966) was an Ashkenazi Orthodox rabbi, posek ("decisor" of Jewish law) and rosh yeshiva. He is best known as the author of the work of responsa Seridei Eish.

== Biography ==
Yechiel Yaakov Weinberg was born in Ciechanowiec, which was then part of the Grodno Governorate of the Russian Empire and now located in Poland. He studied at the yeshivas of Mir and Slabodka. In the latter, "he combined within himself Lithuanian profound understanding of Halacha with the Slabodka musar expounded by the illustrious Alter, Rabbi Nosson Tzvi Finkel."

In 1906 he married 16-year-old Esther Levine, daughter of the deceased Rabbi Yaakov Meir of Pilvishki. They would later divorce and Weinberg would remain single. He also became rabbi of this city, both the spiritual rabbi and crown rabbi, and served for seven years. At the outbreak of World War I, he went to Germany. There he studied at the University of Giessen. His doctoral research on Targum was supervised by Paul E. Kahle. Although Polish-born and Lithuanian-trained, Weinberg "developed an extremely beautiful German prose style which was matched only by his mastery of modern Hebrew." He taught at and eventually became rector (rosh yeshiva) of the Hildesheimer Rabbinical Seminary in Berlin. His students included Rabbis Menachem Mendel Schneerson, Eliezer Berkovits, Giuseppe (Yoseph) Laras and Josef Hirsch Dunner.

As rosh yeshiva, Weinberg emerged as a leading advocate of Neo-Orthodoxy, the German approach to Orthodox Judaism, based on the Torah im Derech Eretz of Rabbi Samson Raphael Hirsch. Although Torah im Derech Eretz was "an ideology that he had openly opposed in his youth," Weinberg "championed" this approach during his tenure at the Hildesheimer seminary, and he "played and was to play a seminal part in the reconciliation of Torah orthodoxy with modernity." His "melding of sources, methods, and worlds was unparalleled in modern halachic literature. It required breadth and depth of knowledge that were, and remain, rare."

Weinberg was offered the position of head of the prestigious London Beth Din by Chief Rabbi Joseph Hertz in 1934. But following pressure from his students in Berlin, Weinberg turned the offer down, after which it was offered to Dayan Yehezkel Abramsky who held the position for almost twenty years.

In 1939, he fled Nazi Germany, and became trapped in the Warsaw Ghetto, where he was a prominent leader. Because of his Russian citizenship, the Germans imprisoned him together with Russian prisoners of war, enabling him to avoid the concentration camps and to survive the war. After the war, a loyal student, R. Shaul Weingort, brought him to Montreux, Switzerland, where he lived until his passing in 1966. Despite many offers of prominent rabbinic positions across the globe, Weinberg chose not to leave Switzerland, where he penned many influential and important responsa.

== Works ==
- Seridei Eish ("Remnants of the Fire") Responsa dealing with halachic questions addressed to Weinberg from all over the world concerning the great problems of modern life - technological, social and personal. It was first published in four volumes by Mossad Harav Kook in Jerusalem (1961, 1962 and 1966 - just before Weinberg's passing) and has been republished as Shut Seridei Eish (1999). "These four volumes have already become classics in the world of halachic literature... Like all great responsa works, [these] are - apart from their intrinsic halachic value - a faithful mirror of the time in which they were written and no doubt will become a fertile source for the research of future Jewish historians and sociologists".
- Mechkarim beTalmud ("Investigations of the Talmud") documents Weinberg's studies on Talmudical methodology. It was published in 1938 while Weinberg was rosh yeshiva of the Orthodox Rabbinical Seminary in Berlin. This publication laid the foundation for Weinberg's responsa. It contains not only a great number of sugyos, explained in a novel manner, but may be considered a handbook on Talmudic methodology. This work is considered "no less classical than his responsa". In it, "the traditional Lithuanian [method of study] and the modern scientific approach to the study of Talmud became an organic unity".
- Other works by Weinberg include:
  - Chidushei Baal "Seridei Eish" (Jerusalem, 2005).
  - Li-ferakim (2002); discussions on mussar, aggada and midrash, and contemporary issues.
  - Kitvei ha-Gaon Rabbi Yechiel Yaakov Weinberg zatsal (2 vols., Scranton, 1998, 2003).
  - Pinui atsmot metim (Berlin, 1926).

== External links and references ==
=== Bibliography ===
- Shapiro, Marc B. Between the Yeshiva World and Modern Orthodoxy: The Life and Works of Rabbi Jehiel Jacob Weinberg, 1884-1966. London; Portland, Or.: Littman Library 1999.
- Navot, Anat. Ben ha-chiloni le-mumar ha-dat ba-eit ha-chadashah : mishnatam ha-hilchatit shel ha-rabanim ha-leumiyim - Yitzchak Halevi Hertzog, Ben Tsiyon Meir Uziel ve-Yehiel Yaakov Weinberg. Beer Sheva: Universitat Ben-Gurion ba-Negev, 2005.
- Weingort, Avraham Aba. Erev iyun be-mishnato shel ha-Rav Weinberg: yom ha-zikaron - 4 Shevat 5757. Jerusalem: 1997.
- Bleich, Judith. Between East and West : modernity and traditionalism in the writings of Rabbi Yehi’el Ya’akov Weinberg. Engaging Modernity (1997) 169-273
- Chamiel Ephraim, The Dual Truth, Studies on Nineteenth-Century Modern Religious Thought and its Influence on Twentieth-Century Jewish Philosophy, Academic Studies Press, Boston 2019, Vol II, pp. 368-406.

=== Biography ===
- Obituary by Dayan Dr. I. Grunfeld
- OU biography of Rav Weinberg
- The Legacy of Yehiel Jacob Weinberg - (Review of Shapiro, Marc B. Between the Yeshiva World and Modern Orthodoxy: The Life and Works of Rabbi Jehiel Jacob Weinberg, 1884-1966. London; Portland, Or.: Littman Library 1999.)

=== Articles and Halacha ===
- Rabbi Weinberg on the Teachings of Rabbi Samson Raphael Hirsch (Hebrew), daat.ac.il
- Partial list of specific halachic issues addressed by Rabbi Weinberg
- Rav Weinberg's view of the prohibition on stealing a mitzvah
- Rav Weinberg's view on kol isha
- Rabbi MM Schneerson, Lubavitcher Rebbe Receives Smicha From Rabbi Weinberg
- Rav Avraham Abba Weingort remembers the Seridei Eish (Mishpacha Magazine)
- Rabbi Weinberg memorial event at Ganzach Kiddush Hashem
- Conversation between Rabbi Weinberg and Yaakov Herzog
