= Yeshivas Knesses Yisrael (Slabodka) =

Former yeshiva in Vilijampolė, Lithuania

- הישיבה הקדושה כנסת ישראל בסלבודקה-קובנה
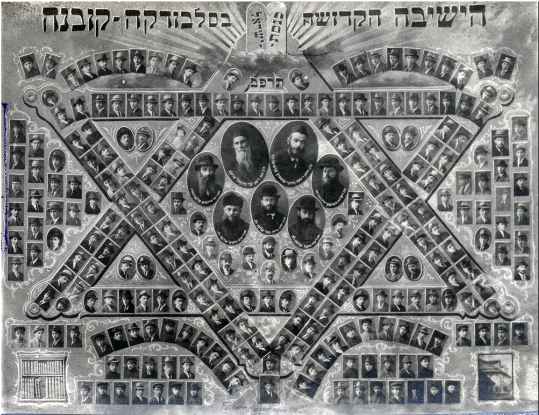
- Portraits of rabbis and students, 1922

Location
- Vilijampolė; Lithuania; 54.910623°N 23.886702°E

Information
- Other name: Slabodka Yeshiva
- Type: Mussar
- Religious affiliation: Orthodox Judaism
- Established: 1882
- Founder: Nosson Tzvi Finkel
- Closed: c. 1941
- Dean: Moshe M. Epstein; Yitzchak Isaac Sher
- Staff: Dov Tzvi Heller; Avraham Grodzinski
- Enrollment: 350 (1920s)

Yeshivas Knesses Yisrael (Yiddish: סלאבאדקער ישיבה; Lithuanian: Vilijampolės (Slabados) ješiva) was a yeshiva located in the town of Vilijampolės Slabada in the Kovno Governorate of the Russian Empire (now Vilijampolė in Kaunas, Lithuania). It operated from the late 19th century until World War II and was a site of the Kaunas pogrom in 1941.

== Origins ==
From the second half of the 19th century onwards, Kovno became a hub of Jewish cultural activity in Lithuania. Prominent scholars included Yitzchak Elchanan Spektor (the "Kovner Rav"; officiated 1864–96), Abraham Mapu, one of the first modern Hebrew writers, and Israel Isidor Elyashev, known as the "Ba'al Makhshoves," the first Yiddish literary critic. The yeshivot of Slobodka, particularly the Or HaChaim yeshivah founded by Tzvi Levitan around 1863 (also known as Yeshivas R' Hirschel), attracted students from other countries. Nosson Tzvi Finkel, also known as "Der Alter fun Slabodka" (The Elder of Slabodka), who had also founded several kollelim in the area, served as mashgiach ruchani (spiritual supervisor) and introduced Musar ideals there.

In 1882, Nosson Tzvi Finkel merged his kollelim and the Ohr Hachaim yeshiva to form the "Slabodka Yeshiva". (Note: It is unclear if the name "Knesses Yisrael" was introduced then or later in 1897, when the yeshiva split over the mussar approach between Knesses Yisrael, named after Yisrael Salanter, and Knesses Beis Yitzchak, named after Yitzchak Elchanan Spektor.) Finkel oversaw the institution while Yitzchak Yaakov Rabinowitz was appointed rosh yeshiva, a position he held until 1893. After his departure, Finkel appointed two brothers-in-law, Moshe Mordechai Epstein and Isser Zalman Meltzer, as rosh yeshivas. Meltzer left three years later to lead the Slutsk Yeshiva of the Ridvaz.

== Division ==
In 1897, opposition to the Musar method emerged among the students, leading to a split in the yeshiva. The Musar movement followers moved to a separate building, while the opponents established the Knesses Beis Yitzchak yeshivah, named after Yitzchak Elchanan Spektor. Finkel, a strong proponent of the Musar movement, led the Knesses Yisrael faction. Epstein, who remained loyal to Finkel, continued his role at Knesses Yisrael despite being offered the position of rosh yeshiva at Knesses Beis Yitzchak.

Although there was initial rivalry between the two institutions, they eventually achieved a peaceful coexistence. This was largely due to Epstein becoming a posek in Slabodka under Moshe Danishevky, who served as Knesses Beis Yitzchak's rosh yeshiva, facilitating cooperation between the two rosh yeshivas.

== World War I ==
Shortly after World War I began in 1914, some members of the yeshiva, including Finkel, Epstein, and the mashgiach ruchani Ber Hirsch Heller, fled Slabodka for Minsk, which was farther from the front lines. When the Germans started bombing Minsk, most of the yeshiva moved to Kremenchug, though a small group remained in Minsk under the leadership of Finkel's son, Moshe Finkel. The yeshiva in Kremenchug had approximately 40 to 50 students, in addition to the teachers and their families. In 1920, the yeshiva was prepared to return to Slabodka. They traveled through Minsk and Vilnius, and had to pay smugglers to cross the Russian-Lithuanian border.

== Partial relocation to Palestine ==
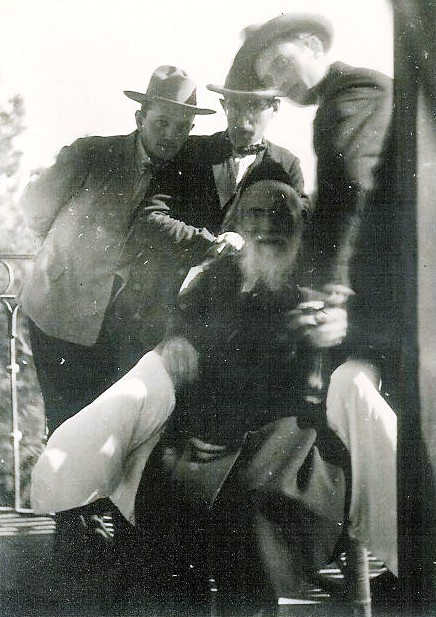
The Alter of Slabodka surrounded by students in Hebron.

A 1924 edict mandating military enlistment or supplementary secular studies in the yeshiva prompted many students from the Slabodka yeshiva to relocate to Mandatory Palestine. The Alter of Slabodka sent Avraham Grodzinski and Yechezkel Sarna to Palestine to find a suitable location for the yeshiva, and they chose Hebron. The staff of the yeshiva in Lithuania was divided between the original Lithuanian yeshiva and the new Hebron branch, known as the Hebron Yeshiva. Epstein was appointed rosh yeshiva in Hebron, while Finkel and Yehuda Leib Chasman served as mashgiachs. In Lithuania, Finkel's son-in-law Yitzchak Isaac Sher became rosh yeshiva, with Ber Hirsch Heller and Grodzinski serving as mashgiachs. Following the 1929 Hebron massacre, which resulted in the murder of twenty-four students, the yeshiva was re-established in the Geula neighbourhood of Jerusalem.

== Holocaust and relocation to Israel ==
After World War II, the original yeshiva building was confiscated by the Communist Party of the Soviet Union. The building, with its unique design—shaped like a Torah scroll—is still visible today in Lithuania. The yeshiva was reestablished by Sher in Bnei Brak, Israel as Slabodka yeshiva Bnei Brak.

== Prominent alumni ==
=== Rabbis ===
- Israel Bettan, American rabbi and professor
- David Cohen, rabbi, talmudist, philosopher and kabbalist
- Tzvi Hirsch Ferber, rabbi in Soho, London
- Eliezer Yehuda Finkel, rosh yeshiva of Mir yeshiva in both Poland and Jerusalem
- Tzvi Pesach Frank, halakhic scholar and Chief Rabbi of Jerusalem
- Avraham Grodzinski, mashgiach ruchani, Slabodka yeshiva
- Reuven Grozovsky, rosh yeshiva, Yeshiva Torah Vodaas
- Yosef Zvi HaLevy, Israeli rabbi and head of the rabbinical court for Tel Aviv-Yafo
- Yitzchok Hutner, rosh yeshiva, Yeshiva Rabbi Chaim Berlin
- Meyer Juzint, American Talmudic scholar
- Avraham Kalmanowitz, rosh yeshiva, Mir yeshiva in Brooklyn, New York
- Yaakov Kamenetsky, rosh yeshiva, Yeshiva Torah Vodaas
- Avraham Elya Kaplan, rosh yeshiva, Hildesheimer Rabbinical Seminary
- Aharon Kotler, rosh yeshiva, Beth Medrash Govoha
- Dovid Leibowitz, rosh yeshiva, Yeshivas Rabbeinu Yisrael Meir HaKohen
- Yehuda Levenberg, chief rabbi and rosh yeshiva in New Haven, CT
- Yeruchom Levovitz, mashgiach ruchani, Mir yeshiva (Belarus)
- Avigdor Miller, mashgiach ruchani, Yeshiva Rabbi Chaim Berlin, and community rabbi
- Ephraim Oshry, Lithuanian-born posek, rabbi of Beth Hamedrash Hagodol and Holocaust survivor
- Eliezer Palchinsky, rosh yeshiva, Yeshivas Beis Aryeh, Jerusalem
- Shlomo Polachek, Talmudic scholar and one of the earliest rosh yeshivas in America
- Pesach Pruskin, rabbi and rosh yeshiva in Kobrin
- Yaakov Yitzchok Ruderman, rosh yeshiva, Yeshivas Ner Yisroel, Baltimore
- Yechezkel Sarna, rosh yeshiva, Hebron yeshiva
- Elazar Shach, rosh yeshiva, Ponovezh yeshiva
- Moshe Shatzkes, Polish-born rabbi and rosh yeshiva, Yeshivas Grodno
- Zalman Sorotzkin, Polish-born rabbi
- Isaac Stollman, rabbi, author and religious Zionist leader
- Naftoli Trop, rosh yeshiva, Raduń Yeshiva
- Yechiel Yaakov Weinberg, rosh yeshiva, Hildesheimer Rabbinical Seminary

=== Other ===
- Gedaliah Alon, Israeli historian
- Pessah Bar-Adon, Israeli archaeologist and writer
- Ezriel Carlebach, journalist and editorial writer
- Ben-Zion Dinur, Zionist activist, educator, historian and Israeli politician
- Lazarus Goldschmidt, writer and translator of the Babylonian Talmud into German
- Saul Lieberman, professor of Talmud, Jewish Theological Seminary of America
- Harry Austryn Wolfson, Harvard University scholar
- Moshe Zilberg, Israeli jurist

== See also ==
- Kovno Kollel, a Musar-type yeshiva in nearby Kaunas
- Kelm Talmud Torah, another Musar-type Lithuanian yeshiva
- Chaim of Volozhin
- Rabbi Moshe Mordechai Epstein (1866–1933) — studied under Rabbi Chaim Soloveitchik at Volozhin Yeshiva and subsequently became Slabodka's long-serving rosh yeshiva.
