= Yechezkel Sarna =

Israeli rabbi

- יחזקאל סרנה
- Yechezkel Sarna
- Born: 18 February 1890; Horodok, Russia
- Died: 20 August 1969 (aged 79); Jerusalem, Israel

Yechezkel Sarna (Hebrew: יחזקאל סרנה; 1890–1969) was a disciple of Nosson Tzvi Finkel, spiritual mentor of the Slabodka yeshiva. He was sent by Finkel to move the yeshiva from Europe to Hebron in 1925, and following the 1929 Hebron massacre, to Jerusalem. In 1934, he became rosh yeshiva (dean).

== Early years ==
Sarna was born in Horodok, Russia, on 28 Shevat in 1890. His father, Yaakov Chaim, was the city's shochet (kosher slaughterer) and melamed, (schoolteacher and later its maggid (preacher). Sarna's mother, Aidel, was the daughter of Shlomo Zalman Buxenbaum, a hassid of the Chiddushei Harim, and author of Rechovos Ir, a commentary on Midrash Rabba.

When he was 11 he was sent to the Ohr Hachaim yeshiva in Slabodka, headed by Tzvi Levitan, a student of l Simcha Zissel Ziv. In 1902, he went to Maltsch to study under the Chief Rabbi there, Zalman Sender Kahana-Shapiro. Later he returned to Slabodka to study under Chaim Rabinowitz in Knesses Beis Yitzchok.

In 1904 Sarna was one of the students who went with Rabinowitz when he moved to the Telz Yeshiva. When the yeshiva temporarily closed in 1906, Sarna returned to Maltsch, studying under Shimon Shkop. A year later he returned to Knesses Yisroel Yeshiva in Slabodka.

== World War I ==
With the outbreak of World War I, the entire Slabodka yeshiva fled to Minsk. Like all of the yeshiva's students, Sarna secured forged affidavits in order to avoid being drafted. He was caught and imprisoned, escaped, and fled to the home of a relative, Yehoshua Zimbalist. Soon after, he escaped to Smilowitz where the Chofetz Chaim and his students had taken refuge.

Shortly after the Slabodka yeshiva had arrived in Minsk, which was near the battlefront, it was forced to flee to a safer city, Kremenchuk. Sarna did not rejoin the yeshiva and remained in Smilowitz, studying for a year and a half in an inn with the students of the Raduń Yeshiva. During this period, he developed close relationships with the Chofetz Chaim and Raduń's rosh yeshiva, Naftoli Trop.

After the Russian Revolution of 1917 Sarna returned to the Knesses Yisroel yeshiva in Kremenchuk. Two years later he married Pesha Miriam Epstein, the daughter of Moshe Mordechai Epstein, one of the roshei yeshiva (deans).

Shortly after World War I the yeshiva left Russia and returned to Slabodka, which after the war was re-annexed to Lithuania. He held no official position in the yeshiva there.

== Palestine ==
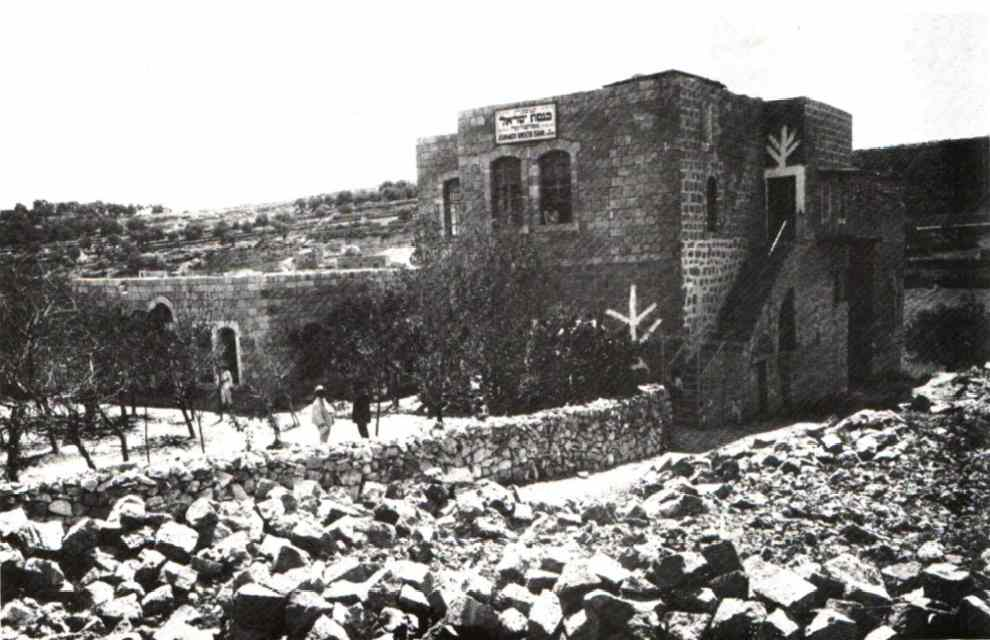
Knesses Yisrael yeshiva (Hebron)

In 1924, following the edict requiring enlistment in the military or supplementary secular studies in the yeshiva, the decision was made to transfer the yeshiva to Eretz Yisroel. Sarna was sent to Eretz Yisroel to choose a site for the yeshiva and to coordinate its establishment there. After evaluating various options he chose the city of Hebron. Consequently, Knesses Yisroel became the first Lithuanian yeshiva to transfer to Eretz Yisroel. At that period, Sarna assumed a significant role in the yeshiva's leadership, delivering shiurim (lectures) and coordinating study schedules. In the beginning of 1927, the Alter fell seriously ill, and Sarna began to deliver musar discourses in the yeshiva.

In the course of the 1929 Hebron massacre, 24 of the yeshiva's students had been killed and many were injured. Sarna succeeded in reestablishing the yeshiva in Jerusalem. He renamed it "Hebron", in memory of those who were massacred in that city. While Leib Chasman, the yeshiva's mashgiach, dedicated himself to encouraging the students, Sarna took the task of fund raising for the yeshiva, traveling extensively.

In a letter to Isaac Sher of Slabodka, he wrote, "The first weeks were very difficult, since the students were both destitute and despondent. But by the 15th of Elul, they returned to themselves, and by Rosh Hashana, the yeshiva began to function in full force."

When his father-in-law, Moshe Mordechai, died in 1933, four years after the Hebron Massacre, Rav Yechezkel was officially appointed rosh yeshiva of Hebron.

== Community involvement and leadership ==
Sarna was among the founders of the Vaad Yeshivos, and was also active in the Vaad Hatzalah. After the founding of the State of Israel, Sarna served as one of the leaders of the Chinuch Atzmai Torah School Network. He was a member of Agudas Yisroel's Council of Torah Sages.

In 1936, the yeshiva's mashgiach, Yehuda Leib Chasman died and Sarna replaced him.

== Death ==
In 1969, he was taken to Hadassah Ein Kerem Hospital for intensive treatment. He died on 6 Elul and was buried beside his father-in-law, Moshe Mordechai Epstein, on the Mount of Olives.

== Family ==
Sarna and his wife Pesha Miriam had one son, Chaim. and a daughter, Chana (married name Farbstein), who was born 1923

== Works ==
- Rearrangement of the Kuzari by Rav. Sarna, Transl. Rabbi Avraham Davis; Metsudah 1986
- Iyunim on Mesilat Yesharim available at http://hebrewbooks.org/41769
- Daliot Yechezkel
