= Hebron Yeshiva =

Slabodka Yeshiva branch in Hebron, and later in Jerusalem

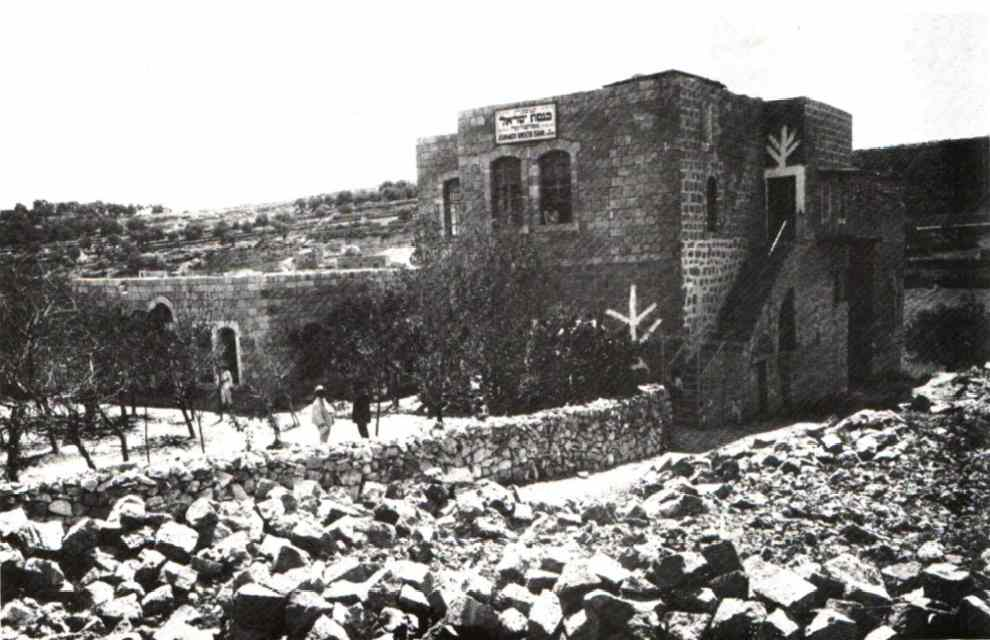
The Hebron Yeshiva, Knesses Yisrael (Hebron)

Hebron Yeshiva, also known as Yeshivas Hevron, or Knesses Yisroel, is a yeshiva (school for Talmudic study). It originated in 1924 when the roshei yeshiva (deans) and 150 students of the Slabodka Yeshiva, known colloquially as the "mother of yeshivas", relocated to Hebron.

== Relocation of Slabodka Yeshiva to Israel ==
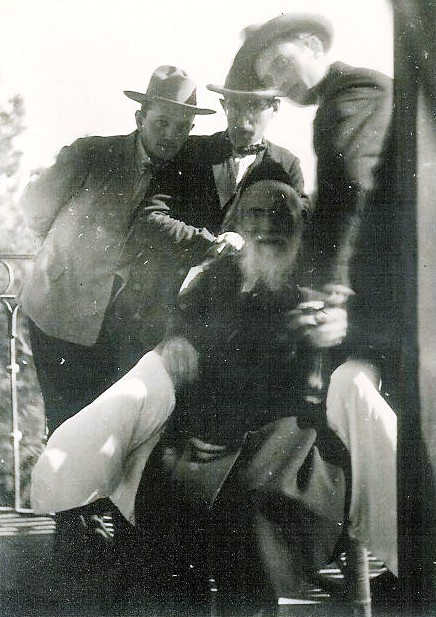
The Alter of Slabodka surrounded by students in Hebron.

A 1924 edict requiring enlistment in the military or supplementary secular studies in the yeshiva led a large number of students in the Slabodka yeshiva to relocate to the Land of Israel, at that time Palestine under the British mandate. Rabbi Nosson Tzvi Finkel, also known as "Der Alter fun Slabodka" (The Elder of Slabodka), sent Rabbi Avraham Grodzinski to head this group and establish the yeshiva in Hebron. Upon Grodzinski's return to Slabodka, the Alter transferred the mashgiach ruchani responsibilities to him, and the rosh yeshiva duties to Rabbi Yitzchok Isaac Sher, and he moved to Hebron to lead the yeshiva there together with Rabbi Moshe Mordechai Epstein. Hebron was chosen over Jerusalem to avoid the influence of the conservative Old Yishuv. The Slabodka yeshiva in Europe ceased operation during the Holocaust. A branch was also established in Bnei Brak.

== 1929 Hebron massacre and relocation to Jerusalem ==
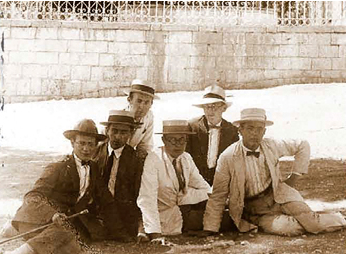
Hebron yeshiva students, circa 1920s. All but one of these students was murdered in the pogrom.

Twenty-four students were murdered in the 1929 Hebron massacre, and the yeshiva was re-established in the Geula neighbourhood of Jerusalem.

Eight of the victims were American citizens who had come to study in the yeshiva from American yeshivas such as Hebrew Theological College, Torah Vodaath and RIETS.

On the day of the 1929 massacre, Rabbi Simcha Zissel Broide, who was appointed Rosh Yeshiva in 5721 (1960/61), was not in Hebron.

The yeshiva moved into a new and larger campus in the south-central Givat Mordechai neighbourhood in 1975. It has about 1500 students and is one of the most prestigious and influential haredi non-hassidic yeshivahs in Israel. The current roshei yeshiva (deans) are rabbis Dovid Cohen and Yosef Chevroni.

== Prominent alumni ==
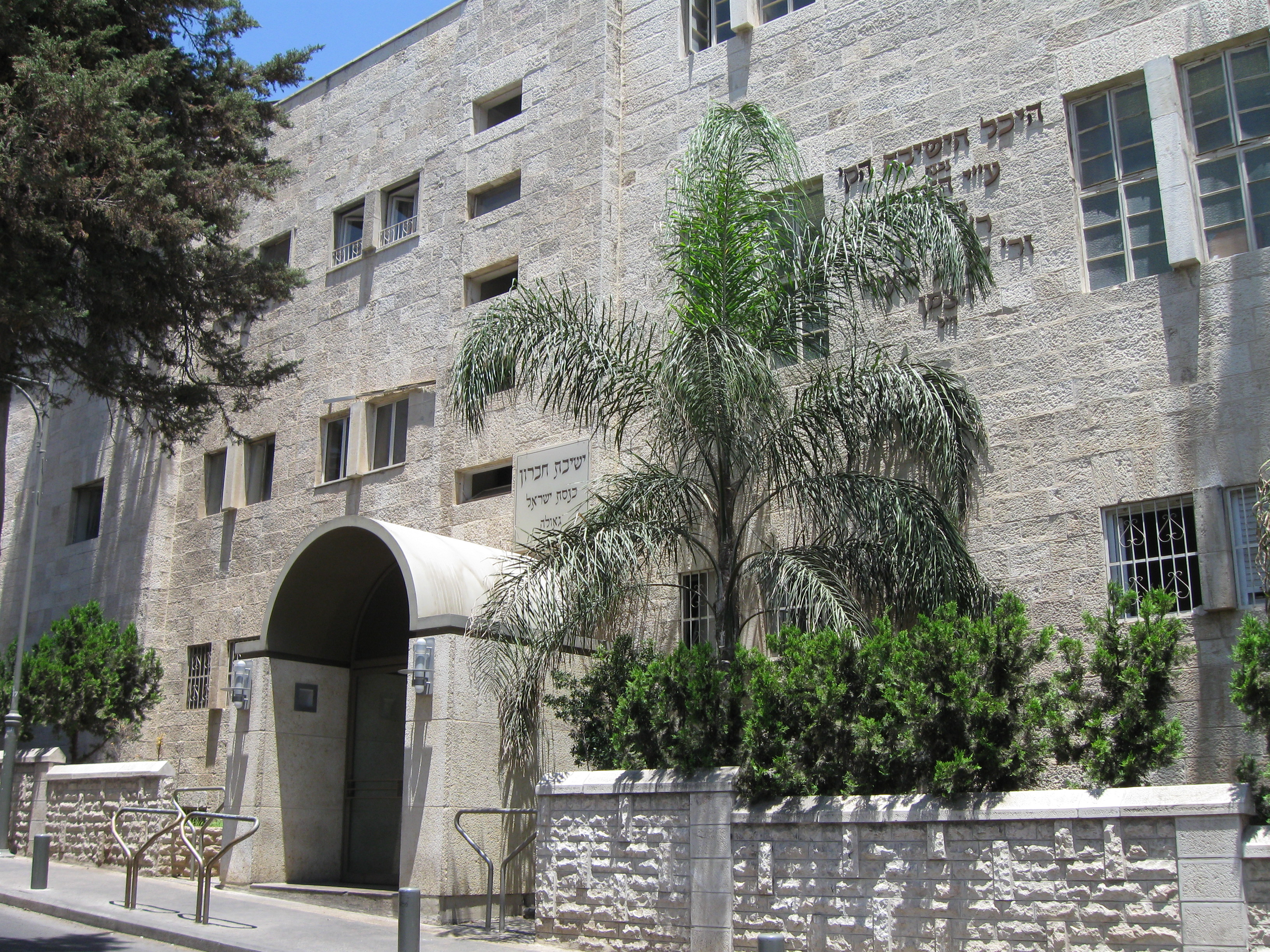
Geula branch of the Hebron yeshiva.

- Yitzchak Abadi, Rosh Kollel, Kollel Ohel Torah
- Yehuda Amital, rosh yeshiva, Yeshivat Har Etzion (Gush Etzion, West Bank)
- Ratzon Arusi
- Eliyahu Bakshi-Doron, Sepharadi Chief Rabbi of Israel
- Simcha Zissel Broide, Rosh Yeshiva
- Meir Chadash, Mashgiach
- Aryeh Deri, leader of Israeli Shas party
- Menachem Elon, the former Deputy Chief of Israeli Supreme Court
- Baruch Mordechai Ezrachi, rosh yeshiva, Yeshiva Ateres Yisrael, Jerusalem
- Zalman Nechemia Goldberg
- Shlomo Goren, Ashkenazi Chief Rabbi of Israel
- Rene Gutman, Chief Rabbi, Strasbourg, France
- Yeshayahu Hadari, rosh yeshiva, Yeshivat Hakotel (Jerusalem)
- Yitzchak Hutner, rosh yeshiva, Yeshiva Rabbi Chaim Berlin (Brooklyn, New York)
- Shneur Kotler, rosh yeshiva, Beth Medrash Govoha (Lakewood, New Jersey)
- Dov Landau, rosh yeshiva, Slabodka yeshiva (Bnei Brak)
- Michel Yehuda Lefkowitz
- Raphael Pelcovitz, Rabbi Emeritus of the White Shul
- Yitzhak Peretz, Chief Rabbi of Ra'anana
- Aharon Pfeuffer, Rosh Yeshiva in London and Johannesburg, and known for his series on Kashrut
- Sholom Schwadron, Haredi rabbi and maggid
- Dov Schwartzman, rosh yeshiva, Yeshivas Beis HaTalmud (Jerusalem)
- Avraham Shapira, rosh yeshiva, Mercaz HaRav (Jerusalem)
- Moshe Shapiro, rabbi, Rosh kollel, and Rosh yeshiva, Yeshivas Shev Shmatsa
- Moishe Sternbuch, vice-president of the Rabbinical Court and the Ra'avad of the Edah HaChareidis (Jerusalem)
- David Yosef, Sephardic Chief Rabbi of Israel
- Moshe Yosef
- Yitzhak Yosef, previous Sephardic Chief Rabbi of Israel
- Eliezer Waldenberg
- Betzalel Zolty
- Mordechai Breuer

== See also ==
- 1929 Hebron massacre
- Kovno Kollel
- Slabodka yeshiva (Bnei Brak)
- Yeshivas Knesses Yisrael (Slabodka)
