= Avraham Grodzinski =

Polish Rabbi

Avraham Grodzinski (c. 1884 - July 13, 1944) was a rabbi who served as the mashgiach ruchani (spiritual supervisor) of the Slabodka yeshiva in Lithuania. He is best known for being the primary disciple of Nosson Tzvi Finkel, the Alter of Slabodka", and for his book of mussar (ethics) lectures called Toras Avraham.

== Early life ==
Grodzinski was born in 1883 in Warsaw to parents of Lithuanian Jewish descent. His grandfather, Zev Grodzinski, emigrated from Lithuania to Warsaw, and his father, Yitzchak (Itcheh) was one of the leaders of the Warsaw Jewish community. Itcheh established and supported a yeshiva in Warsaw, regarding which the Chofetz Chaim commented "Reb Itcheh saved Jewish education in Warsaw". His home was dedicated solely to the dissemination of Torah and chesed (lovingkindness); tens of poor people partook in meals on a daily basis. Grodzinski once quipped, "From a young age, I was so busy assisting and catering to all the guests and helping my father in all his chesed activities, I did not have a childhood". Itcheh was very close to the great Torah leaders of his time, many of whom frequented his home when visiting Warsaw. The Beis Halevi asked Itcheh to accompany him to Brisk to accept the helm of the rabbinate there.

== Slabodka and the Alter ==
After short stints studying Torah in Yeshivas Radin and Łomża, in 1899 Grodzinski enrolled in the Slabodka yeshiva in Lithuania, which was under the leadership of Nosson Tzvi Finkel. Under the auspices of Finkel, known as the 'Alter of Slabodka', Grodzinski began years of toil in Torah and self-perfection. Although few details from those years are known, the little that is known gives a picture of his character and the methods he used to further his development. He spent two years perfecting the attribute of "greeting every individual with a pleasant facial countenance". People would later attest to the extent of which he inculcated this precept into his character; even in the most horrific times in the Kovno Ghetto during the Holocaust, his pleasant facial expression masked his internal grief. Grodzinski's work on character development never interfered with his intense Talmudic study.

During his tenure in Slabodka, Grodzinski forged a deep and close relationship with the Alter. He immersed himself in his mentor's teachings, mastering them all and internalizing them. The Alter, in turn, pointed to him as "my portion in all my efforts." His relationship with the Alter was fundamental to his own personal growth, and years later, when he accepted the mantle of leadership in the Slabodka yeshiva, the presence of the Alter never left his consciousness.

== Death ==
In 1944, Grodzinski was burned alive when the Kovna hospital he was confined to was set ablaze. Of his eight children, four were murdered in the Holocaust and four survived.

== Works ==
- Torat Avraham
