= Nosson Tzvi Finkel (Slabodka) =

Lithuanian rabbi, founder of the Slabodka yeshiva (1849–1927)

Rabbi Nosson Tzvi Finkel
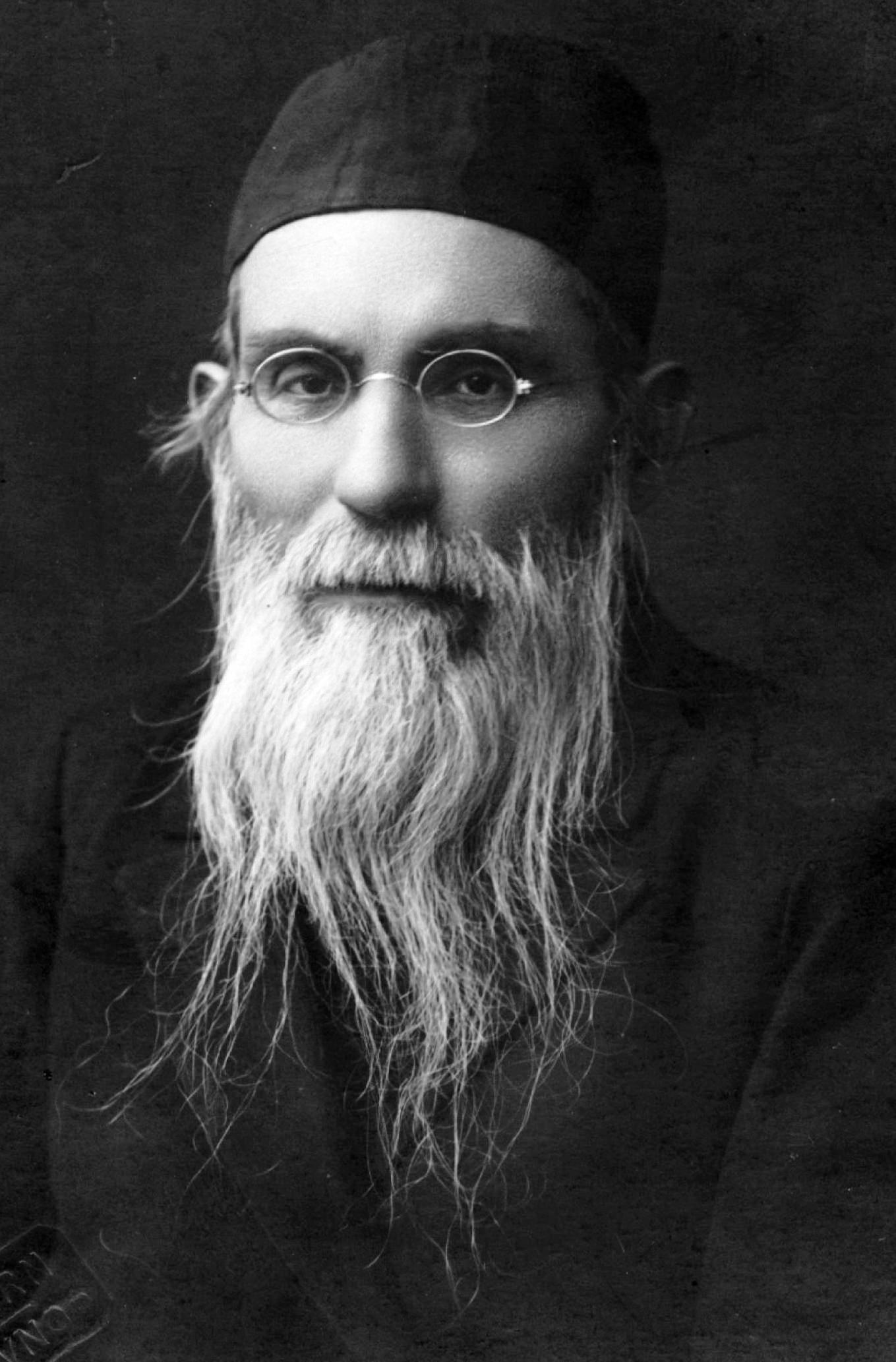

Personal life
- Born: 1849 Raseiniai, Raseiniai County, Kovno Governorate, Russian Empire (present-day Lithuania)
- Died: February 1, 1927 (aged 77–78) Jerusalem
- Buried: Har Hazeisim
- Spouse: Gittel
- Parents: Moshe (father); Miriam (mother)
- Education: Kelm Talmud Torah

Religious life
- Religion: Judaism
- Denomination: Orthodox Judaism

Jewish leader
- Position: Founder
- Yeshiva: Slabodka Yeshiva; Chevron Yeshiva
- Began: 1882
- Ended: 1927
- Yahrtzeit: 29 Shevat 5687

Nosson Tzvi Finkel (Hebrew: נתן צבי פינקל, Sephardic/Israeli: Natan Tzvi; Yiddish: נָטע הערש, romanized: Nota Hirsch; 1849–1927) was an influential Lithuanian Jewish leader of Orthodox Judaism in Eastern Europe and founder of the Slabodka yeshiva, in the town of Sloboda Vilyampolskaya (now called Vilijampolė, a suburb of Kaunas). He is also known by the Yiddish appellation der Alter ("the Elder") and as the Alter of Slabodka. Many of his pupils were to become major leaders of Orthodox Judaism in the USA and Israel.

== Early years ==
Rabbi Finkel was born in 1849 to Reb Moshe Finkel and was orphaned at an early age, not much is known about his formative years. At a young age, he went to study at the Kelm Talmud Torah under Rabbi Simcha Zissel Ziv, "the Alter of Kelm."

== Philosophical approach ==
Despite his influence, he was an intensely private person. Yet, he personally oversaw the complete student body of the yeshiva.

His motto was summed up in the words Gadlus HaAdam ("Greatness of Man"). He stressed the need for mussar (ethics), using works such as those of Rabbi Moshe Chaim Luzzatto, polishing the character traits of his students so that they would aspire to become gedolim - "great ones" in all areas of both scholarship, and personal ethics.

He spent ten out of every twelve months with his students full-time, only returning to his wife for the Jewish holidays. He had special agents who would keep an eye out all over Europe for teenagers with an aptitude for both scholarship and leadership, recruiting them and bringing them back to Slobodka. He attained unusual success, and his students subsequently reflected that he was a master of the human psyche and knew just which psychological buttons to press to give direction to his students' lives.

He would monitor the extracurricular behavior of students, judging their character faults and strengths. He was responsible for deciding which boys would share rooms together, weighing the strengths of one against the other. Some were chosen to be his personal assistants. He stressed the importance of outer appearance and the need for neatness and cleanliness. He did not want the image of the poor, tattered, down-trodden yeshiva bochur (yeshiva student) to be associated with the alumni of his institution. The rabbinical and Talmudical graduates of the Slobodka Yeshiva tried to live up to a higher code of dress and deportment, to the point of being accused of being dandies.

He would send teams of his trained prized pupils to places that needed a boost in religious observance and learning of Torah. His own son, Eliezer Yehudah (Leizer Yudel) Finkel eventually became the head of the far older Mir yeshiva, eventually leading it all the way to Jerusalem where it is today the largest post-high school yeshiva in the world with thousands of students.

== Opposition ==
His main opponents in the "yeshiva world" were first and foremost Rabbi Chaim Soloveitchik and as a result the Brisk yeshivas, who were adamantly opposed to any changes in what they believed to be the time-tested ways of yeshiva education. To this day, the Brisk yeshivos, based mainly in Jerusalem today, do not teach mussar (ethics) as a separate curriculum, but focus on pure Talmud study.

Finkel's opponents argued that the pure focus on the Talmud would automatically create greatness in both scholarship and ethics. But Finkel believed that, while this might have been true in previous generations, the modern age was different. In his view, too many new enticing secular ideologies, such as Socialism and Zionism and the very real lure of atheism in universities, were becoming a replacement for traditional Judaism for many young Jews. He was determined to prove that what he had to offer was more appealing than anything the outside world could offer.

== Land of Israel ==
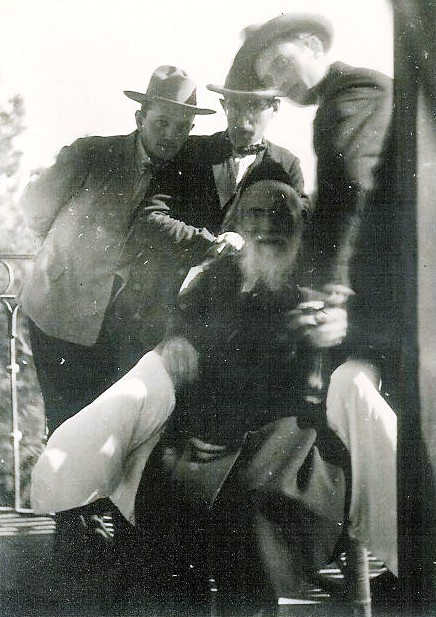
Rabbi Nosson Tzvi Finkel, tended by his yeshiva students, in the British Mandate of Palestine in his last years.

Finkel staged one of the most dramatic moves in the history of yeshivos. In the 1920s he decided to create a branch of his yeshiva in the Land of Israel, together with the dean Rabbi Moshe Mordechai Epstein, setting it up in Hebron and sending waves of hand-picked students there, culminating with his own permanent aliyah, "going up", to the Holy Land two years before his passing.

In the region of Palestine he founded his own institution in the town of Hebron called Knesses Yisroel - "Gathering of Israel", which moved to Jerusalem following the massacre of Jews during the 1929 Palestine riots in which many of the yeshiva students were murdered. This yeshiva today, Yeshivas Chevron in Jerusalem, has about a thousand students and is one of the most prestigious Lithuanian yeshivos in Israel.

== Influence ==
During his lifetime, he molded many who would eventually become the heads (roshei yeshiva) of most of the so-called Lithuanian-style yeshivas that were established in the United States and Israel during the 20th century, and which continue to grow dramatically in the 21st century. Some of the more famous students are:

- Rabbi Eliezer Yehuda Finkel (son of the Alter) of the Mirrer Yeshiva in Mir and Jerusalem, Israel
- Rabbi Yitzchok Hutner of Yeshiva Rabbi Chaim Berlin of Brooklyn, New York
- Rabbi Yaakov Kamenetsky of Yeshiva Torah Vodaas in Brooklyn, New York
- Rabbi Avrohom Eliyahu Kaplan of Hildesheimer Rabbinical Seminary in Berlin, Germany
- Rabbi Aharon Kotler, of Beth Medrash Govoha in Lakewood, New Jersey
- Rabbi Dovid Leibowitz of Yeshiva Chofetz Chaim: Rabbinical Seminary of America in Queens
- Rabbi Yaakov Yitzchok Ruderman of Yeshivas Ner Yisroel in Baltimore, Maryland
- Rabbi Yechezkel Sarna, head of Chevron Yeshiva, Jerusalem, Israel
- Rabbi Isaac Sher, head of the Slabodka Yeshiva of Bnei Brak, Israel
- Rabbi Yechiel Yaakov Weinberg of Hildesheimer Rabbinical Seminary in Berlin, Germany
- Professor Harry Austryn Wolfson of Harvard University

The Alter did not author any books or essays personally, but some of his ethical discourses were published under the name Ohr HaTzafun - "The Hidden Light" (also meaning "The Light of the Hidden (One)"). The word Ha-Tz[a]-F[u]-N also being the four initials of his name, but not in order ("Hirsh-Tzvi-Finkel-Nota"). The title alludes to the hidden and mysterious nature of its subject, as he used to sign his name as Hatzafun.
