= Moshe Mordechai Epstein =

Lithuanian rabbi (1866–1933)

- משה מרדכי עפשטיין
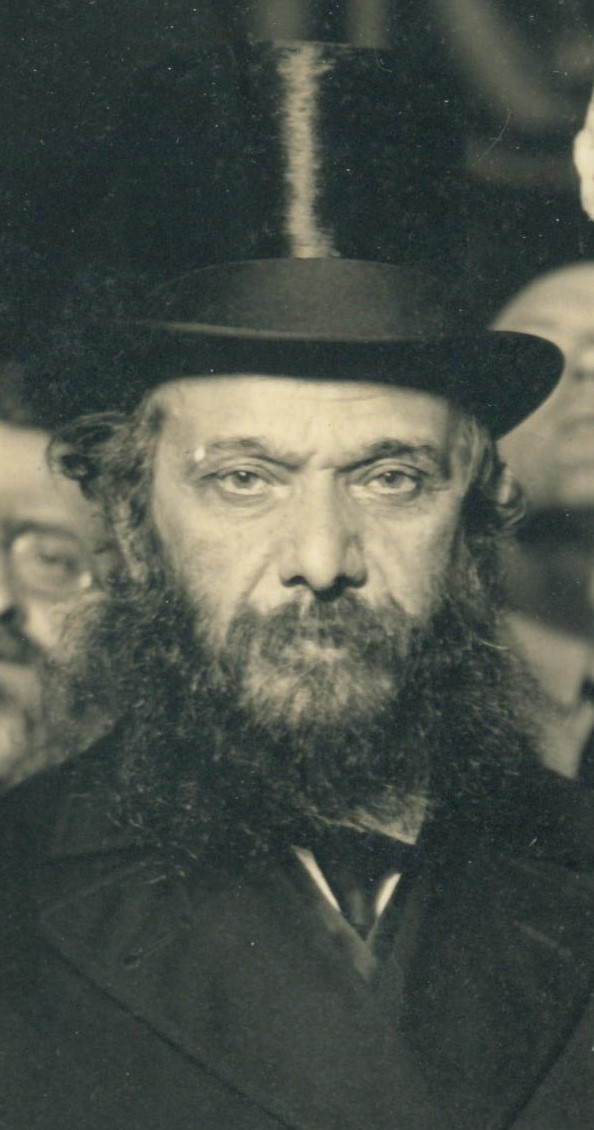
- Epstein in 1924

Personal life
- Born: 7 March 1866 Bakšty, Russian Empire (now Belarus)
- Died: 28 November 1933 (aged 67) Jerusalem, Mandatory Palestine
- Buried: Mount of Olives, Jerusalem
- Spouse: Menucha Frank
- Parent(s): Tzvi Chaim and Baila Chana Epstein
- Education: Volozhin yeshiva

Religious life
- Religion: Judaism
- Denomination: Orthodox Judaism

Jewish leader
- Yeshiva: Yeshivas Knesses Yisrael; Hebron Yeshiva
- Yahrtzeit: 10 Kislev 5694

Moshe Mordechai Epstein (Yiddish: משה מרדכי עפשטיין, romanized: Moishe Mordechay Epshteyn; 7 March 1866 – 28 November 1933) was rosh yeshiva of Yeshiva Knesseth Yisrael in Slabodka, Lithuania and is recognized as having been one of the leading Talmudists of the twentieth century. He is also one of the founders of the city of Hadera.

== Childhood ==
Epstein was born in Bakšty, then in Vilensky Uezd of the Russian Empire (now in Grodno Region, Belarus), on 7 March 1866 (20 Adar 5626 according to the Hebrew calendar) to rabbi Tzvi Chaim and Baila Chana Epstein. His father, who served as the rabbi of Bakst, had been affectionately referred to during his days in the Volozhin yeshiva as "the Bakst Genius". Moshe Mordechai's genius was detected from a very early age and he was called the illui from Bakst. The child prodigy began studying in the Volozhin yeshiva at the age of 16, under the guidance of the legendary Torah giant rabbi Chaim Soloveitchik. There, he met his brother-in-law-to-be, Rabbi Isser Zalman Meltzer, and, in 1889, married Menucha Frank, the eldest "Frank sister".

== Leadership ==
After his marriage, Epstein moved to his wife's hometown, in Kovno, and was joined there two years later by Rabbi Meltzer, following his marriage to Epstein's sister-in-law, Baila Hinda Frank. In Kovno, the two scholars studied under the renowned mussar master, Rabbi Yitzchak Blazer, known in yeshivos as "Reb Itzele Peterburger", one of Rabbi Yisrael Salanter's foremost disciples. It was there that they became intrigued with the study of mussar.

In 1894, both rabbis started teaching in the famed Slabodka yeshiva, which was not far from Kovno. In 1897, Nosson Tzvi Finkel, Slabodka's famed mashgiach ruchani), invited Epstein to become the rosh yeshiva. Epstein accepted the post, while Meltzer moved together with some of his best talmidim to the town of Slutsk to lead the Ridvaz's yeshiva there. The Slabodka yeshiva flourished under the joint leadership of Rabbis Epstein and Finkel, and many of its students were crucial in nurturing the spiritual level of the Jewish people in subsequent generations.

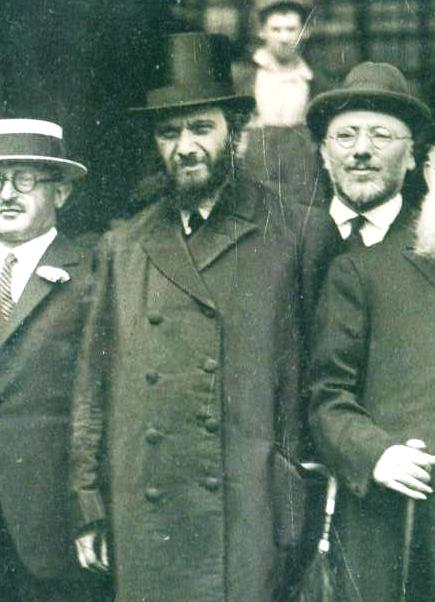
Epstein during a trip to the United States and Canada

In 1924, Epstein was part of a delegation to the United States headed by Rabbi Abraham Isaac Kook, chief rabbi of the Land of Israel.

In 1924, Epstein, Finkel, and most of the yeshiva, relocated to Hebron, in what was then British Mandate for Palestine. The yeshiva thrived for five years in Hebron as it had in Lithuania. In late August 1929 mobs, incited by the grand mufti Mohammad Amin al-Husayni, swarmed the yeshiva, killing over 67 Jews and wounding many more, in an event known as the 1929 Hebron massacre. Among the victims was his American-born nephew Aaron David Epstein. In the aftermath, the British authorities evacuated the rest of the Jewish community. The yeshiva was relocated to the Geula section of Jerusalem, and was renamed Yeshivas Chevron. In 1975, Yeshivas Chevron moved to its current location in Givat Mordechai.

== Legacy ==
Epstein was known to share a warm relationship with Finkel. Epstein's daughter married Finkel's son, Moshe Finkel. Epstein's other daughter married Yechezkel Sarna (1895–1969), who succeeded Epstein as rosh yeshiva of Chevron after his death. Epstein had only one son, Chaim Shraga Feivel, whom he named after his father-in-law. Epstein authored the Levush Mordechai (1901), which contains his chiddushim, or novellae, on all tractates of the Talmud.

His brother, Rabbi Ephraim Epstein (1876–1960) also studied at the Slabodka yeshiva, and later moved to the United States where he served as rabbi to Congregation Anshei Kneseth in Chicago for over 50 years. Rabbi Ephraim Epstein's son, Rabbi Harry Epstein, headed Ahavath Achim Congregation in Atlanta Georgia for over 50 years and founded what is now called the Epstein School.

Epstein died in Jerusalem in 1933 (10 Kislev 5694). He is buried on the Mount of Olives.

A street in the Neve Haim neighborhood in Hadera is named after him, and a street in the Geula neighborhood of Jerusalem is named after his book "Levush Mordechai"
