= Biedermann =

Biedermann is German for an honourable, upright man. Notable people with this surname include:

- Christoph Biedermann (born 1987), Liechtenstein footballer
- Edwin Biedermann (1877–1929), British real tennis player
- Friedrich Karl Biedermann (1812–1901), German political philosopher
- Gisela Biedermann (born 1948), Liechtensteiner physician and politician
- Harry Biedermann (1887–1917), first-class cricketer
- Jeanette Biedermann (born 1980), German singer, actress and television personality
- Johann Jakob Biedermann (1763–1830), Swiss painter and etcher
- Josy Biedermann (born 1948), Liechtenstein businesswoman and politician
- Julia Biedermann (born 1967), German television actress
- Karl Biedermann (1890–1945), Austrian military officer
- Kyle Biedermann, American politician
- Manfred Biedermann (1952–2017), Liechtenstein teacher and politician
- Marc Biedermann, American musician for heavy metal band Blind Illusion
- Paul Biedermann (born 1986), German swimmer
- Jacob Jizchak Biderman (born 1957), Israeli rabbi, the chief Chabad emissary in Vienna, Austria

== See also ==
- Der Biedermann, a moralistic weekly from 1727 to 1729 by Johann Christoph Gottsched
- Biedermann und die Brandstifter, a 1953 play by Max Frisch, published in English as The Fire Raisers or The Arsonists
- Biedermann Museum, a museum in Donaueschingen, Germany
- Biedermann (band), a rock band from Fürstenfeld in Styria, Austria
- Biederman, a surname
- Biderman, another surname
