= Amram Zaks =

Israeli rabbi (1926–2012)

Rabbi Amram Yitzchak Zaks עמרם יצחק זקס
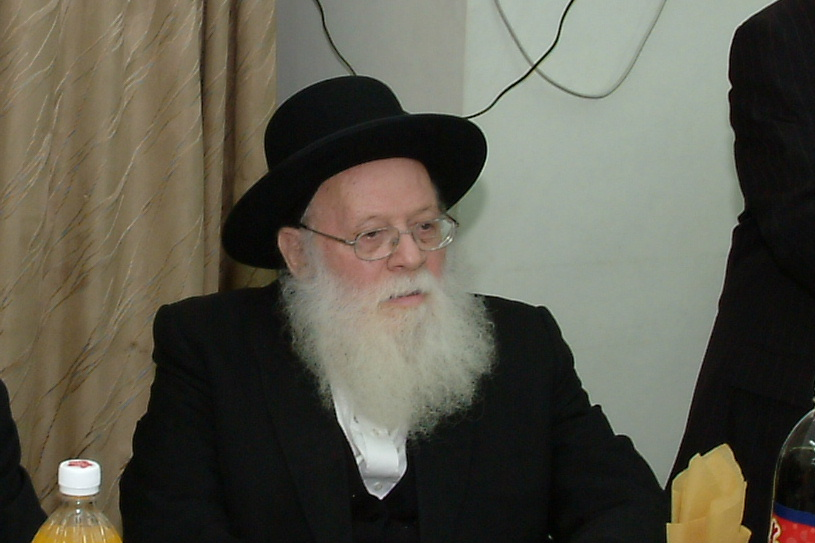

Personal life
- Born: October 30, 1926 Jerusalem
- Died: December 30, 2012 (aged 86)
- Children: Simchah Shmuel Zaks
- Parents: Chaim Eliyahu Zalman Zaks (father); Esther Leah Friedman (mother)

Religious life
- Religion: Judaism
- Yeshiva: Slabodka yeshiva (Bnei Brak)
- Position: Rosh yeshiva
- Yahrtzeit: 20 Kislev, 5773

Rabbi Amram Yitzchak Zaks (Hebrew: עמרם יצחק זקס; 1926—2012) served as the rosh yeshiva of the Slabodka yeshiva of Bnei Brak, Israel alongside Rabbis Dov Landau and Moshe Hillel Hirsch.

== Biography ==
Rabbi Zaks was born on October 30, 1926, in Jerusalem to Rabbi Chaim Eliyahu Zalman and Esther Leah Zaks. His mother was the daughter of Rabbi Mordechai Friedman and the sister of Rabbi Mendel Friedman, son-in-law of Rabbi Yosef Chaim Sonnenfeld.

Rabbi Zaks was a student of Rabbi Isser Zalman Meltzer in Etz Chaim Yeshiva. In 1947, he traveled to Bnei Brak where he studied at the Slabodka yeshiva under Rabbi Isaac Sher. In 1952 he was engaged to be married with Rabbi Sher's eldest granddaughter, the daughter of his son-in-law, Rabbi Mordechai Shulman, rosh yeshiva of Slabodka. The wedding took place in March 1952, shortly after the death of Rabbi Sher (who died in February 1952). Several years after his marriage, his father-in-law appointed him to deliver shiurim at Slabodka.

More than 20 years before Rabbi Amram died, he suffered a stroke from which he never fully recovered.

Rabbi Zaks died on December 30, 2012. Tens of thousands attended his funeral, where he was eulogized by Rabbis Landau and Hirsch of the Slabodka yeshiva as well as by the Rebbe of Sanz, by Rabbi Baruch Dov Povarsky, by Rabbi Yitzchok Zilberstein (a student of Rabbi Amram), and by Rabbi Amram's son, Rabbi Simchah Shmuel Zaks.
