= Jacob Jizchak Biderman =

Chabad rabbi and community leader in Vienna

Jacob Isaac Biderman
- יעקב יצחק בידרמן
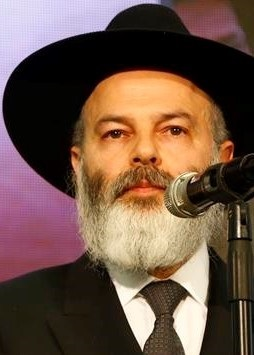
- Biderman in 2016
- Born: 1957 (age 68–69); Jerusalem
- Occupations: Rabbi; Chabad emissary; educator
- Organization: Chabad
- Known for: Founding Jewish educational and community institutions in Vienna

Jacob Isaac Biderman (Hebrew: יעקב יצחק בידרמן; born 1957 in Jerusalem) is an Israeli rabbi, the chief Chabad emissary in Vienna, Austria, since 1981, a member of the European Jewish Rabbinical Council, and a lecturer in Jewish philosophy. He founded numerous Jewish educational and communal institutions, synagogues and community centers, including the Lauder Business School, a private university in Vienna, where he serves as vice president.

== Life ==
=== Early life and education ===
Biderman was born in Jerusalem to Rabbi David Zvi Israel, son of the Lelover Rebbe Moshe Mordechai Biderman, and Esther Chana, daughter of philanthropist Abraham Pershan of Toronto. He attended the Moriah elementary school in Tel Aviv and later studied at the Chabad high school in Montreal (until 1974).

From 1975 to 1978 he studied at the Tomchei Tmimim yeshiva in Brunoy, France, and at the Chabad center in New York City, where he received his rabbinical ordination. He also received ordination from the Union of Orthodox Rabbis of the United States and Canada under the leadership of Moshe Feinstein. In 1979 he was part of the founding group of the Or Elchonon – Chabad yeshiva in Los Angeles.

=== Work in Vienna ===
In 1980 he married Adela, daughter of Rabbi Jissachar Dow Halevi Gurwitz, a leading Chabad teacher in France. At the direct instruction of the Lubavitcher Rebbe, he moved to Vienna in 1981 to establish Chabad activities there.

He established kindergartens, after-school programs and summer camps for the Jewish community. In the 1980s he focused particularly on Jewish immigrants from Bukhara, Georgia and the Caucasus, helping them to establish their own congregations. In 1986 he founded the Chabad synagogue "Heichal Menachem" in Vienna's 9th district, where he served as rabbi until 2022. In 1989 the "Sephardic Center" was opened with two synagogues, an events hall and a youth club.

In 1992 the "Olam Chadasch" kindergarten was established in the Prater. In the 1980s and 1990s he founded an elementary and middle school, followed in 2000 by a high school. These institutions were later consolidated into the "Lauder Chabad Campus" in the Augarten, funded by donations from Ronald S. Lauder. At the cornerstone ceremony in 1999, representatives of the Austrian government and then-Israeli Prime Minister Benjamin Netanyahu were present.

In 2006 he initiated the community center "Beit Halevi – Chabad" in Vienna, named after Lev Leviev. In 2010 he became vice president of the Lauder Foundation for educational affairs. In 2011 he received the Max Fisher Prize of the Pincus Fund for his pioneering work in Jewish education. In 2012 he founded another kindergarten and a Talmud Torah school in Vienna's 19th district, supported by Martin Schlaff. In 2013 another Chabad center was opened in the 2nd district.

Under his leadership, 24 additional Chabad emissary couples came to Austria; he was also involved in sending Chabad emissaries to Salzburg, Munich, Frankfurt am Main and Budapest. He published numerous Jewish books and articles in German.

=== Academic career ===
In 1985 Biderman earned a doctorate in philosophy with a dissertation on the sources of Baruch Spinoza in Hasdai Crescas and parallel trends in Kabbalah and Hasidism. In 2001 he founded, in cooperation with the ministries of education of Austria and Israel, the "Academy for the Training of Jewish Teachers". In 2002 he received the title of professor and became rector.

In 2003 he initiated, with the support of the Lauder Foundation, the establishment of the Lauder Business School in Vienna, offering bachelor's and master's degrees in business administration with a Jewish curriculum. Ronald S. Lauder serves as president of the school, with Biderman as vice president. The campus is located in the former palace of Archduchess Maria Theresa in the 19th district.

=== Family ===
His son Rabbi Abraham leads a Chabad synagogue in Vienna's 2nd district. His son Rabbi Moshe Mordechai is a teacher at the Tomchei Tmimim yeshiva in Vienna. His daughter Musia is married to Rabbi Mordechai Segal, head of the central Chabad House in Vienna. His daughter Mina is married to Rabbi Jechiel Michel Butman, head of Judaism-TV and Chabad children's programs. His daughter Nechama is married to Rabbi Israel Wolosow, director of the Lauder Chabad school and the "Zeveta" youth movement in Vienna.
