= Eliyahu Boruch Finkel =

Rabbi Eliyahu Boruch Finkel אליהו ברוך פינקל
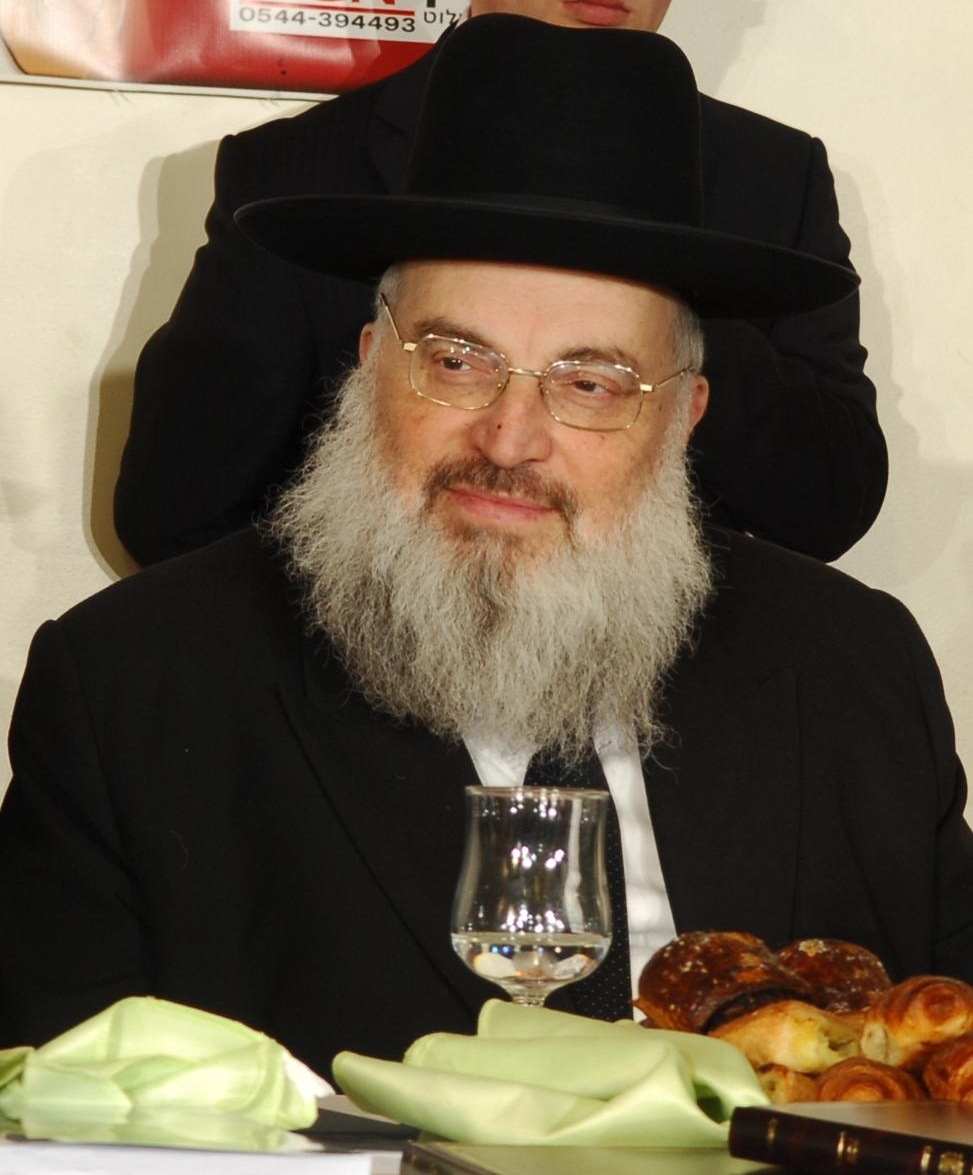

Personal life
- Born: Eliyahu Boruch Finkel; 25 December 1947 Jerusalem
- Died: March 31, 2008 (aged 60) Jerusalem
- Spouse: Chana Gelman
- Parent(s): Rabbi Moshe Finkel; Nechama Eidel Levin

Religious life
- Religion: Judaism
- Denomination: Haredi
- Yeshiva: Mir yeshiva (Jerusalem)
- Position: Rosh Yeshiva
- Ended: 2008

Eliyahu Boruch Finkel (Hebrew: אליהו ברוך פינקל; 25 December 1947 – March 31, 2008) was an influential maggid shiur (lecturer) at the Mir yeshiva in Jerusalem.

== Biography ==
He was born in Jerusalem, Israel to Rabbi Moshe Finkel, son of the rosh yeshiva of the Mir, Rabbi Eliezer Yehuda Finkel, and grandson of Rabbi Nosson Tzvi Finkel, the Alter of Slabodka. His mother was Nechama Eidel Levin, daughter of Rabbi Mordechai Dovid Levin, rosh yeshiva of Yeshivas Eitz Chaim).

He grew up under the tutelage of his grandfather, Rabbi Eliezer Yehuda, and studied in Talmud Torah Yavneh whose principal, Rav Korlansky was his uncle through marriage (married to his mother's sister). At the age of 10 he went to learn in Yeshivas Tiferes Tzvi, a school named after his grandfather Rabbi Nosson Tzvi Finkel. Half a year after his bar mitzvah, he moved to the Mir yeshiva and learned in chavrusa (study partner) with Rabbi Chaim Kamil, where he was recognized as an outstanding student.

While learning at the Mir, he became close with Rabbi Chaim Shmuelevitz and Rabbi Nochum Partzovitz. He would learn with Rabbi Partovitz every day for a few hours, covering all the sugyos of Shas, even those topics not studied regularly in yeshivas. Because of all the years that they learned together, Rabbi Eliyahu Boruch considered Rabbi Partzovitz his rebbe muvhak (chief teacher).

In recognition of Finkel's tremendous abilities, the roshei yeshiva appointed him to be a maggid shiur at a young age.

In the summer of 1967 he went to learn in the Ponevezh Yeshiva, where he learned in chavrusa with Rabbi Mordechai Shlomo Berman, one of the roshei yeshivas. He also learned with Ponevezh rosh yeshiva Rabbi Shmuel Rozovsky, who said about Eliyahu Boruch: "There was Rabbi Eliyahu Boruch Kamai (grandfather of Rabbi Eliyahu Boruch Finkel; Kamai means "first" in Aramaic), and now we have Rabbi Eliyahu Boruch Basrai (Aramaic for "last")".

After his tenure in Ponevezh, he returned to the Mir until his marriage to Chana Gelman, daughter of Rabbi Shlomo Gelman of Queens, New York.

== Maggid shiur ==
His shiurim were characterized by profundity on the one hand and clarity on the other, even in the most complicated sugyos. He would analyze the words of the Rishonim intently and give over his shiur with excitement.

Before his death, Finkel was delivering the second-largest shiur in the Mir, teaching hundreds of students.

Finkel died suddenly on 31 March 2008. His funeral took place the following morning in the main building of the yeshiva. Tens of thousands of mourners accompanied his bier to Har HaMenuchos, where he was buried in the new area for rabbis.
