= List of Alpha Epsilon Pi chapters =

Alpha Epsilon Pi is a college fraternity founded at New York University in 1913. Although the fraternity is based upon Jewish principles, it is open to all who are willing to espouse its purpose and values regardless of their particular faith tradition. It absorbed the Jewish fraternities Sigma Omega Psi in 1940 and Sigma Tau Phi in 1947.

== Naming Convention ==
Naming convention has varied significantly over time and in different parts of the United States, or other countries where the fraternity is present. At first, chapters were named with one Greek letter, in order of founding (NYU is Alpha, Cornell is Beta, and so on until the Greek Alphabet ends with the Omega chapter at UNC Chapel Hill). After this, the process started again, but adding Deuteron after the first letter (starting with Alpha Deuteron at Drake University, and ending with Omega Deuteron in the University of Michigan). Once the letter-Deuteron model was over, naming models became widely inconsistent. In many schools, the chapter designation is based on the School name and location (like Beta Iota for Indiana University Bloomington, or Mu Tau for MIT). In some regions, certain models have been followed. For example, chapters in Florida are named after the state (starting with Phi for Florida), and adding a second letter for either the city or town the university is in (like Phi Tau in FSU for Tallahassee, Phi Gamma in UF for Gainesville, etc...) or the name of the school (Phi Nu for Nova Southeastern, Phi Iota for FIU). This convention, however, is not universal. Chapters like USF, University of Miami, and UCF do not follow this trend.

In Israel, chapters have been named using the Hebrew alphabet. As of 2025, two chapters are Active: the Aleph (Israel Alpha) Chapter in Reichman University, and the Gimel (Israel Gamma) Chapter in Technion.

== Undergraduate chapters ==
In the following list, active chapters are indicated in bold and inactive chapters and institutions are in italics.

Chapter	Charter date and range	Institution	Location	Status	Ref.
**Alpha**	1913	New York University	New York, New York	Active	(Note: Chapter absorbed Chi Sigma Kappa and Sigma Omega Psi. It was suspended by the university but is still recognized by the national fraternity.)
**Beta**	1917–1976, 1979–2024	Cornell University	Ithaca, New York	Active	(Note: Chapter formed from Phi Tau Beta, established in 1916. Later, it absorbed Phi Sigma Delta.)
**Gamma**	1919–19xx ?, 1981–2012, 2017	University of Pennsylvania	Philadelphia, Pennsylvania	Active	(Note: Chapter absorbed Psi Phi and Sigma Tau Phi.)
**Delta**	1920	University of Illinois at Urbana–Champaign	Champaign, Illinois	Active	(Note: Chapter formed from Epsilon, established in 1919.)
**Epsilon**	1920–1994, 2014–2019, 2023	Emory University	Atlanta, Georgia	Active	
**Zeta**	1920–1923, 1946	Georgia Tech	Atlanta, Georgia	Active	(Note: After going dormant, the chapter was reformed in 1946 by absorbing the Sigma Gamma (local), established in 1936.)
**Eta**	1921–1924, 1928–1971, 1976–1999, 2001	Ohio State University	Columbus, Ohio	Active	
**Theta**	1921–1927, 1969–1984, 2021	Auburn University	Auburn, Alabama	Active	
**Iota**	1923–1932, 1952–1973, 1991	Columbia University	Manhattan, New York	Active	
Kappa	1924–1981	Ohio Northern University	Ada, Ohio	Inactive	(Note: Chapter formed from Phi Epsilon Rho, established in 1921.)
**Lambda (First)** (see Lambda Alpha)	1924–1932, 2006	University of Chicago	Chicago, Illinois	Active	(Note: Chapter was originally called Lambda but that name was reassigned after the chapter went inactive. Because the name was in use at the time at the time of its reestablishment, the chapter was dubbed Lambda Alpha. The name Lambda was restored in 2006 when Lambda (Second) went inactive.) (Note: Chapter absorbed Tau Sigma Omicron.)
**Mu**	November 29, 1924 – 2008; 2014	University of Virginia	Charlottesville, Virginia	Active	
Nu	1925–1974	Marquette University	Milwaukee, Wisconsin	Inactive	(Note: Chapter formed from Sigma Alpha, established in 1915.)
**Omicron**	1926	University of Georgia	Athens, Georgia	Active	(Note: Chapter formed from Pi Alpha, established in 1925.)
**Pi**	1927–1973, 1982	University of Wisconsin–Madison	Madison, Wisconsin	Active	(Note: Chapter formed from Tau Sigma Omicron, established in 1924.)
**Rho**	1928–1971, 1978–200x ?, 2014	University of Rhode Island	Kingston, Rhode Island	Active	(Note: Chapter formed from Beta Nu Epsilon, established in 1923.)
**Sigma**	1928–1939, 1946–1969, 1981	Washington University in St. Louis	St. Louis, Missouri	Active	(Note: Chapter formed from Phi Sigma Alpha, established in 1927.)
**Tau**	1929–2018, 2021	Vanderbilt University	Nashville, Tennessee	Active	(Note: Chapter formed from Epsilon Pi, established in 1928.)
Xi (First)	1930–1936	University of Detroit	Detroit, Michigan	Inactive, Reassigned	(Note: Chapter formed from Sigma Phi Lambda, established in 1925.)
Upsilon	1931–1939, 1946–2021, 2024	University of Southern California	Los Angeles, California	Active	(Note: Chapter formed from Pi Kappa Epsilon (local), established in 1926.)
**Phi**	1933–1970, 1981-2021, 2023	University of Massachusetts Amherst	Amherst, Massachusetts	Active	(Note: Chapter formed from Delta Phi Alpha, established in 1915.)
**Chi**	1934–1968, 1981	Michigan State University	East Lansing, Michigan	Active	(Note: Chapter formed from Alpha Literary Society, established in 1929.)
**Psi**	1936–1971, 19xx ?	Johns Hopkins University	Baltimore, Maryland	Active	(Note: Chapter formed from Alpha Epsilon, established in 1935.)
**Omega**	February 28, 1937 – 1939; 1947–1951; 2002	University of North Carolina at Chapel Hill	Chapel Hill, North Carolina	Active	(Note: Chapter formed from Alpha Epsilon, established in 1935.)
Alpha Deuteron	1937–1982	Drake University	Des Moines, Iowa	Inactive	(Note: Chapter formed from the Men's Club (local), established in 1935.)
Beta Deuteron	1938–1952, 1965–1972	Louisiana State University	Baton Rouge, Louisiana	Inactive	(Note: Chapter formed from Alpha Epsilon, established in 1937.)
**Gamma Deuteron**	1939–xxxx ?, 2003	University of Texas at Austin	Austin, Texas	Active	(Note: Chapter formed from the Esquire Club (local), established in 1938.)
**Delta Deuteron**	1940–1987, 1993	University of Maryland, College Park	College Park, Maryland	Active	(Note: Chapter formed from Alpha Epsilon, established in 1936.)
Epsilon Deuteron	1940–1973	Worcester Polytechnic Institute	Worcester, Massachusetts	Inactive	(Note: Chapter formed from Sigma Omega Psi, established in 1918.)
**Zeta Deuteron**	1940–1972, 1984–2012, 2015	Boston University	Boston, Massachusetts	Active	(Note: Chapter formed from Sigma Omega Psi, established in the 1910s.)
Eta Deuteron	1940–1970, 1976–19xx ?, 1984–2015	Tufts University	Medford, Massachusetts	Inactive	(Note: Chapter formed from Sigma Omega Psi, established in 1921.)
Theta Deuteron	1941–1973, 199x ?–199x ?	University of Akron	Akron, Ohio	Inactive	(Note: Chapter formed from Phi Kappa Rho (local), established in 1921.)
**Iota Deuteron**	1942–1970, 2018	University of Alabama	Tuscaloosa, Alabama	Active	(Note: Chapter formed from Alpha Delta Epsilon, established in 1938.)
Xi (Second)	1947–1972, 1982–199x ?, 2019–2023	Wayne State University	Detroit, Michigan	Inactive	
**Kappa Deuteron**	1947–1970, 1977–200x ?, 2004–2013	George Washington University	Washington, D.C.	Active	(Note: Chapter formed from Pi Epsilon, established in 1946. After going dormant, it reformed as a colony in 2023.)
**Lambda Deuteron**	1947–2003, 2011	University of Miami	Coral Gables, Florida	Active	(Note: Chapter formed from Alpha Epsilon, established in 1946.)
**Mu Deuteron**	1947	University of Missouri	Columbia, Missouri	Active	(Note: Chapter formed from Alpha Mu, established in 1946.)
**Nu Deuteron**	1947–1953, 1966	Missouri University of Science and Technology	Rolla, Missouri	Active	(Note: Chapter formed from the Nuggets (local), established in 1946.)
**Omicron Deuteron**	1947–1952, 1960–199x ?, 2004	University of Cincinnati	Cincinnati, Ohio	Active	(Note: Chapter formed from Sigma Tau, established in 1920.)
**Pi Deuteron**	1947–1974, 1984–20xx ?, 2011	Pennsylvania State University	State College, Pennsylvania	Active	(Note: Chapter formed from Sigma Tau Phi, established in 1921. Later, it absorbed Phi Sigma Delta Sigma.)
**Rho Deuteron**	1947–1970, 1981–200x ?, 2007–2014, 2017	University of Delaware	Newark, Delaware	Active	(Note: Chapter formed from Sigma Tau Phi, established in 1925.)
**Sigma Deuteron**	1947–1973, 1978	Syracuse University	Syracuse, New York	Active	
Tau Deuteron	1947–1974, 1999–2009	Case Western Reserve University	Cleveland, Ohio	Inactive	(Note: Chapter was refounded in 2015 as a colony serving Cleveland Metro but went inactive before rechartering.)
Upsilon Deuteron	1947–1953, 1956–1965	University of New Mexico	Albuquerque, New Mexico	Inactive	
**Chi Deuteron**	1947–1961, 2000–2020, 202x ?	University of Washington	Seattle, Washington	Active	
Lambda (Second)	1948–2005	Illinois Institute of Technology	Chicago, Illinois	Inactive	(Note: Chapter formed from Praetorians, established in 1943.)
Alpha Upsilon	1948–1972	New York University-University Heights	Bronx, New York	Inactive	
**Xi Deuteron**	1948–19xx ?, 1996	University of California, Los Angeles	Los Angeles, California	Active	(Note: Chapter formed from Alpha Epsilon, established in 1947.)
Sigma Phi	1948–1972	University of Manitoba	Winnipeg, Manitoba, Canada	Inactive	(Note: Chapter formed from Sigma Phi, established in 1937.)
**Psi Deuteron**	1949–1953, 2014	University of Tennessee	Knoxville, Tennessee	Active	(Note: Chapter formed from Pi, established in 1946.)
**Kappa Upsilon**	1949–1973, 1982	University of Kansas	Lawrence, Kansas	Active	(Note: Chapter formed from B'Nai J’judah Club, established in 1947.)
**Phi Deuteron**	1949–1972, 1979	Kent State University	Kent, Ohio	Active	(Note: Chapter formed from Alpha Epsilon, established in 1946.)
Kappa Sigma	1949–1952	Kansas State University	Manhattan, Kansas	Inactive	(Note: Chapter formed from Beta Rho, established in 1948.)
**Beta Upsilon**	1949	Bradley University	Peoria, Illinois	Active	
**Chi Alpha**	1949–1967, 1985	University of California, Berkeley	Berkeley, California	Active	
Kappa Chi	1949–1972, 1987–2024	Queens College, New York	Flushing, New York	Inactive	
Omega Deuteron	1949–1970, 1973–1978, 1984–2024	University of Michigan	Ann Arbor, Michigan	Inactive	(Note: Chapter formed at the University of Michigan but was re-established as a citywide chapter.)
**Mu Upsilon**	1949–1973, 2004	University of Minnesota	Minneapolis, Minnesota	Active	
Upsilon Tau	1950–1973	University of Toledo	Toledo, Ohio	Inactive	(Note: Chapter formed from Kappa Iota Chi (local), established in 1923. Later, it absorbed Lambda Chi (local), established in 1925.)
Mu Tau	1951–2020	Massachusetts Institute of Technology	Cambridge, Massachusetts	Inactive	
**Alpha Sigma**	1951–2013; February 25, 2018	Arizona State University	Tempe, Arizona	Active	(Note: The university banned the fraternity for hazing in 2013 for four years; the national fraternity pulled the chapter's charter.)
**Iota Upsilon**	1951–199x ?, 2003	University of Iowa	Iowa City, Iowa	Active	
**Rho Pi**	1951	Rensselaer Polytechnic Institute	Troy, New York	Active	
**Phi Gamma**	1951	University of Florida	Gainesville, Florida	Active	
**Tau Upsilon**	1951–1972, 1979–199x ?, 2003–2016, 2024	Tulane University	New Orleans, Louisiana	Active	
**Gamma Alpha**	1952, 198x ?, 2007	Georgia State University	Atlanta, Georgia	Active	(Note: Chapter formed from Omicron Zeta Epsilon, established in 1949.)
Beta Pi	1953–1973	Polytechnic Institute of New York University	Brooklyn, New York	Inactive	
**Zeta Pi**	1954–1972, 1987	University of Vermont	Burlington, Vermont	Active	(Note: Chapter is not recognized by the University of Vermont due to hazing violations in 2014. Chapter is still recognized by the national fraternity.)
**Pi Upsilon**	1954–1971, 1976	Purdue University	West Lafayette, Indiana	Active	
Upsilon Rho	1954–1972	University of Richmond	Richmond, Virginia	Inactive	
Alpha Pi	1956–1972, 1980–2018	Temple University	Philadelphia, Pennsylvania	Inactive	
**Upsilon Kappa**	1956–1972, 1978–19xx ?, 1995	University of Connecticut	Storrs, Connecticut	Active	
Kappa Mu	1956–1972	University of Missouri-Kansas City	Kansas City, Missouri	Inactive	
**Rho Upsilon**	1956–2010, 2015-2025, 2026-	Rutgers University	New Brunswick, New Jersey	Active	
**Phi Theta**	1956–1971, 1988–20xx ?, 2014	Brooklyn College	Brooklyn, New York	Active	(Note: Chapter formed from Phi Mu Theta, established in 1934.)
Mu Epsilon	1957–1974, 201x ?–2023	University of Wisconsin–Milwaukee	Milwaukee, Wisconsin	Inactive	
Sigma Chi	1958–1973	City College of New York	Manhattan, New York City, New York	Inactive	
**Beta Iota**	1958–2008, 201x ?	Indiana University Bloomington	Bloomington, Indiana	Active	
**Upsilon Beta**	1958–1972, 1984–199x ?, 2003	University at Buffalo	Buffalo, New York	Active	
Eta Chi	1959–1973	Lehman College	The Bronx, New York	Inactive	
Mu Sigma	1959–1978	University of Memphis	Memphis, Tennessee	Inactive	(Note: Chapter formed at Memphis State University, now the University of Memphis.)
Omega Upsilon	1959–1973, 1983–199x ?, 2009 ?–2019	University of Oklahoma	Norman, Oklahoma	Inactive	(Note: Chapter formed from Lambda Nu, established in 1957.)
Theta Chi	196x ?–1970	Hiram Scott College	Scottsbluff, Nebraska	Inactive	(Note: The college operated from 1965 to 1970.)
**Beta Sigma**	1960–1973, xxxx ?	Baruch College	Manhattan, New York City, New York	Active	
Upsilon Chi	1962–1972	University of Tennessee at Chattanooga	Chattanooga, Tennessee	Inactive	
Lambda Upsilon	1962–1973	Long Island University	Brooklyn, New York	Inactive	
**Sigma Kappa Psi**	1962–1993, 19xx-	Northeastern University, Boston	Boston, Massachusetts	Inactive	(Note: The chapter formed from the Kappa chapter of Sigma Omega Psi, established in 1921, which was forced by the university to become a local, taking on the name of Sigma Kappa Psi in 1930. When Northeastern once again permitted national fraternities in 1961, Sigma Kappa Psi became a chapter of Alpha Epsilon Pi. The small national, Sigma Omega Psi, merged into ΑΕΠ in 1940.)
Alpha Epsilon	1962–1973, 1984–1999	Long Island University	Brookville, New York	Inactive	(Note: Chapter formed at C.W. Post College, now Long Island University.)
Rho Beta	1962–1973	Rutgers University–Newark	Newark, New Jersey	Inactive	
Pi Zeta	1963–1972	Old Dominion University	Norfolk, Virginia	Inactive	
**Rho Nu**	1964–1973, 2003	University of Rochester	Rochester, New York	Active	
**Upsilon Alpha**	1964–199x ?, 2001	University of Arizona	Tucson, Arizona	Active	
**Alpha Tau**	1964–1997, 2003	Miami University	Oxford, Ohio	Active	
Epsilon Kappa	1965–1972	East Carolina University	Greenville, North Carolina	Inactive	
Pi Chi	1966–1972	Parsons College	Fairfield, Iowa	Inactive	(Note: The college closed in 1973.)
Rho Mu	1963–1985	Randolph-Macon College	Ashland, Virginia	Inactive	
**Rho Iota**	1967	Rochester Institute of Technology	Rochester, New York	Active	
Delta Pi	1967–1972	Utica College	Utica, New York	Inactive	
Phi Chi	1967–1974	Cleveland State University	Cleveland, Ohio	Inactive	
Upsilon Omicron	1967–1972	University of Nebraska Omaha	Omaha, Nebraska	Inactive	
Delta Tau (First)	1967–1970	Detroit Institute of Technology	Southfield, Michigan	Inactive, Reassigned	
Nu Alpha	1968–1975	Northern Arizona University	Flagstaff, Arizona	Inactive	
**Nu Sigma**	1968–1974, 1982–1991, 1997	University of Nevada, Las Vegas	Las Vegas, Nevada	Active	
Rho Eta	1968–1970, xxxx ?–2019	Hunter College	Manhattan, New York City, New York	Inactive	
Upsilon Eta	1968–1971, 1976–1978, 1994–199x ?, 2013–202x ?	University of Houston	Houston, Texas	Inactive	(Note: Chapter formed from the Houstonians (local), established in 1967.)
**Phi Tau**	1968–1971, 1977–2018, 2020–	Florida State University	Tallahassee, Florida	Colony	
Kappa Gamma	1968–1999	Clarkson University	Potsdam, New York	Inactive	
Nu Eta	1968–1975, 2018–2019	Quinnipiac University	Hamden, Connecticut	Inactive	
Alpha Chi	1969–1975	Athens State University	Athens, Alabama	Inactive	
Omicron Chi	1969–1976	Oglethorpe University	Atlanta, Georgia	Inactive	
Iota Chi	1969–1972, 1995–199x ?, 2011–201x ?	University of Illinois at Chicago	Chicago, Illinois	Inactive	
**Sigma Pi**	1969	American University	Washington, D.C.	Active	
**Sigma Omega**	1969–199x ?, 2005	California Polytechnic State University, San Luis Obispo	San Luis Obispo, California	Active	
Lambda Gamma	1969–1981	Bowling Green State University	Bowling Green, Ohio	Inactive	
Epsilon Mu	1969–1973, 1989–200x ?	Eastern Michigan University	Ypsilanti, Michigan	Inactive	
**Phi Delta**	1970–19xx ?, 1990	University of Pittsburgh	Pittsburgh, Pennsylvania	Active	(Note: Chapters formed from Phi Delta Psi, established in 1967.)
Nu Tau	1970–1983	New York Institute of Technology, Old Westbury Campus	Old Westbury, New York	Inactive	
Lambda Epsilon	1970–1973	Fairleigh Dickinson University	Teaneck, New Jersey	Inactive	(Note: Chapter formed from Kappa Sigma Tau.)
Delta Tau (Second)	1970–1976	Lawrence Technological University	Southfield, Michigan	Inactive	
Epsilon Pi	1970–1973, 200x ?–2015	Virginia Commonwealth University	Richmond, Virginia	Inactive	(Note: Chapter formed from Epsilon Pi Sigma, established in 1968.)
Mu Phi	1970–199x ?	Florida Institute of Technology	Melbourne, Florida	Inactive	
Delta Beta	1970–1975	University of New Hampshire	Durham, New Hampshire	Inactive	
Iota Tau	1970–1976	Indiana Institute of Technology	Fort Wayne, Indiana	Inactive	
**Tau Phi**	1970–19xx ?, 201x ?	University of Tampa	Tampa, Florida	Active	
**Sigma Delta**	1970–1973, 1983–1990, 2002	San Diego State University	San Diego, California	Active	
**Sigma Alpha**	1971–1985, 2002	Virginia Tech	Blacksburg, Virginia	Active	
Tau Eta	1971–	Indiana State University	Terre Haute, Indiana	Inactive	
Lambda Kappa	1972–1975	University of Kentucky	Lexington, Kentucky	Inactive	
Sigma Mu	1973–1978	Central Missouri State University	Warrensburg, Missouri	Inactive	
Nu Iota	1976–1981, 2007–2019	Northern Illinois University	DeKalb, Illinois	Inactive	
**Chi Upsilon**	1977–1985, 1988–1993, 20xx ?	University of Colorado Boulder	Boulder, Colorado	Active	
**Omicron Upsilon**	1978	Ohio University	Athens, Ohio	Active	
**Sigma Eta**	1979–1992, 2001 (University-recognized in 2015)	Lehigh University	Bethlehem, Pennsylvania	Active	
Kappa Xi	1980–1982	Western Michigan University	Kalamazoo, Michigan	Inactive	
**Iota Beta**	1983–2005, 2018	Illinois State University	Normal, Illinois	Active	
Sigma Iota	1983–199x ?	Southern Illinois University Carbondale	Carbondale, Illinois	Inactive	
**Delta Kappa**	1985	Duke University	Durham, North Carolina	Active	
**Beta Nu**	1985–199x ?, 1998–2005, 2018	Binghamton University	Binghamton, New York	Active	
**Chi Nu**	1985	California State University, Northridge	Northridge, California	Active	
Iota Delta	1985–199x ?, 2005–2019	State University of New York at Stony Brook	Stony Brook, New York	Inactive	
**Alpha Nu**	1985–199x ?, 2004	University at Albany, SUNY	Albany, New York	Active	
**Eta Upsilon**	1986–1998, 2004	University of Hartford	West Hartford, Connecticut	Active	
**Alpha Kappa**	1986	Carnegie Mellon University	Pittsburgh, Pennsylvania	Active	
**Lambda Omega**	1986	University of Western Ontario	London, Ontario	Active	
**Pi Beta**	1986–200x ?, 201x ?	Hofstra University	Hempstead, New York	Active	(Note: Chapter formed from Pipe & Bowl, established in 1947.)
Upsilon Sigma	1986–2004, 2007–2018	Union College	Schenectady, New York	Inactive	
**Lambda Beta**	1987	Brandeis University	Waltham, Massachusetts	Active	(Note: Brandeis University does not permit or recognize fraternities.)
**Psi Phi**	1987	University of South Florida	Tampa, Florida	Active	
**Eta Pi**	1987	York University	Toronto, Ontario, Canada	Active	
**Tau Omega**	1987–199x ?, 1999	University of Toronto	Toronto, Ontario, Canada	Active	
**Omega Nu**	1987–19xx ?, 2014	State University of New York at Oswego	Oswego, New York	Active	
Omega Sigma	1987–200x ?, 2013–2015	State University of New York at Oneonta	Oneonta, New York	Inactive	
**Alpha Beta**	1988–200x ?, 202x ?	Muhlenberg College	Allentown, Pennsylvania	Active	
Chi Mu	1988–199x ?	Clark University	Worcester, Massachusetts	Inactive	
**Chi Delta**	1988	University of California, Davis	Davis, California	Active	
**Sigma Beta**	1988–201x ?	University of California, Santa Barbara	Santa Barbara, California	Active	
**Zeta Tau**	1988	University of California, Irvine	Irvine, California	Active	
Chi Beta	1988–199x ?	California State University, Long Beach	Long Beach, California	Inactive	
**Phi Alpha**	1989	Florida Atlantic University	Boca Raton, Florida	Active	
**Sigma Tau**	1989	Stanford University	Palo Alto, California	Active	
**Epsilon Chi**	1990–1993, 1997–2012, 2015–2021, 2023	McGill University and Concordia University	Montréal, Quebec, Canada	Colony	
**Iota Eta**	1990	Ithaca College	Ithaca, New York	Active	
Alpha Delta	1990–199x ?	Adelphi University	Garden City, New York	Inactive	
Delta Psi	1990–199x ?	Buffalo State College	Buffalo, New York	Inactive	
Phi Pi	1990–199x ?	State University of New York at Cortland	Cortland, New York	Inactive	
**Epsilon Upsilon**	1991	Yale University	New Haven, Connecticut	Active	
Gamma Sigma	1991–1996	State University of New York at Geneseo	Geneseo, New York	Inactive	
Rho Sigma	1992–2018	Ramapo College	Mahwah, New Jersey	Inactive	
**Chi Pi**	1993–200x ?	California State Polytechnic University, Pomona	Pomona, California	Colony	
Beta Psi	1961–2009	Rider University	Lawrenceville, New Jersey	Inactive	
**Tau Mu**	1993	Towson University	Towson, Maryland	Active	
Lambda Alpha (see **Lambda**)	1995–1999, 2001–2006	University of Chicago	Chicago, Illinois	Moved	
Beta Rho	1997–2015	Brown University	Providence, Rhode Island	Inactive	(Note: The chapter disaffiliated in 2015 and changed its name to Beta Rho Pi (local) over the attempted removal of non-Jewish members from the chapter by the national fraternity. After protests, the fraternity's executive director reinstated non-Jewish members to avoid media outrage. Beta Rho Pi was later kicked off campus for having cocaine at a rush event.)
**Delta Rho**	1998	Drexel University	Philadelphia, Pennsylvania	Active	
**Chi Sigma**	1998	University of California, San Diego	San Diego, California	Active	
**Nu Delta**	2000	University of Central Florida	Orlando, Florida	Active	
Eta Psi	2000–2017	Harvard College	Cambridge, Massachusetts	Inactive	(Note: Chapter disaffiliated in 2017 and is now known as The Aleph (local).)
**Upsilon Omega**	2001–2019, 2026	University of Oregon	Eugene, Oregon	Active	
Tau Delta	2001–March 2023	Northwestern University	Evanston, Illinois	Inactive	
**Eta Sigma**	2002	Georgetown University	Washington, D.C.	Active	
Chi Omicron	2002–2016	College of Charleston	Charleston, South Carolina	Inactive	
**Beta Chi**	2003	University of British Columbia	Vancouver British Columbia, Canada	Active	
**Kappa Omega**	2004	University of Waterloo and Wilfrid Laurier University	Waterloo, Ontario, Canada	Active	
**Pi Rho**	2004–200x ?, 2009–20xx?, 201x ?	Toronto Metropolitan University	Toronto, Ontario, Canada	Active	
**Nu Kappa**	2004	Carleton University	Ottawa, Ontario, Canada	Active	
Beta Alpha	2004–2023	San Francisco State University	San Francisco, California	Inactive	
**Sigma Zeta**	2004	University of California, Santa Cruz	Santa Cruz, California	Active	
Beta Epsilon	2005–2019	Babson College	Wellesley, Massachusetts	Inactive	
Psi Beta	2006	Bentley College	Waltham, Massachusetts	Inactive	
Upsilon Upsilon	2006–20xx ?	Yeshiva University	New York City, New York	Inactive	
Pi Tau	2006–2018	Princeton University	Princeton, New Jersey	Inactive	
Mu Delta	2007–201x ?	University of Maryland Baltimore County	Baltimore, Maryland	Inactive	
**Gamma Mu**	2007	George Mason University	Fairfax, Virginia	Active	
**Tau Pi**	2007	College of William & Mary	Williamsburg, Virginia	Active	
**Chi Rho**	2007	University of California, Riverside	Riverside, California	Active	
**Beta Delta**	2008	DePaul University	Chicago, Illinois	Active	
**Eta Theta**	2008	University of Guelph	Guelph, Ontario, Canada	Active	
**Omega Epsilon**	2008	James Madison University	Harrisonburg, Virginia	Active	
**Eta Omicron**	2008	McMaster University	Hamilton, Ontario	Active	
Chi Psi	2009–2011, 201x ?–2020	San Jose State University	San Jose, California	Inactive	
**Alpha Eta**	2009	The College of New Jersey	Ewing, New Jersey	Active	
**Aleph (Israel Alpha)**	2009	Interdisciplinary Center	Herzliya, Israel	Active	(Note: This chapter is not listed in the online Baird's Archive, apparently because it is placed outside of the US or Canada. An error or omission?)
**Kappa Phi**	2010	Queen's University at Kingston	Kingston, Ontario, Canada	Active	
**Gamma Chi**	2010	University of South Carolina	Columbia, South Carolina	Active	
Pi Omicron	2010	Portland State University	Portland, Oregon	Inactive	
Chi Phi	2011–2021	California State University, Fullerton	Fullerton, California	Inactive	
Bet (Israel Beta)	2011	Hebrew University	Jerusalem, Israel	Inactive	
Delta Upsilon	2011	University of Denver	Denver, Colorado	Inactive	
Upsilon Kappa Alpha	2011	University of St. Andrews	St Andrews, Scotland	Inactive	
Upsilon Kappa Beta	2011	University of Leeds	Leeds, England	Inactive	
Upsilon Kappa Gamma	2011	University of Birmingham, Aston University and Birmingham City University	Birmingham, England	Inactive	
Nu Theta	2011	Goucher College	Baltimore, Maryland	Inactive	(Note: The chapter was not recognized by Goucher College.)
Omicron Rho	2011–May 2021	Bloomsburg University	Bloomsburg, Pennsylvania	Inactive	(Note: The university banned all Greek life in May 2021.)
Phi Iota	2012–2024	Florida International University	Miami, Florida	Inactive	
Upsilon Kappa Delta	2012	University of Nottingham and Nottingham Trent University	Nottingham, England	Inactive	
Upsilon Kappa Epsilon	2012		London, England	Inactive	
Alpha Psi	2013–2016	Wesleyan University	Middletown, Connecticut	Inactive	
**Sigma Psi**	2013	Sonoma State University	Rohnert Park, California	Active	
Nu Rho	2013–2025	State University of New York at New Paltz	New Paltz, New York	Inactive	
Gamma Tau	2013	West Chester University	West Chester, Pennsylvania	Inactive	
Upsilon Kappa Zeta	2013	University of Manchester and Manchester Metropolitan University	Manchester, Greater Manchester, England	Inactive	
Upsilon Kappa Eta	2013	University of Warwick	Warwick, Warwickshire, England	Inactive	
Upsilon Kappa Theta	2013		Liverpool, Merseyside, England	Inactive	
Nu Phi	2013	Brock University	St. Catharines, Ontario, Canada	Inactive	
**Mu Gamma**	2014	University of North Texas	Denton, Texas	Active	
**Upsilon Nu**	2014	University of Nevada, Reno	Reno, Nevada	Active	
Theta Psi	2014	University of Calgary	Calgary, Alberta, Canada	Inactive	
Chi Chi	2015–201x ?	Claremont Colleges	Claremont, California	Inactive	
**Delta Chi**	2015	Florida Gulf Coast University	Fort Myers, Florida	Active	
Gamma Epsilon	2015–2019	Georgia Southern University	Statesboro, Georgia	Inactive	
Lambda Mu	2015	Texas A&M University	College Station, Texas	Inactive	
Phi Eta	2015	Lauder Business School	Vienna, Austria	Inactive	
**Alpha Omega (Second)**	2016	Chapman University	Orange, California	Active	
Omega Gamma	2016	Johnson & Wales University	Providence, Rhode Island	Inactive	
**Omega Zeta**	2016	University of New South Wales	Sydney, New South Wales, Australia	Active	
**Tau Chi**	2016	Southern Methodist University	Houston, Texas	Active	
Dalet (Israel Delta)	201x ?	Ben-Gurion University of the Negev	Beersheba, Israel	Inactive	
Hay (Israel Epsilon)	201x ?	Tel Aviv University	Tel Aviv, Israel	Inactive	
Vav (Israel Zeta)	2016	Bar-Ilan University	Ramat Gan, Israel	Inactive	
Zayin (Israel Eta)	20xx ?	College of Management Academic Studies	Rishon LeZion, Israel	Inactive	
Chet (Israel Theta)	20xx ?	Braude College of Engineering	Karmiel, Israel	Inactive	
Gamma Rho	2017–2024	Colorado State University	Fort Collins, Colorado	Inactive	
**Nu Chi**	2017	North Carolina State University	Raleigh, North Carolina	Active	
Gamma Upsilon	2017–2024	Rowan University	Glassboro, New Jersey	Inactive	(Note: Chapter formed at Glassboro State College, now Rowan University.)
Gamma Lambda	2017–2019	Concordia University	Montreal, Quebec, Canada	Inactive	(Note: Concordia University is included in the Epsilon Chi colony as of 2023.)
Kappa Lambda	2017	Emerson College	Boston, Massachusetts	Inactive	
Phi Beta	2017	Stockton University	Galloway Township, New Jersey	Inactive	
Theta Sigma	2017	University of Texas at San Antonio	San Antonio, Texas	Inactive	
**Chi Eta**	2018	California State University, Chico	Chico, California	Active	
**Gamma Beta**	2018	Wake Forest University	Winston-Salem, North Carolina	Active	
Tau Iota	2018	University of Texas at Dallas	Dallas, Texas	Inactive	
**Mu Theta**	January 26, 2019	Appalachian State University	Boone, North Carolina	Active	
**Delta Gamma**	2019	Grand Valley State University	Allendale, Michigan	Active	
**Mu Lambda**	2020	West Virginia University	Morgantown, West Virginia	Active	
**Epsilon Phi**	2021	Elon University	Elon, North Carolina	Active	
**Alpha Gamma**	2023	Dalhousie University	Halifax, Nova Scotia, Canada	Active	(Note: Chapter was established as a colony in 2013.)
**Omicron Sigma**	2024	Oregon State University	Corvallis, Oregon	Colony	
Alpha Upsilon Mu		Melbourne Metro	Melbourne, Victoria, Australia	Inactive	
Alpha Omega (First)	19xx–xxxx ?	Point Park College	Pittsburgh, Pennsylvania	Inactive, Reassigned	
Delta Delta		Duquesne University	Pittsburgh, Pennsylvania	Inactive	
Delta Phi		Jacksonville University	Jacksonville, Florida	Inactive	
Epsilon Zeta		Boston College	Chestnut Hill, Massachusetts	Inactive	
Epsilon Rho		Embry–Riddle Aeronautical University		Inactive	
Zeta Delta		University of San Diego	San Diego, California	Inactive	
Zeta Epsilon		New York Institute of Technology, Manhattan Campus	Manhattan, New York	Inactive	
Eta Iota		Honorary initiates		Inactive	
Iota Gamma		Southampton College	Southampton, New York	Inactive	
Iota Lambda		Dartmouth College	Hanover, New Hampshire	Inactive	
Iota Mu		Western Illinois University	Macomb, Illinois	Inactive	
Iota Sigma		Iowa State University	Ames, Iowa	Inactive	
Kappa Tau		DC Metro	Washington, D.C.	Inactive	
Lambda Rho		Loyola University Chicago	Chicago, Illinois	Inactive	
Lambda Tau		Texas Tech University	Lubbock, Texas	Inactive	
Mu Kappa		Murray State University	Murray, Kentucky	Inactive	
Mu Omicron		University of Maine	Orono, Maine	Inactive	
Mu Chi		Monmouth College	Monmouth, Illinois	Inactive	
Xi Epsilon		Rollins College	Winter Park, Florida	Inactive	
Omicron Alpha		Oklahoma State University	Stillwater, Oklahoma	Inactive	
Omicron Zeta		University of North Florida	Jacksonville, Florida	Inactive	
Omicron Chi		Oklahoma City University	Oklahoma City, Oklahoma	Inactive	
Pi Alpha		St. Johns University		Inactive	
Pi Delta		Pepperdine University	Los Angeles County, California	Inactive	
Pi Iota		Pratt Institute	Brooklyn, New York	Inactive	
Rho Kappa		Eastern Kentucky University	Richmond, Kentucky	Inactive	
Sigma Gamma		University of Bridgeport	Bridgeport, Connecticut	Inactive	
Sigma Omicron			United States	Inactive	
Sigma Lambda		University of Missouri–St. Louis	St. Louis, Missouri	Inactive	
Sigma Upsilon		Stetson University	DeLand, Florida	Inactive	
Tau Alpha		University of Texas at Arlington	Arlington, Texas	Inactive	
Tau Sigma	1970–1982	Tri-State University (Note: Tri-State University was renamed as Trine University in 2008.)	Angola, Indiana	Inactive	(Note: This colony was named Tau Sigma but was never chartered.)
Upsilon Kappa Iota		University of Bristol	Bristol, South West, England	Inactive	
Upsilon Lambda		University of Louisville	Louisville, Kentucky	Inactive	
Upsilon Sigma Alpha		United States Military Academy	West Point, New York	Inactive	
Phi Rho Alpha		Paris-Sorbonne University	Paris, Île-de-France, France	Inactive	(Note: The university closed in 2018.)
Chi Iota		College of Staten Island	Staten Island, New York	Inactive	
Omega Zeta Alpha		Sydney Metro	Sydney, New South Wales, Australia	Inactive	
Omega Omicron			United States	Inactive	
Omega Pi		University of Baltimore	Baltimore, Maryland	Inactive	
**Tau Beta**		Trinity College	Hartford, Connecticut	Colony	(Note: Colony formed in 2016.)
**Gamma Pi**			Kennesaw, Georgia	Colony	(Note: Colony formed in 2019.)
**Gimel (Israel Gamma)**		Technion – Israel Institute of Technology	Haifa, Israel	Colony	
**Eta Epsilon**			Golden, Colorado	Colony	
**Eta Rho**		High Point University	High Point, North Carolina	Colony	
**Nu Pi**		Virtual University	United States	Colony	
**Rho Alpha**		Radford University	Radford, Virginia	Colony	
**Rho Delta**		Dickinson College	Carlisle, Pennsylvania	Colony	
**Rho Lambda**		Chicago Metro	Chicago, Illinois	Colony	
**Phi Nu**		Nova Southeastern University	Fort Lauderdale-Davie, Florida	Colony	

== Alumni clubs ==
Club	Charter date and range	Location	Status	Ref.
Chicago	2008	Chicago, Illinois	Active	
Atlanta		Atlanta, Georgia	Active	
Cincinnati	2011	Cincinnati, Ohio	Active	
Baltimore		Baltimore, Maryland	Active	
Dallas		Dallas, Texas	Active	
Detroit	2016	Detroit, Michigan	Active	
Houston		Houston, Texas	Active	
Orange County		Orange County, California	Active	
Las Vegas		Las Vegas, Nevada	Active	
Long Island	2010	Long Island, New York	Active	
Los Angeles		Los Angeles, California	Active	
New York City	2010	New York City, New York	Active	
Philadelphia	2010	Philadelphia, Pennsylvania	Active	
Phoenix		Phoenix, Arizona	Active	
Seattle		Seattle, Washington	Active	
South Florida	Rechartered 2010	South Florida	Active	
Toronto	Rechartered 2010	Toronto, Ontario, Canada	Active	
Twin Cities	2011	Minneapolis and Saint Paul, Minnesota	Active	
Washington, D.C.	2014	Washington, D.C.	Active	
