= Slabodka yeshiva (Bnei Brak) =

Branch of the Slabodka yeshiva in Bnei Brak

Slabodka Yeshiva
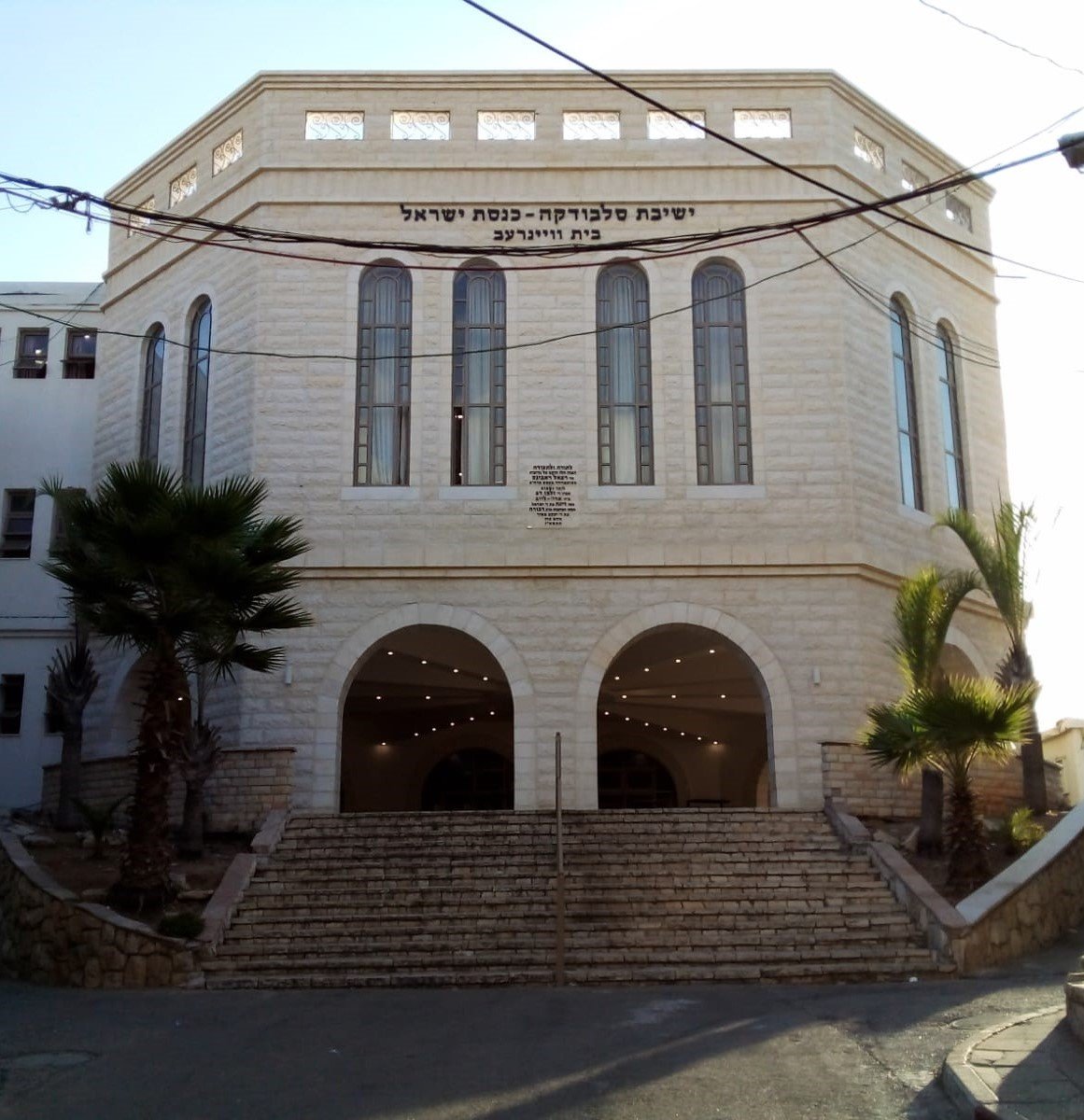

Location
- Bnei Brak; Israel
- Coordinates: 32°5′24.94″N 34°49′42.19″E

Information
- Denomination: Orthodox Judaism
- Rosh yeshiva: Moshe Hillel Hirsch

Slabodka Yeshiva is a yeshiva in Bnei Brak, Israel, founded by Rabbi Yitzchak Isaac Sher.

== Leadership ==
Rabbi Sher was succeeded by his son-in-law, Rabbi Mordechai Shulman who was in turn succeeded by his son-in-law, Rabbi Moshe Hillel Hirsch. Rabbis Dov Lando, Yitzchok Schwartz and Simcha Shmuel Sacks serve as Roshei Yeshiva alongside Rabbi Hirsch.

== Notable alumni ==
- Elimelech Biderman
- Yisroel Zvi Yoir Danziger of Aleksander
- Moshe Gafni
- Avrohom Genachowsky
- Yitzchak Dovid Grossman
- Chaim Kamil
- David Landau
- Meir Porush
- Amram Zaks
- Yitzchok Zilberstein
