= Biederman =

Biederman may refer to:

== Real people ==
- Charles Biederman (1906–2004), American artist
- Charlie Biederman (1918–1995), American musher from Alaska
- Dan Biederman, American urban redevelopment expert
- Don Biederman (racing driver) (1940–1999), Canadian stock car racer
- Elyssa Biederman (born 2004), American ice hockey player
- Felix Biederman, American podcaster
- Irving Biederman (1939–2022), American vision scientist
- Joseph Biederman (1947–2023), American psychiatrist
- Les Biederman (1907–1981), American sports writer and columnist.
- Oto Biederman (born 1973), Czech serial killer
- Will Biederman, American technologist and entrepreneur

== Fictional characters ==
- Leo Biederman, character played by Elijah Wood in the 1998 film Deep Impact

== See also ==
- Biedermann, a surname
- Biderman, another surname
- Biederman's Cabin, also known as Biederman's Fish Camp, a historic cabin on the Yukon River in Alaska
