= Biderman =

Biderman is a surname. Notable people with the surname include:

- Albert Biderman, sociologist who proposed Biderman's Chart of Coercion in 1957
- Ann Biderman (born 1961), American writer
- Bob Biderman (1940–2018), British-American novelist
- Charles Biderman (born 1946), American businessman and investor
- Dovid Biderman (1746–1814), Polish rabbi

- Moshe Biderman (1776–1851), Polish rabbi, son of Dovid Biderman

- Elimelech Biderman (born 1967), Israeli rabbi
- Jacob Meir Biderman (1870–1941), Polish rabbi
- Noel Biderman (born 1971), Canadian entrepreneur and marketer
