= Nissan Nemanov =

Nissen Nemanov
- ניסן נעמאנאוו
- Born: 13 Av, 1904; Zhlobin, Belarus
- Died: 9 Iyar, 1984 (aged 80–81)
- Resting place: Mount of Olives, Jerusalem
- Occupation: Orthodox rabbi

Nissen Nemanov (1904–1984), known familiarly as Reb Nissen, was an Orthodox rabbi who was a Mashpia (Hasidic mentor) in the yeshiva of Tomchei Temimim in Brunoy, near Paris, France. He taught many thousands of students during his lifetime, He was buried in the Mount of Olives in Jerusalem.

== Life ==
Nemanov was born in Zhlobin on 13 Av, 1904 to Yitzchak and Shaina Chaya Nemanov. He left home and went to study at the age of 12 in the yeshiva of the fifth Lubavitcher Rebbe, Sholom Dov Ber Schneersohn. The sixth Lubavitcher Rebbe, Yosef Yitzchok Schneersohn appointed him the rosh yeshiva (dean and mashpia in various yeshivas in Russian cities. In 1947 he moved to Paris and established a yeshiva in Brunoy.

Nemanov had four children.

== Sources ==
- HaPardes, June 1984, vol. 58, no. 9, pp. 30–31.
- Communicating the infinite: the emergence of Habad school, Naftali Loewenthal, pg. 298
