= David Landau (journalist) =

British/Israeli journalist and newspaper editor

- דוד לנדאו
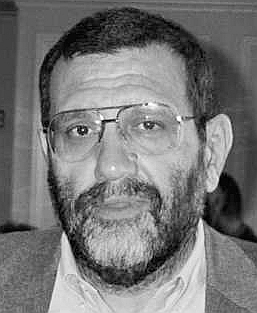
- Born: 22 June 1947
- Died: 27 January 2015 (aged 67); Jerusalem, Israel
- Education: University College London
- Occupations: Editor in Chief, Haaretz
- Spouse: Jackie Landau

David Landau OBE (Hebrew: דוד לנדאו; 22 June 1947 – 27 January 2015) was a British/Israeli journalist and newspaper editor. Landau was editor-in-chief of the Israeli newspaper Haaretz from 2004 to 2008. He was the founder and editor-in-chief of the paper's English edition from 1997 to 2004. Before joining Haaretz in 1997, Landau was the diplomatic correspondent of The Jerusalem Post for 12 years and its managing editor for four years. After leaving Haaretz Landau became the Israel correspondent for The Economist.

== Biography ==
Maurice David Landau grew up in the Golders Green neighbourhood of London. In the early 1960s, he studied at the Haredi Slabodka yeshiva in Bnei Brak. During the Six-Day War, he was an overseas student at the Hebron Yeshiva in Jerusalem. In 1970, after completing a degree in law at University College London, he settled permanently in Jerusalem.

Landau, an Orthodox Jew, was married to Jackie, a rehabilitation teacher of visually impaired children. They had three children together.

Landau died in Israel in 2015. For his obituary, The Economist wrote: "Mr Landau was a writer of wit and integrity whose thirst for justice for Palestinians and for a better understanding of Israel across the world was paramount. He will be sorely and widely missed."

== Journalistic career ==
Landau worked as a volunteer intern for The Jerusalem Post in 1967, after refusing to return home during the Six-Day War despite his family's entreaties. Landau was the first Israeli journalist to interview the Egyptian president Anwar Sadat. While working for The Jerusalem Post, he was one of the organizers who staged a walkout of journalists in 1990, claiming the paper's new owner was commandeering its editorial line and seeking to turn the paper into a platform for right-wing views.

Landau's book, Piety and Power: The World of Jewish Fundamentalism, was published in 1993. In 1996, Landau collaborated with the former prime minister Shimon Peres on his memoirs, Battling for Peace.

Landau replaced Hanoch Marmari as editor-in-chief of Haaretz in 2004. He stepped down in April 2008 but remained on the editorial staff. He was succeeded by Dov Alfon. In 2014, Landau published Arik: The Life of Ariel Sharon, a biography of Ariel Sharon commissioned by the New York publishing house Alfred A. Knopf.

Landau was appointed Officer of the Order of the British Empire (OBE) in the 2014 Birthday Honours for services to advancing UK/Israel understanding and peace in the Middle East.

== Controversy ==
In 2007, Landau stirred up controversy when he reportedly told U.S. Secretary of State Condoleezza Rice that "Israel wants to be raped by the U.S." in order to achieve a peaceful settlement with the Palestinians and that it would be like a "wet dream" for him to see this happen. In an interview with New York-based Jewish Week, Landau admitted to making a similar remark: "I did say that in general, Israel wants to be raped — I did use that word — by the U.S., and I myself have long felt Israel needed more vigorous U.S. intervention in the affairs of the Middle East."

According to The Jerusalem Post, in 2007 Landau said he had told his staff not to report about criminal investigations against Prime Minister Ariel Sharon in order to promote Sharon's 2004–2005 Gaza disengagement plan.

== Published works ==
- Piety and Power: The World of Jewish Fundamentalism. Hill & Wang. 1993. ISBN 978-0809076055.
- Shimon Peres (1995). Battling for Peace: A Memoir. Random House. ISBN 978-0679436171. (Coauthor)
- Shimon Peres (2012). Ben Gurion: A Political Life. Schocken Books. ISBN 9780805242829. (Coauthor)
- Arik: The Life of Ariel Sharon. Alfred A. Knopf. 2014. ISBN 978-1400042418.

== Book reviews ==
- Karl Wolff. "Arik: The Life of Ariel Sharon". New York Journal of Books.
