= Brunoy Yeshiva =

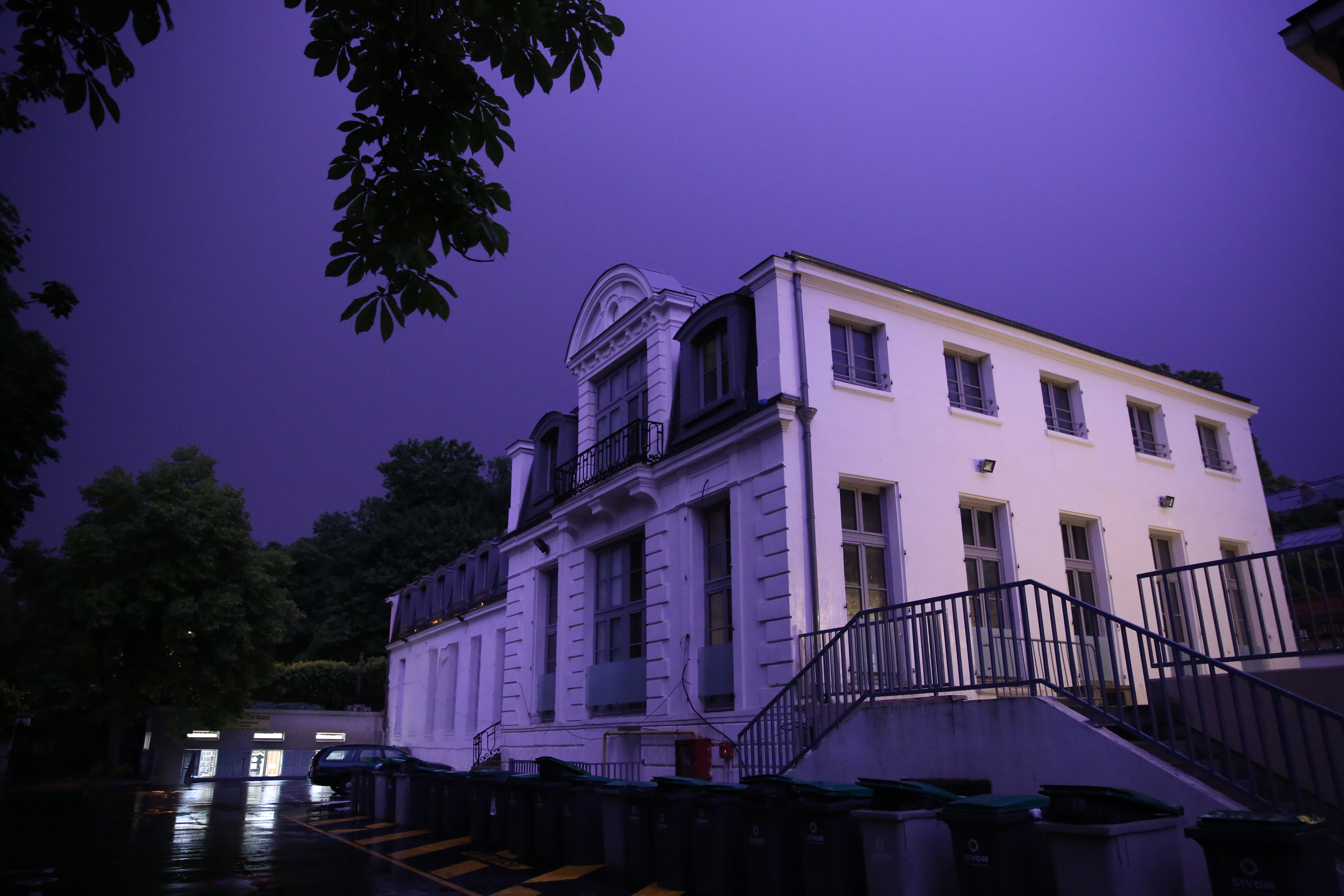

Location
- Brunoy; France
- Coordinates: 48.6954247°N 2.4966225°E

Information
- School type: Yeshiva
- Religious affiliation: Jewish
- Denomination: Chabad
- Established: 1947
- Rosh Yeshiva: Yechiel Menachem Mendel Kalmenson

Brunoy Yeshiva (French: Yechiva Tomhei Temimim Loubavitch de Brunoy) is a Chabad yeshiva in Brunoy, France. In 2024, the student body grew to 370 students, making it the largest yeshiva in Europe.

== History ==
A group of refugees from the Lubavitch yeshiva in Russia escaped antisemitism in the Soviet Union with false Polish documents. In 1946, they travelled through Poland, Czechoslovakia, and Germany, until they finally came to Brunoy. The Yeshiva was founded in 1947 by the Frierdiker Rebbe.

Since 1985, The "Amis de la Yeshiva Tom'hei Tmimim Loubavitch de Brunoy" has published the periodical "Tradition = Massorah".

Notable students include: Rabbi Nissan Nemanov, Rabbi Yosef Goldberg, and Yisroel Noach Belinitzki. Nemanov later became the mashpia of the yeshiva. The Baba Sali would travel to the Brunoy Yeshiva as the guest of Nemanov each year to prepare for the high holidays.

As of the Fall 2025 semester, 380 students from 22 countries were enrolled in the Brunoy Yeshiva.

== Academics ==
The Brunoy yeshiva contains both a mesivta and yeshiva gedolah. The yeshiva is known for its advanced level of learning. Shabbos Kestenbaum has referred to it as the "Harvard" of Yeshivas.

Since 2013, a track called "Tiferes Menachem" has been available for university students to spend between a few months to a year at the yeshiva. The Brunoy Yeshiva also takes in post high school students who typically learn for a year before returning to different abroad programs.

The Brunoy yeshiva has hosted a range of academic challenges. The Tanya Chidon is a test covering the scope of the entire Tanya. The semifinalists are tested questions orally, while the finalists take a written test. Tanya Ba'al Peh is an initiative for students to memorize sections or the entirety of the Tanya.

In Fall 2025, a Hebrew speaking class was introduced for first year students.
