= Christoph Biedermann =

Liechtenstein footballer

Personal information
- Date of birth: 30 January 1987 (age 39)
- Place of birth: Liechtenstein
- Height: 1.82 m (5 ft 11 1/2 in)
- Position: Midfielder

Senior career*
Years	Team	Apps	(Gls)
2006–2014	USV Eschen/Mauren	89	(12)
2014–2019	FC Balzers		

International career^{‡}
2007–2008	Liechtenstein	3	(0)
- * Club domestic league appearances and goals as of 19 July 2020 ‡ National team caps and goals as of 21 November 2009

Christoph Biedermann (born 30 January 1987) is a former international footballer from Liechtenstein who played as a midfielder. Biedermann last played club football for FC Balzers.
