= Dov Lando =

Israeli rabbi

Rabbi Dov Lando דב לנדו
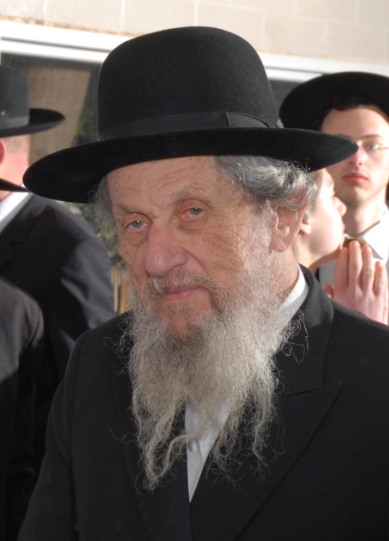
- Lando in 2008
- Title: Rosh yeshiva

Personal life
- Born: 5 April 1930 (age 96) Zgierz, Second Polish Republic
- Spouse: Adina
- Children: 1
- Parents: Tuvia Yosef Lando (father); Devorah Lando (mother)

Religious life
- Religion: Judaism

Jewish leader
- Yeshiva: Slabodka yeshiva (Bnei Brak)

Dov Lando (born Efrayim Dov Lando, Hebrew: אפרים דב לנדו; 5 April 1930) is the rosh yeshiva (dean) of the Slabodka yeshiva of Bnei Brak, Israel, along with Moshe Hillel Hirsch, a rabbi of Chug Chazon Ish, and a member of the directorate of the Board of Yeshivas. In his youth, he studied under Avrohom Yeshaya Karelitz as well as at the yeshivot of Ponevezh and Hebron.

With the death of Gershon Edelstein he became co-chairman of the Moetzes Gedolei Hatorah in Israel alongside Hirsch.

== Early life and education ==
Lando was born April 5, 1930 in Zgierz, Poland, to Tuvia Yosef and Devorah Lando. Lando immigrated to Israel at the age of five and studied in Litvish (non-Hasidic ultra-Orthodox) yeshivas, spending several years at Ponevezh Yeshiva and one year at the Hebron Yeshiva.

== Rabbinic career ==
In the 1970s Lando was appointed the Rosh Yeshiva (dean) of the Slabodka Yeshiva in Bnei Brak. Lando is a senior member of the Moetzes Gedolei HaTorah.

== Views on Israel and Zionism ==
In December 2023, Lando responded with "God forbid" when asked if yeshiva students should attend funerals for IDF soldiers or visit wounded soldiers in hospital. In October 2024, Lando was quoted as saying that "no member of the yeshiva, no member of the Jewish community, will go to the army under any circumstances." In February 2025, Lando published a notice in the Yated Ne'eman instructing his followers not to participate in Israel's national institutions, such as the Jewish Agency and Jewish National Fund, declaring that voting in the World Zionist Organization elections was incompatible with the religious principles of Judaism. Zionism, he said, was "a movement whose purpose is to establish the Jewish people on an explicitly secular foundation, rooted in heresy and rebellion against divine sovereignty." He clarified however that voting in parliamentary elections was permitted based on the precedent set by previous rabbinic authorities. At the time, a video was released by Channel 12 showing Lando at home in Bnei Brak stating that Zionism "had caused the Arabs to hate us" and had "brought physical disasters, not just spiritual ones, to the Jewish people." He opined that the "situation would have been excellent" if Israel had never been established and Jews instead lived under international or Arab sovereignty. He further castigated religious Zionist soldiers saying that "they are killed because their rabbis teach them a distorted Torah," claiming their military operations were often carried out not for saving lives, but for the honour of the state: "If the country sends soldiers in the name of honour, and they kill people, is that also allowed? It’s simply murder". Following widespread condemnation, he subsequently claimed his words had been misunderstood. He also described secular Israelis as having "no connection to Judaism at all," saying they had built "a state of apostasy and heresy". In response, former Israeli Prime Minister Naftali Bennett accused Lando's remarks as "anti-Semitic, anti-Zionist and anti-IDF". Head of the Yashar party, Gadi Eisenkot, condemned his comments, calling them as "slanderous", "outrageous" and "embody anti-Zionism in its purest form." In August 2025, it was reported that Lando had approached the Edah HaChareidis to consider cooperation in a coordinated effort to withdraw economic investment funds from Israel to protest of the arrest of yeshiva students who refuse to enlist in the IDF. In a recent public speech, Lando had warned that "if the State of Israel declares war on Torah scholars, the global Haredi Jewish community will rise up in protest."

== Students ==
- Avraham Gnichowski, Rosh Yeshiva of the Tchebein Yeshiva
- Michal Zilber (he:מיכל זילבר), Rosh Yeshiva of the Zhvil Yeshiva
- Zvi Meir Silberberg (he:צבי מאיר זילברברג), a Hasidic influencer
- Yehuda Silman (he:יהודה סילמן)
- Shaul Alter, Rosh Yeshiva of the Ger Yeshiva
- Moshe Yehuda Schlesinger (he:משה יהודה שלזינגר), Rosh Yeshiva of the Kol Torah Yeshiva
- Shalom Meir Jungerman (he:שלום מאיר יונגרמן), Rosh Yeshiva of the Zichron Michael Yeshiva
- Daniel Wolfson (he:דניאל וולפסון), Rosh Yeshiva of Yeshiva Netivot Chochma
