= Biderman's Chart of Coercion =

Table illustrating torture on American prisoners of the Korean War

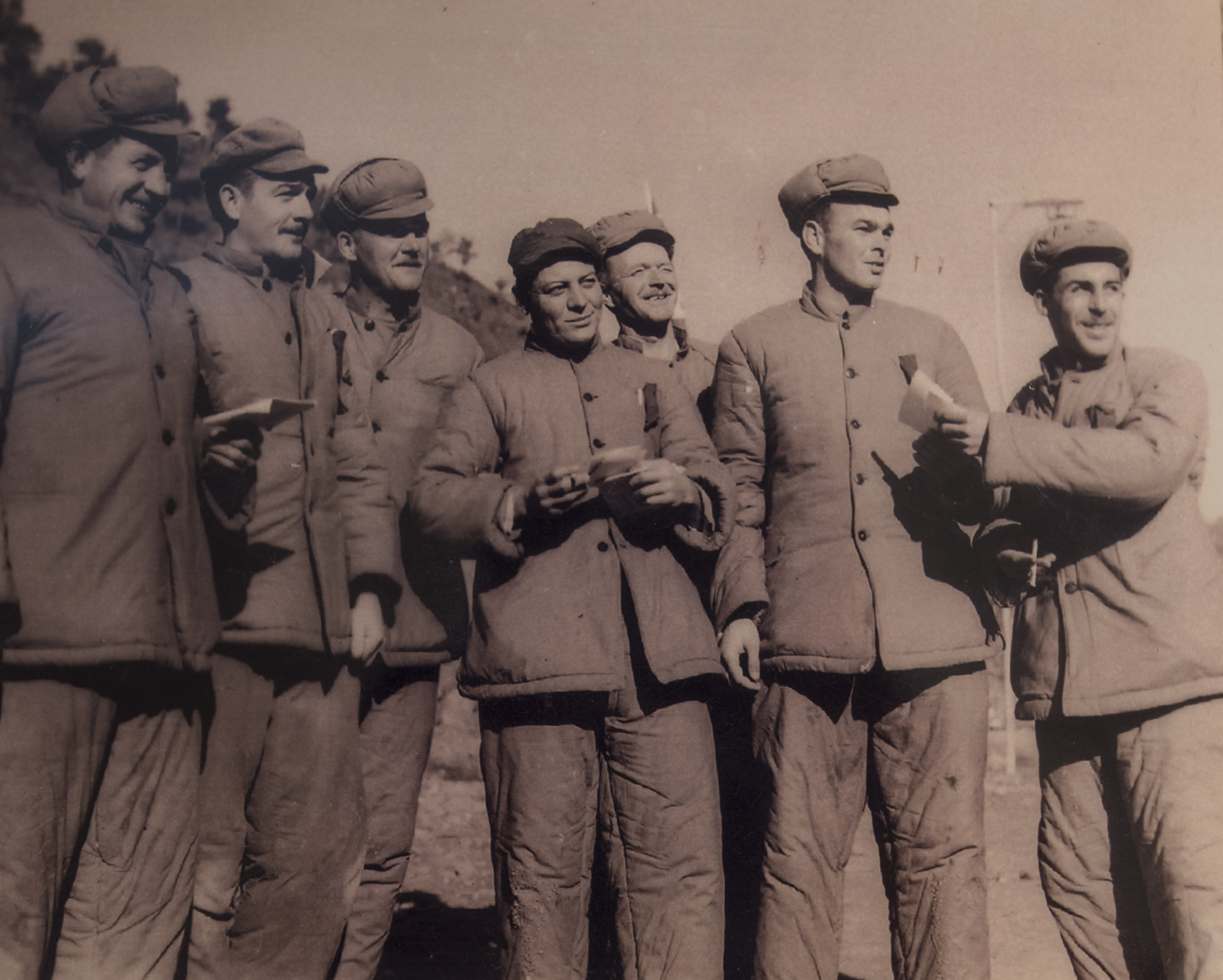
Biderman's Chart of Coercion originated from Albert Biderman's study of Chinese psychological torture of American prisoners of war during the Korean War.

Biderman's Chart of Coercion, also called Biderman's Principles, is a table developed in 1957 by American-born sociologist Albert Biderman (1920–2003) to illustrate the methods of Chinese and Korean torture on American prisoners of war from the Korean War. The chart lists eight methods of torture that will psychologically break an individual.

In spite of the chart's original Cold War application, Amnesty International has stated that the Chart of Coercion contains the "universal tools of torture and coercion". In the early 2000s, the chart was used by American interrogators at the Guantanamo Bay detention camp. It has also been applied to the psychological abuse used by perpetrators of domestic violence.

== Origin ==
Probably no other aspect of communism reveals more thoroughly its disrespect for truth and the individuals than its resort to these techniques.

— Albert Biderman

Biderman, a social scientist with the US Air Force, was assigned to research why many American prisoners of war (POW) captured by Communist forces during the Korean War were cooperating. After extensive interviews with returned POWs, Biderman concluded that there were three major elements behind the Communist interrogators' coercive control: "dependency, debility and dread". Biderman summarized his findings in a chart first published in the paper Communist Attempts to Elicit False Confessions From Air Force Prisoners of War in a 1957 issue of The Bulletin of the New York Academy of Medicine. The paper was an analysis of the psychological, rather than physical, methods used to coerce information and false confessions.

Psychiatrist Robert Jay Lifton conducted similar research into the same Chinese methods; coining the term "thought reform" (now known as brainwashing) to describe them in the same issue of The Bulletin.

== Coercion methods ==
The chart includes the following coercion methods:

1. Isolation
2. Monopolization of perception
3. Induced debilitation and exhaustion
4. Threats
5. Occasional indulgences
6. Demonstrating "omnipotence" and "omniscience"
7. Degradation
8. Enforcing trivial demands

== Later applications ==
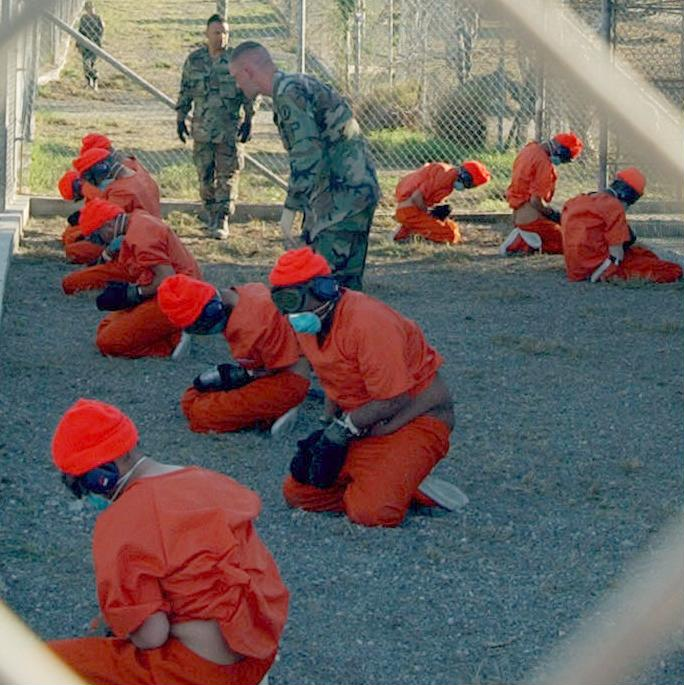
The Chart of Coercion was used by American interrogators to administer the Guantanamo Bay detention camp in the early 2000s.

In a 1973 report on torture, Amnesty International stated that Biderman’s Chart of Coercion contained the "universal tools of torture and coercion".

In 2002, US military trainers offered an entire training class to Guantanamo Bay detention camp interrogators based on Biderman's Chart. Documents revealed to Congressional investigators in 2008 revealed interrogation methods at the camp; The New York Times was the first to recognize that the methods were nearly verbatim those contained in Biderman's Chart.

Biderman's Chart of Coercion has also been applied to domestic violence, with many noting that the psychological methods used by abusive partners are nearly identical to those of the chart.
