= Elimelech Biderman =

Israeli rabbi

Rabbi Elimelech Biderman אלימלך בידרמן
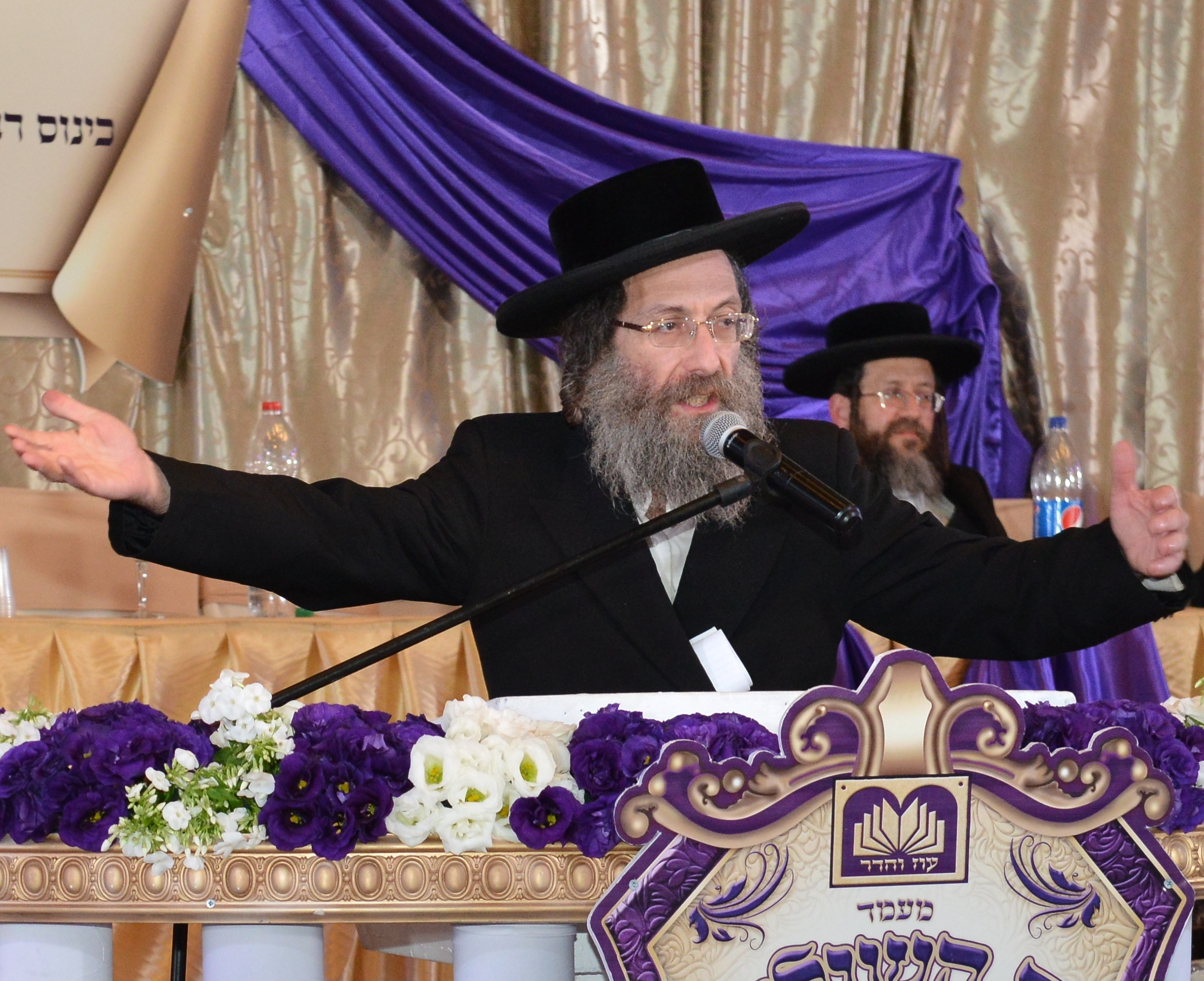

Personal life
- Born: 12 November 1967 (age 58) Bnei Brak, Israel
- Parent: Alter Elazar Menachem Biderman (father)
- Dynasty: Lelov
- Education: Ponovezh Yeshiva

Religious life
- Religion: Judaism
- Dynasty: Lelov

Rabbi Avraham Elimelech Biderman (Hebrew: אלימלך בידרמן; born 12 November 1967) also known as Reb Meilech, is a Hasidic Jewish mashpia and lecturer with thousands of students and hundreds of followers, although he is not officially a Rebbe.

== Biography ==
Biderman was born in Bnei Brak, Israel to Rabbi Alter Elazar Menachem Biderman the Bnei Brak Rebbe of Lelov (Bnei Brak). He was named after Rabbi Avraham Elimelech Perlow, the Rebbe of Karlin, and his grandfather's rabbi.

Biderman studied at the Ponevezh Yeshiva and then married the daughter of Rabbi Nosson Dovid Rosenbaum, the Rebbe of Zutska. He lives in Bnei Brak.

In the early 2000s, he began holding zitz at his home on Shabbat nights, with the participation of young Hasidic men, mainly from the Slabodka Yeshiva. He also began giving a lesson every Friday night to young Hasidic men, mainly from the Mir Yeshiva, at the home of his wife's grandfather, the Rebbe of Zvhil (Hasidic dynasty), Rabbi Shlomo Goldman, in the Beit Yisrael neighborhood.

In the late 2000s, he became famous, and he was invited to give sermons in synagogues and yeshivas, especially in preparation for Jewish holidays. He gave lessons at home that were broadcast abroad. Over time, a circle of students and admirers formed around him, most of them young married men. He used to visit his students in the cities of Elad, Beit Shemesh, Modi'in Illit, Beitar Illit, and Ashdod at least once a year. Once a year, he held a Shabbat Hitachdut (Shabbat of Unity) for all his students in Meron.

In his lessons and sermons, he deals extensively with matters of faith and trust in God, combining his messages with stories of the righteous and stories of modern-day divine providence. The lessons are broadcast via audio and video on the Kol Halashon system.

At his children's weddings, he usually holds a Shabbat in Meron, attended by approximately 1,000 of his students. Every year on the twelfth of Kislev, the yahrtzeit of Rabbi Avraham Dov of Ovruch, author of Bat Ayin, he travels with his students to his grave in Safed and to the grave of Rabbi Shimon bar Yochai in Meron. The event is attended by thousands of Hasidic young men and women.

On Lag BaOmer 2022, approximately 20,000 people participated in the lighting of his bonfire, which was held in Beit Shemesh. On Lag BaOmer 2023, according to police estimates, approximately 40,000 people participated in the lighting of his bonfire, which was held in Complex 89 in Meron. On Lag BaOmer 2024, following the cancellation of the celebration at the grave of Rabbi Shimon Bar Yochai in Meron, due to the Gaza war, his lighting in Beit Shemesh was the largest lighting in the world, with the participation of approximately 45,000 people.

Biderman also founded an organization called Be'er HaSimcha which helps widows and orphans. His students print a weekly newsletter with a collection of his talks called Torah Wellsprings, which is also distributed in English, Hebrew, Yiddish, French, and other languages. A free edition is distributed via email.
