= Moshe Hillel Hirsch =

Israeli-American rabbi (born 1936)

Rabbi Moshe Hillel Hirsch
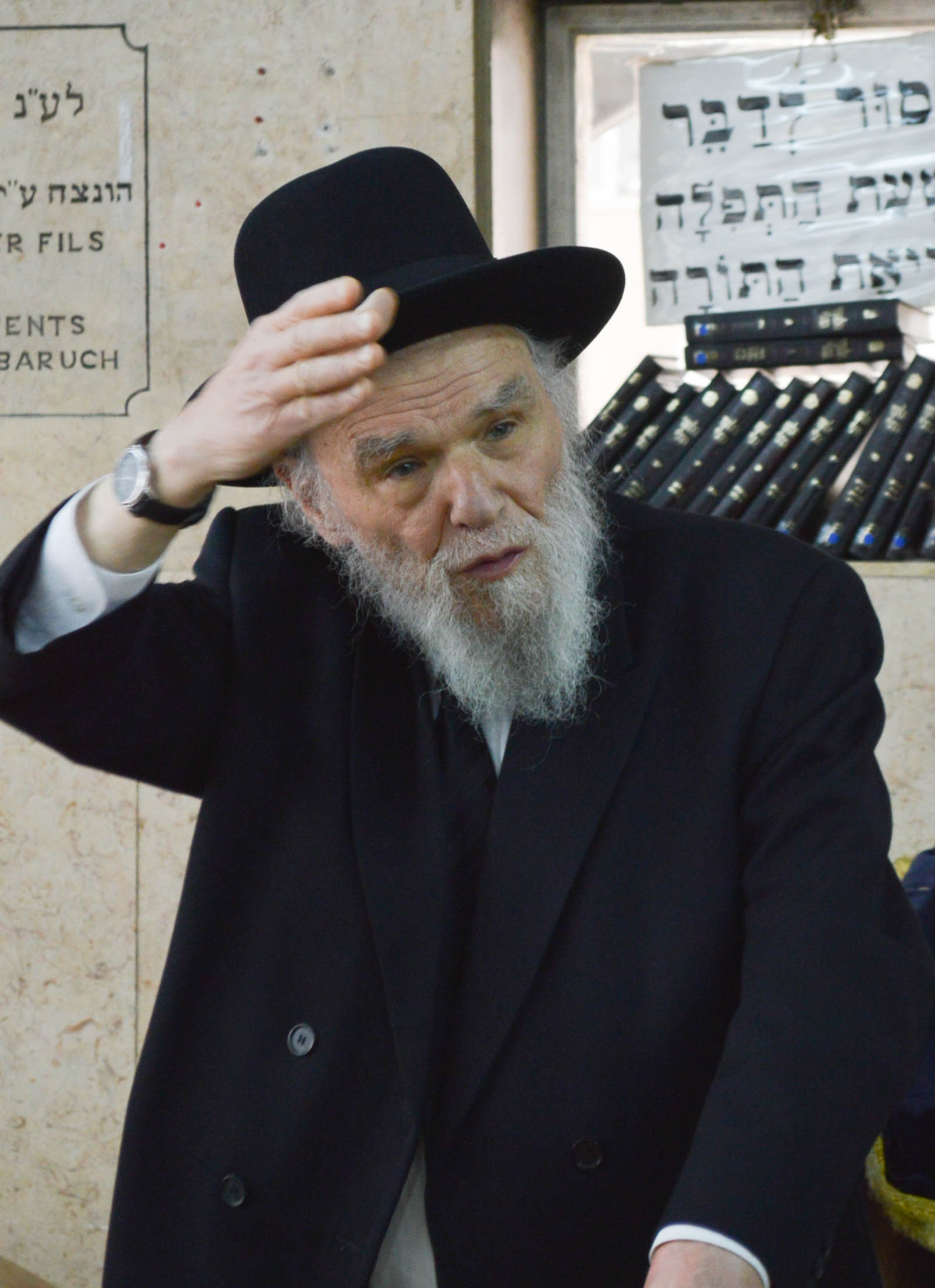
- Rabbi Moshe Hillel Hirsch

Personal life
- Born: Milton Hirsch; October 26, 1936 (age 90) New York City, U.S.
- Spouse: Avigail Shulman
- Children: 2
- Parents: David Hirsch (father); Malvina Hirsch (mother)
- Occupation: Rosh Yeshiva

Religious life
- Religion: Judaism

Jewish leader
- Predecessor: Rabbi Mordechai Shulman
- Position: Rosh Yeshiva
- Yeshiva: Yeshivas Slabodka
- Residence: Bnei Brak, Israel
- Semikhah: Beth Medrash Govoha

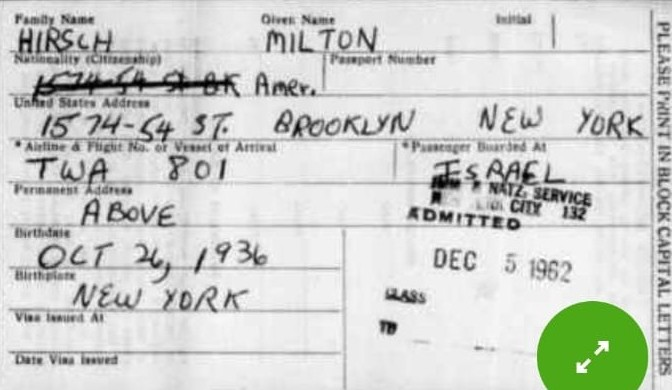
Rabbi Hirsch's return to the U.S. from studying in Israel

Moshe Hillel Hirsch (Hebrew: משה הלל הירש; born Milton Hirsch, October 26, 1936) is an American-born Israeli Rabbi. He is the Rosh Yeshiva of the Slabodka yeshiva in Bnei Brak, Israel, alongside Rabbi Dov Lando.

Following the death of Rabbi Gershon Edelstein in 2023, he became co-chairman of the Moetzes Gedolei HaTorah in Israel, alongside Rabbi Lando.

== Early life and education ==
Hirsch was born October 26, 1936, in Brooklyn, New York City, to Romanian immigrants David and Malvina Hirsch and was raised in the Borough Park neighborhood in Brooklyn together with his brother Elias and twin sisters Judith and Lila. He studied at Beth Medrash Govoha in Lakewood under the Talmudic tutelage of Rabbi Aharon Kotler.

Hirsch married Avigail Shulman in 1963, and permanently moved to Israel where they had two children.

== Rabbinic career ==
In 1982, after the death of his father-in-law Mordechai Shulman, he was appointed head of the Slabodka yeshiva in Bnei Brak, Israel, alongside his brother-in-law Rabbi Nosson Tzvi Shulman and Rabbi Amram Zaks. Other heads of the yeshiva appointed include Rabbi Dov Lando and Rabbi Baruch Rosenberg.

Hirsch is very involved in the halakhic leadership of Haredi Judaism. Despite living in Israel, Hirsch is quite well known on the haredi rabbinical speaking circuit in America. Hirsch eulogized Noach Weinberg, well known for founding Aish Hatorah, for an English-speaking audience.

Hirsch leads the 'HaMeshivim' organization, supporting hundreds of avrechim (young married scholars) in Lithuanian yeshivas across Israel, and guides the Lev Shomea organization for struggling youth.

Close to Rabbi Aharon Yehuda Leib Shteinman, he was appointed to the Moetzes Gedolei HaTorah (Council of Torah Sages) of Degel HaTorah in 2012 and is increasingly involved in public and educational matters, including the establishment of yeshivas and issues of yeshiva students' engagement with society.
