= Friedrich Karl Biedermann =

German politician (1812–1901)

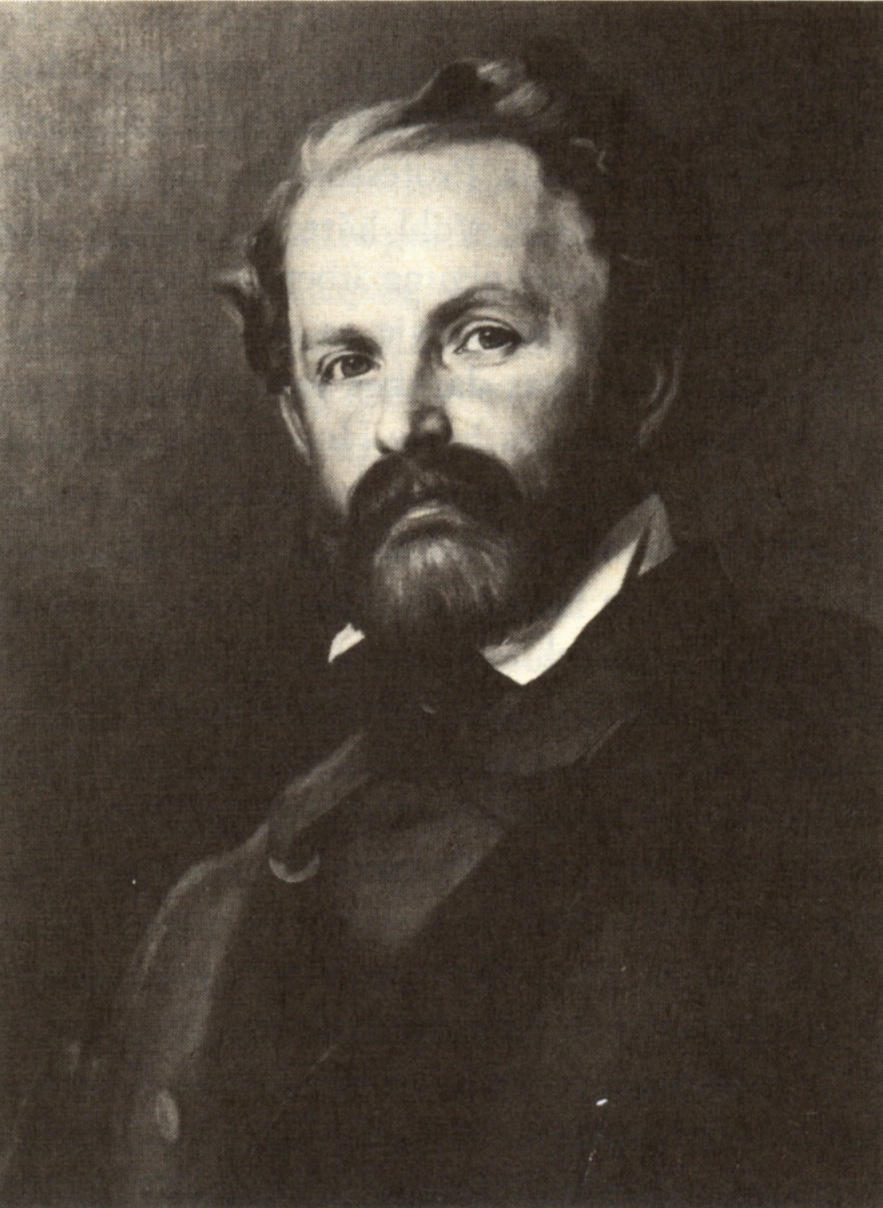
Friedrich Karl Biedermann (ca. 1845)

Friedrich Karl Biedermann (25 September 1812 in Leipzig, Kingdom of Saxony – 5 March 1901) was a German professor, politician, and publisher who greatly aided the Liberal movement in Germany during the process of German Unification.

== Early life and education ==
Friedrich Karl Biedermann was born in Leipzig on September 25, 1812. He lived with his mother and his father is the source of much speculation. Biedermann was an avid scholar at a young age and at the age of nine he entered a school in Dresden that was run by Free Masons. Bierdermann's stay was so traumatizing for him later wrote that he never fully recovered. Richard Bazillion suggests that his hatred of tyranny and oppression stems from this early abuse. Biedermann attended the University of Leipzig in 1830 and in 1833 attended the university in Heidelberg where he began to aspire towards a career in academics. He received his doctorate in May 1835 back in Leipzig and began to teach philosophy, becoming professor in 1838.

== The Social Question ==
During the 1830s and 1840s, Biedermann and many other liberals saw the divide between the working and the upper classes rapidly expand because of industrialization and rapid urbanization. His native Saxony was one of the most severely affected by this and was the most overpopulated German kingdom. Standards of living in urban areas and quality of life were overwhelmingly on the decline. The traditional guilds that protected pre-industrial workers were being dismantled as factories needed less skilled labor to produce a cheaper product. Karl Biedermann and other urban intellectuals saw the need to modernize quickly to improve living conditions and ensure that the emerging working class had decent standards of living. As social unrest developed and cities began to riot, Biedermann became more and more convinced "the social peace depended on social justice for the working class." His treatise on the Social Question stated that much of the burden placed on the working class could be lessened if the government used proper management and policies of social welfare. He published many articles about the Social Question in his quarterly journal and gave several lectures in Leipzig and Dresden between 1846 and 1847 on the subject. He studied many socialist thinkers and while he respected their commitment to social equality, he sided with liberalism and a reduced role of the state in social welfare.

== Political Role in the Unification of Germany ==
When he joined the Frankfurt Parliament in 1848, Biedermann had already developed a reputation as a strong liberal. He was a political and social commentator who was well known as an advocate of free speech, largely in part because of his prosecution of excessive censorship in 1845. Many recognized him as a leader of the liberal party in Saxony because of the acclaim of his trial. After the February Revolution in Paris, he led a Leipzig delegation to an audience with the ruler of Saxony, Frederick Augustus II, with the purpose of convincing him to open the Bundestag to popular representation. Frederick did not listen and Saxony began its March revolution. After the regime collapsed, Biedermann assumed a role on the Committee of Fifty that would serve as an interim government. He pushed for a Prussian monarch and a constitutional system similar to that of England. Throughout the entire process he was a staunch supporter of social reform in favor of the proletariat.

== After Frankfurt ==
Returning to Leipzig in 1863 he edited the newspaper Deutsche Aligemeine Zeitung and regained his professorship in 1865. He was again a member of the Saxon Upper House, and from 1871 to 1874 a member of the German Reichstag. He died at Leipzig on 5 March 1901.

Biedermann's chief works are: Erinnerungen aus der Paulskirche (Leipzig, 1849); Deutschland im 18. Jahrhundert (Leipzig, 1854–1880); Friedrich der grosse und sein Verhaltnis zur Entwickelung des deutschen Geisteslebens (Brunswick, 1859); Geschichte Deutschlands 1815-1871 (Berlin, 1891); Deutsche Volkessend Kulturgeschichte (Wiesbaden, 1901). He also wrote the dramas, Kaiser Heinrich V. (Weimar, 1861); Kaiser Otto III. (Leipzig, 1862); and Der letzte Burgermeister von Strassburg (Leipzig, 1870).
