= Yitzchok Zilberstein =

Orthodox rabbi (born 1934)

Rabbi Yitzchok Zilberstein
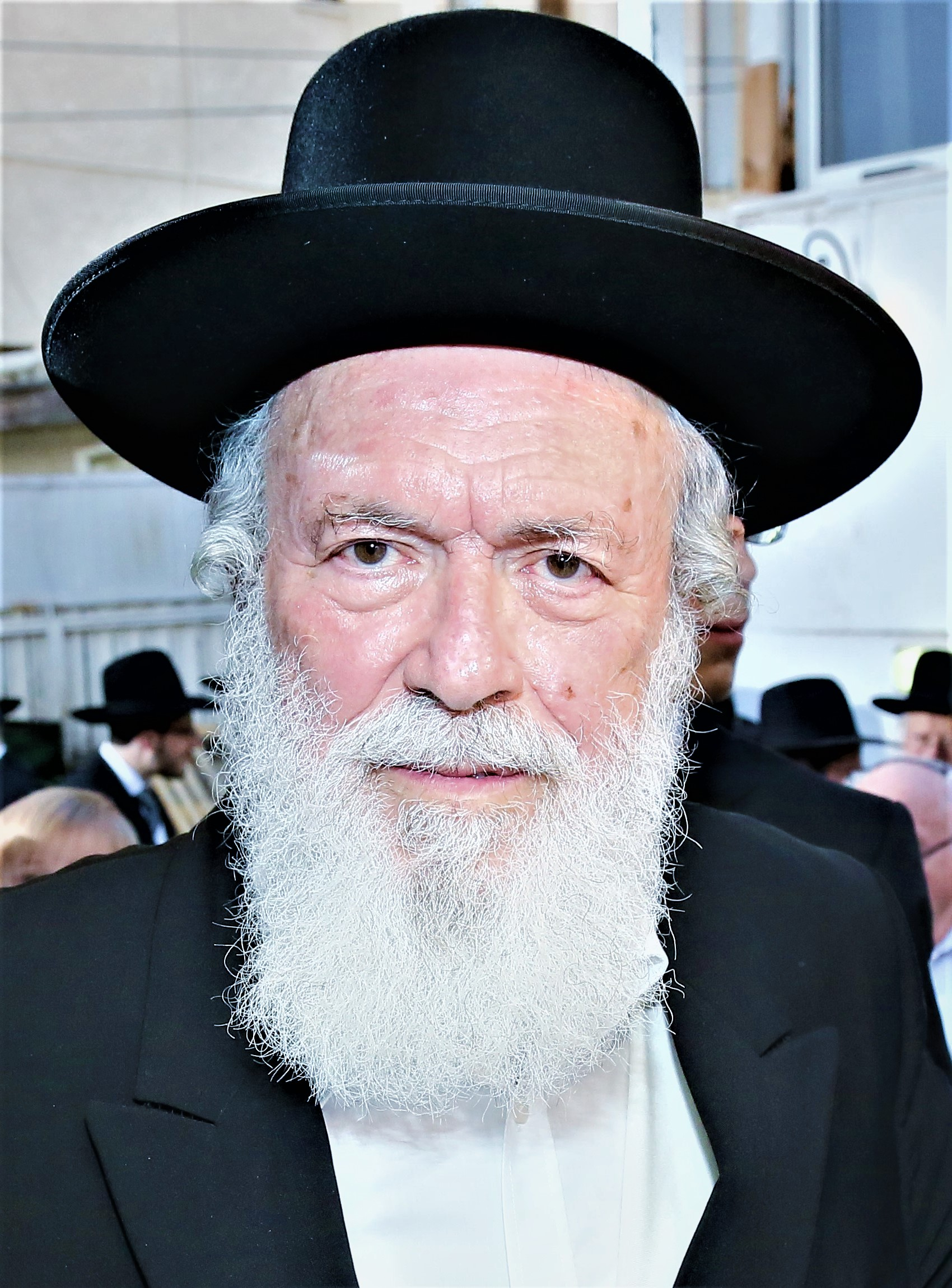
- Portrait of Rabbi Yitzchok Zilberstein

Personal life
- Born: Yitzchok Zilberstein; 1934 (age 91–92) Bendin, Poland
- Spouse: Aliza Shoshana Elyashiv (m. 1936; died 1999); Toby Tiberger (after 1999)
- Children: Avrohom; Arye; Leah
- Parent(s): Rabbi Dovid Yosef and Rachel Zilberstein
- Occupation: Posek, Rosh Kollel

Religious life
- Religion: Judaism
- Denomination: Haredi

Yitzchok Zilberstein (Hebrew: יצחק זילברשטיין, also spelled Silberstein) (born 1934) is a prominent Orthodox rabbi, posek (Jewish legal authority) and expert in medical ethics. He is the av beis din of the Ramat Elchanan neighborhood of Bnei Brak, the Rosh Kollel of Kollel Bais David in Holon, and the Rav of Mayanei Hayeshua Medical Center in Bnei Brak. His opinion is frequently sought and quoted on all matters of halakha for the Israeli Litvak yeshiva community.

== Biography ==
Zilberstein was born in Bendin, Poland to Rabbi Dovid Yosef and Rachel Zilberstein. The family emigrated to Palestine while he was a young boy, and he studied in the Etz Chaim Yeshiva in Jerusalem under Rabbi Aryeh Levin. In his teen years Zilberstein studied in the Slabodka yeshiva in Bnei Brak, where he became a student of Rabbi Yehezkel Abramsky, who gave him rabbinic ordination.

He married Aliza Shoshana Elyashiv (1936–1999), a daughter of Rabbi Yosef Shalom Elyashiv and granddaughter of Rabbi Aryeh Levin. She assumed full responsibility for the material management of her household and encouraged him to continue studying Torah. They began their married life in Bnei Brak, where Zilberstein studied in the kollel attached to the Slabodka yeshiva and received another rabbinic ordination by the leading posek of Bnei Brak, Rabbi Shmuel Wosner. Subsequently, Zilberstein moved his family to Switzerland, where he served as a rosh mesivta and maggid shiur in the Yeshiva of Lucerne for several years.

Upon their return to Israel, Zilberstein headed the Bais David Institutions in Holon, a largely secular city where he exerted a great influence over the entire community through his shiurim (Torah lectures), including a monthly shiur which he gave to religious and secular doctors on the topic of healing and halacha. In 1981 he was appointed Rav and av beis din of the Ramat Elchanan neighborhood of Bnei Brak.

== Family ==
After the death of his first wife at the age of 63 in 1999, he remarried Toby Tiberger and moved to her home in Ramat Gan. His sons, Avraham and Aryeh, are well-known rabbis and rosh yeshivas in Israel; his daughter, Leah, is married to Rabbi Dov Kook.

== Current activities ==
Zilberstein is an acknowledged halachic authority and is renowned as an expert in medical issues related to halacha, including organ transplant, abortion, in vitro fertilization, and multi-fetal pregnancy reduction. He is a regular speaker at the annual Jerusalem Center for Research Yarchei Kallah on Medicine and Halacha.

In 1999 Zilberstein was appointed to a special beis din composed of leading Orthodox halachic authorities who convened to study the effects of the Internet on Orthodox families and students. This beis din issued a daas Torah (Torah proclamation) against the use of the computer for entertainment — such as video games and films — rather than for business purposes. In 2009 Zilberstein was a member of a committee which investigated conversion and civil marriage in Israel and gave its recommendations to Rabbi Yosef Shalom Elyashiv prior to his rendering a psak (halachic decision) on the issue.

== Popular appeal ==
Zilberstein's teachings have gained popular appeal with the publication of books containing stories and advice, organized according to the weekly Torah reading. These are: Aleinu L'Shabayach: Pirkei Chizuk V'Emunah ("We Are Obligated to Praise: Chapters of Encouragement and Faith"), Tuv'cha Yabi'u: Ma'amarei Chizuk, Hashkafa Umussar ("They Will Speak Your Goodness: Words of Encouragement, Philosophy and Mussar"), and Barchi Nafshi: Pirkei Chizuk V'Emunah ("Bless My Soul: Chapters of Encouragement and Faith"). Vehaarevna Na: "Halachic Challenges" and "What If". Aleinu L'shabayach (the title is taken from the Aleinu prayer at the end of the daily prayer service), compiled by Zilberstein's student, Rabbi Moshe Michael Tzoren, is based on the Zilberstein's private writings, shiurim and conversations; it includes a wealth of stories based on unusual she'eilos (questions) received by the Bnei Brak posek. The Hebrew-language series sold in the tens of thousands, becoming one of the best-selling titles on the market. In 2009, the first English translation of Aleinu L'shabayach on the Book of Genesis was published by ArtScroll; it was followed by a translation of his volumes on the Book of Exodus and Book of Leviticus as of March 2010. Tuvcha Yabi'u ("They Will Speak Your Goodness"), a 2-volume set, and Barchi Nafshi ("Bless My Soul"), are also edited by Tzoren.

== Selected bibliography ==
- Aleinu L'shabayach ("We are Obligated to Praise") (6 volumes in Hebrew; 5 volumes in English published by ArtScroll, 2009-2012)
- Tuvcha Yabi'u ("They Will Speak Your Goodness"), Hebrew, 2-volume set
- Barchi Nafshi ("Bless My Soul"), Hebrew, 3 volumes published to date
- Chashukei Chemed on Shas
- Toras Hayoledes ("Law of the Childbearing Woman")
- What If... - Fascinating Halachic discussions, for the Shabbos Table, arranged according to the weekly Torah Reading (5 volumes in English published by ArtScroll, 2012-2022)
- What If... on Yomim Tovim - Fascinating halachic discussions for the Yom Tov table (2 volumes in English published by ArtScroll, 2017-2020)
- The Joyful Jewish Home (in English published by ArtScroll, 2018)

== Sources ==
This article incorporates material from the Hebrew Wikipedia article, he:יצחק זילברשטיין.
