= Lauder Business School =

Business school in Vienna

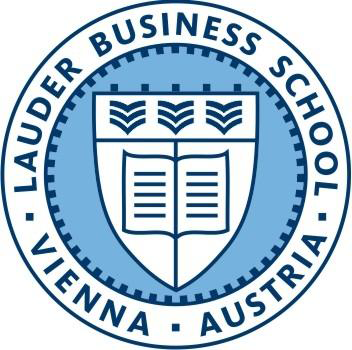
- Type: Business School
- Established: 2003
- Students: 420
- Location: Hofzeile 18-20, A-1190 Vienna, Austria; 48°14′32″N 16°21′11″E
- Campus: Urban
- Colors: Blue and White
- Nickname: LBS
- Website: www.lbs.ac.at

Lauder Business School (LBS) was founded in 2003 in Vienna as a fully recognised and partly government-funded University of Applied Sciences. All degree programs are in line with the Bologna requirements, accredited by the Austrian Agency for Quality Assurance and listed with the Austrian Federal Ministry of Science, Research and Economy. As of 2024, a total of 420 students are enrolled in one undergraduate program (International Business Administration), two graduate on-campus programs (International Management and Leadership, Strategic Finance and Business Analytics) and two graduate online programs, the online MBA and the online Executive MBA (for a Masters of Business Administration and an Executive Masters of Business Administration, respectively).

== History and development ==
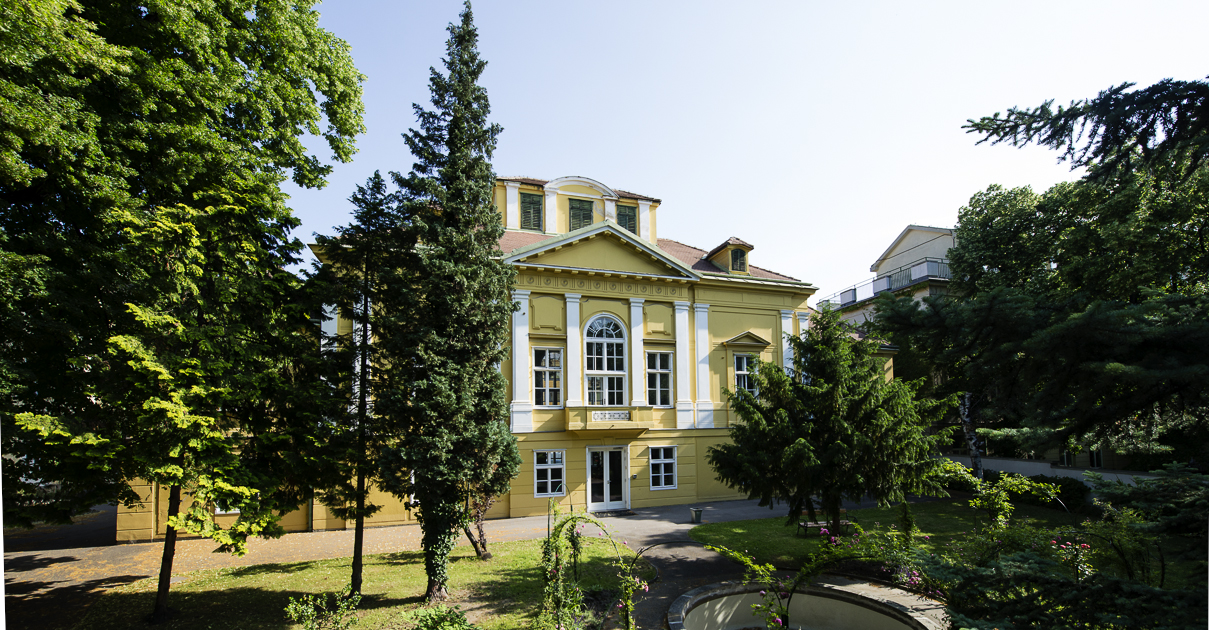
Main building

In 2003, the Ronald Lauder Foundation established the Lauder Business School, under its President Ronald S. Lauder. Vienna as a location was chosen as a bridge between western and eastern traditions and to form an international University. During the first years of its existence, Lauder Business School offered an 8-semester Magister degree in International Marketing and Management. In 2007, the curriculum included a 6-semester undergraduate and a 4-semester graduate program in Intercultural Business Administration and Intercultural Management and Leadership, respectively. Currently, Lauder Business School offers one full-time undergraduate program in International Business Administration, and two graduates programs for a Masters in International Management and Leadership and Strategic Finance and Business Analytics. In 2024, an online-MBA and online-EMBA were introduced.

In 2018, Lauder Business School began the extensive process of getting its study programs recognised for their excellence in the United States, by the U.S. quality assurance agency Accreditation Council for Business Schools and Programs (ACBSP), and received its accreditation in 2024.

== Campus ==
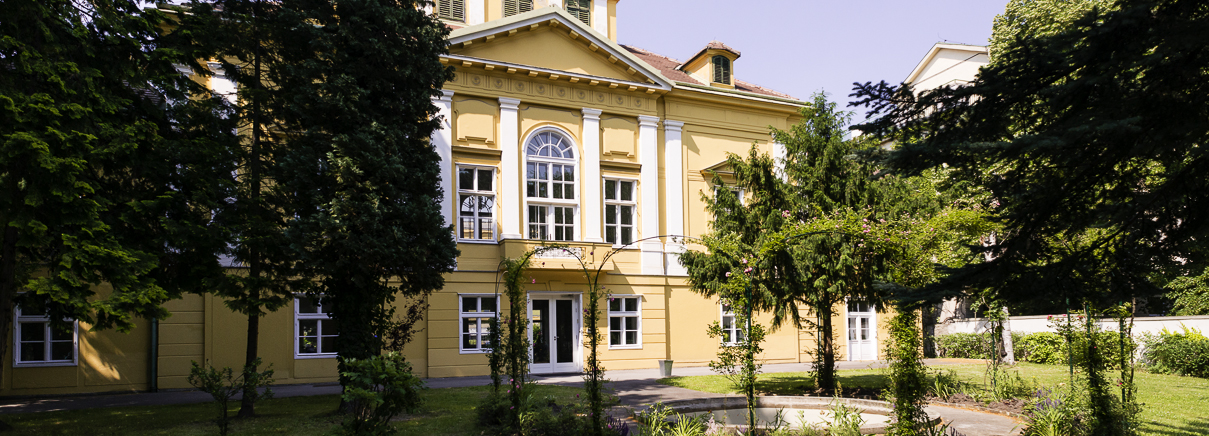
Main building

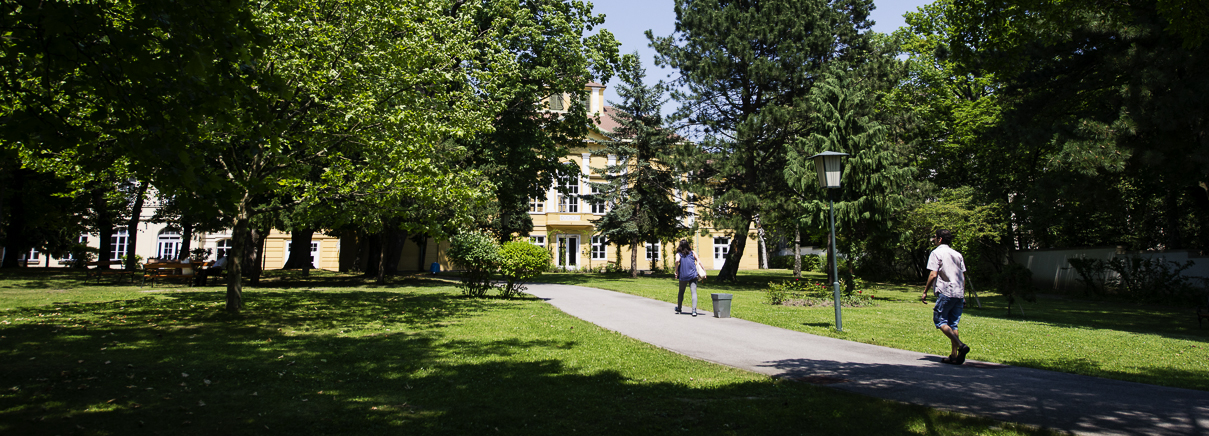
Campus of the LBS

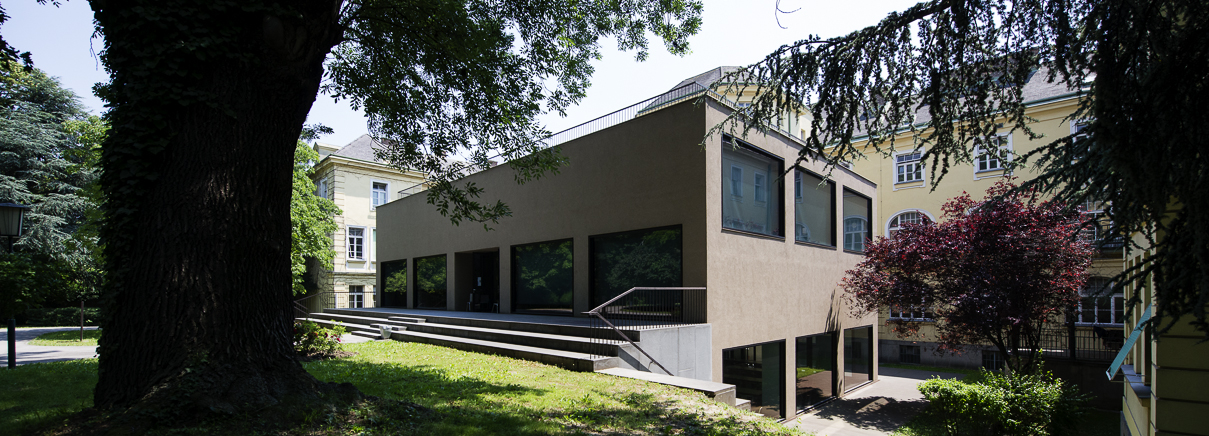
New Building

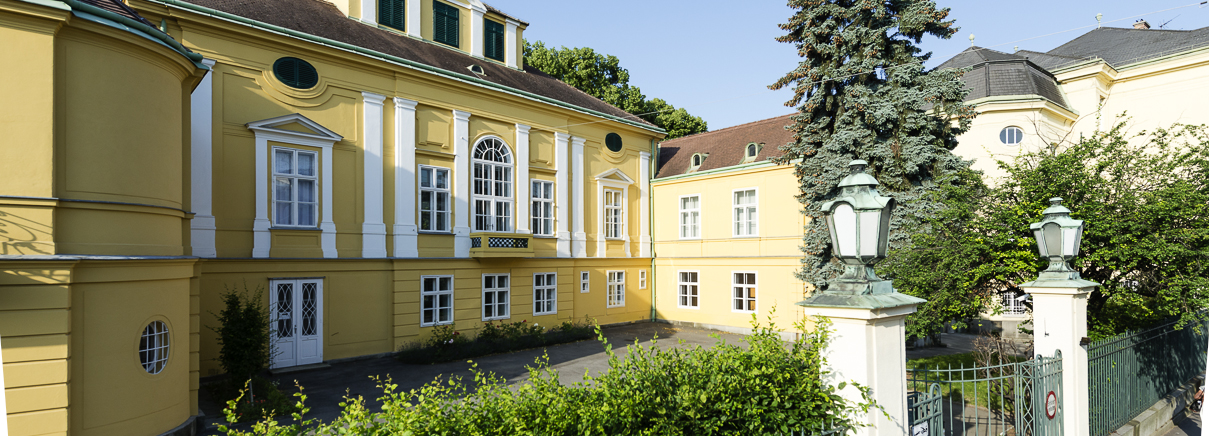
Main building of the LBS

The campus at Lauder Business School, situated in the Döbling district of Vienna, between Pyrkergasse and Hofzeile, includes a main building with classrooms, a library, an administration building, auditoriums, a dining building and a student residence (in cooperation with Jewish Heritage Center). The main part, which is located in the north, has a size of 1.200 m² that provides enough space for lecture- and seminar rooms. Another 750 m² are used as office space. At the southern end of the park the student residence is located.
These buildings (except one for the auditorium and dining room, which was built especially for the school) comprise a former palace of Maria Theresa, given to her by Charles IV and built by Nicolò Pacassi. Later the building was owned by members of the Rothschild family and served as a hospital. The Bank Austria Creditanstalt Auditorium was built in 2003 and is dedicated to Gerhard Randa, former chairman of BA-CA. The conversion and extension of the baroque ensemble of Lauder Business School was done by Kuhn Malvezzi, a Berlin-based architecture bureau.

== Educational programs ==
The university offers the following studies:

- International Business Administration – Bachelor (6 semesters, 180 ECTS): The studies focus on an international, competitive education with a great part of practical application. The graduates will be prepared to work at international organizations or enterprises.
- International Management and Leadership – Master (4 semesters, 120 ECTS): During this academic program students deepen their knowledge in applied business administration and increase their management and leadership skills. The graduates are trained to work in upper management positions in globally oriented companies. The Master centers on learning the foundations of executive management as for example decision-making and learning to strategize within complex structures. Students also receive a SAP beginner´s certificate.
- Strategic Finance and Business Analytics – Master (4 semesters, 120 ECTS): The program combines contemporary knowledge and concepts in the field of international finance and corporate strategy with the latest trends in business analytics. The curriculum is designed to provide students with an in-depth understanding of the finance sector as well as the appropriate financial management of corporations in the non-financial industry.
- Online MBA - Master in Business Administration (4 semesters, 120 ECTS): The LBS online MBA is a two-year program designed to enhance your professional experience and propel your career forward. With a curriculum centered on real-world practice and taught by professionals leading in their fields, the program is designed with the working professional in mind, offering majors in Green & Sustainable Business Management or International & Digital Marketing.
- Online Executive MBA - Master in Business Administration (4 semesters, 120 ECTS): The LBS online Executive MBA is a two-year program created for working professionals, no Bachelor’s degree required. The LBS online Executive MBA (EMBA) program is designed for experienced professionals seeking to advance their leadership and strategic decision-making skills. Modeled on US teaching methods and featuring real-world insights from industry experts, the program offers specializations in green and sustainable business management and international and digital marketing.

The university offers within their own language department classes in German, Hebrew, Russian and Spanish. The students are required to choose at least one of those languages to develop intercultural competences.

== International collaborations and research ==
The LBS has diverse international partnerships with institutions or companies such as the Ben-Gurion University of the Negev, Bar-Ilan University, and Reichman University. In 2024, LBS partnered with Longwood University, Virginia, USA, and in 2025 LBS closed a new exchange partnership with Saint Martin´s University in Lacey, Washington, USA!

== Integration of Judaism ==
The university itself is secular, and there is no influence of religion on the business studies curriculum. But LBS is adjusted to Jews and people interested in Judaism. There are no classes on the major Jewish holidays, nor on Austrian bank holidays.

== See also ==
- Education in Austria
- List of business schools in Europe
