= Chaim Kamil =

Chaim Kamil (Hebrew: חיים קמיל; 1933–2005) was a rabbi and the rosh yeshiva (dean) of the yeshiva of Ofakim, Israel. He was a student of Rabbi Chaim Shmuelevitz. Kamil also delivered weekly Talmudic lectures in the yeshiva at Tifrach, Israel.

Many of Kamil's Musar-oriented lectures have been published under the name "Imrei Chaim".

== Sources ==
- obituary of Kamil
