= Kaminetz =

Kaminetz may refer to:

- Kaminetz Yeshiva, Orthodox Jewish Talmudic college in Belarus before World War II
- Yeshiva Toras Emes Kaminetz, Orthodox Jewish school (Pre-K through high school), in Brooklyn, NY
- Yeshivas Kaminetz (Jerusalem), founded 1945 in Israel

== See also ==
- Kamenitz (disambiguation)
- Kamenica (disambiguation)
