= Belaya Vezha =

Belaya Vezha (White Tower in Russian and Belarusian) may refer to:

- Belaya Vezha, Russia– the Khazar fortress of Sarkel (White Tower) on the Don River, Russia
- Belaya Vezha, Belarus – the tower of Kamyanyets in Brest Region, erroneously called White Tower
- Belavezhskaya Pushcha – a national park in Brest Region, Belarus
- Belavezha Accords – signed in Belavezhskaya Pushcha National Park (December 1991) on the dissolution of the USSR and the creation of CIS
