= Yeshivas Kaminetz (Jerusalem) =

New York (state) hospital system

Coordinates: 31.79278°N 35.21772°E

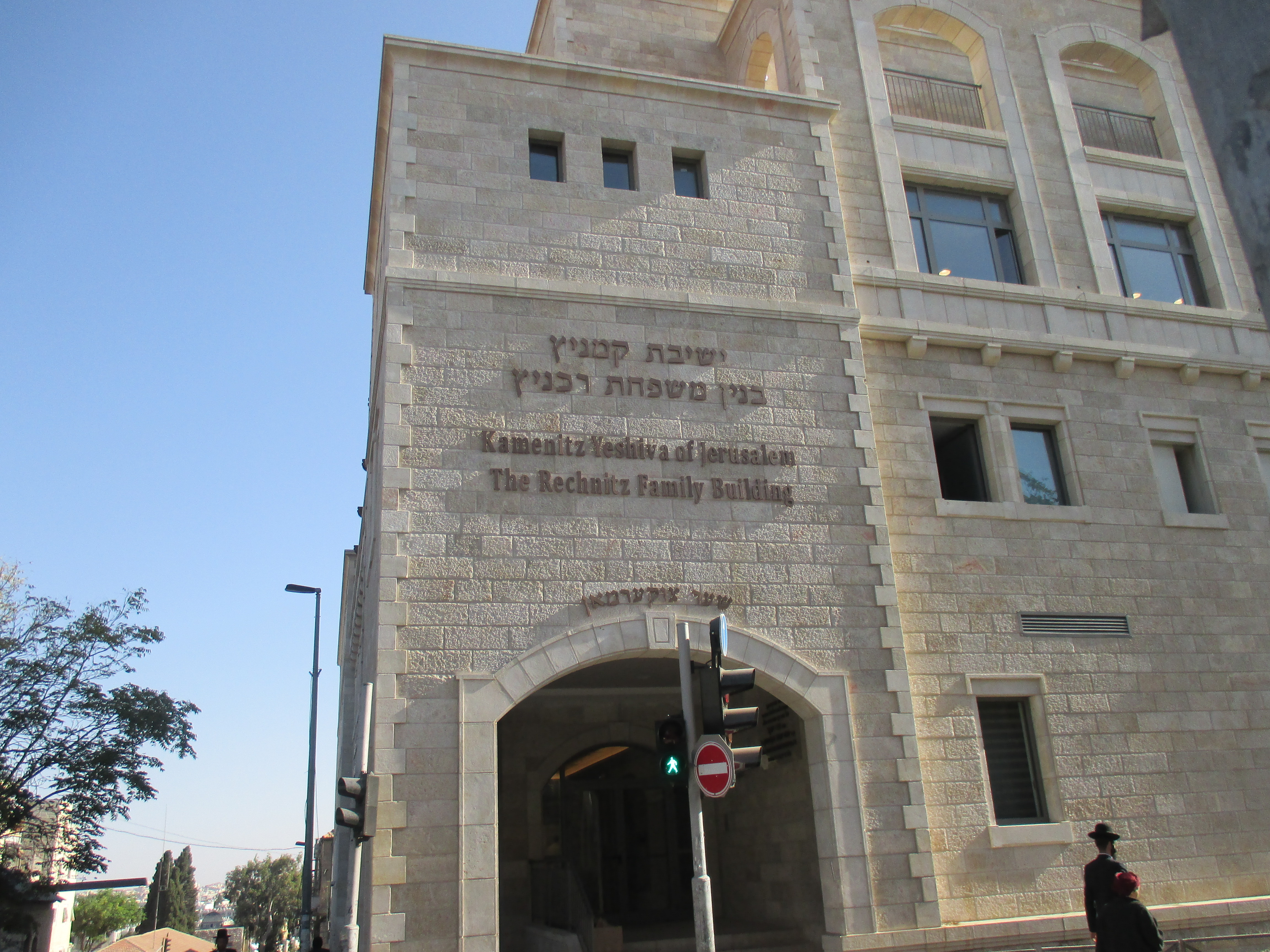
The Rechnitz building of the yeshiva in Jerusalem, donated by Shlomo Rechnitz.

Yeshivas Kaminetz (also known as Kaminetz Yeshiva) was founded 1945 in Jerusalem by a son and son-in-law of Boruch Ber Leibowitz as is a transplant of Yeshivas Knesses Beis Yitzchak-Kaminetz.

== History ==
Leibowitz was appointed head of Knesses Beis Yitzchak in 1904. During and after World War I it relocated more than once, including to Kaminetz in 1926. Leibowitz headed this yeshiva until his death in 1939. The yeshiva's students dispersed in four groups during World War II. Leibowitz's son-in-law Rabbi Moshe Bernstein, along with his brother-in-law Rabbi Yaakov Moshe Leibowitz, reestablished the school in Jerusalem in 1945. When Rabbi Elyah Lopian immigrated to Israel in 1950, he was appointed as the Mashgiach Ruchani of the yeshiva.

Yitzchok Scheiner, grandson-in-law to Boruch Ber, was succeeded Rabbi Leibowitz as Rosh Yeshuva until his own death in 2021.
