= Boruch Ber Leibowitz =

Belarusian rabbi (1862–1939)

Rabbi Boruch Ber Leibowitz
- ברוך בער לייבאוויץ
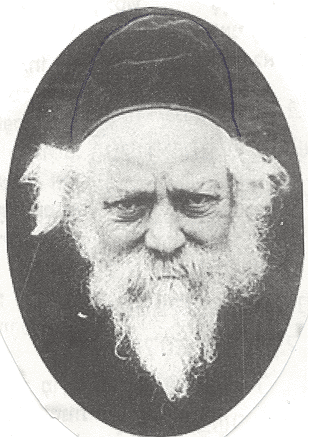

Personal life
- Born: 1862 Slutzk, Belarus
- Died: 1939 (aged 76–77) Rasein, Lithuania
- Buried: Vilna, Lithuania

Religious life
- Religion: Judaism
- Denomination: Orthodox Judaism

Jewish leader
- Predecessor: Rabbi Chaim Rabinowitz
- Position: Rosh yeshiva
- Yeshiva: Yeshivas Knesses Beis Yitzchak
- Main work: Birkas Shmuel
- Yahrtzeit: 'ה' כסלו תש

Boruch Ber Leibowitz (Yiddish: ברוך בער לייבאוויץ Hebrew: רב ברוך דוב ליבוביץ, romanized: Boruch Dov Libovitz; 1862 – November 17, 1939, (Note: 5 Kislev, 5700) known as Reb Boruch Ber, was a rabbi famed for his Talmudic lectures, particularly in that they were rooted styled in the method of his teacher Chaim Soloveitchik. He is known for leading Yeshivas Knesses Beis Yitzchak in Slabodka and Kaminetz.

== Biography ==
Boruch Dov Leibowitz was born in Slutsk and was known as a prodigy at a very young age. He was sent to learn in Volozhin yeshiva, where he quickly attached himself to his main teacher, Chaim Soloveitchik, striving to completely adopt his unique Talmudic approach, which was the foundation of the popular Brisker method.

He then married the daughter of Abraham Isaac Zimmerman, whom he succeeded as rabbi of Halusk. He also served as a pulpit rabbi for other communities. In 1904 he was appointed head of the Kneseth Beis Yitzchak Yeshiva in Slobodka. During World War I Leibowitz had to leave Slabodka and relocated the yeshiva to Minsk and then to Kremenchug and Vilna. In 1926 he re-established the yeshiva in Kaminetz, where it continued to attract hundreds of students for the next 13 years.

In May 1928, Boruch Ber traveled to America together with his son in law Reb Reuven Grozovsky to raise funds for his Yeshiva. New York City Mayor Jimmy Walker presented Boruch Ber with a symbolic key to the city. “Rabbi Leibowitz disproves Darwin’s Theory of Evolution,” exclaimed the Mayor. “Only a God could have created such a person!” While in the US, he visited cities from Philadelphia and Pittsburgh to Detroit and Boston as well as smaller Jewish enclaves such as Albany, NY and Harrisburg, PA. He also delivered a lecture at the national convention of the Agudath Harabanim in Belmar, NJ and at Rabbi Isaac Elchanan Theological Seminary

In 1939, shortly before his death, he fled with the yeshiva to a suburb of Vilna, hoping to escape from the Nazis and the communists. He is buried at the Zaretcha cemetery, Vilna. His grave was identified in 2012.

== Family ==
His daughter married Reb Reuven Grozovsky, who was rosh hayeshiva of Torah Vodaath in Brooklyn and Bais Medrash Elyon in Monsey

His nephew was Talmudical Rabbi Chaim Zimmerman of the Hebrew Theological College.

Rabbi Leibowitz's granddaughter (Rabbi Bernstein's daughter) married Rabbi Yitzchok Scheiner.

== Works ==
- Birkas Shmuel (The Blessing of Shmuel), his magnum opus, named in memory of his father, Shmuel David Leibowitz. This work includes many otherwise unrecorded teachings of Chaim Soloveitchik, as well as Leibowitz's novel understandings of Torah topics on the Talmud published from his manuscripts by his nephew and longtime student, Chaim Shalom Leibowitz.
- Shiurei Reb Baruch Ber (Lectures of Reb Boruch Ber) - recorded and published by his students.
