= David Bigman =

American-Israeli rabbi

Rabbi David Bigman
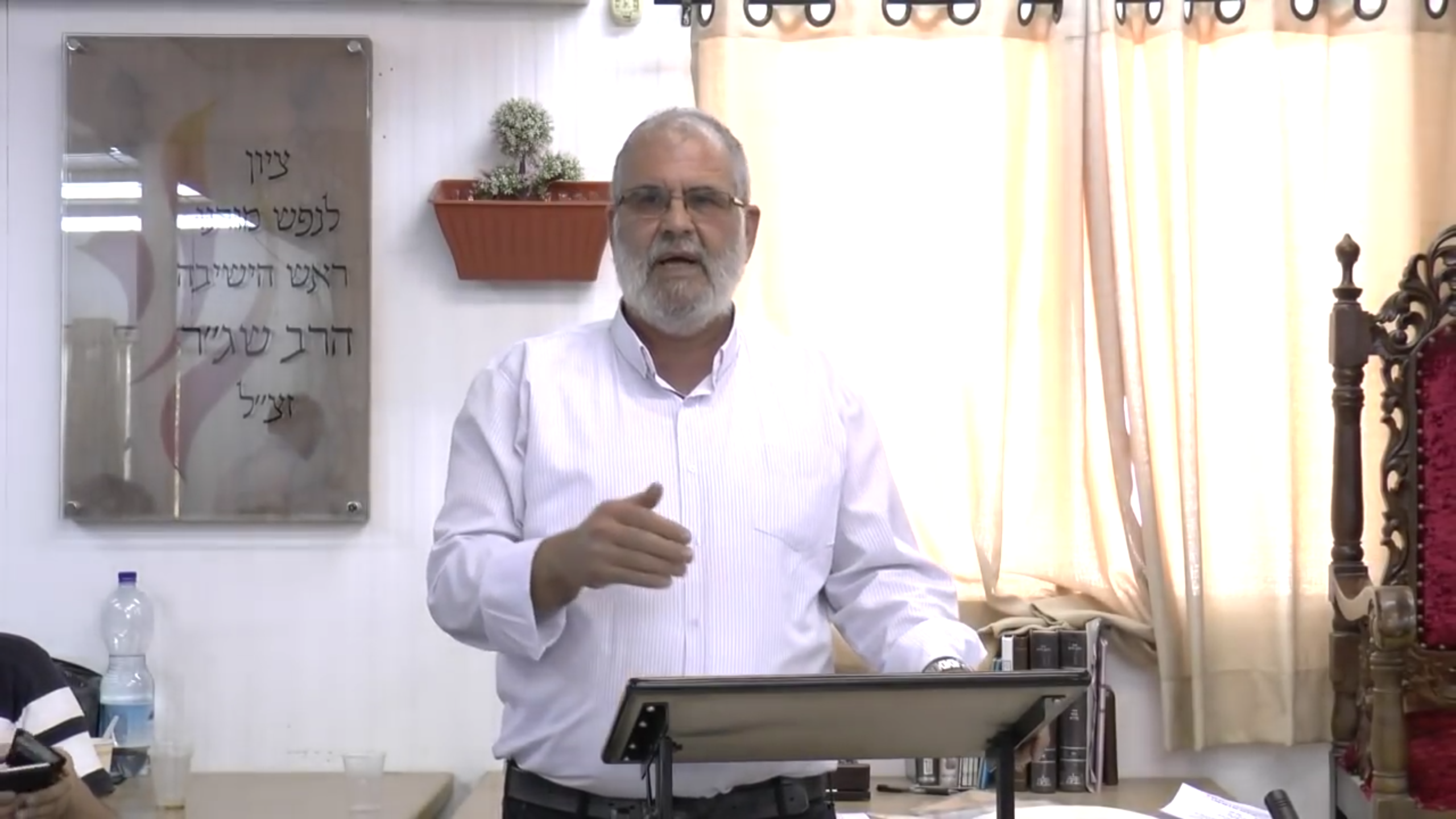
- Rabbi David Bigman
- Title: Rabbi

Personal life
- Born: 1954 (age 71–72) Detroit, Michigan, United States
- Spouse: Ariela Bigman

Religious life
- Religion: Judaism
- Denomination: Orthodox Judaism

Jewish leader
- Position: Rosh Yeshiva
- Yeshiva: Skokie Yeshiva; Mercaz HaRav

Rabbi David Bigman (Hebrew: דיוויד ביגמן; born 1953) is a Modern Orthodox Rabbi. Bigman is the president of Yeshivat Ma'ale Gilboa. He previously served as the head of the Yeshiva along with Rabbis Yehuda Gilad and Shmuel Reiner. He helped found the Ein Hanatziv Midrasha for girls and used to head the Ein Tzurim Yeshiva. Bigman developed the Revadim (“layers “) technique for the study of Talmud, combining traditional learning methods with academic research tools.

== Biography ==
Bigman was born in Detroit, Michigan. He studied under Rabbi Ahron Soloveichik at the Hebrew Theological College, better known as the Skokie Yeshiva, and then under Rabbi Aryeh Leib Bakst. After moving to Israel he studied at the Netzach Israel, Kerem B'Yavneh and Merkaz HaRav yeshiva programs. He received his Rabbinic ordination from the Ariel Institute in Haifa.

Bigman completed his B.A. in Economics with honors at Wayne State University. He moved to Israel in 1976, served in the Israel Defense Forces (IDF), and joined Ma'ale Gilboa, of the Religious Kibbutz Movement.

Bigman served as the rabbi of Kibbutz Ma'ale Gilboa between 1982 and 1986. From 1986 to 1993 he was the head of the Yeshivat HaKibbutz HaDati in Ein Tzurim. Since its opening in 1993 until 2024, Bigman was the head of Yeshivat Ma'ale Gilboa. As of fall 2024, he has transitioned into the role of President of Yeshivat Ma'ale Gilboa to make room for Rabbi Yossi Gamliel to join the head leadership team, though he still actively teaches in the yeshiva. Bigman was also active in opening the Ein HaNetziv program for girls.

Over the years Bigman taught in many places, in Israel and the United States, including the Pardes Institute of Jewish Studies, the Drisha Institute and Yeshivat Hadar. In 2012 Bigman joined Beit Hillel, a group of Modern Orthodox Israeli rabbis working to create a more engaged spiritual leadership.

== Teachings and legacy ==
Bigman believes Torah study must be done out of sense of commitment to the teachings and traditions of Halakha (Jewish rabbinical law), but also through listening to current voices and ideas, and openly welcomes a plurality of ideas and voices in his study. This approach is evident in his Talmudic teaching technique, which seeks to understand the diversity of the Talmud's voices based on its sources and layers.

Bigman is known for his involvement in issues of social justice, such as work for married women who are Agunot and 'chained' to their marriage and for women who are refused a Get - the Jewish divorce document - by their husbands. In this capacity, he currently serves as the Av Beit Din (Chief Justice) of the International Beit Din, where advanced legal techniques and solutions are employed to free women who are agunot. He has also issued lenient religious rulings regarding the singing of women. In addition to his rabbinic work, Bigman has been involved in groups promoting social justice. He is considered to be among the more Liberal-minded Modern Orthodox rabbis in Israel, is involved in inter-faith dialogue groups and sits on the board of the Elijah Interfaith Institute.

=== Views on revelation ===
In a 2014 series of essays published on TheTorah.com, Bigman argued that the view that the entire Torah was dictated to Moses, with all of its verses equal in status, originated as a fully formed principle with Maimonides rather than in earlier rabbinic literature. He proposed instead that the Torah comprises different literary genres reflecting "diverse facets of revelation", and wrote that "there is no other option but to let go of the narrative of the dictation", while affirming "the exalted and binding status of the Torah". He described the methods of modern biblical scholarship as useful interpretive tools for the student of Torah, while holding that they "cannot evaluate the revelation in our holy Torah". In a 2015 essay on the Exodus, he wrote that "our relationship to Torah is not based on asserting its factual historicity".

In a June 2017 article in the American edition of Yated Ne'eman, Rabbi Avrohom Gordimer argued that Bigman's essays on revelation and the Exodus constituted heresy under Maimonides' principles of faith, and that the rulings of the International Beit Din, on which Bigman sits, were therefore invalid.

== Books ==
- The Fire and the Cloud. Contemporary Reflections on the Weekly Torah Reading, the Gefen Publishing Company, 2011.

== Additional reading ==
- Rabbi Bigman's Zionism: Admiration and Reservation, Ross Singer, on The Times of Israel
