= Hebrew Theological College =

Yeshiva in Skokie, Illinois, United States

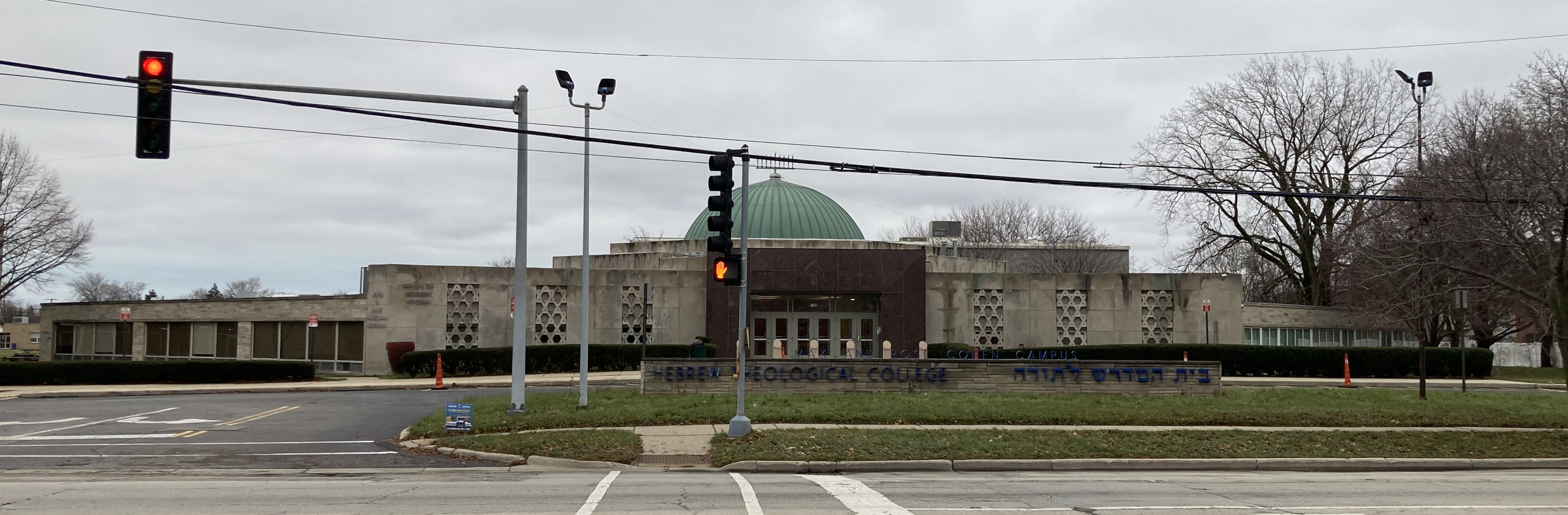
- Type: Private Yeshiva
- Established: October 15, 1921; 104 years ago
- Rosh HaYeshiva: Moshe Revah
- Students: 145 high school 50 men's college 165 women's college
- Location: Skokie, Illinois, United States
- Campus: Suburban
- Website: www.htc.edu

The Hebrew Theological College, known colloquially as "Skokie Yeshiva" or HTC, is a yeshiva in Skokie, Illinois. Although the school's primary focus is the teaching of Torah and Jewish tradition, it is also a private university that is part of the Touro University System which hosts separate programs for men and women. Founded as a Modern Orthodox institution, it has evolved to include students from Haredi and Hasidic backgrounds.

== History and mission ==
Hebrew Theological College (HTC) was founded in 1921 in the city of Chicago by Chaim Tzvi Rubinstein (1872–1944) and Saul Silber (1876–1946). Rubinstein, an alumnus of Volozhin Yeshiva, had arrived in the United States in 1917; Silber, a pulpit rabbi in Chicago, served as president of the school for its first 25 years. They were followed by Oscar Z. Fasman, who served during 1946–1964, Simon G. Kramer (1964–1970), and Irving J. Rosenbaum. Don Well was president from 1981 to 1989, followed by Jerold Isenberg from 1989 to 2013. Shmuel Leib Schuman became interim chief executive officer (CEO) in 2013.

HTC's original location was at 3448 West Douglas Boulevard in the North Lawndale community. It later moved to Skokie, a northern suburb of Chicago, in 1958.

Throughout its history, HTC's leadership has been shared by its rosh yeshiva and CEO—formerly known as the president and subsequently as the chancellor.

HTC was founded as a Modern Orthodox institution of higher education. It has since evolved to include students from Haredi and Hasidic backgrounds. The school's primary purpose is to prepare students for the assumption of formal roles as educators, as well as to train eligible students to meet the requirements and demands of semikhah (rabbinical ordination). As its secondary purpose, it endeavors to provide its students with broad cultural perspectives and a strong background in the liberal arts and sciences to facilitate a creative synthesis of general and Jewish knowledge. In so doing, the college also provides a foundation for the pursuit of advanced professional training.

== Organization ==
The yeshiva consists of a beth midrash (rabbinical school); the Bellows Kollel, with some of the kollel members studying for semikhah in a program led by Chaim Twerski; the Blitstein Institute for Women; and the Fasman Yeshiva High School. The college is composed of the Bressler School of Advanced Hebrew Studies and the Kanter School of Liberal Arts and Sciences. All students complete a Bachelor of Arts in Judaic Studies through the Bressler School, with the option of a second major through the Kanter School.

The men's program offers a B.A. with a focus in Judaic studies and specifically Talmud, with second majors offered in Business, Accounting, and Psychology. The woman's program, located on a separate campus at the Blistein Institute for Women, offers Judaic Studies majors in Bible, Hebrew Language, and Jewish History, with dual majors available in Business, Computer and Information Sciences, Education (including Elementary and Special Education), English, Health Sciences and Psychology.

The college is accredited by the North Central Association of Colleges and Schools.

== Notable people ==
=== Roshei yeshiva ===
Nissan Yablonsky, an alumnus of Slabodka, served as the first rosh yeshiva for the first few years, followed by Chaim Korb. Chaim Zimmerman served as rosh yeshiva from 1947 to 1966.

Simon Kramer was appointed president. Under his stewardship, HTC reached its highest enrollment with approximately 300 students in the high school and 200 in the college. Aaron Soloveichik became rosh yeshiva in 1966, but after being forced out in 1974, he founded Yeshivas Brisk in Chicago. In 1985, Shlomo Morgenstern, an alumnus of Hebron Yeshiva, became rosh yeshiva, serving in that position for 22 years. On January 27, 2008, Avraham Friedman was named rosh yeshiva.

Other roshei yeshiva included:

- Yosef Babad
- Nachman Barr
- Avrahom Yitzchok Cordon
- Eliezer Y. Gottleib,
- Yaakov Greenberg
- Moshe Hershler
- Dovid Kaganoff
- Hirsch Isenberg
- Herzel Kaplan
- Yisrael Mendel Kaplan
- Chaim Kreiswirth
- Chaim Gronim Lando
- Yosef Leff
- Yechezkel Lichtman
- Dovid Lifshitz
- Chaim Mednick
- Elazar Muskin
- Chaim Dovid Regensberg
- Mordechai Rogow
- Chaim Zvi Rubenstein
- Nachum Sachs
- Yitzchak Sender
- Zelig Starr
- Zvi Teller
- Moshe Wernick

=== Faculty ===
Notable faculty include the rosh yeshiva, Avraham Friedman. Notable past members of the faculty include Eliezer Berkovits, chairman of the department of Jewish philosophy from 1958 until 1967, and Yaakov Perlow, the Novominsker Rebbe, Chaver Moetzes Gedolei HaTorah in America.

=== Alumni ===
- David Applebaum
- David Bigman, rosh yeshivat Ma'ale Gilboa
- Charles Ber Chavel
- Nosson Tzvi Finkel, rosh yeshiva, Mir Jerusalem
- Moshe Gottesman, rabbi, educator and community leader
- Yehiel Mark Kalish, member of the Illinois General Assembly, 16th House District
- Menachem Kellner
- Moshe Kletenik, Av Beis Din Seattle
- Moses Mescheloff
- Don Patinkin (1922–1995), Israeli-American economist, and President of the Hebrew University of Jerusalem
- Abraham J. Twerski, Hasidic rabbi and psychiatrist
- Berel Wein, rabbi, lecturer and writer
- Chaim Zimmerman

== See also ==
- List of Jewish universities and colleges in the United States
- Bar-Ilan University
- Lander College for Men
- Jerusalem College of Technology
- Yeshiva University
- History of the Jews in Chicago
