= Hlusk district =

District of Mogilev region, Belarus

Hlusk district Глускі раён (Belarusian)
- District
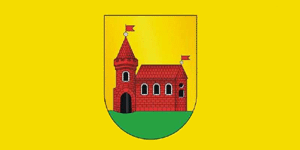
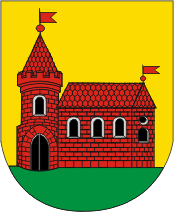
- Flag Coat of arms

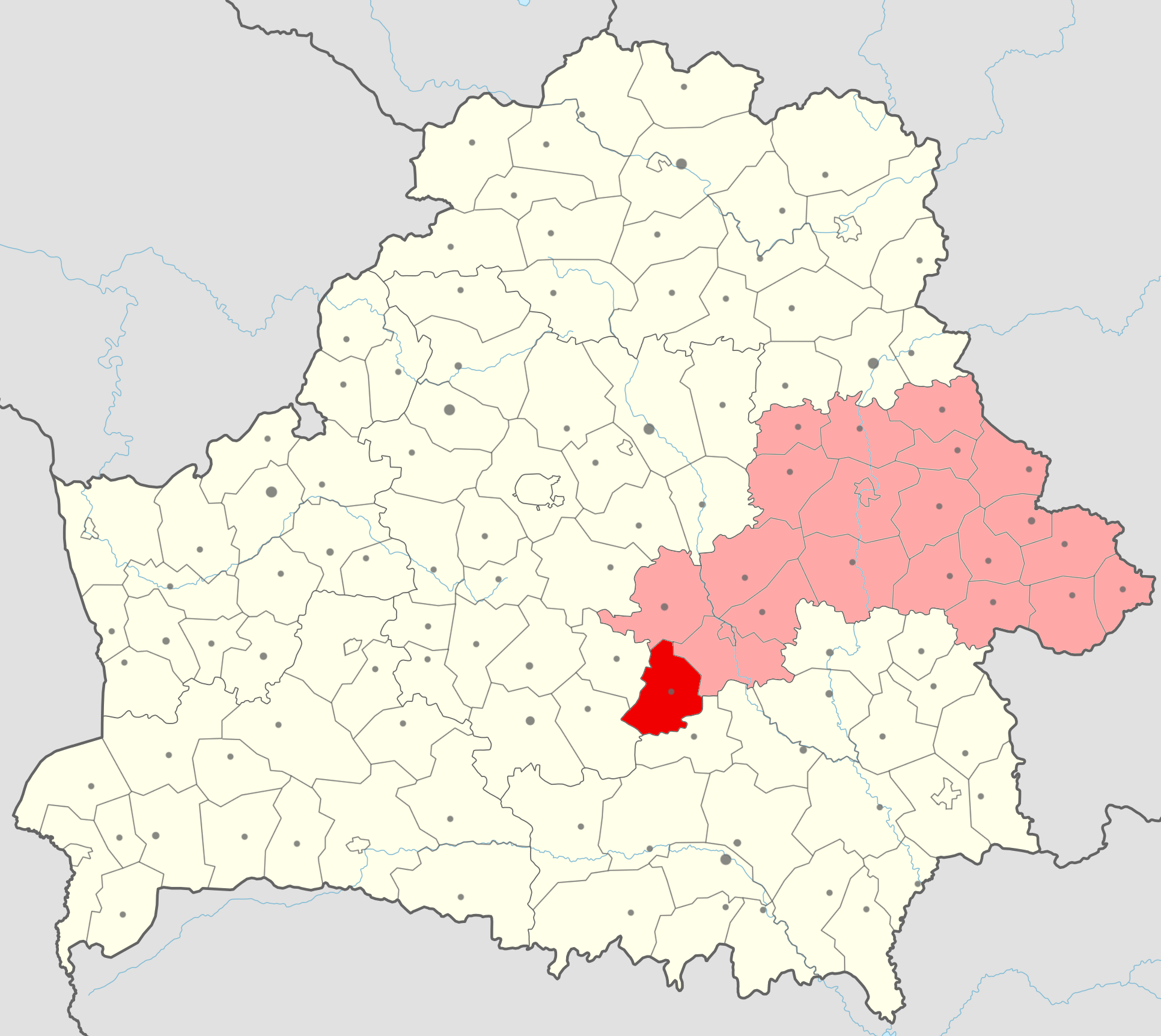
- Coordinates: 52°53′28″N 28°41′19″E
- Country: Belarus
- Region: Mogilev region
- Administrative center: Hlusk

Government
  - Chairman of the District Executive Committee: Vladimir Kniga

Area
  - Total: 1,335.44 km^{2} (515.62 sq mi)
- Elevation: 149 m (489 ft)

Population (2023)
  - Total: 12,408
  - Density: 9.2913/km^{2} (24.064/sq mi)
- Time zone: UTC+3 (MSK)

Hlusk district (Belarusian: Глускі раён; Russian: Глусский район, romanized: Glussky rayon) is a district (raion) of Mogilev region in Belarus. The administrative center is the urban-type settlement of Hlusk. As of 2009, its population was 16,457. The population of Hlusk accounts for 45.0% of the district's population.
