= Tower of Kamyenyets =

Tower in Kamyenyets, Belarus

Coordinates: 52°24′17.15″N 23°49′10.28″E

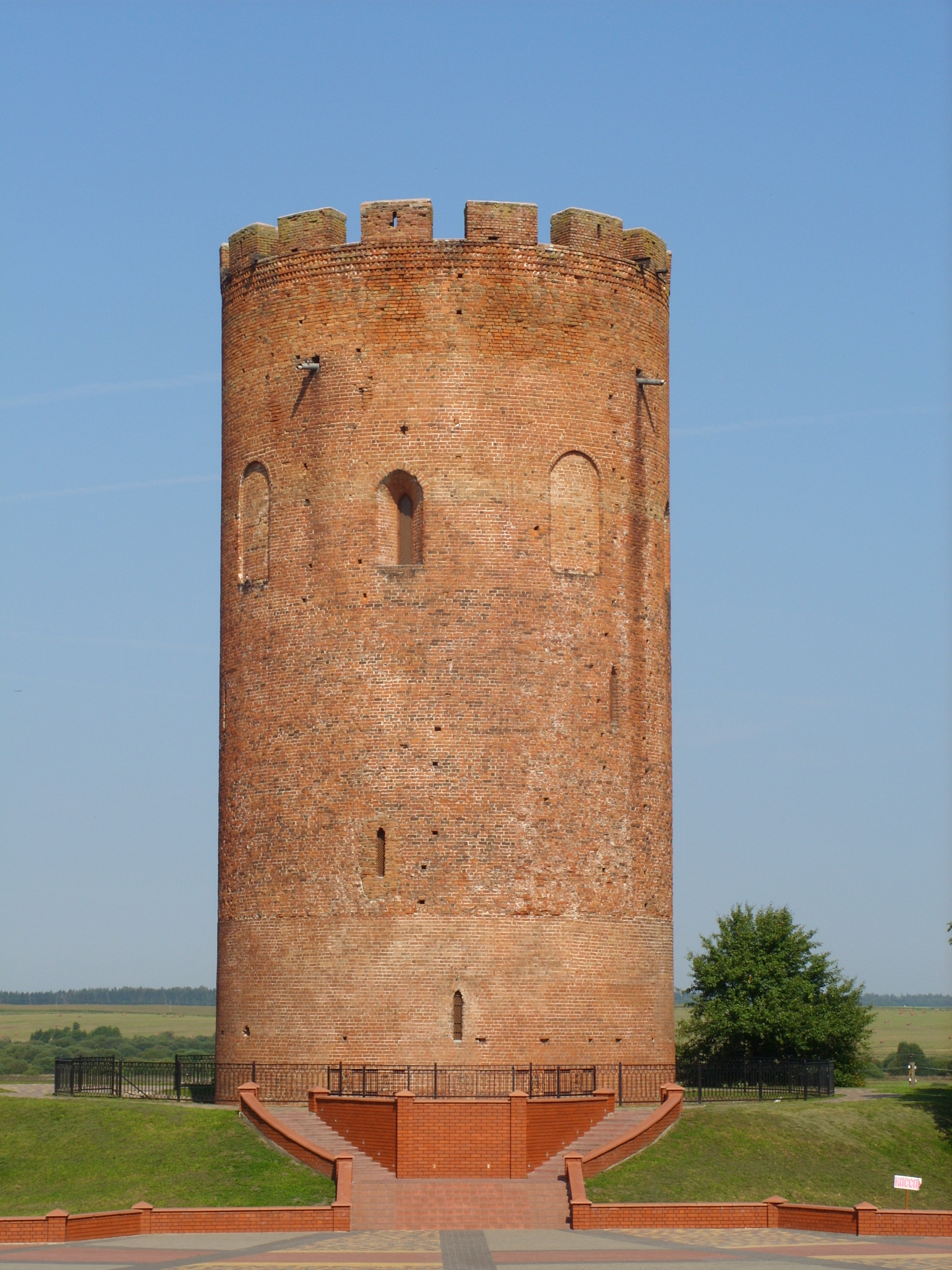
The tower of Kamyenyets today

The Tower of Kamyenyets (Belarusian: Камянецкая вежа; Russian: Каменецкая башня), also called the White Tower (Belarusian: Белая вежа, romanized: Bielaya vieža), is the main landmark of the town of Kamyenyets in Belarus. The name Bielaja Vieža (alternative transliteration: Belaya Vezha), which literally means White Tower or White Fortress in Belarusian, presumably derives from the tower's proximity to the Belavezhskaya Pushcha Forest, but not from its color, which has been brick-red through the ages, never white.

The first record in the chronicles about the foundation of the tower dates from 1276. Erected between 1271 and 1289 by the architect Oleksa as a frontier stronghold on the northern border of the Principality of Volhynia, it is the only such tower remaining to this day in Belarus. (Once similar towers were built in Brest, Grodno, Turaw, Navahradak, but they were destroyed in the course of wars.)

Today it is a national historic site. Standing atop a gentle rise overlooking the Liasnaja river, the tower is the main landmark of Kamyenyets today. Since 1960 the tower houses a branch of the Brest regional museum. On January 30, 2004, the site was added to the UNESCO World Heritage Tentative List, in the Cultural category, but in 2015 it was removed from the list.

== Foundation ==
Drawing by Napoleon Orda, 1876

The advantageous location on the stony steep bank of the Liasnaja River for the construction of the frontier stronghold, a castle with a keep on the northern border of Volhynia principality was found by Oleksa. Vladimir Vasilkovich, the prince of Volhynia, liked the place and ordered Oleksa to build the castle.

== Layout ==
The castle was built as an enclosed community. Like many European castles, it had a great round tower, on the raised mound (motte), enclosed by a moat and the river on the northern side, and an adjoining enclosure (bailey), that was completely destroyed in 1903. This type of the motte-and-bailey castle appeared in the 10th and 11th centuries between the Rhine and Loire rivers and eventually spread to most of Western Europe and even to the area of the present Belarus. The red-brick tower with service and residential rooms on 5 levels inside was actually a donjon or a keep, that was quite common in France and England till the 16th century. It is 30 meters (98 ft) high, the redbrick walls are about 2.5 m (8.2 ft) thick, with a pitched roof at the top.

=== Brickwork ===
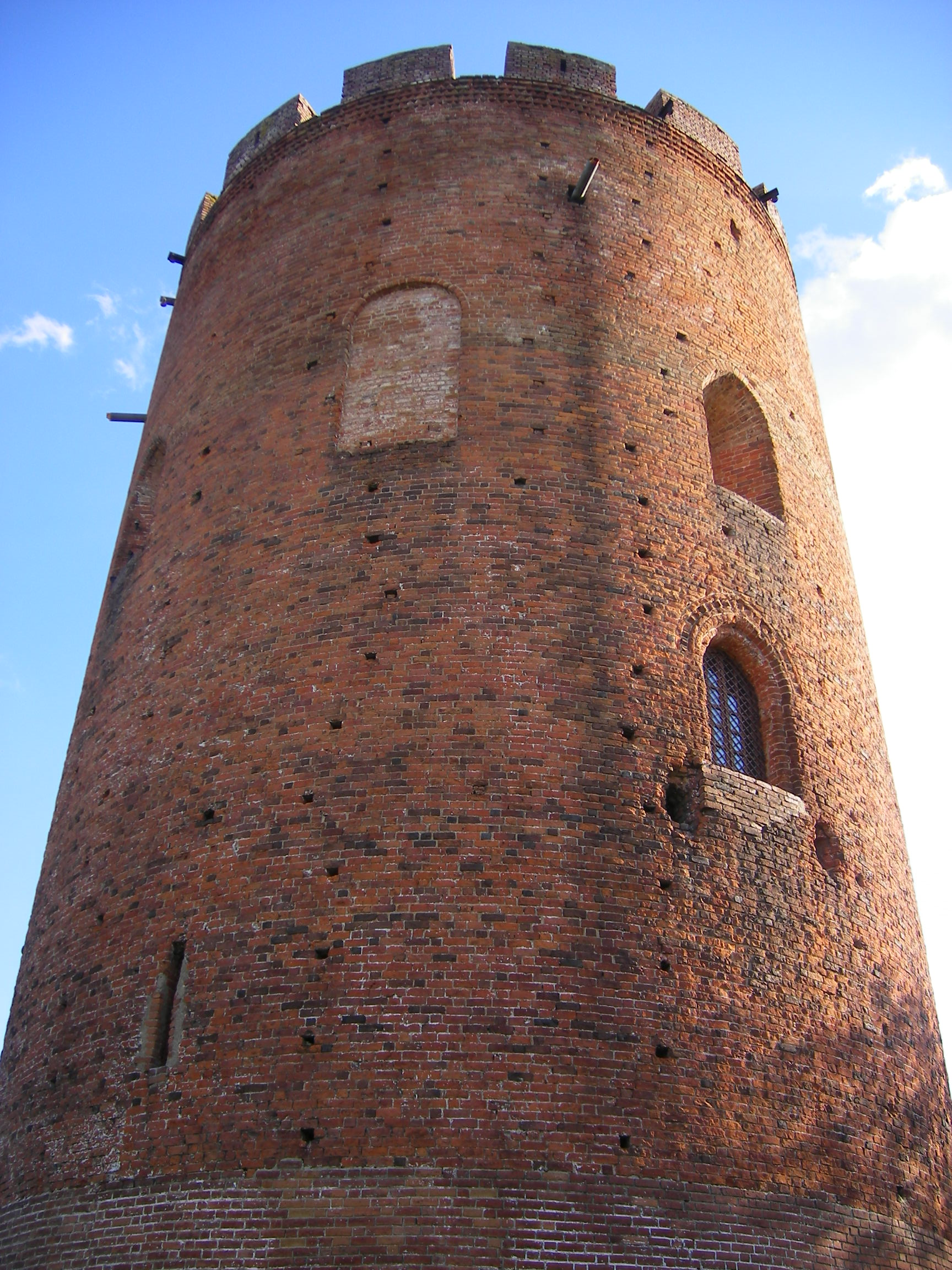
A closeup of the brickwork

The tower was entirely built of brick. Brick construction was rarely used in this part of Europe until the end of the Middle Ages, because of cost. Till the 16th century mostly rubbleworks prevailed in fortifications and churches and monasteries, only some parts of exterior were built of brick. The tower traces the influence of Western Europe, where brickwork was used extensively in the late 13th – early 14th century.

Unlike the narrow loopholes on lower levels, the pointed big lancet windows and niches on the upper floor are an excellent example of early Gothic architecture in Belarus. The openings of the windows and niches were plastered and whitewashed. The windows were designed to permit the entry of light into the apartments, where the nobility used to live during sieges. Glass windows was another contribution to Gothic architecture. It is apparent that the residents were eager to make themselves at home in the keep. The upper part of the tower was furnished with battlements and a pattern of surface modeling of the brickwork, several nice ring dog tooth courses running below the battlements.

The brickwork features a peculiar Baltic bond: a course consists of 2 stretchers and 1 header. Some bricks on the exterior were damaged or dismantled by the local peasants, the brickwork was repaired in 1903 while the archeological excavations were going on around the tower. 10,000 bricks were used for the work.
