= Yosef Babad (1905–1997) =

American rabbi and scholar

Yosef (Joseph) Babad (1905 – August 30, 1997) was an American rabbi and scholar. A prominent member of the Chicago Jewish community, he was a professor of Bible and Jewish Literature at Hebrew Theological College in Skokie, Illinois, where he was also the dean of students and dean of the graduate school for 40 years. He wrote an authoritative book on the history of the Jews in Medieval Carinthia in Austria.

== Biography ==
Babad was born in 1905 in Lubaczów, Poland. He was the scion of a rabbinic family tracing lineage to the 11th century and a direct descendant of the famed author of the Minchat Chinuch, after whom he was named. Rabbi Babad received a doctorate of philosophy from the University of Vienna in 1933, and rabbinic ordination from the Rabbinical Seminary of Vienna in 1934.

He served as a district rabbi of the Carinthian Jewish community of Klagenfurt, in the Austrian Alps. In 1939, Babad moved to the Netherlands, where he worked with the Vaad Hatzalah facilitating Jews in their escape from Nazi Germany.

During the 1940s, Babad served as a congregational rabbi in Tarentum, PA and Washington, Pa. He attended the University of Pittsburgh, earning a master's degree in English literature in 1943. He joined the Hebrew Theological College in 1944, serving as a professor of Bible and Hebrew literature, and as dean of students and Graduate School Dean for 40 years. He retired in 1984, and at the age of 70, moved to Israel. According to his student, Rabbi Stewart Weiss, he said he is making an aliyah because:

I can no longer watch from afar as our brothers in Israel daily risk their lives for our future, and not be a part of them, and so, I am fulfilling what must be the destiny of every Jew."

Babad died in Jerusalem on August 30, 1997.

== Works ==
Babad authored various articles in scholarly publications on Jewish philosophy and history in Hebrew, German and English. He also published an authoritative work on the history of Jews in medieval Carinthia and on Averroes, a contemporary of Maimonides. He provided testimony on pre-Holocaust Austrian Jewry for Yad Vashem, the Holocaust Memorial in Jerusalem, and published a study on "Halacha and Aggadah in [the] Septuagint." His articles include:

- “The Jews in Medieval Carinthia. A contribution to the history of the Jews in the Alpine countries of Europe", Historia Judaica Vol VII, No 1, April 1945.
- "אבן רשד בן דורו של הרמב"ם","Ibn Rushd ben Doro Shel Harambam", Jubilee book in honor of Samuel K. Mirsky, New York, 1959, pp. 43–74.
- "המעמדים בקארינטיה של אוסטריה דורשים כניסת היהודים לטובת ארצם","The Estates in the Carinthian Province of Austria Request Readmission of Jews in 1783 for Economic Reasons", in Hagut Ivrit Ba'Amerika, Studies on Jewish Themes by Contemporary American Scholars, Edited by Dr. Menahem Zohori, Prof. Arie Tartakover, Dr. Haim Ormian, Published by Brit-Ivrit Olamit, Volume III, 1974, pp. 101–112
