= Yitzchok Scheiner =

Israeli–American rabbi (1922–2021)

Rabbi Yitzchok Scheiner יצחק שיינר
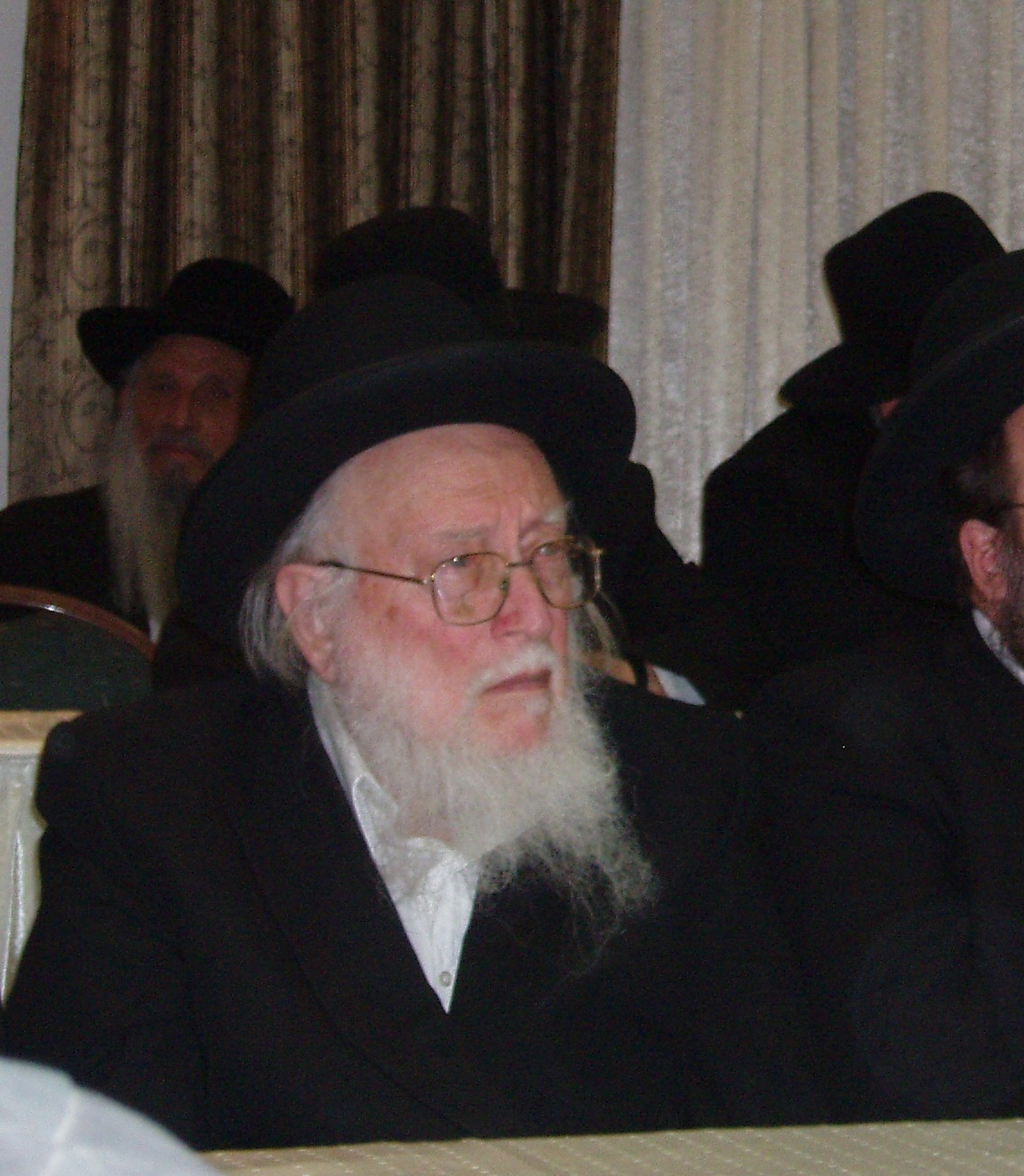
- Title: Rosh yeshiva

Personal life
- Born: May 11, 1922 Pittsburgh, Pennsylvania, U.S.
- Died: January 31, 2021 (aged 98) Jerusalem, Israel
- Education: Yeshiva Torah Vodaas; Rabbi Isaac Elchanan Theological Seminary (RIETS)

Religious life
- Religion: Judaism
- Yeshiva: Kamenitz yeshiva

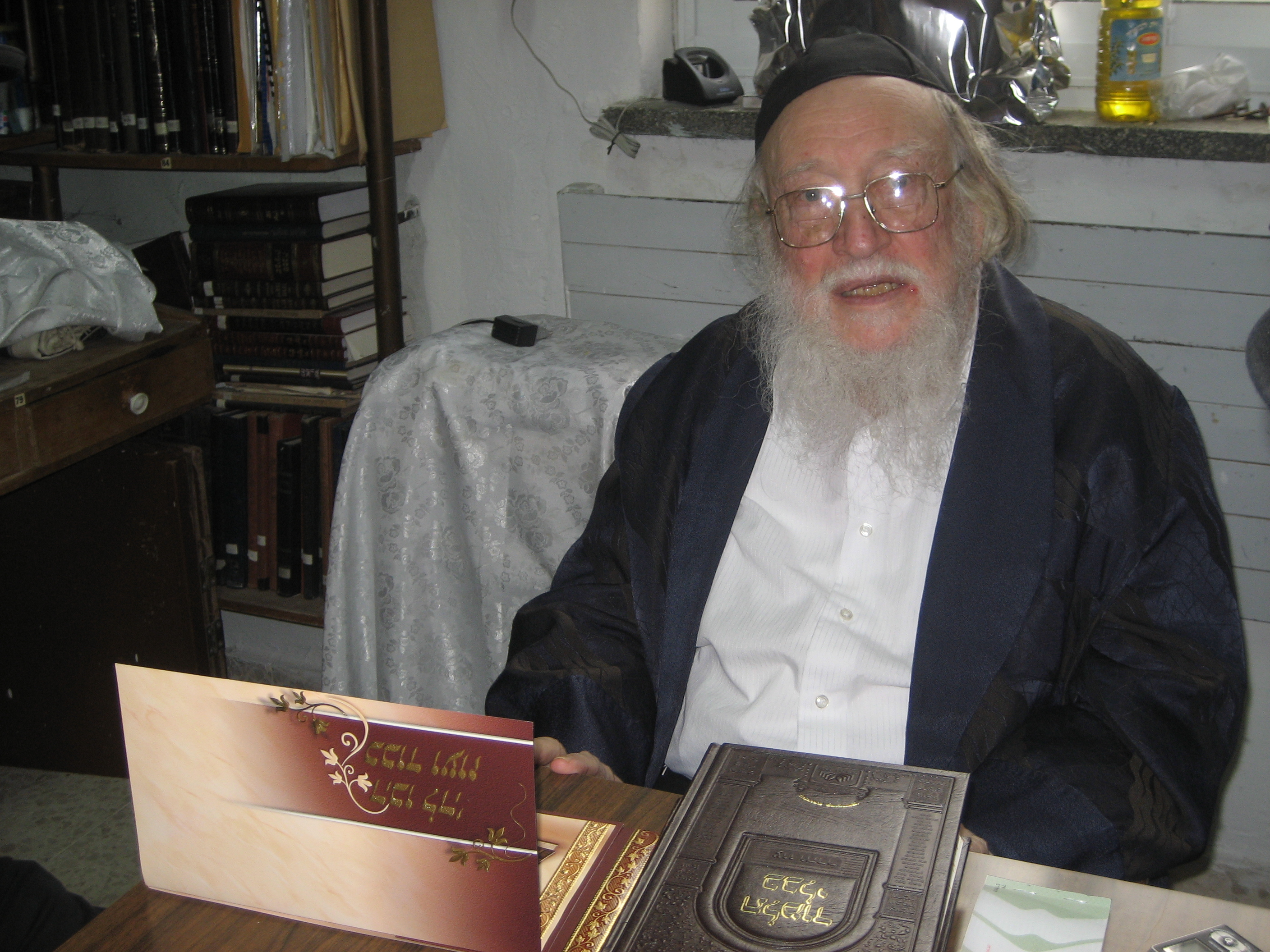
Rabbi Scheiner in 2007

Rabbi Yitzchok Scheiner (Hebrew: יצחק שיינר; November 5, 1922 – January 31, 2021) was an Israeli–American rabbi who was the rosh yeshiva of the Kamenitz yeshiva of Jerusalem.

== Early life and education ==
He was born in May 1922 in Pittsburgh to immigrants from Poland. He graduated Peabody High School in 1938. Rabbi Avraham Bender was visiting Pittsburgh at that time, and he convinced Scheiner's parents to send their son to yeshiva in New York. During the 1940s, he studied at Yeshiva College (Yeshivas Rabbenu Yitzchok Elchonon) and at Yeshiva Torah Vodaas under Rabbi Shlomo Heiman.

== Career ==
During the 1960s, he taught at a Yeshiva in Montreux, Switzerland.

After the death of his father-in-law (who was the rosh yeshiva of the Kamenitz yeshiva in Jerusalem), Rabbi Scheiner headed the yeshiva alongside his brother-in-law. After the death of his brother-in-law in 1998, Rabbi Scheiner served as the central rosh yeshiva with his brother-in-law's son at his side. Rabbi Scheiner's two sons and his son-in-law also teach at the yeshiva.

In the 1990s, he became a member of the Moetzes Gedolei HaTorah of Degel HaTorah.

== Personal life ==
Toward the end of the 1940s, he married a granddaughter of Rabbi Boruch Ber Leibowitz. His wife died in 2007. He lived in the Kerem Avraham neighborhood in Jerusalem.

Scheiner died from COVID-19 during the COVID-19 pandemic in Israel on 31 January 2021, at the age of 98. His death occurred just hours after that of Rabbi Meshulam Dovid Soloveitchik. An estimated 8,000 mourners attended Scheiner's Jerusalem burial.
