= Vladimir Vasilkovich =

Saint Volodymyr Vasylkovych
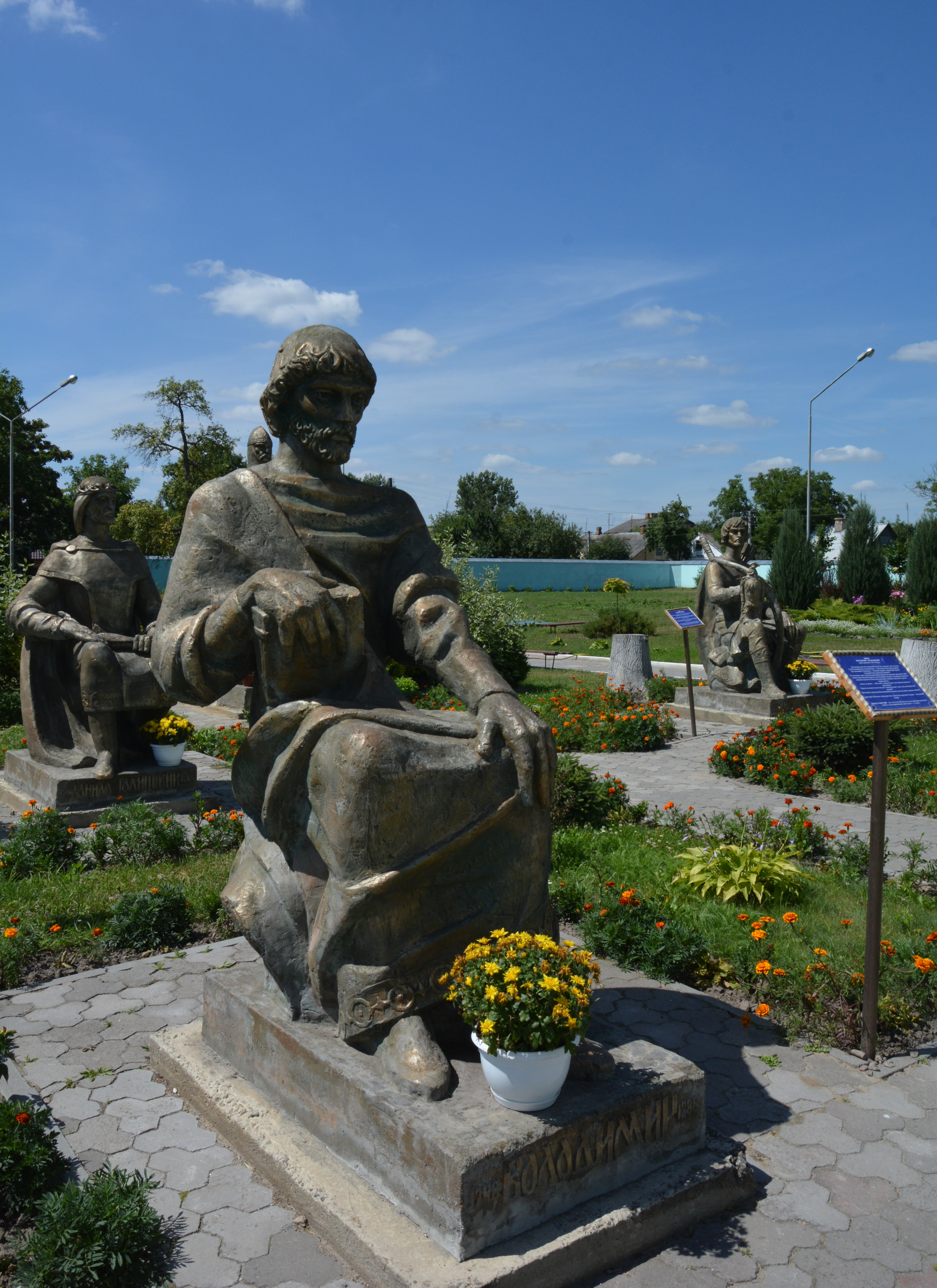
- Monument to Volodymyr Vasylkovych on the premises of the Assumption Cathedral in Volodymyr

Right-believing prince
- Born: c. 1248
- Died: December 10, 1288 (aged 39–40); Liuboml
- Venerated in: Orthodox Church of Ukraine
- Canonized: 2012
- Feast: 23 October, 23 December

Prince of Volhynia
- Reign: 1269–1288
- Predecessor: Vasilko Romanovich
- Successor: Mstislav Danylovich

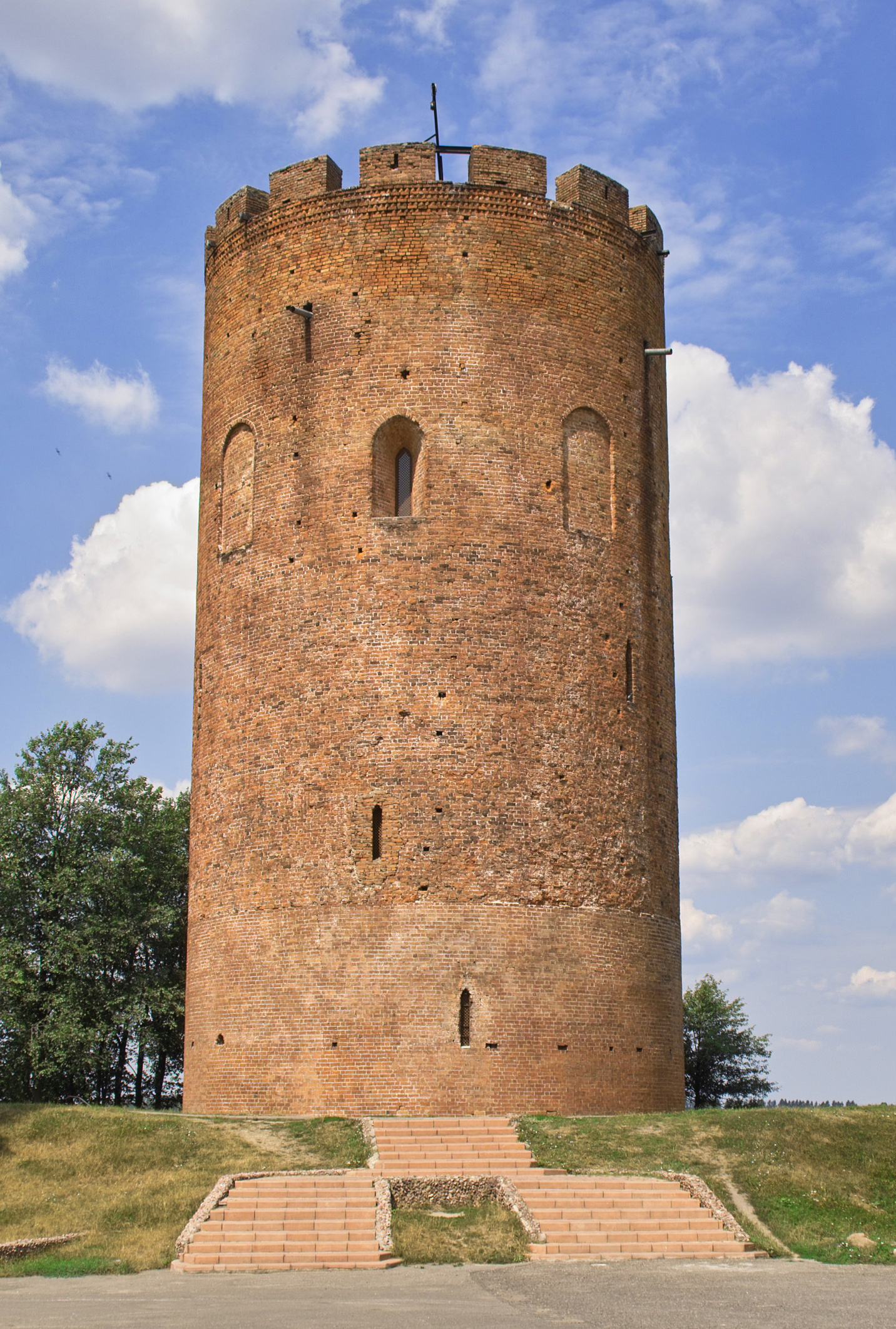
Tower of Kamianiets built under the rule of Vladimir Vasilkovich

Vladimir Vasilkovich or Volodymyr Vasylkovych (Old Ruthenian: Володимерь, Володимѣръ; Ukrainian: Володимир Василькович) was a son of Vasilko Romanovich. He succeeded his father as the prince of Volhynia when the latter died in 1269, and was famous for numerous constructions and reconstructions of town fortifications in Volhynia.

== Biography ==
The Galician-Volhynian Chronicle described Volodymyr Vasylkovych as a tall man with curly yellow hair, beautiful appearance and shaved beard. He was reported to have avoided drinking alcohol, possessed a gentle character and was a skilled hunter.

A nephew of Daniel Romanovich, Volodymyr headed the Principality of Volhynia after the death of his father in 1269 and established his residence in Liuboml. During his rule, Volodymyr subdued the tribes of Yotvingians and engaged in wars against Lithuanians, Poles and Hungarians. He was known as a patron of religion, and gifted one of the churches in his capital 34 books with valuable decorations. Volodymyr was married to Olga, the daughter of the prince of Bryansk, and had a stepdaughter called Iziaslava. In the 1270s (1276, according to most sources) he founded a castle that included a keep now famous as the Tower of Kamyanets, and around which sprang up the town of Kamyanets; he also authored the construction of a similar tower in the re-built castle of Berestye.

In 1284 Volodymyr fell ill with a sickness, which affected his lower lip and jaw, leading to loss of teeth. His suffering, compared to the one of Job, was attributed to leprosy. Despite this, the prince continued to lead an active life, walking and riding horse. Feeling that death was close, he took communion, but refused to tonsure himself as a monk, as was common among many rulers. After fasting for a week, on 10 December 1288 Volodymyr died in Liuboml. According to Gregory Minh, professor of Kyiv University, who studied Volodymyr's remains in 1886, the cause of the prince's death was cancer, although another hypothesis claims that he died of osteomyelitis caused by an infected tooth.

After his death, the prince's body was adorned with embroidered velvet and transported to Volodymyr on a sled. Upon arrival, his remains were placed in the city's Assumption Cathedral. Over 20,000 people, including representatives of the Jewish and German communities, as well as travellers from Novgorod and Surozh, attended the funeral procession, which was headed by Volodymyr bishop Eusygnius and Pechersk hegumen Agapit. Volodymyr was renowned for his favorable treatment of the region's Jewish population, which had erewhile been severely maligned and ill-treated. According to an annalist, "the Jews wept at his funeral as at the fall of Jerusalem, or when being led into the Babylonian captivity."

After the prince's death, his body was put into a coffin, but remained unburied, either because his body had been discovered to be incorrupt, which could be a ground for canonization, or because his cousin Mstislav Danylovich, who became his heir, couldn't attend the funeral. The burial finally took place on 6 April 1289, 118 days after the original ceremony.

== Legacy ==
Summing up his life, the "old chronicle" presented Volodymyr as a booklover and philosopher, whose like in the world had never before been seen, and would never be seen again.

In 2012 synod of the Ukrainian Orthodox Church - Kyiv Patriarchate canonized Volodymyr Vasylkovych as a right-believing prince.
