= Chaim Zimmerman =

Ukrainian-born American Orthodox rabbi

Aharon Chaim Zimmerman (1914 – March 9, 1995) (7th Adar II 5755) was a Ukrainian-born American Orthodox rabbi.

== Biography ==
Aharon Chaim Zimmerman was born in Konotop, Ukraine. He was the son of Rabbi Yaakov Moshe Zimmerman and nephew of Rabbi Baruch Ber Lebowitz. He was known as a child prodigy ("illui"). As a teenager, he studied at the Kaminetz Yeshiva headed by his uncle, Baruch Ber Lebowitz. He left Russia at age 15 with his father, and immigrated to the U.S.

== Rabbinic career ==
Zimmerman received rabbinical ordination from Rabbi Moshe Soloveitchik in 1939. His first published work, "Binyan Halakha", contains a letter of approbation from the Chief Rabbi of Eretz Israel, Rabbi Yitzchak Halevi Herzog, attesting that the young author was "fully knowledgeable in the entire Talmud Bavli and Yerushalmi, Rishonim, and Achronim".

He served as Rosh Yeshiva of Hebrew Theological College in Chicago until 1964, and later a Rosh Yeshiva in New York City and in Jerusalem. He immigrated to Israel in 1972. He died on March 9, 1995. (7th Adar II 5755)

He published several books on Halacha and Philosophy. He was renowned as a genius in Torah learning, and was also well versed in mathematics, physics, and philosophy. In the early 1950s, when the halachic status of the "international dateline" was the subject of considerable debate, he published his best known work, "Agan HaSahar". He is said to have considered that precious few could understand his work, and printed a very limited edition of only several hundred copies. The book today commands a rich premium from collectors, on the rare occasions when a copy becomes available for sale. His most famous disputant was Rav Menachem Kasher, whom he attacked vigorously in "Agan HaSahar", following Kasher's cavalier dismissal of his published opinions on the dateline controversy.

In his book Torah and Existence, he cogently argues that the purpose of the world revolves around Torah. The first chapter contains an elaboration of his opinion that the founding of the modern State of Israel constituted the "Atchalta d'Geula" (Beginning of the Redemption), though he strongly opposed much of the policies and leadership of the state.

== Published works ==
=== Books ===
- Torah and Reason: Insiders and Outsiders of Torah. Jerusalem: "Hed" Press, 1979.
- Torah and Existence: Insiders and Outsiders of Torah. Jerusalem: A.A.E. Int'l, 1986.
- Torah L'Israel: State Society, Geulat Yisrael. Jerusalem; New York: "Hed" Press, c.1977. Philosophical essays in English and Hebrew.
- Death of Zionism. A.A.E. Int'l, 1993.
- Sefer Agra La-Yesharim. A.A.E. Int'l, 1983. Essays in Halacha.
- Binyan Halakhah. 1942. On Maimonides' Mishneh Torah.
- Agan Ha-Sahar. 1955. On the International Dateline and topics on Kiddush HaChodesh.
- Malbim On The Torah, translated by Tzvi Faier. Hillel Press, 1978. Includes introductory essay by Rabbi Zimmerman.
- He'Aros Chaim - commentary on the sefer Machane Efraim, 1947.
- Torah & Rationalism: Understanding Torah and the Mesorah. Feldheim, 2020.

=== Articles ===
- HaMaor, Vol. 15, No. 10 Elul 5724: באסור ההזרעה המלאכותית
- HaPardes, February 1934: במתנות המזבח
- HaPardes, December 1936: מצוה בגדי כהונה
- HaPardes, December 1936: בענין גר תושב
- HaPardes, April 1937: פסח ומותרו
- HaPardes, October 1937: בענין נעבד בקדשים
- HaPardes, June 1938: ספק טומאה ברשויות
- HaPardes, November 1938: בדין תלוש ולבסוף חבירו
- HaPardes, April 1940: פסח במחשבת חולין
- HaPardes, June 1940: בדין טומאת אוכלים ומשקין
- HaPardes, July 1940: פסח ששחטו לשם חולין
- HaPardes, October 1941: טומאת אוכלין
- HaPardes, August 1947: טומאת דם בקדשים
- HaPardes, November 1948: קדושת בית הכנסת
- Kerem, Vol. 1 No. 4 (September, 1953): קביעת קו התאריך
- Kerem, Vol. 1 No. 4 (September, 1953): תשובות קצרות (Responsa)
- Kerem, August 1958: יסודה של תפילה
- Kerem, Vol. 9 No. 1 (February, 1978): יסודי תורה
- Yeshurun, Vol 5, 1999: ביאור דברי הגר״א בענין שקיעה

Note: A number of articles in HaPardes were later included in the Binyan Halacha.

- Hamaor, 1953: A Responsa: Date Line in Halachah
