= Yeshivas Knesses Beis Yitzchak-Kaminetz =

Yeshivas Knesses Beis Yitzchak
- הישיבה הגדולה כנסת בית יצחק
- Kamyenyets; Second Polish Republic

Information
- Type: Yeshiva
- Religious affiliation: Orthodox Judaism
- Established: 1897
- Closed: 1941
- Enrollment: 350-400 (before World War II)

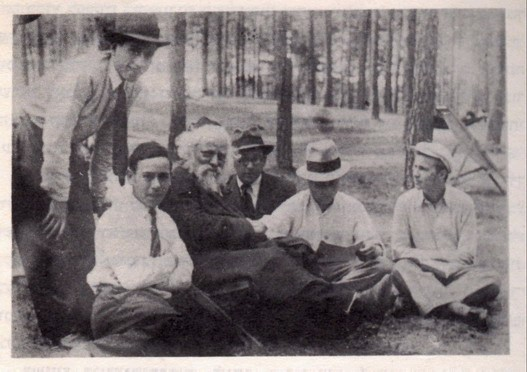
Rabbi Boruch Ber Leibowitz with students

Yeshivas Knesses Beis Yitzchak was an Orthodox Jewish yeshiva, founded in Slabodka on the outskirts of Kaunas, Lithuania (then ruled by the Russian Empire), in 1897. The yeshiva later moved to Kamyenyets, then part of Poland, and currently in Belarus, and is therefore often referred to as the Kaminetz Yeshiva or simply Kaminetz. The yeshiva was famously led by Rabbi Boruch Ber Leibowitz.

== Early years ==
=== Founding ===
Originally, Slabodka boasted the famous Knesses Yisrael yeshiva, founded by Rabbi Nosson Tzvi Finkel in 1882. However, in 1897, controversy broke out in the yeshiva, as many of the students were opposed to the yeshiva strong focus on mussar (Jewish ethics), as opposed to only studying Talmud. The yeshiva therefore split into two, with the one against mussar going under the name Knesses Beis Yitzchok (named for the previous rabbi of Kaunas, Rabbi Yitzchak Elchanan Spektor). The rav of Slabodka, Rabbi Moshe Danishevsky, served as rosh yeshiva. Rabbi Moshe Mordechai Epstein, the rosh yeshiva of Knesses Yisrael, served alongside Rabbi Danishevsky in the town's beis din (Torah court). Despite the friction between the two yeshivos at the time of their division, the cooperation between the two rosh yeshivas thawed the ice. Rabbi Chaim Rabinowitz also served as rosh yeshiva. However, a controversy between pro- and anti-Zionists broke out in the yeshiva, and Rabbi Rabinowitz left the yeshiva. Rabbi Baruch Ber Leibowitz, a student of Rabbi Chaim Soloveitchik and formerly a rosh yeshiva in Halusk, was appointed as rosh yeshiva.

=== Rabbi Baruch Ber Leibowitz ===
Despite the fact that Knesses Beis Yitzchak was not a mussar yeshiva, Rabbi Baruch Ber himself was uncomfortable being labeled as an opponent to mussar. His son-in-law, Rabbi Reuven Grozovsky, who taught in the yeshiva, was a student of the Knesses Yisrael yeshiva in Slabodka, and Rabbi Leibowitz said that only Knesses Yisrael could've produced such a fine personality. Both of his sons-in-law, Rabbi Grozovsky and Rabbi Moshe Bernstein, taught in the yeshiva.

== World War I ==
When World War I broke out in 1914, the yeshiva fled Slabodka for Minsk, and when the war reached there as well, the yeshiva moved further east, settling in Kremenchug in Ukraine, also under Russian Rule, in 1917; Rabbi Leibowitz was with the yeshiva throughout its travels. However, the yeshiva moved again in 1921, this time to Vilna, a bustling city in interwar Poland with a large Jewish population, where they remained for five years. In Vilna, the action of the big city served as a disturbance, and Rabbi Leibowitz moved the yeshiva in 1926 to Kaminetz, a city in the Second Polish Republic.

== Golden Years ==
The yeshiva was welcomed by the Kaminetz Jewish community; the community marched out to greet them, clad in holiday attire, with an orchestra leading the way. Rabbi Leibowitz was seated on a fancy chair, upholstered in velvet, and lifted into the air. The procession then walked with the yeshiva until they reached the yeshiva's new building. A festive meal was then had.

The yeshiva grew exponentially in their new home, with as many as 350-400 students (generally in their late twenties, although a few students were in their thirties), with another 50 in the mechina (a preparatory school for younger students), and seven men in the kollel. Students flocked to the yeshiva from all over the continent, as well as from Palestine and America. The growth of the yeshiva led to a lack of space in their building, and so Mr. Gershon Galin, a Kaminetz native who had emigrated to the United States, took upon himself to erect a new building, and took the first step by purchasing a piece of land and being the first one to donate towards the building fund. In 1932, the building's foundation was laid. On the eighth day Chanukah in 1937, the dedication of the new building was celebrated, in the presence of rabbis from throughout the region.

== World War II ==
=== Exile to Lithuania ===
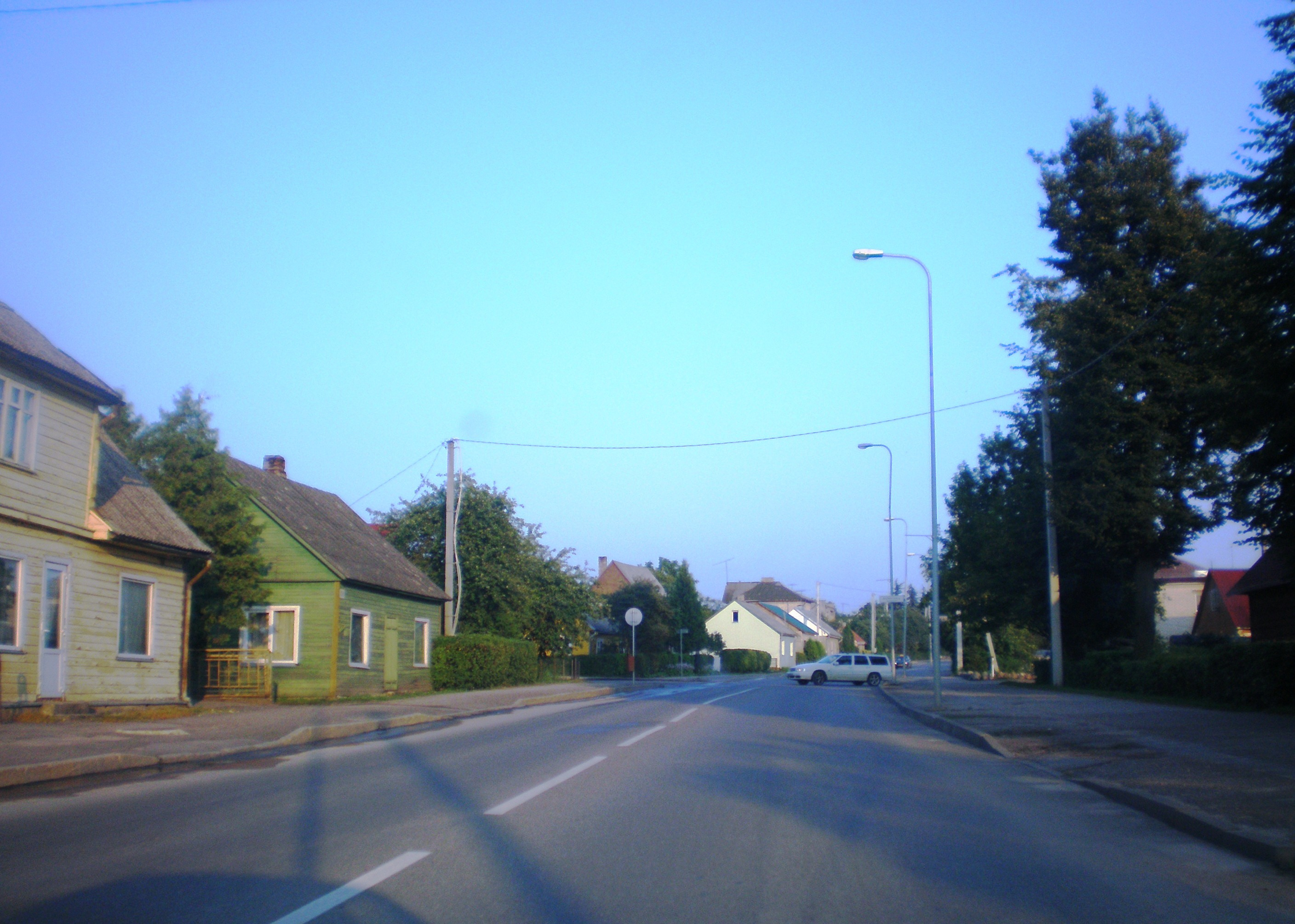
Modern photo of Rasein in Lithuania

In early September 1939, the German Army invaded Kaminetz. They told the local residents that they did not plan to stay for long, as they had signed the Molotov–Ribbentrop Pact, which stated that the Soviet Union would get the eastern half of Poland, and treated them decently. The yeshiva stayed in Kaminetz during the German occupation, and had prayed regularly during the Jewish holiday of Rosh Hashana. The Germans left the city, leaving behind only a small headquarters, at the time that the Russians were supposed to come. However, the Russians didn't come right away, and local gentile anti-Semites took advantage of the anarchy to attack Jews and loot their properties. Ironically, the Jews went to the local Nazi headquarters and requested that their soldiers return to protect them until the Soviets arrived. The Russians arrived on the day before Yom Kippur.

Rabbi Chaim Ozer Grodzensky, the rabbi of Vilna as well as gadol hador (leader of the generation), sent a message to all of the yeshivos under Russian rule that they should escape to Vilna; the Russians had taken the city from Poland and were going to give it back to Lithuania (which it had previously been part of). Therefore, many yeshivos escaped and crowded into Vilna. In the Kaminetz Yeshiva, many of the foreign and Polish students returned home, leaving only half of the yeshiva, approximately 160 students, in the yeshiva, and together they fled to Vilna.

In Vilna, local Jews arranged for the yeshiva to study in the Lokishok Bais Medrash and families offered to take in refugees for lodging The Lithuanian prime minister, who treated the Jews well, decided that having fifteen thousand refugees crowded into the capital city was unsustainable and he therefore ordered the yeshivos to disperse to the nearby towns. The Kaminetz Yeshiva settled in Rasein, where the classes continued as usual. Rabbi Leibowitz died then in 1939.

=== Dispersion ===
Despite their temporary safety, the students understood that they were in the center of a war-zone and tried all they could to leave the country, but all their attempts went in vain. About a year and half later, the Russians reassumed control of Lithuania; when they discovered that the yeshiva students in the countryside were attempting to leave for America, they made plans to send the yeshivos to Siberian labor camps, farther away from the border, as they were worried about anti-communists being so close to the front, lest they join forces with the Nazis and fight against the Soviet Union. Russian soldiers had seized Jewish homes, and the hosts warned the yeshiva students of their plan of relocation. Many went into hiding, while many went along with the plan; the ones who stayed behind in Lithuania ended up getting killed by the Nazis three days later. The students that were deported did not end up going to Siberia, rather to the remote Komi Republic in Russian Asia. They ended up getting split into four groups. The first was dropped off in the village of Zeschart; there were fifteen Kaminetz students in the group. The second group was dropped off in Aykany; (Note: This is likly the village of Aykino, Komi Republic; Russian Wikipedia quotes a resident describing a Soviet work camp in the city. See ru:Айкино (Коми)) the third group, consisting of forty people, in settlement near Syktivkar; and the fourth group was left 150 kilometres from the capital city. Among the fourth group was Rabbi Naftali Leibowitz, the yeshiva's mashgiach.

== Legacy ==
- Yeshiva Toras Emes Kaminetz was founded in Brooklyn as Academy Torath Emeth in 1928. It incorporated in 1934 and later merged with Kamenitzer Yeshiva of Woodridge in the 1950's.
- Yeshivas Kaminetz (Jerusalem), founded 1945 in Israel. Rabbi Moshe Bernstein, son-in-law of Rabbi Boruch Ber Leibowitz and a rebbi (Torah teacher) in the yeshiva in Europe, together with Rabbi Yaakov Moshe Leibowitz, son of Rabbi Baruch Ber, reestablished the yeshiva in Jerusalem in 1945. Notable teachers there were Rabbi Moshe Aharon Stern (he) and Rabbi Chaim Shlomo Leibowitz (he). Rabbi Yitzchok Scheiner was the rosh yeshiva until his death in January, 2021.
