= Avraham Friedman =

American Orthodox rabbi, Talmudic scholar, and rosh yeshiva

Rabbi Avraham Friedman
- Rosh Yeshiva of Beis Medrash LaTorah and Fasman Yeshiva High School
- Began: 2008
- Predecessor: Shlomo Morgenstern
- Studied Under: Ahron Soloveichik, Yaakov Perlow, Chaim Shmuelevitz, Nachum Partzovitz

Avraham Friedman is an Orthodox rabbi and Talmudic scholar in Skokie, Illinois. After twenty five years at the Beis HaMidrash LaTorah yeshiva of the Hebrew Theological College, he became its rosh yeshiva (dean/head of school) in 2008.

Friedman is also an alumnus of the school he heads (Hebrew Theological College - Bais Hamedrash Latorah) where he studied under rabbis Ahron Soloveichik (one of the leading talmudic scholars of his day) and Yaakov Perlow (head of Agudath Israel of America).

Friedman studied in the Mir yeshiva under Chaim Shmuelevitz and Nachum Partzovitz. He was previously a maggid shiur at Yeshivat Kerem B'Yavneh before returning to Hebrew Theological College Beis HaMidrash LaTorah.
