= Yeshivat HaKibbutz HaDati (Ein Tzurim) =

Shiluv yeshiva in Israel

Coordinates: 31.7°N 34.72°E

Yeshivat HaKibbutz HaDati in Ein Tzurim was a Shiluv yeshiva located in the religious kibbutz Ein Tzurim in the southern lowlands of Israel. It closed in 2008.

== History ==
The yeshiva was established in 1975. Initially, it served as a place for Torah study for members and children of the religious kibbutzim, but after a few years, it opened to the general public and also to students from abroad.

The yeshiva was founded by Yedidia Cohen and Shimon Heksher, who also headed it. It migrated between various kibbutzim in the south until the permanent building was established in Kibbutz Ein Tzurim. in 1985. As a Shiluv yeshiva, Rabbi Aharon Shemesh and Rabbi Hanan Porat served on the senior educational team.

After this period, the heads of the yeshiva were Rabbi David Bigman (now the head of the Ma'ale Gilboa religious kibbutz yeshiva) and Rabbi Amit Kula (currently at the "Droma" beit midrash in Ben-Gurion University).

Between the years 2000–2006, Rabbi Yoel Ben Nun served as head of the yeshiva . In 2007, Rabbi Meir Lichtenstein took his place, with Rabbi Aviya HaCohen and Rabbi Yoel Kretzmer-Raziel also leading the yeshiva.

In its final years, the yeshiva suffered from a shortage of students and financial difficulties, leading the secretariat of the religious kibbutz to decide to close it in 2008.

== The nature of study in the yeshiva ==
The yeshiva combined classic yeshiva studies with innovative learning from the world of academic research . It placed great importance on a sincere engagement with the questions posed by the post-modern world, and upheld as an ideal the figure of the modern religious person, who sees themselves, among other things, as part of general society and strives to make an impact both in the world of Torah and in other areas of life.

The yeshiva's general approach somewhat resembled that of Yeshivat Har Etzion, from which several of its faculty members came. However, the yeshiva was more open to academic Talmudic research (such as textual criticism) than Yeshivat Har Etzion.

Politically, the yeshiva was considered moderate, and among the rabbis and students, a variety of opinions coexisted. Among other things, the yeshiva's rabbis signed the petition of the "Yom Pekuda" movement, which called for opposition to any form of political insubordination.

The yeshiva also operated the "Shiluvim Institute," which published religious texts. The most prominent publication was Ish VeIsha (Man and Woman) by Rabbi Elyashiv Knohl, a guide for preparing grooms and brides for marriage, which sold around ten thousand copies. The institute also published a "Pre-Nuptial Agreement" aimed at preventing issues of agunot (women unable to receive a divorce), refusal to grant a get (Jewish divorce), and other related problems.

The yeshiva produced a journal called Mashlav, which alongside articles, sometimes included poetry and short stories written by the yeshiva's faculty and students.

In collaboration with Yeshivat Ma’ale Gilboa, the yeshiva developed in 2001 a combined Selichot liturgy for Ashkenazim and Sephardim. Today, this version is used in several other educational institutions across the country.

== Yeshiva faculty and frequent teachers ==
- Rabbi Avia Hacohen – An expert in teaching Tanakh, he also taught Talmud and Chassidut, with a focus on the thought of Rabbi Zadok HaKohen of Lublin. In 2007, he published a book titled Tefillah LeEl Chai – The Journey of the Soul and the Song of the Spirit in the Book of Psalms.
- Rabbi Elyashiv Knohl – The rabbi of Kfar Etzion and head of the rabbinical ordination program at the yeshiva.
- Yoske Achituv – One of the founders of the yeshiva, he taught Jewish Thought.
- Rabbi Yoel Bin-Nun – Served as the head of the yeshiva and taught Oral Law, Tanakh, and the philosophy of Rabbi Abraham Isaac Kook..
- Rabbi Mayer Lichtenstein – Taught Talmud with in-depth analysis, combining the Brisker method with academic research methodologies. He served as head of the yeshiva after Rabbi Yoel Bin-Nun. He is the son of Rabbi Aharon Lichtenstein and a grandson of Rabbi Joseph B. Soloveitchik.
- Rabbi Rafi Feuerstein – A leader and co-founder of the Tzohar rabbinical organization.
- Rabbi Amit Kula – Rabbi of Kibbutz Alumim
- Rabbi David Bigman – now the head of Yeshivat Ma'ale Gilboa.
- Rabbi Hanan Porat
- R. Mitch Heifetz (head of the overseas program)
- Shimon Heksher
- Rabbi Yedidya Cohen
- Dr. Haggai Misgav
- Rabbi Aharon Shemesh
- Rabbi Chanoch Gamliel
- Rabbi Meir Nehorai
- Prof. Dov Rappel
- Rabbi Mordechai Breuer (guest lecturer)
- Prof. Shalom Rosenberg (guest lecturer)
- Rabbi Shimon Gershon Rosenberg (Rav Shagar) (guest lecturer)

== Notable alumni ==
- Rabbi Binyamin Lau
- Micah Goodman (author of Catch 67)
- Yair Ettinger (author)
- Jacky Levy (journalist and broadcaster)
- Prof. Daniel Rynhold
- Rabbi Aaron Leibowitz
- Elhanan Miller

== The "Shiluv" track ==
The religious kibbutz yeshivot track, known as the Shiluv (Integration) program, is unique in the yeshiva world, combining full three-year military service (in contrast to hesder yeshivot and higher yeshivot, where only partial service is required). This program reflects the view that military service is a necessity, alongside the desire not to separate from the general Israeli population. Therefore, students serve in integrated units with both religious and secular soldiers, rather than in separate divisions.

The Shiluv program combines military service with two years of yeshiva study: one year before service, known as Shiluv Tzair (equivalent to the first-year program in hesder yeshivot), and one year during the service, known as Shiluv Boger (equivalent to the third-year program). After completing their military service, those interested can return to a continuation program at the yeshiva, which includes rabbinical ordination, teacher training at Herzog College in Alon Shvut, and other options.

Additionally, the yeshiva hosted a program for foreign students (Olam program), where some students enlisted in the IDF and made aliyah to Israel.
