= Yeshivat Ma'ale Gilboa =

Coordinates: 32°28′42″N 35°25′06″E

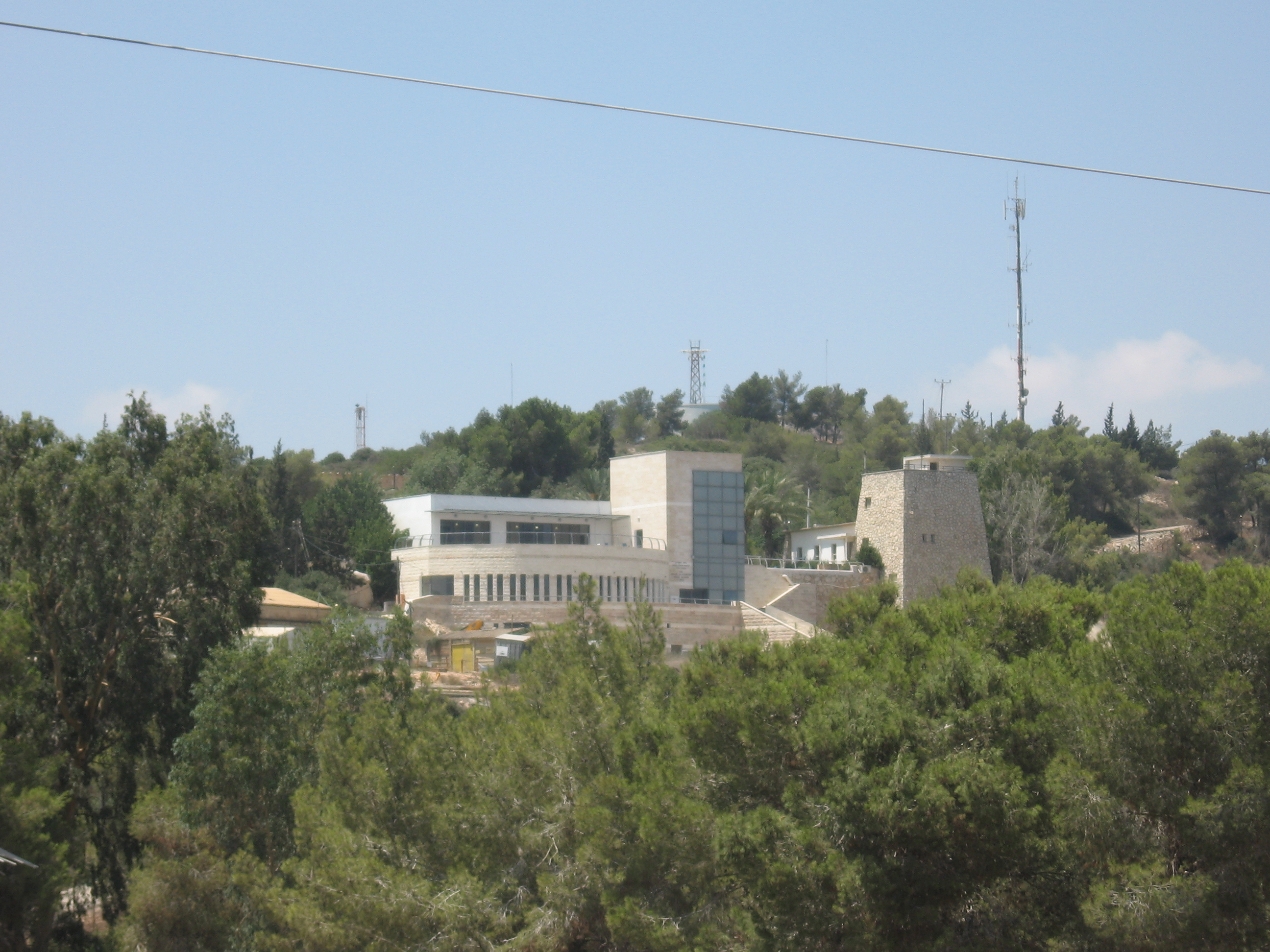
- The Yeshiva's Logo
- Kibbutz Ma'ale Gilboa; Israel

Information
- Type: Post-high-school and Shiluv Yeshiva
- Established: 1993
- Staff: ~15
- Enrollment: ~100 (~15 overseas)
- Affiliation: Modern Orthodox Judaism Dati Tzioni (Religious Zionist)
- Rashei Yeshiva: Rabbi Yehuda Gilad, Rabbi David Bigman and Rabbi Shmuel Reiner
- Website: maalegilboa.org

Yeshivat Ma'ale Gilboa (Hebrew: ישיבת מעלה גלבוע) is a Shiluv Yeshiva located on Kibbutz Ma'ale Gilboa in Israel's Gilboa Mountains. The Shiluv Yeshiva is unique in that it combines two years of Torah study with the full three years of army service. This is in contrast to students from Hesder Yeshivot, which serve in the army for a year and a half and complete three and a half years of Torah study. The Yeshiva emphasizes a commitment to rigorous Torah study, intellectual openness, intellectual disagreement and social consciousness.

== History ==
In 1993, the Kibbutz HaDati (Religious Kibbutz) Movement approached and encouraged Rabbi Shmuel Reiner, then Rabbi of Kibbutz Tirat Zvi, to open a Yeshiva in the north of Israel to complement Kibbutz HaDati's (then) decade old Yeshiva in Ein Tzurim. Rabbi Reiner approached his friend Rabbi Yehuda Gilad, then as now, Rabbi of Kibbutz Lavi, to join him. They jointly began to recruit both students and staff.

Ma'ale Gilboa was chosen to host the Yeshiva due to the natural beauty of surrounding area in addition to strengthening the slowly diminishing kibbutz community.

The Yeshiva opened in 1994, and, in addition to the Rashei Yeshiva, it attracted a staff of educators, including Rabbi Meir Rubinstein and Rabbi David Bigman, who was then Rosh Yeshiva at Ein Zurim and came back to Ma'ale Gilboa to serve as Rosh Yeshiva.

At first, the Yeshiva was hosted in the Kibbutz's Synagogue, but quickly outgrew that. Within several years it moved to its current campus opposite the Kibbutz's old headquarters in the 'Migdal' or 'Tower.' New modern dormitories were built to accommodate the increase in enrollment. Later, the Yeshiva took over the management of the local 'inn' - Margoa BaGilboa.

== Philosophy of the Yeshiva ==
Yeshivat Maale Gilboa is committed to educating a generation of young students who relate to a pluralistic and democratic Israeli society. The Yeshiva's diverse group of educators emphasize a commitment to rigorous Torah study, intellectual openness, and social consciousness. Based on the belief that Talmidei Chachamim have a responsibility to contribute in all branches of society, the teachers at Ma'ale Gilboa have created a broad program that addresses the needs of the contemporary student. As a Shiluv Yeshiva, Ma'ale Gilboa is dedicated to full involvement in modern Israeli life, and therefore obligates its Israeli students to serve a full 3-year tour of military service.

The three main messages of Yeshivat Ma'ale Gilboa are

- Openness to various methods of Torah study including techniques and ideas from the academic world.
- Integration of the analytic and spiritual sides of Judaism and Torah study.
- Sensitivity to the current issues of Am Yisrael and the State of Israel.

As part of its overall philosophy of inclusion and love of man, in 2022 the Yeshiva launched a special program for students with autism.

== Curriculum ==
=== Classes ===
There are multiple classes every day on various topics by a variety of rabbis. Most of the shiurim are in Hebrew. 4-5 shiurim a week are given to the overseas students, usually in English. Classes are offered in Tanakh, philosophy of Halacha, general philosophy, Rambam, Literature, Hassidism, Musar and many other topics. There are over 40 different classes offered throughout the week. Students are encouraged to attend around 6-9 classes per week. These classes are all optional and many second year students opt to learn Talmud with a chevruta instead.

=== Talmud study ===
A major part of the day (and often night) is devoted to the study of Gemara. Gemara instruction endows students with competence in classic yeshiva modes of study and carefully opens doors to new insights provided by complementary academic disciplines in Talmud.

==== Revadim method ====
The Yeshiva has adopted the Revadim method of learning Talmud. The Revadim method sees the Oral Tradition as a living legal system and not only as written text. Therefore, "one should learn the literature of the Oral Tradition in accordance with the dynamic process through which it was formed.". The page of Talmud we study today is composed of various historical Gersaot or manuscripts, which can be broken down into four stages – Mishnah, Tannaitic literature, Amoraic literature and Talmudic literature. Understanding the evolution of these documents and the original intent of their authors leads to a whole new perspective on the study of Talmud.

=== Tanakh study ===
Tanakh is studied in light of the position that: "A passage does not depart from its simple meaning" or the Peshat. Students acquire the skills and ability to study classical commentary and learn to utilize contemporary literary and linguistic methods for deeper insight into Tanakh. Many students follow a Tanakh Yomi or daily Bible class which finishes learning the entire Tanakh in one year. Second-year students are exposed to Biblical Criticism to better prepare them for classes in Biblical Criticism offered in universities.

== Overseas program ==
Yeshivat Ma'ale Gilboa's overseas program is relatively new, yet attracts both post high school and post college students from the United States, England, Australia and more. The Overseas program is fully integrated into the regular Israeli program, other than several English-language classes a week in addition to the Hebrew-language ones. The Overseas students are housed together with Israeli students. The Yeshiva provides certain amenities for the Overseas students, such as laundry service and WiFi, as well as transportation to Jerusalem (two hours south of the Yeshiva). Likewise, the Overseas students are matched with a family living in the Kibbutz, where the students may visit for Shabbat meals and so on. The Yeshiva encourages a broad liberal arts education along with professional education. The overseas students are encouraged to attend universities that have a strong Jewish presence so they will be able to continue learning.

== Campus ==
The Yeshiva is situated on top of Mount Gilboa with views of the Bet She'an Valley, Jordan River Valley, Jezreal valley, the Lower and Upper Galilee, Golan and Mt. Hermon. The campus contains modern dormitories, computer room, classrooms and an auditorium. In addition to a large Hebrew library, the Yeshiva does have over 1000 English books in its growing library. The kibbutz also houses a mini-market, post office and medical clinic.

== Affiliated organizations ==
Yeshivat Ma'ale Gilboa is affiliated with Herzog College, a teacher's college in Gush Etzion. Learning at Ma'ale Gilboa can count toward a teacher's degree. The Yeshiva is also affiliated with Yeshiva University. Study at the Yeshiva for one year counts as 36 credits at YU. The Yeshiva is not affiliated with the Jewish Agency for Israel or the Masa Israel Journey scholarship program, since the Yeshiva does not offer Ulpan courses.
