= Yehuda Gilad (politician) =

Israeli politician

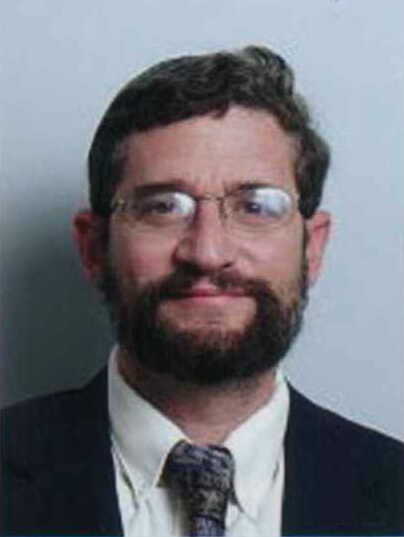
- Gilad in the early 2000s

Faction represented in the Knesset
- 2002–2003: Meimad

Personal details
- Born: 30 August 1955 (age 70) Brazil

Rabbi Yehuda Gilad (Hebrew: יהודה גלעד; born 30 August 1955) is an Israeli former politician who served as a member of the Knesset for Meimad between 2002 and 2003.

== Biography ==
Born in Brazil, Gilad's family emigrated to Israel when he was eight. He was certified as a rabbi and headed a yeshiva. In the early 1990s he worked as an emissary for the Jewish Agency and Bnei Akiva in London, and was a programme director for Gesher, an organisation dedicated to bridging the gap between secular and religious youths.

For the 1999 elections he was placed 33rd on the One Israel list (an alliance of Labor, Meimad and Gesher), but missed out on a seat when the alliance won only 26 seats. In 2002 he became chairman of the Meimad secretariat, and on 5 June 2002, he entered the Knesset as a replacement for Maxim Levy. He lost his seat in the 2003 elections.

He is now a Rosh Yeshivah at Yeshivat Maale Gilboa and the rabbi of kibbutz Lavi. He frequently writes articles on topical issues related to Israel and Judaism.
