= Hlusk =

Hlusk Глуск Hłusk
- Urban-type settlement
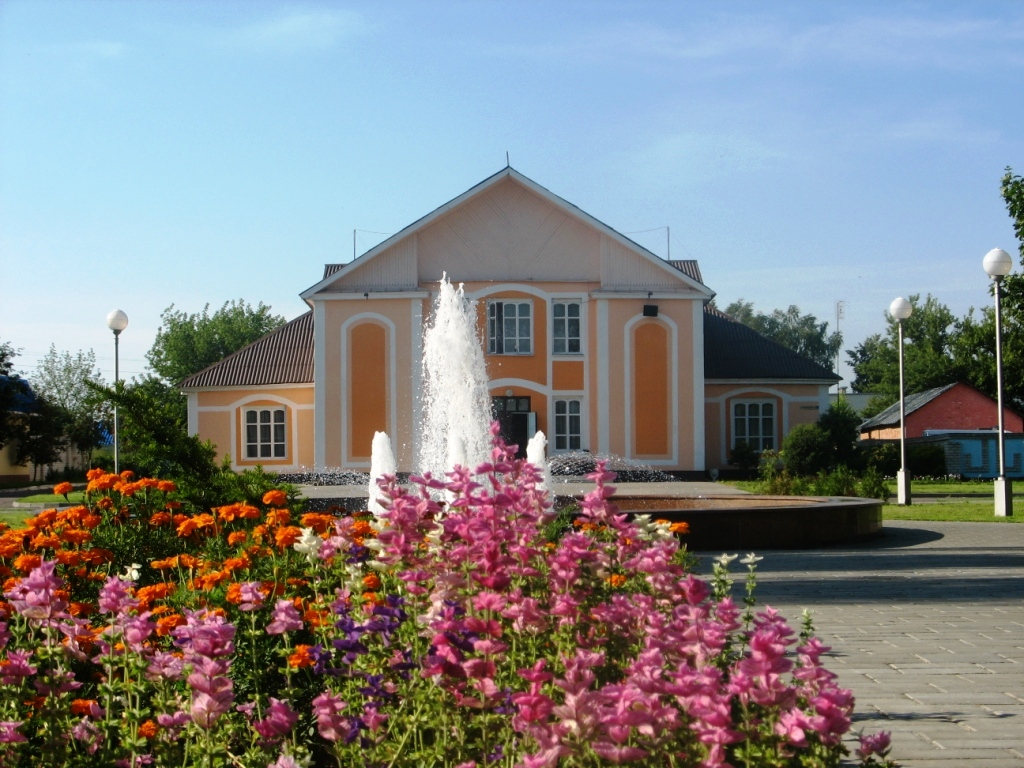

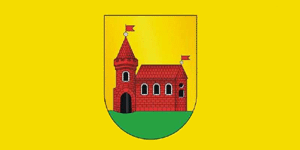
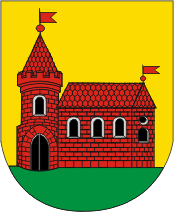
- Flag Coat of arms

- Location within Belarus
- Coordinates: 52°53′22.09″N 28°41′32.03″E
- Country: Belarus
- Region: Mogilev Region
- District: Hlusk District

Population (2024)
  - Total: 6,983
- Time zone: UTC+3 (MSK)
- Postal code: 213879
- Area Code: +375 2230
- License plate: 6
- Website: glusk.mogilev-region.by

Hlusk (Belarusian: Глуск; Russian: Глуск, romanized: Glusk; Polish: Hłusk; Yiddish: האלוסק, romanized: Halusk) is an urban-type settlement in Mogilev Region, Belarus. It serves as the administrative center of Hlusk District, and is home to nearly half of its district's residents. As of 2024, it has a population of 6,983.

== History ==
The earliest written records of Hlusk date back to the 15th century. In March 1655, during the Russo-Polish War, the village was destroyed by the Cossacks, and thus released by the Polish-Lithuanian Commonwealth from paying taxes for the following ten years. There was an active Jewish community there, where Rabbi Avraham Yitzchak Halevi Zimmerman and later Rabbi Baruch Ber Leibowitz served as rabbi (Rabbi Leibowitz later moved to Lithuania). During the Second Partition of Poland, Hlusk became part of the Russian Empire.

=== World War II ===
Hlusk was captured by the Germans in World War II on June 28, 1941, and with such a small population, they didn't put up much of a fight. On December 2, 1941, the Germans massacred much of the Hlusk population, an impact of which the people of the small town still feel today. The Soviet Union finally liberated Hlusk on June 27, 1944.

== Notable people ==
- Boruch Ber Leibowitz (1862–1939), rabbi
- Yanka Bobryk (1905–1942). Belarusian poet. Published since 1924. He published a collection of poems, "Punsovae Ranne." He is also the author of the poem "Galina," about the life of the rural intelligentsia. He also published short stories and essays.
- Vyacheslav Zakharinsky (1950–2016). Belarusian painter. Participated in art exhibitions since 1974. His early works are characterized by lyricism and poetic quality. His works from 1986–1996 are characterized by a complex combination of realistic and formally abstract forms, as well as conceptuality.
- Valery Ivanov (1948–2020). Belarusian composer and teacher. He began his composition career with lyric songs. His most famous works include the cycle of ballad songs, "Budzce abavyazku vernyya" (I Will Always Be True) and songs based on the poems of Belarusian poets. He wrote music for orchestras, theatre, radio and cinema.

== Gallery ==
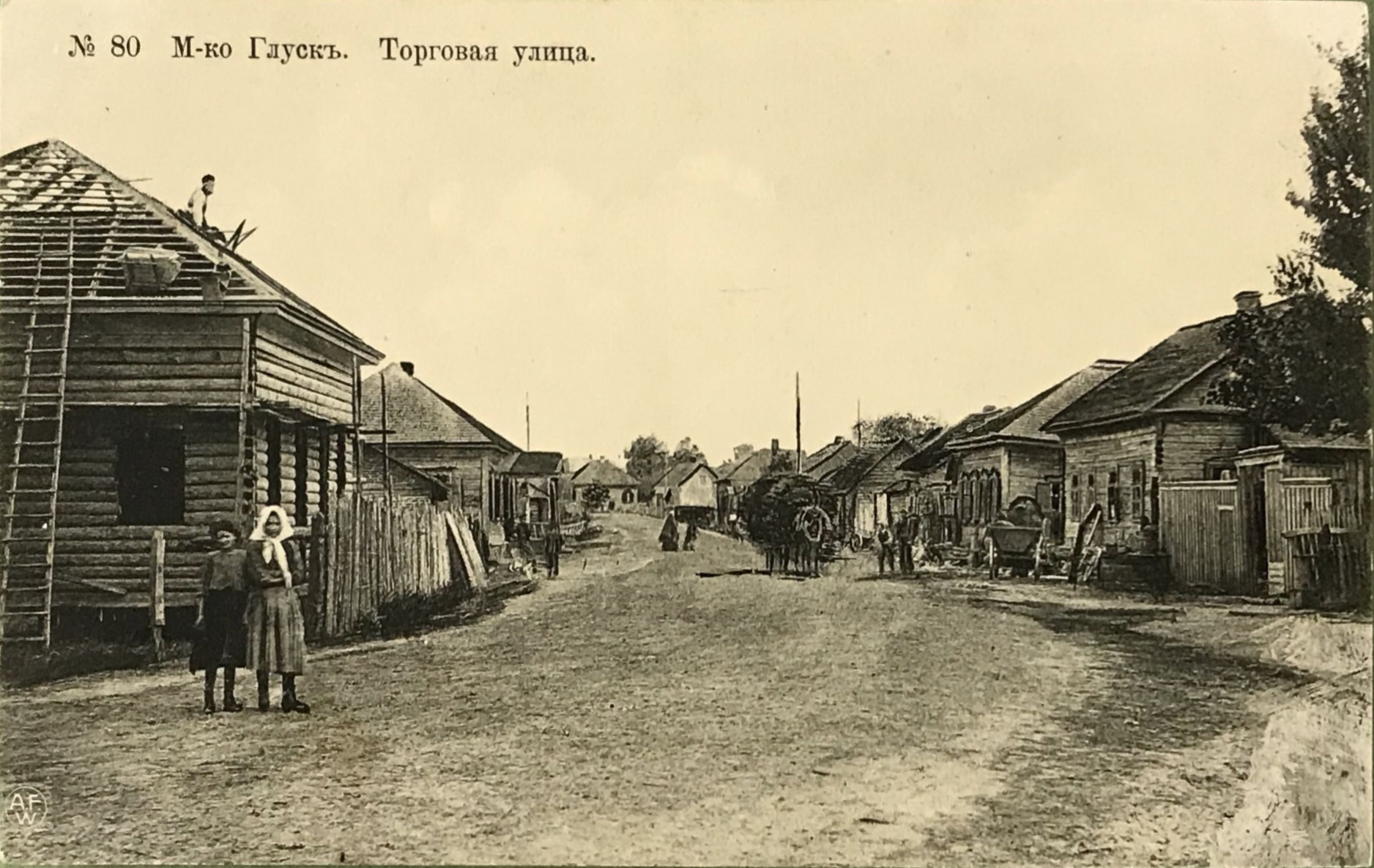
Hlusk, Early 1900s

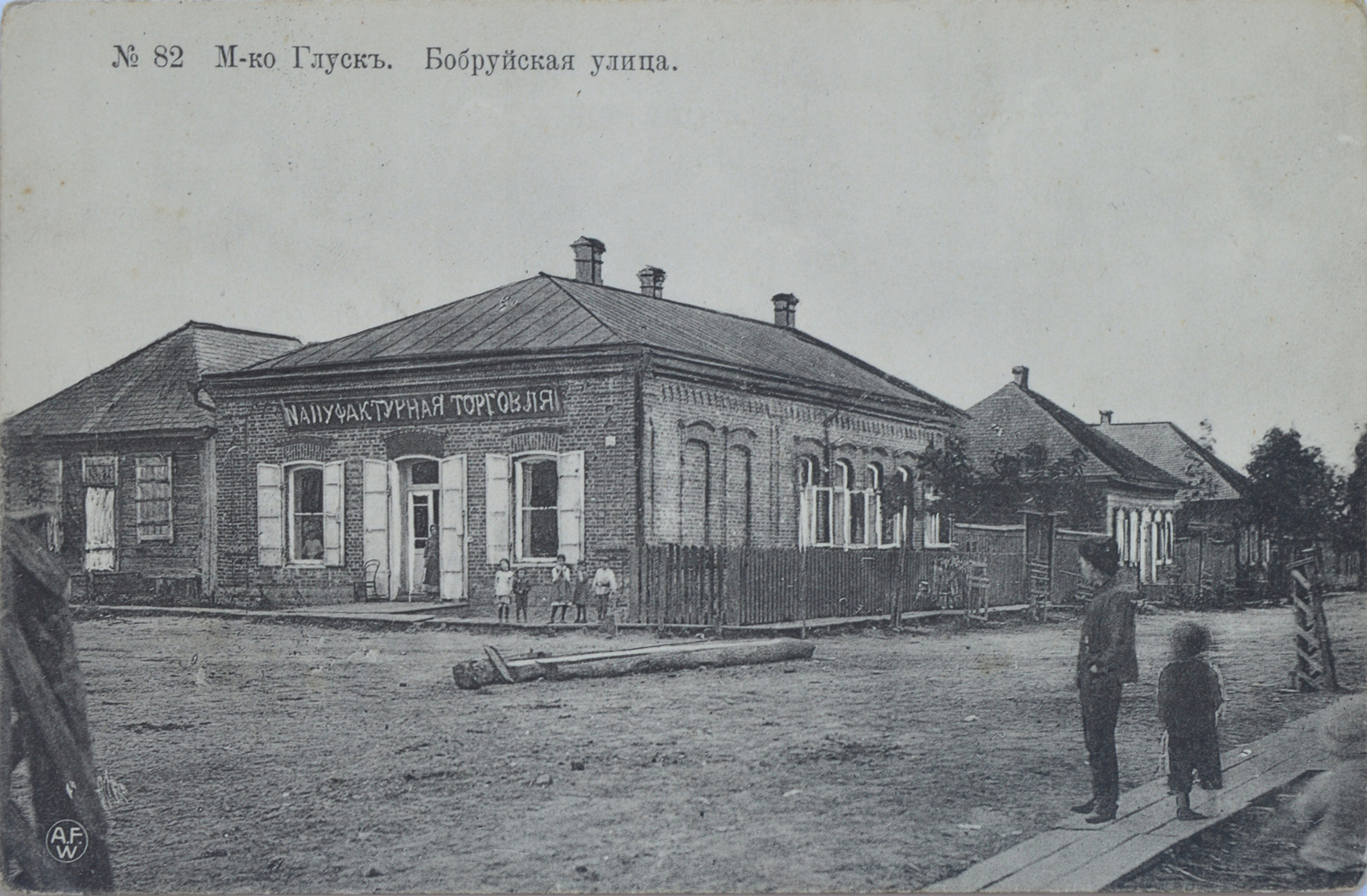
Old photo of Babruysk Street, Hlusk

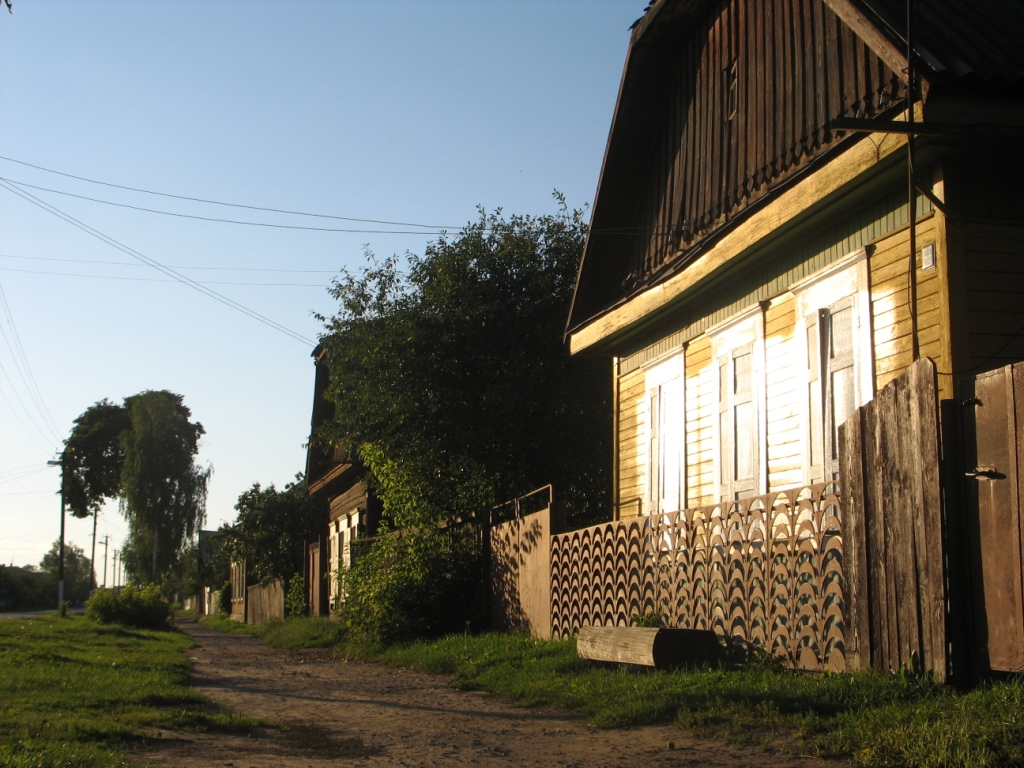
Hlusk street, 2008

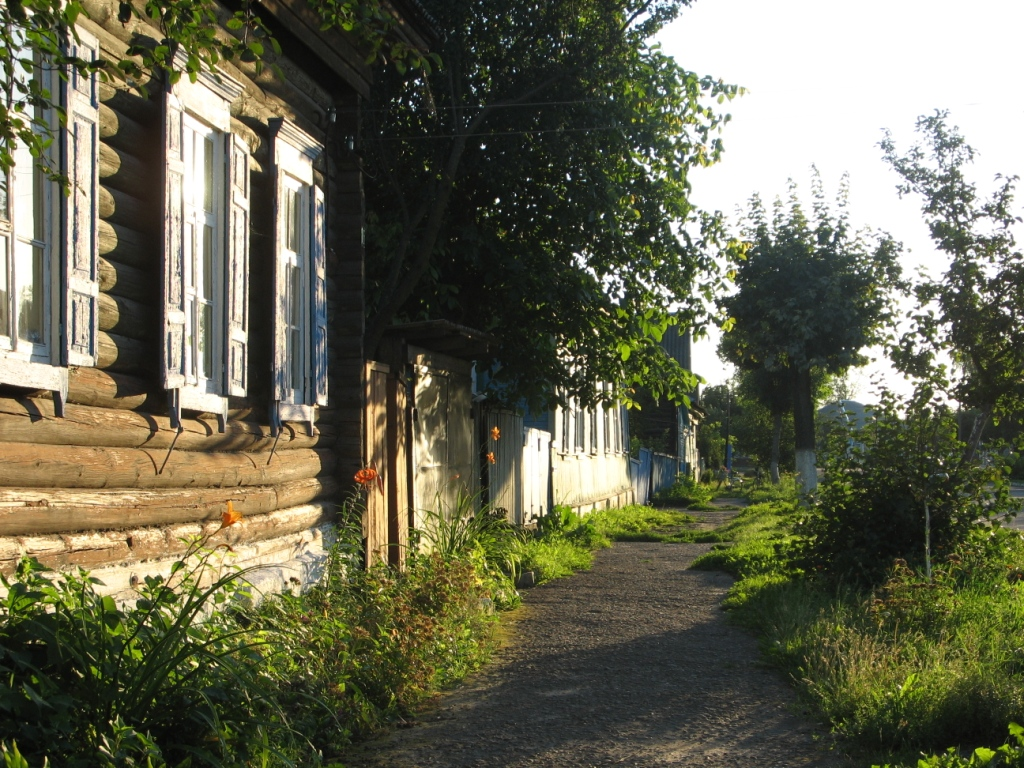
Hlusk street, 2008
