= Kamyenyets =

Town in Brest Region, Belarus

Kamyenyets Каменец Kamenets
- Town
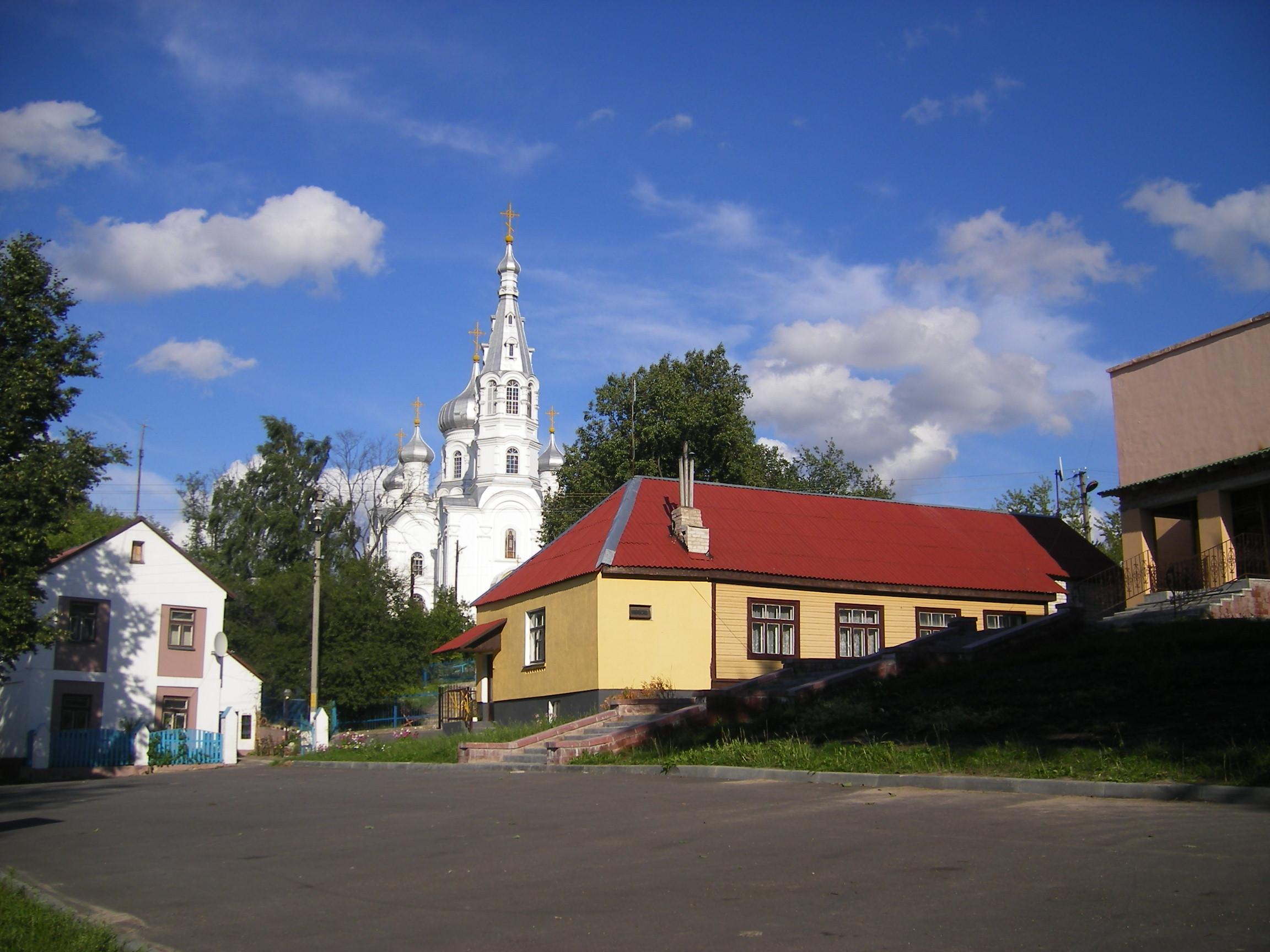

- Coat of arms

- Location in Belarus
- Coordinates: 52°24′N 23°49′E
- Country: Belarus
- Region: Brest Region
- District: Kamyenyets District
- First mentioned: 1276

Population (2026)
  - Total: 8,114
- Time zone: UTC+3 (MSK)
- Postal code: 225050, 225051
- Area code: +375 1631
- License plate: 1

Kamyenyets or Kamenets, (Note: Belarusian: Ка́менец, romanized: Kamieniec, IPA: [ˈkamʲenʲets]; local pronunciation: [ˈkamɪnet͡sʲ], [ˈkamenet͡sʲ]; Russian: Ка́менец; Polish: Kamieniec Litewski; Yiddish: קאַמעניץ־ליטאָווסק, romanized: Kamenits-Litovsk; Lithuanian: Kamianecas; Hebrew: קמניץ דליטא, romanized: Kamenitz D'Lita) also known as Kamyanyets, (Note: Belarusian: Камянец.) is a town in Brest Region, Belarus. It serves as the administrative center of Kamyenyets District. The town is located about 40 kilometres (25 mi) north from Brest. The Lyasnaya River flows by the town. In 2002, its population was approximately 9,000. As of 2026, it has a population of 8,114.

== History ==
Tower and river by Napoleon Orda, 1876

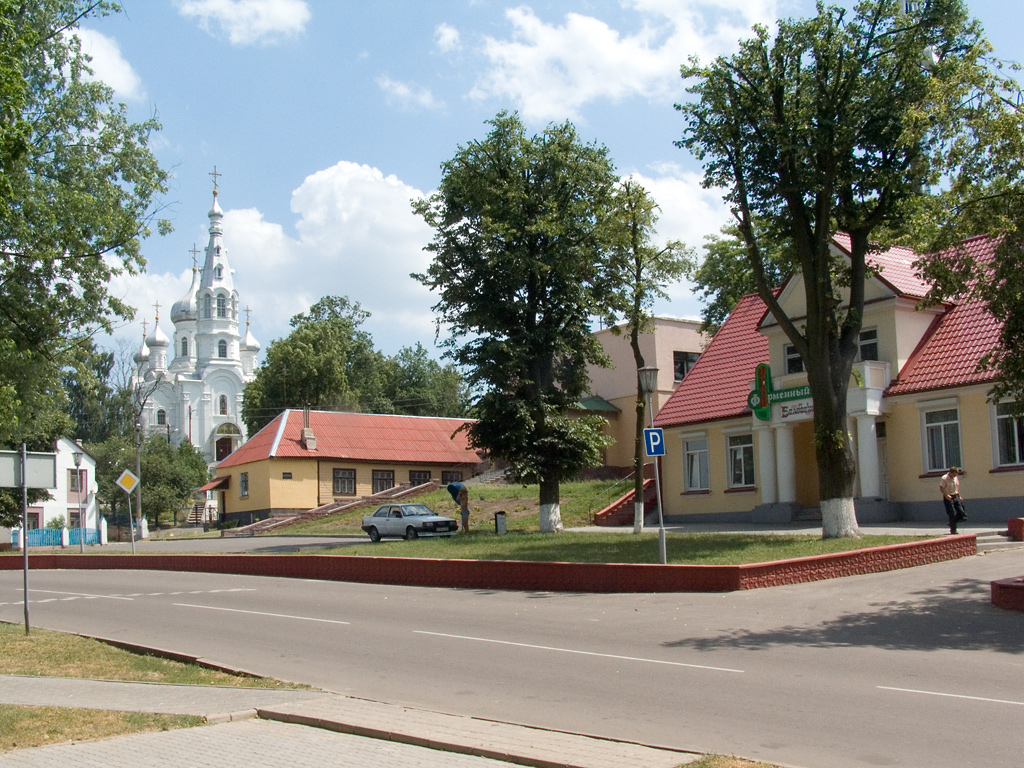
Street View

It was first mentioned in the Galician–Volhynian Chronicle in 1276, when a castle with a keep, the tower of Kamyenyets, was being constructed on this spot, to protect the northern boundary of Volhynia from the raids of invaders. This site on the stony steep bank of the Liasnaja (Lysna or Leśna) River had attracted Oleksa, the prominent builder and architect of Volhynia. He showed the site to Vladimir Vasilkovich, the Prince of Volhynia, who appreciated the place and ordered Oleksa to build a castle with a keep on the spot. Later a town appeared around the fortification. The tower is often called Bielaja Vieža (alternative transliteration: Belaya Vezha), which means White Tower or White Fortress in Belarusian, because after its foundation it was tiled in white. The neighboring primeval forest of Belavezhskaya Pushcha received its name, which also means White Tower, through association with the tower. However, today the color of the castle is brick-red, having weathered through the ages, not white.

The original name of the town comes from the Polish word Kamieniec which means stone fortress in English, as it served as one of the most important fortresses of Polish Kings during the Commonwealth.

In 1366, it was incorporated into the Grand Duchy of Lithuania and in 1376 it was burnt by Teutonic Crusaders but rapidly rebuilt. In 1503, local townsfolk received a limited self-administration right (probably the Magdeburg Rights) that was used by 1795, when it was annexed by Russia. In 1588 and 1659, the town was devastated with plague.

In the 19th century and the first four decades of the 20th century, the local Jewish community was the most active part of the townsfolk. Memories of the town are included in Yechezkel Kotik's memoir, published in English as Journey To a Nineteenth Century Shtetl: The Memoirs of Yekhezkel Kotik. Yeshivas Knesses Beis Yitzchak-Kaminetz was there 1926-1939.

From 1921 to 1939, it was part of the Second Polish Republic. In 1939, it was occupied by Soviet Union and annexed to the Belorussian SSR. From 23 June 1941 to 22 July 1944, Kamyenyets was occupied by Nazi Germany and administered as a part of Bezirk Bialystok. During the Nazi occupation, most local Jews were killed.

After World War II, the town developed as a minor center of the food processing industry (cheese and butter making, baking of bread, etc.).

== Notable residents ==
- Syarhey Kislyak (born 1987), footballer
