= Oleksa =

Oleksa (Ukrainian: Олекса) is a Ukrainian masculine given name, a variant of the Slavic name Alexey, which is derived from the Greek Alexius. Notable individuals with the name include:

== Given name ==
- Oleksa Almaziv (1886–1936), Ukrainian military officer
- Oleksa Bakhmatiuk (1820–1882), Ukrainian tile painter
- Oleksa Dovbush (1700–1745), Ukrainian outlaw
- Oleksa Hirnyk (1912–1978), Ukrainian Soviet dissident
- Oleksa Lozowchuk (born 1976), Canadian composer, music producer and multi-instrumentalist
- Oleksa Nehrebets'kyi (born 1955), Ukrainian television editor
- Oleksa Novakivskyi (1872–1935), Ukrainian painter and art teacher
- Oleksa Shatkivsky (1908–1979), Ukrainian artist
- Oleksa Storozhenko (1806–1874), Ukrainian writer and anthropologist
- Oleksa Volianskyi (1862–1947), Ukrainian priest and ethnographer

== Surname ==
- Michael Oleksa, Russian Orthodox missionary
