= Horvat Sumaqa =

Archaeological site in Israel

- חורבת סומקה (Hebrew) خربة سماقة (Arabic)
- Khirbet Sumaqa, Kharbet Semmakha, Kh. Semmaka
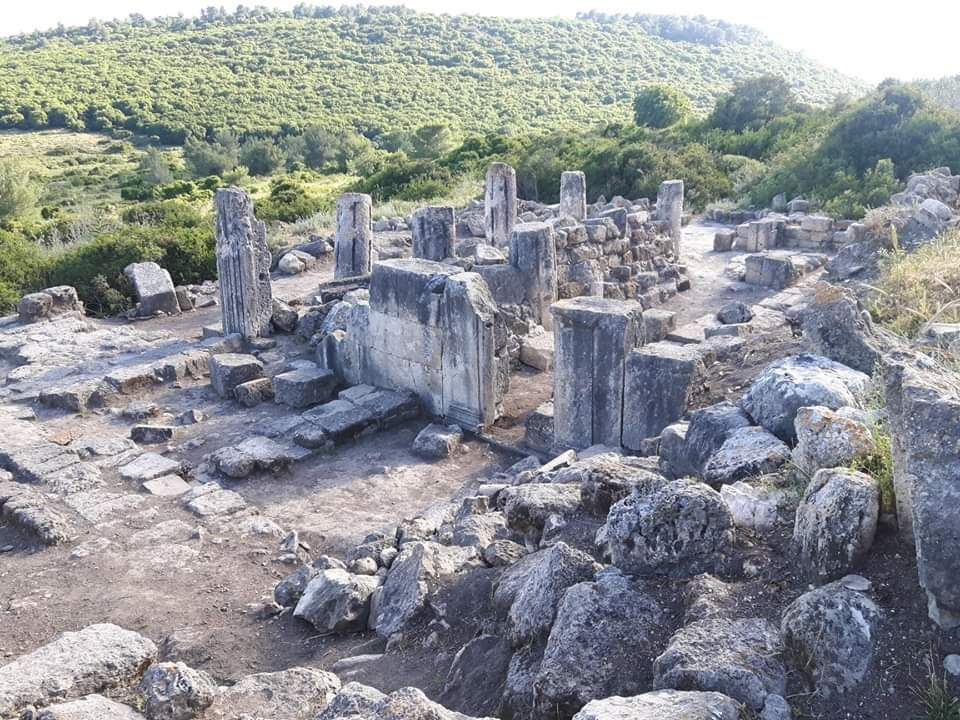
- Remains of the ancient synagogue

- Location within Israel
- 32°40′14″N 35°02′23″E
- Type: settlement, synagogue, workshops, agricultural installations, water system, rock-cut tombs
- Periods: Roman and Byzantine periods (main phases as a Jewish town); Middle Ages (minor occupation, reuse of earlier structures)
- Cultures: Talmudic-era Judaism
- Location: Mount Carmel, Israel
- Palestine grid: 153/230

Site notes
- Height: 350 m (1,150 ft)
- Area: 35 dunams (8.7 acres)
- Excavation dates: 1905, 1983–1993
- Archaeologists: Heinrich Kohl, Carl Watzinger, Shimon Dar, Ariel Siegelmann, Yohanan Mintzker
- Condition: In ruins
- Public access: Limited (only on weekends)

Horvat Sumaqa (alternatively Khirbet Sumaqa or Kh. Semmaka) is an archaeological site located in the Mount Carmel region of northern Israel. It preserves the remains of an ancient Jewish town that flourished during the Roman and Byzantine periods (corresponding to the Rabbinic period in Jewish history). The site includes the remains of a synagogue, domestic buildings, workshops, agricultural installations, an extensive water system, and more than twenty rock-cut tombs, among them tombs decorated with menorah reliefs and carvings of a lion and a bull.

The town, probably founded toward the end of the Early Roman period, reached its peak in the 3rd–4th centuries CE. It relied on highland agriculture and local industry, likely including tanning and other crafts linked to the sumac bush from which its name derives. Archaeology shows that the synagogue went through several phases: an original 3rd-century basilica, a smaller rebuilt phase in the late Byzantine period, and later medieval reuse of the structure for domestic purposes. Industrial and agricultural installations around the site include wine and oil presses, a large water reservoir, and workshops with grooved stone pillars whose function remains uncertain.

Sumaqa seems to have suffered decline and partial abandonment in the 5th century, possibly connected to Byzantine persecution of Jews or the impact of the Samaritan revolts, before being resettled and then abandoned again around the 7th century. The village was resettled again and its workshop sites used into the Crusader and Mamluk periods, and then appears to have been deserted in Ottoman times. The ruins were first described by 19th-century explorers such as Victor Guérin and the PEF Survey of Western Palestine, and were excavated between 1983 and 1993 under the direction of archaeologist Shimon Dar. At present, the site lies within a closed military zone and is accessible to the public on weekends.

== Name ==
Victor Guérin was perhaps the first to transcribe the site's name in writing in 1875 based on what he was told by a local Arab guide, relaying that its ancient name was unknown, unless a clue to it lay in the local name, Kharbet Semmakha. Khirbet means "ruin", while the name Sumaqa or Sumaq and their derivatives refer in both Aramaic and Arabic to the tanner's sumach bush (Rhus coriaria). This bush has been used for centuries for spices, medicine, and tanning. It has been suggested that the site's name is linked to industrial activity that flourished there in antiquity, where workshops may have produced tanning materials from the plant.

Although the settlement itself is not mentioned in ancient textual sources, several rabbinic sages from the 3rd and 4th centuries CE, whose names appear in rabbinic literature and seem to derive from Sumaq, may have originated from this location. These include Ḥilfi ben Samqai, Rabbi Tufa Semuqa, and Rabbi Abba Semuqa.

== Location and geography ==
Horvat Sumaqa is located in the Upper Mount Carmel area of northern Israel inside a closed military zone. It lies about 2.5 kilometers south of Daliyat al-Karmel and roughly 5 kilometers west of the summit of Mount Carmel. The settlement was built on a low rocky hill, about 350 m above sea level. To the north, the hills rise to around 450 m, while to the south and west the terrain drops to 200–300 m. The hill is composed of hard chalk, with the surrounding slopes formed of softer chalk. The hard chalk was used by the ancient town's inhabitants for constructing their homes. Immediately northwest of the site runs the deep, rugged riverbed of Nahal Haruvim, which served as a natural boundary for the settlement. To the south lies a fertile valley.

The village had no perennial water source. Instead, its inhabitants relied on rainwater collected in rock-hewn underground cisterns. An old cistern west of the site is still functioning today.

== History ==
Sumaqa contains the remains of a Jewish town from the Roman and Byzantine periods, corresponding to the Rabbinic period in Jewish history. The settlement appears to have been founded toward the end of the Early Roman period, as suggested by remains beneath the synagogue that predate its construction, including fragments of a Herodian lamp and terra sigillata. It reached its main phase of growth and prosperity in the 3rd–4th centuries CE. The ruins extend over roughly 35 dunams (about 8.7 acres), suggesting that Sumaqa was a town of medium size.

In the 5th century the settlement declined sharply and appears to have been briefly abandoned, possibly in connection with Byzantine persecution of Jews, or with the Byzantine suppression of the Samaritan revolts, during which imperial reprisals also destroyed Jewish communities, including the nearby Jewish settlement of Husifah (modern Isfiya). Repairs and multiple building phases in the synagogue and houses point to a later phase of renewal, but coin finds indicate a break in occupation from the early 5th to the mid-6th century.

The site was resettled, then abandoned again around the mid-7th century, with some evidence that a small Christian population may have lived there at one stage. There are traces of seasonal or temporary habitation during the period of Crusader rule, with the site perhaps used as a hunting encampment, as evidenced in the bone artifacts unearthed belonging to wild boars. During the Mamluk period, buildings including the once synagogue were restructured, serving as a residence, with other structures reused or built over. Medieval sources describe the Carmel area as passing from Crusader to Mamluk control, while in the Ottoman period the site appears to have stood empty.

== Research history ==
Scientific research on Horvat Sumaqa began in the 19th century, with visits by explorers such as Victor Guérin (1875) and the team of the PEF Survey of Western Palestine led by C. R. Conder and H. H. Kitchener (1881). Conder and Kitchener described the site as "a place of importance on a flat hill-top on Carmel, with a deep valley behind," adding that "there seems good reason to suppose that a synagogue stood here." In documenting the architectural fragments around the building, they noted similarities to the synagogues at Bar'am and Meiron. Other early visitors who left descriptions of the site include Lawrence Oliphant (1887) and Graf von Mülinen (1908). In 1905, Heinrich Kohl and Carl Watzinger carried out excavations in the synagogue, published in 1916. Over the following years, villagers from the nearby Umm az-Zinat took stones from the site, leading to the loss of many of its original structures. The area was later surveyed by the northern team of the Archaeological Survey of Israel, headed by Ya'aqov Olami.

The site has suffered damage in the 20th century. Targets were placed on the ancient synagogue for target practice by the Israel Defense Forces during training sessions, which resulted in damage to parts of the structure; several nearby burial chambers were also damaged. Archaeological work began in earnest in 1983, in response to calls from Hava Lahav of the field school of the Society for the Protection of Nature in Israel to the archaeology department of Bar-Ilan University to help protect the remains of the ancient synagogue.

Eleven seasons of large-scale excavations were conducted at Horvat Sumaqa between 1983 and 1995, sponsored by the Department of Land of Israel Studies at Bar-Ilan University and the Carmel Field School. The excavations were directed by Shimon Dar, together with Ariel Siegelmann and Yohanan Mintzker, and focused mainly on the synagogue, while also uncovering domestic buildings, workshops, and the central reservoir. Excavation work was often temporarily suspended often due to evacuation orders from the Israeli army to facilitate their trainings in the firing range, during which time the team would conduct surveys of other nearby already excavated archaeological sites with the permission of the Israeli Antiquities Authority.

== Synagogue ==
The synagogue was built on the southern slope of the hill, on a terrace cut into the slope, with the façade facing east.

=== Phase I (Large synagogue, 3rd century CE) ===
The synagogue's first phase is dated to the 3rd century CE in the Late Roman period, based on coinage, pottery, and its characteristic architectural style. It remained in use until it was apparently destroyed deliberately in the 4th or early 5th century CE, possibly in the context of Byzantine persecution of Jews or as a result of the wider impact of the Samaritan revolts reaching the Carmel region.

The building likely had the plan of a basilica, estimated to measure 14.80 x 23.80 m including the narthex. The excavators, Dar and Mintzker, write that "the walls were constructed of large ashlar stones, shaped by combed-chisel dressing and assembled with fine joints without mortar." To achieve a level floor, builders "cut into the bedrock on the building's northern side and built the up foundations on the southern side."

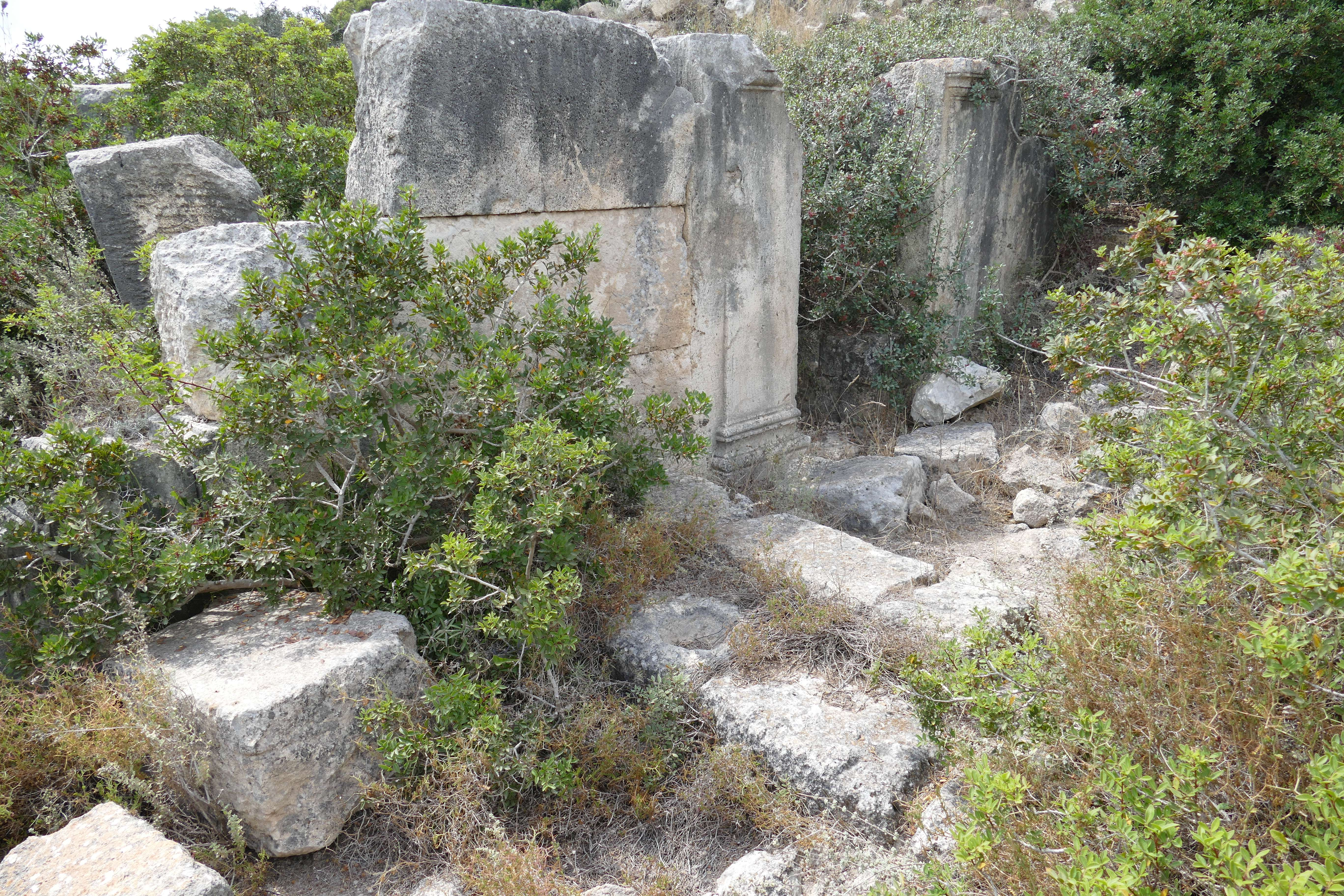
Remains of the northern doorway in the synagogue's façade

The eastern façade show evidence of three doors. Fragments, including a frieze suggesting the angle of the gable, several cornices, and a conch decoration for a window lintel, help reconstruct the façade's original look. Fragments of a three-dimensional eagle statue were found and may have belonged to an art piece that once stood above the main doorway. A massive lintel fragment decorated with a lion and a goblet was also uncovered outside the façade. In the 19th century this lintel was still complete, showing two lions facing a goblet between them, with a small cup above one of the lions, as recorded by the PEF survey team.

A stone fragment bearing part of a recessed frame and the Hebrew letter mem or lamed was also discovered, reused in a step dating to the medieval period. Two sets of stylistically identical Ionic columns were present: larger ones were seemingly used for the main room and smaller ones for the narthex. A hard lime plastered floor was found, constructed in three layers: stone soling, rammed lime with crushed stones, and a hard lime plaster finish.

=== Phase II (Smaller rebuilt synagogue, 5th–7th centuries CE) ===
The structure underwent major changes in the late Byzantine period. Internal walls narrowed the original hall to approximately 10 x 15 m. Benches were added along the plastered walls. Five grooved pillars were found upright within the synagogue; they had different diameters and heights and were likely brought from the nearby industrial workshops to repair the building, as they were not part of the original construction.

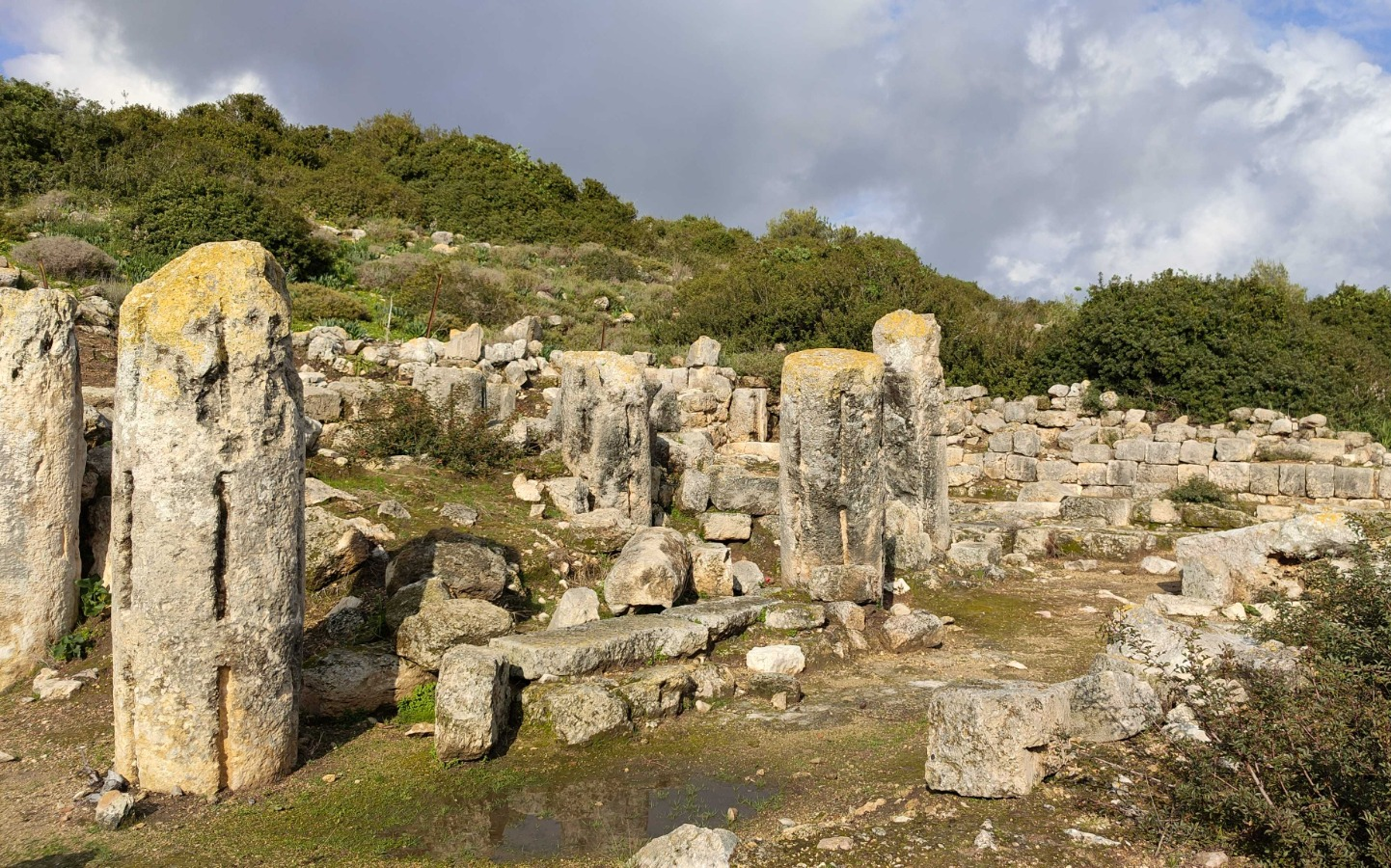
Reused grooved pillars in the rebuilt phase II of the synagogue

A small menorah scratched on the façade wall suggests the building may have continued to function as a Jewish place of worship during this phase. A small hoard of six Byzantine coins was discovered, the latest dating to 618/619 CE, during the reign of Heraclius, the last Byzantine emperor to rule the Levant before the Muslim conquest.

=== Phase III (Domestic use, 11th–15th centuries CE) ===
After abandonment, likely in the early Islamic period, the synagogue was reused in the Middle Ages, but not as a synagogue: instead, the remains of kitchenware, animal bones and ovens, found in the eastern wall, points to domestic use.

=== Assessment and identification ===
The interpretation of the structure has been questioned by some scholars. Adam L. Porter, a scholar of religion, noted that the building exhibits several architectural features atypical of ancient synagogues, including an east–west orientation rather than facing Jerusalem and the absence of elements commonly associated with synagogues, such as a bema, Torah niche, or fixed benches along the walls. Yehudit Turnheim, a scholar of ancient art, similarly argued that these features complicate the identification of the building as a synagogue. At the same time, Turnheim cautions that ancient synagogues exhibit significant regional variation and concludes that each structure must be evaluated on its own merits.

== Structures and installations ==
On the southwestern side of the site, excavations uncovered a residential insula measuring about 25 × 35 m (roughly 800 m²), built with well-cut stone blocks. Two main construction phases were identified, with most finds dating from the 3rd to 5th centuries CE. In the later phase, pig bones were found, which may indicate a change in the population during the Byzantine period. A terracotta lamp decorated with a seven-branched menorah was found, as well as the base of a Byzantine-period bowl bearing a human figure, possibly a saint or an emperor. Beside one of the rooms, a rock-cut cellar was discovered that may have served as a mikveh (Jewish ritual bath). Next to this domestic quarter stands an underground water reservoir with a capacity of around 100 cubic meters of collected rainwater.

=== Workshops ===
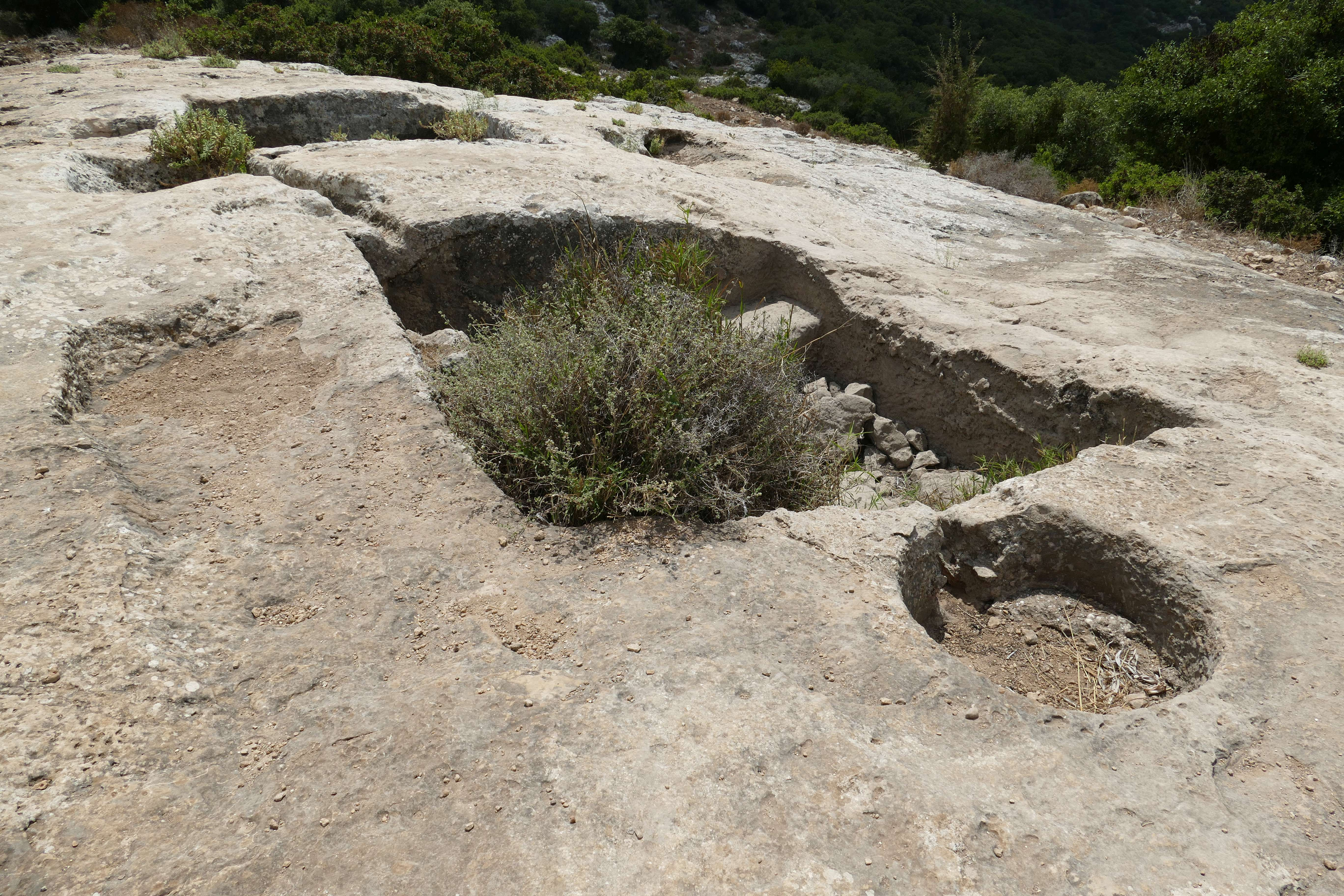
Wine press

Around the site, about six agricultural installations were recorded, including rock-cut oil and wine presses. Four wine presses are known. One large installation, about 10 × 15 m in size, has a central collecting vat with an estimated capacity of up to 10,000 liters. A nearby rock-cut, pear-shaped cave may have been used for storing or fermenting wine. The oil press consists of a production area and a collecting pit that could hold up to 600 liters of liquid; its fill produced 24 coins from the 4th century CE.

In addition, roughly a dozen workshops were identified. These include plastered work surfaces, large collecting pits (holding up to 8,000–9,000 liters), and grooved pillars, which were in use up to modern times (presumably during the village's resettlement in the Mamluk era). Around thirty such pillars were found across the site. Their precise function is uncertain, but they may have been connected to processing products from the tanner's sumac bush, dyeing materials, or stretching skins in the tanning process.

== Animal remains ==
Animal bones recovered at the site indicate a herd-based agricultural economy. As in other sites in the Carmel region, sheep and goat bones were by far the most dominant throughout all phases of occupation, compared with the lower proportion of cattle, which likely served primarily for labor and dairy rather than for meat. Additional domestic species recovered at the site, though in smaller quantities, include chickens, ducks, donkeys, and camels. These remains, and particularly limb bone displaying butchering marks, indicate that the finds largely represent butchery offal from animals used for local consumption.

While in the Roman and Byzantine periods pig remains were negligible, less than 1%, their proportion rose to over 4% in the Middle Ages. The presence of these, also found in the upper construction phase of the residential complex, may hint at a change in the population composition during the late Byzantine period, perhaps connected to the settlement of a Christian population in the Carmel region. In addition to domestic animals, the site yielded remains of wild fauna, originating either from the natural environment or from limited hunting. These include gazelle, roe deer, wild boar, red fox, and the Greek tortoise, as well as cave-dwelling species such as the striped hyena. Hyena remains were found in the burial cave complex, suggesting that the caves were used as shelter by predators.

Archaeological examinations conducted on remains from the rock-cut pool identified as a mikveh, which served as a dump pit after falling out of use, revealed fish finds; the species identified included marine or brackish water fish such as mullets, gilt-head breams and redbelly tilapia. This suggests trade links with fisherman along the Mediterranean coast.

== Rock-cut tombs ==
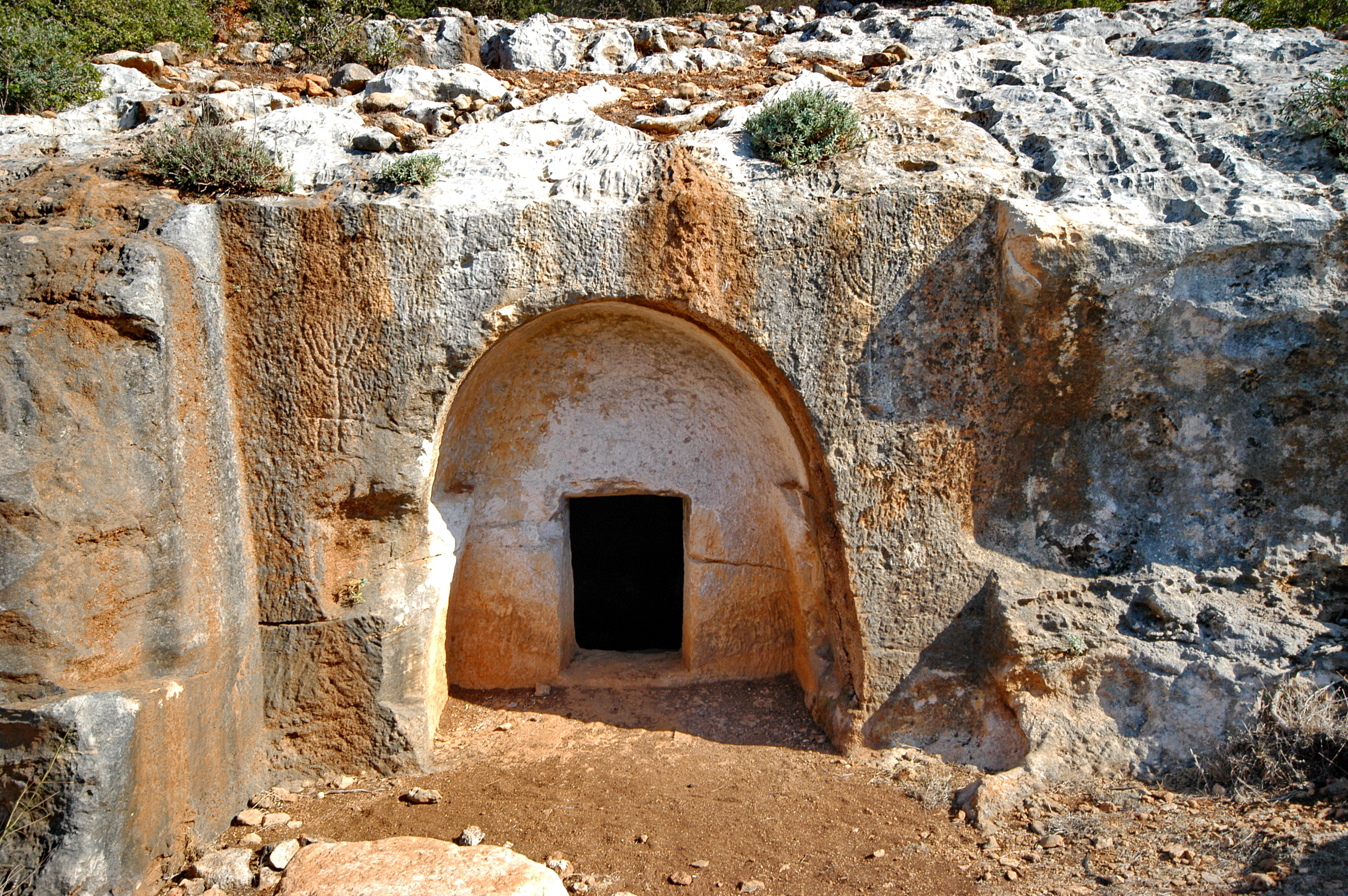
Rock-cut tomb with two carved menorahs on its façade

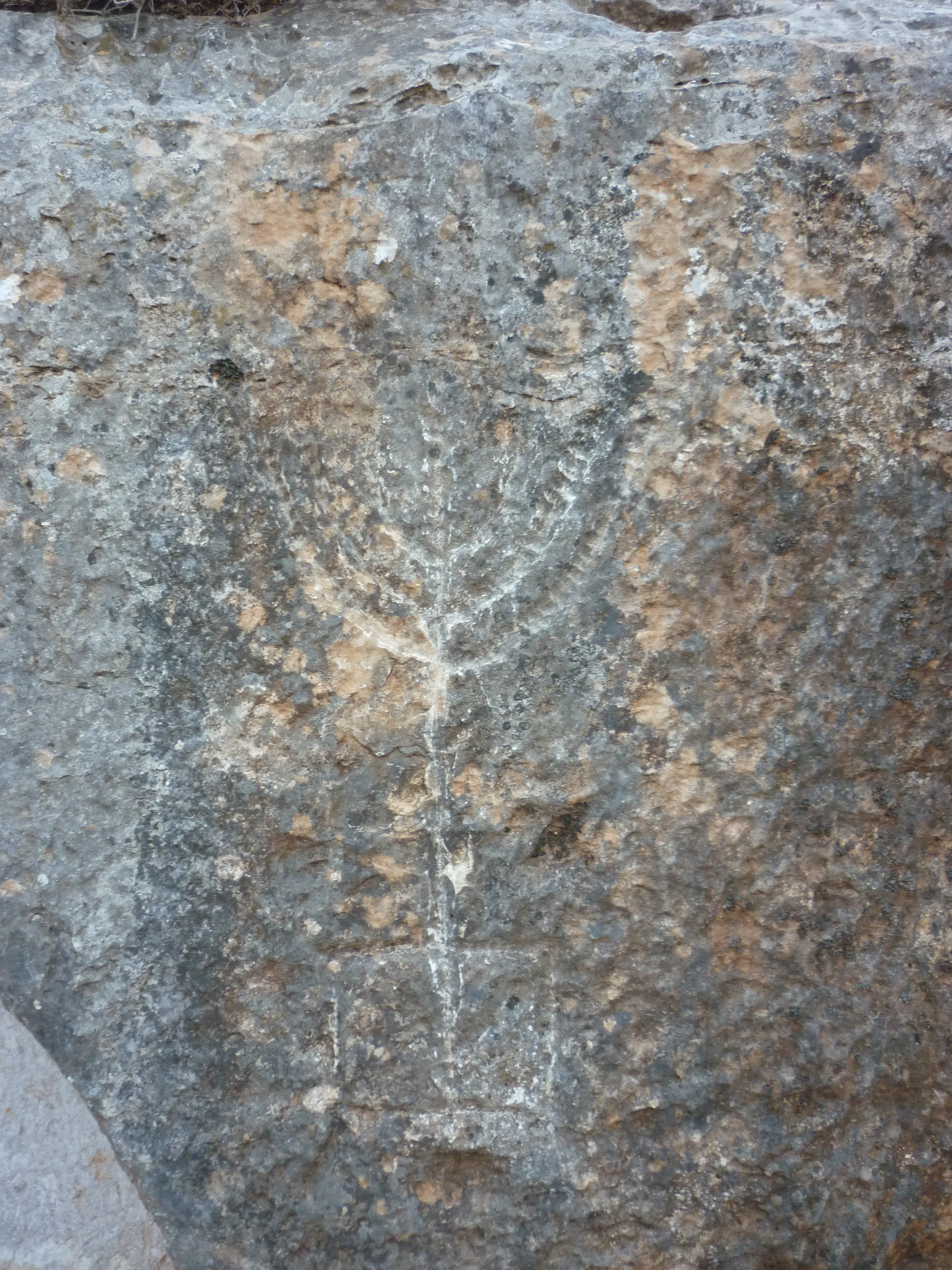
Close-up of one of the menorahs

Over 20 rock-cut tombs were discovered around the archaeological site. According to archaeologist Amos Kloner, they are dated to the end of the 2nd or beginning of the 3rd century. Some of the tombs are located in the upper reaches of Nahal Haruvim, northwest of the site. One of these has two seven-branched menorahs carved on its façade and contains two burial chambers with six arched loculi. Additional tombs lie to the south of the site, in what was once an ancient quarry. One of these is decorated with a floral motif and a damaged carving of two animals, probably a bull and a lion. No inscriptions were found inside the tombs and the interiors were badly damaged and looted.

== See also ==
- Bar'am National Park
- Chorazin
- Gush Halav
- Huqoq
- Khirbet Shema
- Meiron
- Qision

== Bibliography ==
- Conder, C. R.; Kitchener, H. H. (1881). The Survey of Western Palestine: Memoirs of the Topography, Orography, Hydrography, and Archaeology. Vol. 1. London: Committee of the Palestine Exploration Fund. pp. 318–319.
- Dar, Shimon (1988). "Horvat Sumaqa - Settlement from the Roman and Byzantine Periods in the Carmel". Bulletin of the Anglo-Israel Archaeological Society. 8: 34–48.
- Dar, Shimon; Ben Ephraim, Y.; Chaim, S.; Drory, J.; Henig, M.; Horwitz, L.K.; Jacobson, G.L.; Kindler, A.; Kingsley, S.A.; Lemau, O.; Liphschitz, N.; Tsatskin, A.; Tumheim, Y.; Weinstein-Evron, M. (1999). Sumaqa: A Roman and Byzantine Jewish village on Mount Carmel, Israel (BAR International Series 815 ed.). Archaeopress Publishing.
- Dar, Shimon (2014). Rural Settlements on Mount Carmel in Antiquity (PDF). Archaeopress Archaeology. p. 10, 12-13.
- Dar, Shimon; Mintzker, Yohanan (1994). "Synagogue of Ḥorvat Sumaqa, 1983-1993". Ancient Synagogues. Vol. 1. Brill. pp. 157–165. doi:10.1163/9789004532359_014. ISBN 978-90-04-53235-9.
- Guérin, V. (1875). Description Géographique Historique et Archéologique de la Palestine (in French). Vol. 2: Samarie, pt. 2. Paris: L'Imprimerie Nationale.
- Hirschfeld, Y. (1997). "Farms and Villages in Byzantine Palestine". Dumbarton Oaks Papers. 51: 33–71. doi:10.2307/1291761. ISSN 0070-7546. JSTOR 1291761.
- Lernau, Omri (1999). "Fish Remains from Horvat Sumaqa". In Dar, Shimon (ed.). Sumaqa: A Roman and Byzantine Jewish village on Mount Carmel, Israel. BAR International Series. pp. 379–380.
- Kolska Horwitz, Liora; Tchernov, Eitan; Dar, Shimon (1990). "Subsistence and environment on Mount Carmel in the Roman Byzantine and Medieval periods". Israel Exploration Journal. 40 (4): 287–304.
- Porter, Adam L. (November 2001). "Reviewed Work(s): Sumaqa: A Roman and Byzantine Jewish Village on Mount Carmel, Israel by Shimon Dar". Bulletin of the American Schools of Oriental Research (324). The University of Chicago Press on behalf of The American Schools of Oriental Research: 117–118. doi:10.2307/1357637. JSTOR 1357637.
