= Ancient synagogues in Israel =

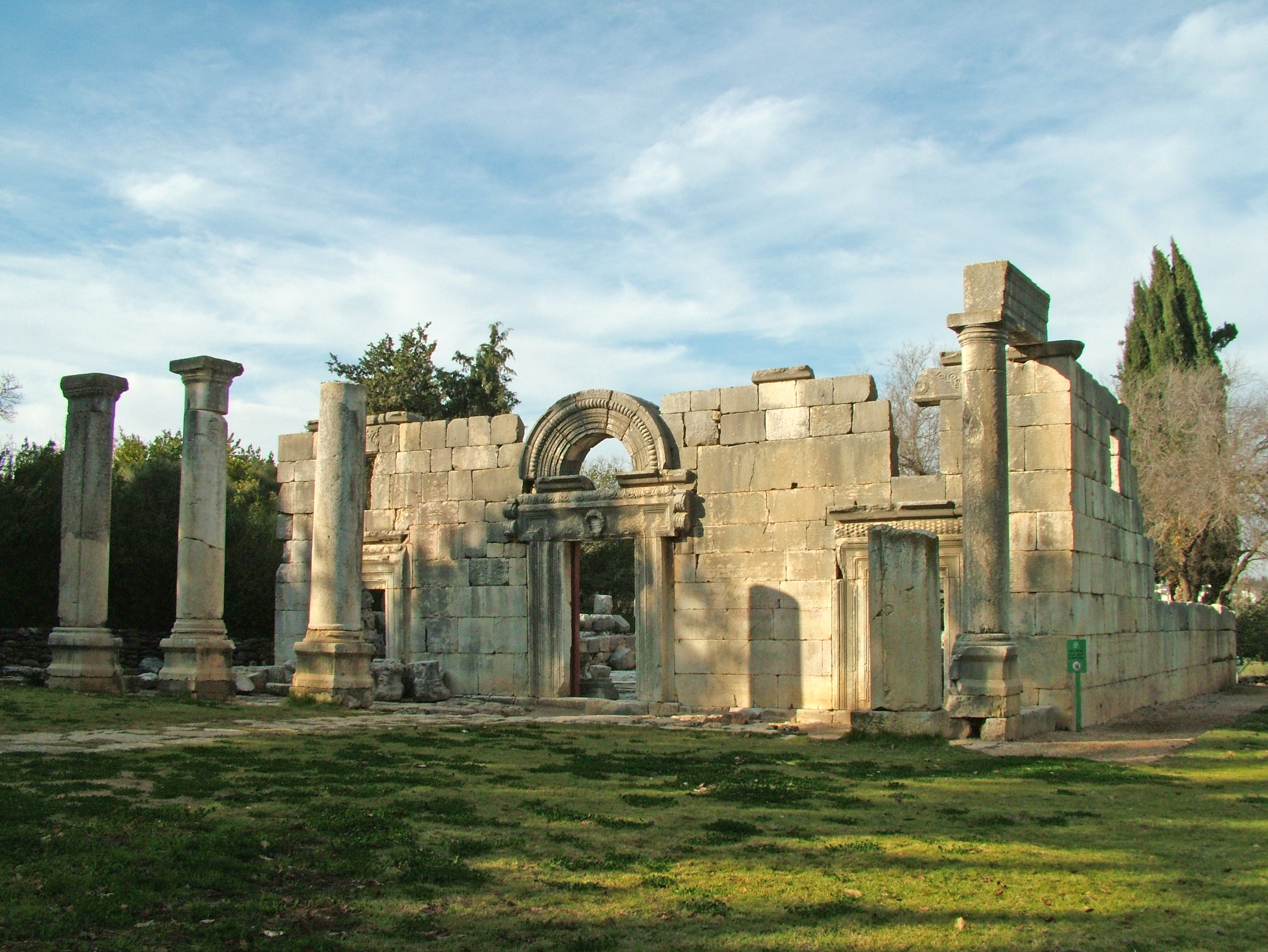
Ruins of the ancient synagogue in Kafr Bir'im in the Galilee.

Ancient synagogues in Israel are synagogues built within the territory of present-day Israel by Jewish and Samaritan communities from the Hasmonean and Herodian periods (during the Second Temple period) to the Early Islamic period.

Remains of many synagogues more than two thousand years old have been uncovered, including several that were in use before the destruction of the Second Temple in 70 CE. Synagogues securely dated to that period include the two synagogues from Migdal, the White Synagogue at Capernaum, the synagogue at Khirbet Umm el-Umdan, and the small synagogue at the top of Masada. The Theodotos inscription from Jerusalem is generally considered to originate from a Second Temple period synagogue, although the building itself has not been found.

Identifying an ancient synagogue requires care. Many have been discovered through archaeological excavation, but others were destroyed and rebuilt several times on the same site, so a site or congregation may be ancient while the standing building is modern.

Numerous inscriptions have been found in the ancient synagogues in Israel. The vast majority, c.140, of these are in Aramaic, with another c.50 in Greek and only a few in Hebrew.

== Modi'in synagogue (2nd century BCE) ==
Discovered at Umm el-Umdan, a site between Modi'in and Latrun, is the oldest synagogue within modern Israel that has been found to date, which existed between the end of the 2nd and the late 1st century BCE, during the Hasmonean period. It was rebuilt in the late 1st century BCE during the Herodian period. This second phase includes a nearby mikve, additional to the preserved sitting bath in the courtyard, which existed already during the first phase.

Another synagogue in the area is the Khirbet Badd 'Isa synagogue (1st century BCE), in modern Qiryat Sefer/Modi'in Illit, near the ancient ascent of Bethoron.

== Nabratein/Naburiya synagogue ==
Naburiya was a Jewish village in the Galilee during the First and Second Temple periods. Neburaya is believed to be identical with Nabratein, a location north of Safed where Eleazar of Modi'im and Jacob of Kfar Neburaya, a compiler of the Haggadah, are buried.

The remains of the Nabratein synagogue, discovered in archaeological excavations, indicate that it is one of the oldest in the Galilee. The original synagogue was enlarged during the third century and destroyed in an earthquake in 363 CE. In 564, the synagogue was rebuilt. The date is known from the inscription over the main door, now displayed at the Israel Museum: "Built four hundred and ninety four years after the destruction of the Temple under the leadership of Hanina ben Lizar and Luliana bar Yuden" (70+494=564). The second-phase building stood until 640 CE. The façade was partially reconstructed by the Jewish National Fund and the Israel Antiquities Authority.

== Ein Nashut synangogue ==
Excavations at Ein Nashut conducted in the late 1970s in the Golan revealed the remains of a synagogue that was built in the 5th century based on coins found at the site, and there is evidence of a series of repairs made there, which was abandoned in the 7th century CE.

== Synagogues rebuilt on ancient sites ==
Several synagogues in Israel are located on the sites of far older synagogue buildings but, because the older buildings were destroyed by non-Jewish rulers of the city, the present buildings are reconstructions.

== Ancient synagogue sites ==
A

- Anim
- Arbel
- Ashkelon
- Assaliyye

B

- Bar'am
- Beit Alfa
- Beit Guvrin
- Beit Shean
- Beit She'arim (Roman-era Jewish village)
- Belvoir

C

- Capernaum
- Caphra
- Chorazin

D

- Dabura
- Dabiyye
- Danna

E

- Ed-Dikke
- Ein Gedi
- Ein HaNetziv

G

- Gush Halav

H

- Hammat Tiberias
- Horvat Ammudim/Umm el-'Amed
- Huldah
- Horvat 'Ethri (aka Itri)
- Horvat Kishor, Southern Hebron Hills
- Huqoq
- Huseifa

J

- Japhia/Japha

K

- Kanaf
- Kefar Fahma
- Kafr Kanna
- Khirbet Rib
- Khirbet Shema
- Khirbet Wadi Hamam
- Katzrin ancient village and synagogue

M

- Maon (distinct from Tell Maon)
- Maoz Chaim
- Masada
- Meron
- Meroth, later Marus; in Upper Galilee, Jewish, Late Roman and/or Byzantnine, in military zone, Coordinates: 33°01′54″N 35°31′50″E
- Migdal

N

- Nabratein

P

- Peki'in

Q

- Qision
- Qiyuma

R

- Rehob
- Rimmon

S

- Sasa
- Sifsula
- Shura
- Sumaqa

T

- Tell Maon (distinct from Maon Synagogue)
- Tel Rekhesh, Nahal Tavor (1st-2nd c. CE)
- Tirat Zvi
- Tzippori

Y

- Yafa: see Japhia
- Yesud HaMa'ala
- Yodefat

Z

- Zumeimira

== See also ==
- Ancient synagogues in Palestine covers modern Israel, West Bank, Gaza, Golan Heights, and Transjordan
- Archaeology of Israel
