= Nabratein synagogue =

Ancient synagogue and archaeological site in Israel

- Hebrew: בית כנסת נבוריה
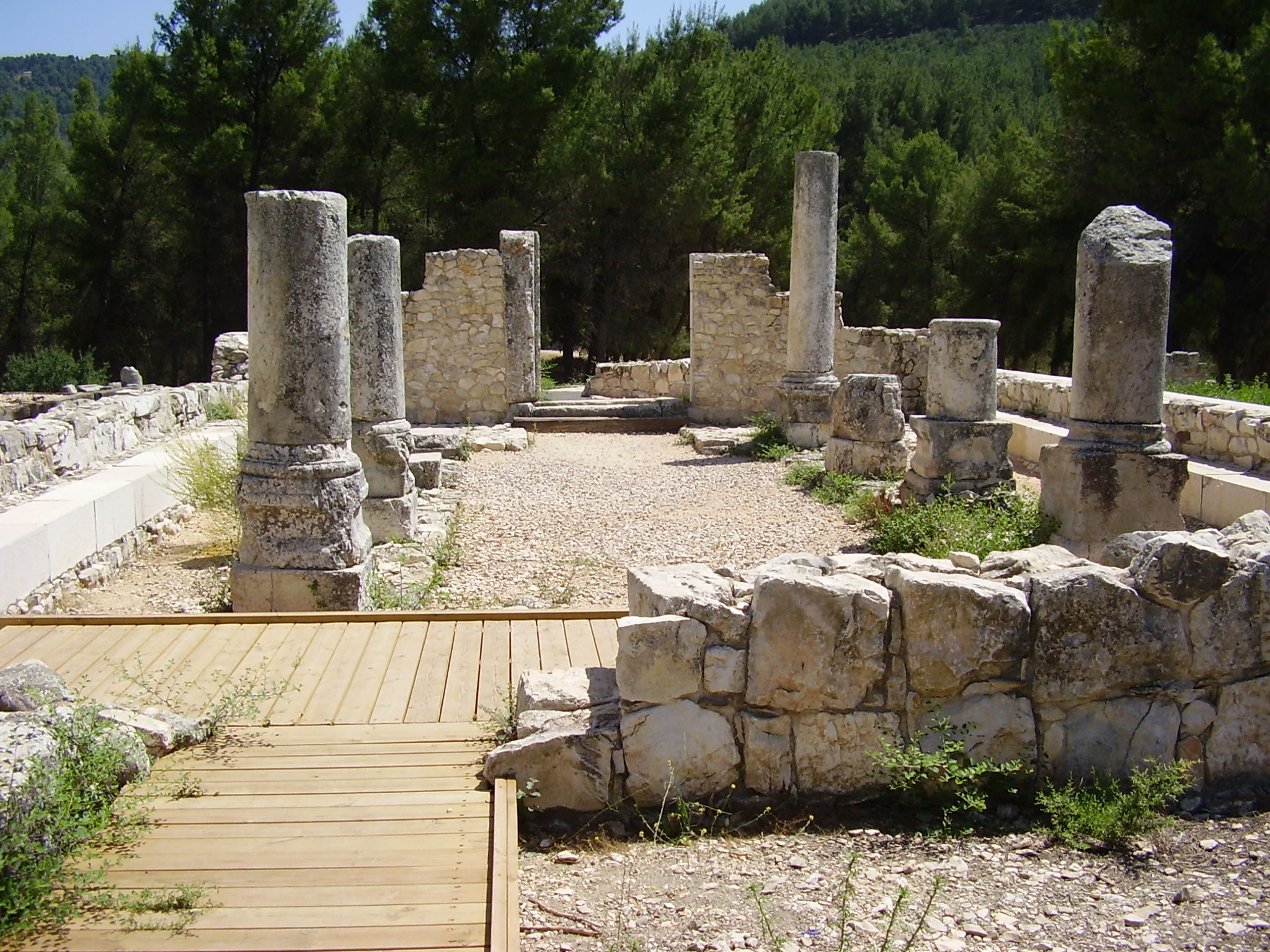
- Ruins of the former ancient synagogue, in 2008

- Location of the former ancient synagogue in northeastern Israel

Religion
- Affiliation: Judaism (former)
- Ecclesiastical or organizational status: Ancient synagogue; Archaeological site
- Status: Abandoned

Location
- Location: Safed, Upper Galilee, Northern District
- Country: Israel
- Interactive map of Nabratein synagogue
- Coordinates: 32°59′31″N 35°31′00″E

Architecture
- Completed: 2nd–6th centuries
- Materials: Stone

The Nabratein synagogue or Navoraya synagogue (Hebrew: נבוריה) is a former ancient synagogue and archaeological site, located in a pine forest northeast of Safed, in the Upper Galilee region of the Northern District of Israel.

== Background ==
Naburiya was a Jewish village in the Galilee region of the Kingdom of Israel during the First and Second Temple periods.

Neburaya, identical with Nabratein, is located north of Safed and is the place where Eleazar of Modi'im and Jacob of Kfar Neburaya, a compiler of the Haggadah, are buried.

Mishnaic scholar, R. Eleazar ha-Moda'i, is said to have been buried in Nabratein.

== History and architecture ==
The 1980-81 excavators of the Nabratein/Navoraya synagogue posited that its construction occurred in three phases: first built ("Synagogue 1") during the Middle Roman period (135–250), it was rebuilt during the Late Roman period (250–350/363) – in a first phase between 250–306 ("Synagogue 2a"), and expanded in a second phase between 306–350/363 ("Synagogue 2b"). Some researchers are skeptical about the earliest date suggested by the excavators, i.e. the late 2nd century CE, finding a later date more likely. Jodi Magness even posits that there has been only one synagogue at the site, not three successive ones, and that it hasn't been built before the second half of the 4th century.

The analysis of the excavators indicates that it is one of the oldest in the Galilee. The original synagogue was enlarged during the third century and destroyed in the Galilee earthquake of 363.

The final, and much larger, synagogue building was constructed in the late 6th century reusing stones from the earlier building. The year of its construction is known from the inscription over the main door: "According to the counting of four hundred and ninety-four years to (from) the destruction of the Temple (lit. "House"); built during the public service of Hanina son of ("ben") Lizar and Luliana son of ("bar") Yudan." (Note: In Hebrew: "למספר ארבע מאות ותישעים וארבע שנה לחרבן הבית ניבנה בסרר חנינה בן ליזר ולוליאנא בר יודן") Read as "Built 494 years after the destruction of the Temple" etc., so in 564 CE (70+494=564).

The lintel is now displayed at the Israel Museum.

The building stood until 640 CE.

== Surveys, excavations and reconstruction ==
When Lieut. Kitchener of the Palestine Exploration Fund visited the site in 1877, he found the remains of the synagogue completely leveled to the ground and its columns fallen, along with the lintel of the main entrance.

The synagogue was excavated in 1905 by Heinrich Kohl and Carl Watzinger, and again in 1980–1981 by Eric and Carol Meyers.

The façade was partially reconstructed by the Jewish National Fund and the Israel Antiquities Authority.

== Artistic legacy ==
The seven-branched Menorah surrounded by a wreath over the door of the Henry S. Frank Memorial Synagogue in Philadelphia, Pennsylvania is copied from the Nabratein synagogue.

== See also ==
- Ancient synagogues in the Palestine region – refers to the entire Palestine region/Land of Israel
  - Ancient synagogues in Israel – refers to the modern State of Israel
- Archaeology of Israel
- Oldest synagogues in the world
- Synagogal Judaism

== Gallery ==
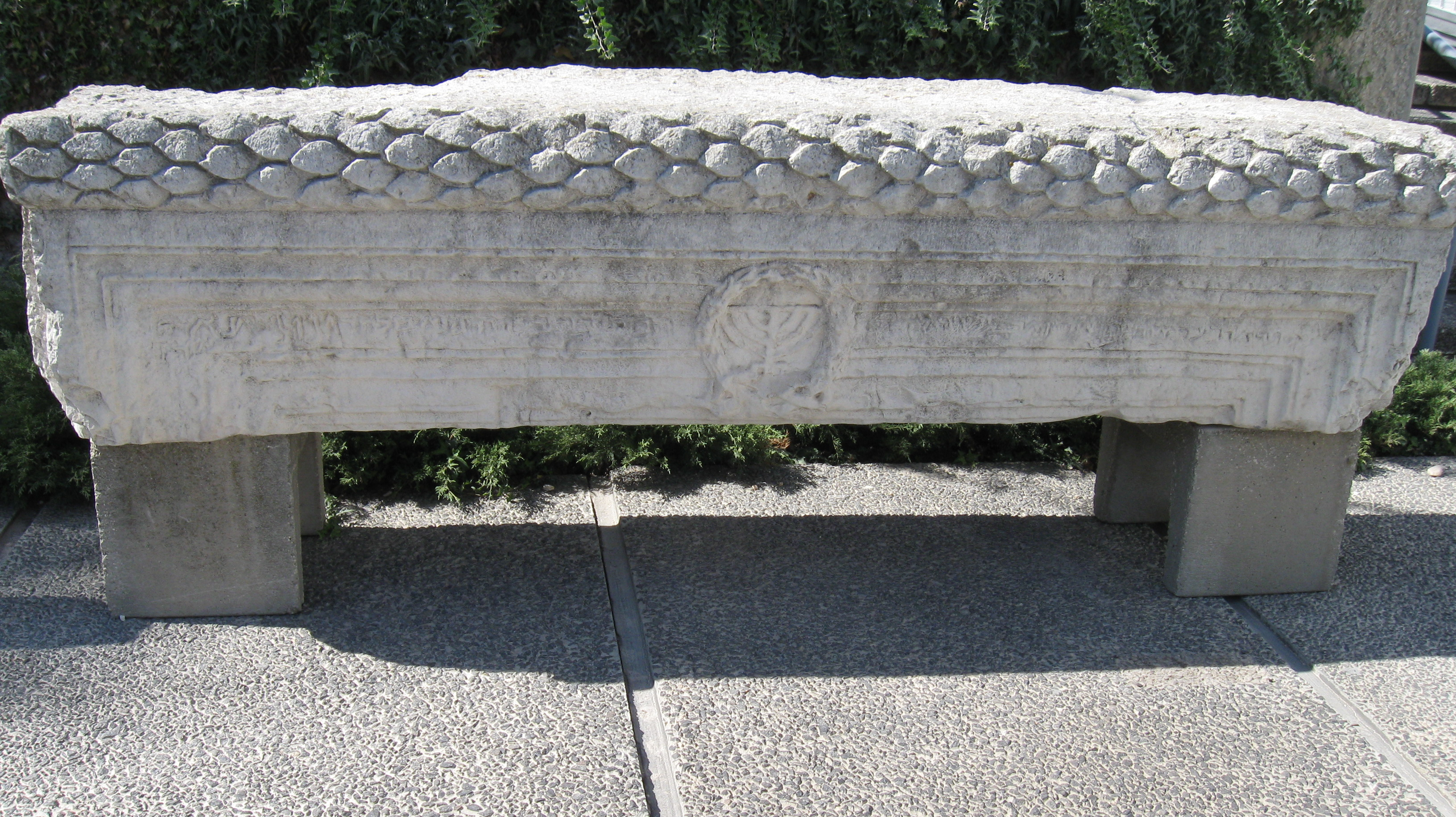
Lintel inscribed with menorah

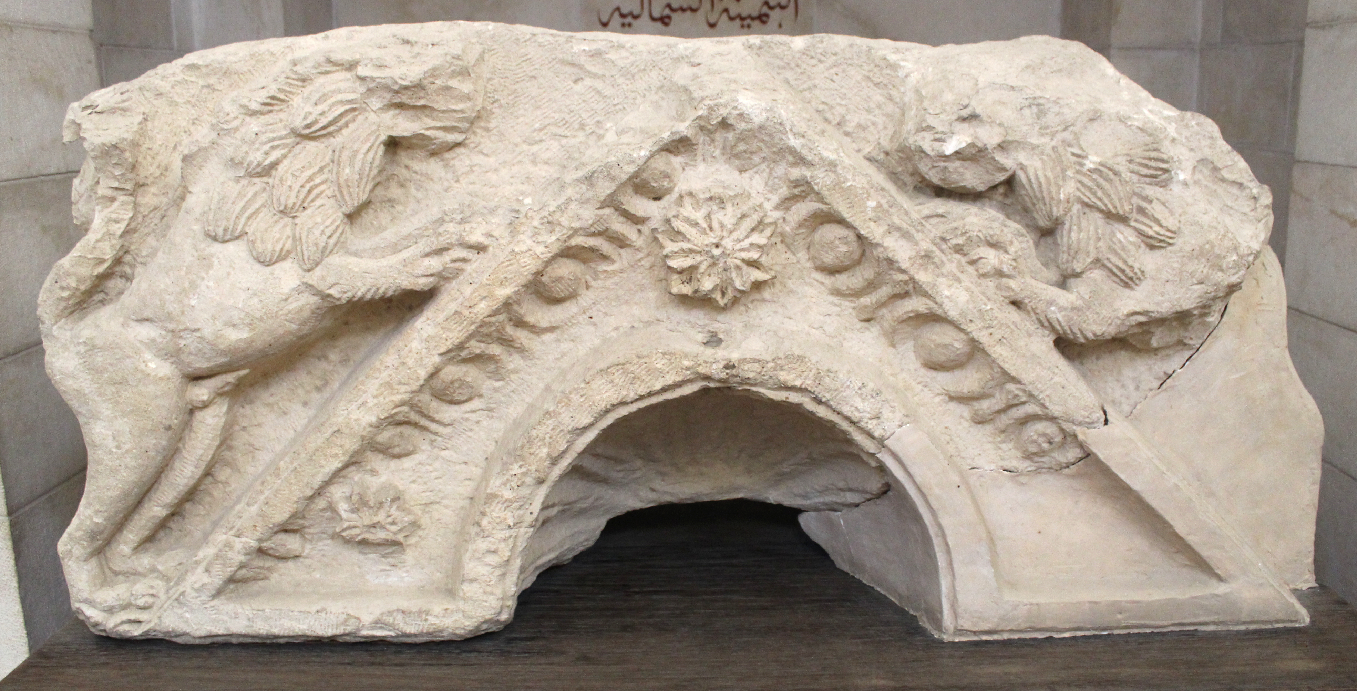
Lintel of Torah Ark – Nabratein Synagogue. Rockefeller Museum
