= Modi'im =

Modi'im may refer to:

- Modi'in (ancient city), also known historically as Modi'im
- Eleazar of Modi'im
- Mevo Modi'im
