= Henry S. Frank Memorial Synagogue =

Historic place in Philadelphia, Pennsylvania

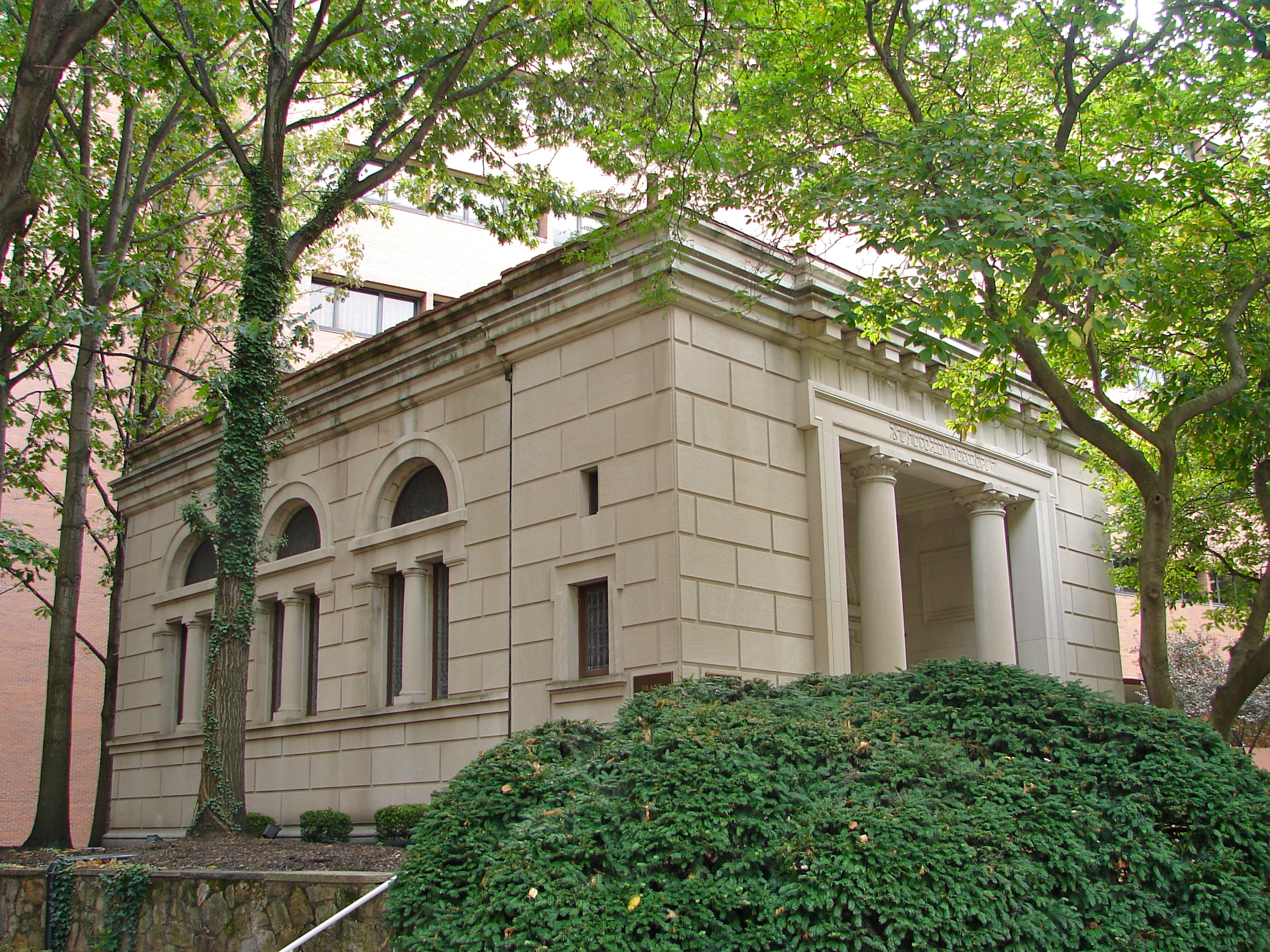
- The former synagogue, in 2010

- Location of the former synagogue in Philadelphia

Religion
- Affiliation: Judaism
- Rite: Nusach Ashkenaz
- Ecclesiastical or organizational status: Synagogue

Location
- Location: 5501 Old York Road, Philadelphia, Pennsylvania 19141
- Country: United States
- Interactive map of Henry S. Frank Memorial Synagogue
- Coordinates: 40°2′13″N 75°8′37″W

Architecture
- Architects: William R. Dougherty; Arnold W. Brunner
- Type: Synagogue architecture
- Style: Classical Revival
- Completed: 1901
- Materials: Limestone, granite, ceramic tiling
- Henry S. Frank Memorial Synagogue
- U.S. National Register of Historic Places
- NRHP reference No.: 83002267
- Added to NRHP: July 12, 1983

The Henry S. Frank Memorial Synagogue, commonly called the Frank Memorial Synagogue, is a historical synagogue on the grounds of Jefferson Einstein Hospital, in Philadelphia, Pennsylvania, United States. The synagogue was funded substantially by Rose S. Frank and named in honor of her late husband, Henry S. Frank, a philanthropist who died in 1887.

The building was added to the National Register of Historic Places in 1983.

== History ==
The synagogue was built in 1901 on the grounds of the Jewish Hospital of Philadelphia, now the Jefferson Einstein Hospital; and is the only synagogue in the world known to be located on hospital grounds.

The architect, Arnold W. Brunner, was inspired by the recent publication of images of several Roman-era synagogues in Israel, particularly the handsome and largely intact synagogue at Kfar Bar'am. Several synagogues had been studied by the British Palestine Exploration Fund and illustrations were published in the Jewish Encyclopedia.

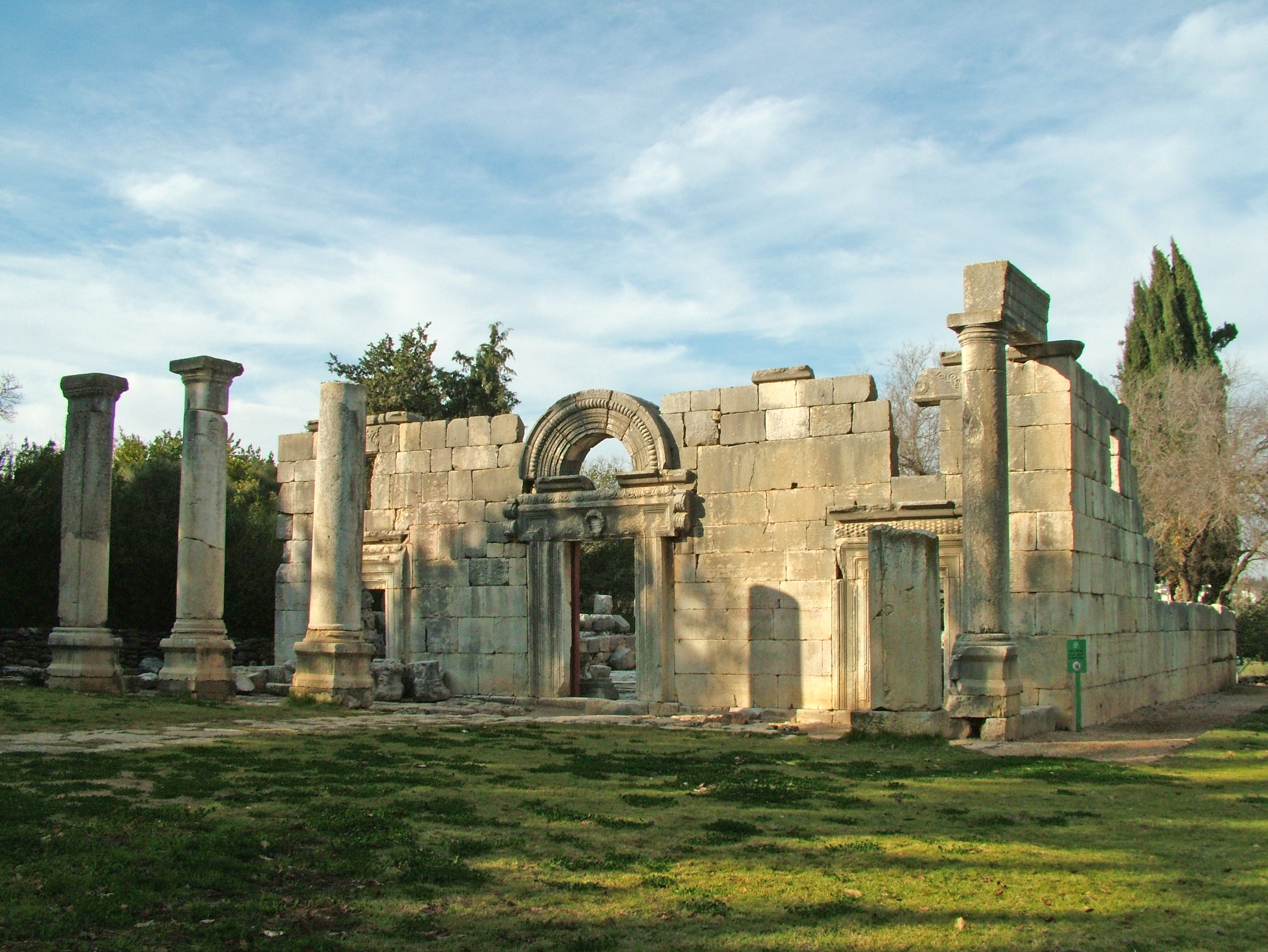
Synagogue at Kfar Bar'am

The Frank Memorial synagogue replicated the round arch of the door of the standing ruin at Kfar Bar'am, and the lintel from the smaller synagogue at Kfar Bar'am that is now in the Louvre. The inscription on the lintel is taken from that inscription and reads, in Hebrew, "Peace be upon the place, and on all the places of Israel." Over the door is a seven-branched Menorah in a wreath, copied from the ancient Nabratein synagogue. The synagogue's floors are set with mosaics, although it was built before mosaic synagogue floors had been discovered in ancient synagogues in Israel.

The supervising architect was Frank Furness, who had been the principal architect of the Jewish Hospital since 1871.

== See also ==
- History of the Jews in Pennsylvania
