= 363 Galilee earthquake =

Earthquake in the Levent region, 363 CE

Galilee earthquake of 363
- Local date: May 18 and 19, 363
- Epicenter: 32.999°N 35.366°E
- Areas affected: Syria-Palaestina province of Byzantine Empire
- Max. intensity: EMS-98 X (Very destructive)

The Galilee earthquake of 363 was a pair of severe earthquakes that shook the Galilee and nearby regions on May 18 and 19. The maximum perceived intensity for the events was estimated to be 'X' [very destructive] on the European macroseismic scale. The earthquakes occurred on the portion of the Dead Sea Transform (DST) fault system between the Dead Sea and the Gulf of Aqaba.

The earthquake severely damaged Sepphoris and Petra, while destroying the Nabratein synagogue. Roman Emperor Julian the Apostate's plan to rebuild the Temple in Jerusalem may have been cancelled in part due to the damage caused by the earthquake.

== Impact ==
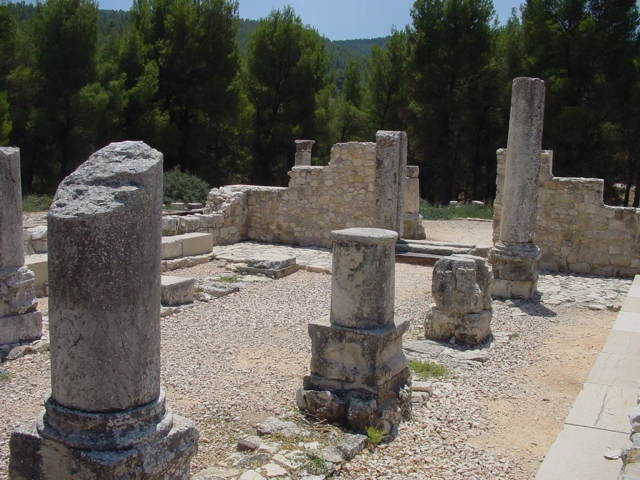
Remains of the Nabratein synagogue, 2005

Sepphoris, north-northwest of Nazareth, was severely damaged. Nabratein and the Nabratein synagogue (northeast of Safed) were destroyed.

In 363 CE, the pagan Roman emperor Julian ordered Alypius of Antioch to rebuild the Temple in Jerusalem as part of his campaign to strengthen non-Christian religions, but the attempt was unsuccessful. Early historians such as Sozomen cited the 363 Galilee earthquake as the causative agent of failure, but the death of Julian and the coming of the Christian emperor Jovian may have also played a role.

Petra, in what is now Jordan, was fatally damaged.

== See also ==
- Geography of Israel#Seismic activity
- List of historical earthquakes
- List of earthquakes in the Levant
