= Golan =

Ancient city in the Golan Heights

Coordinates: 32.9479°N 35.6612°E

Golan (Hebrew: גּוֹלָן, romanized: Gōlān) is a city of refuge mentioned in the Hebrew Bible, later known from the works of Josephus (first century CE) and Eusebius (Onomasticon, early 4th century CE). The biblical city of Golan could not be positively identified, but most researchers localize it at Sahm el-Jaulān in Syria's Daraa Governorate.

A 1954 attempt by Zev Vilnay to identify the site of Golan based on a place mentioned in the Talmud as Goblana, took him to a similarly named ruined village, ej-Jelêbîne, near the Hula Valley.

== Etymology; name and meaning throughout history ==
The name of the area is said by Brown–Driver–Briggs to derive from the triliteral Semitic root g-w-l, meaning to go around, as in a circle, leading to the sense of the word as referring to a region or district. Similarly, it is said to mean "circle" or "enclosure".

The name "Golan" is described in the Hebrew Bible as a city allocated to the half-tribe of Manasseh in the territory of Bashan that the Israelites conquered from the Amorites. Golan was designated as one of the six Cities of Refuge, the most northerly of the three cities of refuge east of the Jordan River, and was given as a Levitical city to the Gershonite Levites (Deuteronomy 4:43 "וְאֶת־גּוֹלָ֥ן בַּבָּשָׁ֖ן לַֽמְנַשִּֽׁי" "and Golan, in Bashan, belonging to the Manassites"; Joshua 20:8 "וְאֶת־גּוֹלָ֥ן בַּבָּשָׁ֖ן מִמַּטֵּ֥ה מְנַשֶּֽׁה" "and Golan in Bashan from the tribe of Manasseh"; and 1 Chronicles 6:56 (Note: The Masoretic Text of the Hebrew Bible numbers this as verse 56 of 1 Chronicles 6, while the King James Version and other Christian texts list it as verse 71) "אֶת־גּוֹלָ֥ן בַּבָּשָׁ֖ן וְאֶת־מִגְרָשֶׁ֑יהָ" "Golan in Bashan with its pasturelands").

The shift in the meaning of Golan, from a town to a broader district or territory, is first attested by the Jewish historian Josephus, who calls it Gaulanitis (Γαυλανῖτις, Gaulanîtis),. His account likely reflects Roman administrative changes implemented after the Great Jewish Revolt (66–73 CE). The name Golan Heights was not used before the 19th century.

In the Mishnah the name is the Gablān, and similarly Aramaic Guwlana and Gublānā in the Jerusalem Talmud.

The Arabic name is Jawlān, sometimes romanized as Djolan, which is an Arabized version of the Canaanite and Hebrew name. Arab cartographers of the Byzantine period sometimes refer to "Jawlan" as a mountain, though the region is a plateau.

== The village during the Roman period ==
The settlement was known to Josephus. It formed the eastern boundary of Galilee and was part of the tetrarchy of Philip. It was described by Eusebius in his Onomasticon as a large village that gave its name to the surrounding country.

Josephus mentions that Golan was conquered by Alexander Jannaeus during his final campaigns. After this, Golan does not appear in Josephus's writings, suggesting that the city had been destroyed.

== Identification ==
=== Sahem al-Jawlan and Beit Akkar ===
The location of biblical Golan is not known, researchers though suggest it to be at modern-day Sahm el-Jaulān, a Syrian village east of Wadi 'Allan in the Daraa Governorate, where early Byzantine ruins were found.

Beit Akkar is a tell (or archaeological mound) on a rocky elevation situated between two streams, Nahr el-'Allan and a smaller wadi, both creating seasonal waterfalls. Gottlieb Schumacher described it in 1886 in "Across the Jordan", and its proximity to Saham al-Jawlan led to many scholars considering it to be the biblical city of Golan.

According to Yoel Elitsur, this is an incorrect understanding of the name Sahem al-Jawlan, which should be understood to mean the Sahem of the Golan as opposed to Saham Al Kfara near Irbid.

=== Kh. ej-Jelêbîne near the Hula Valley ===
In 1954, Israeli historical geographer Zev Vilnay had tentatively identified the town of Golan with the Goblana (Gaulan) of the Talmud, which he thought to be the ruin ej-Jelêbîne on the Wâdy Dabûra, a wadi near the Lake of Huleh, by way of a corruption of the site's original name. According to Vilnay, the village took its name from the district Gaulanitis (Golan). The ruin of Khirbet ej-Jelêbîne is not far from the Daughters of Jacob Bridge. The traces of the town were described by Gottlieb Schumacher in the late 19th century as being "a desert ruin", having "no visible remains of importance, but [having] the appearance of great antiquity."

== The region in antiquity ==
=== Persian period ===
During the Persian period (c. 539–332 BCE), the Golan region, together with the Bashan, formed the satrapy of Karnaim.

=== Hellenistic period ===
During much of the Hellenistic period, the region was part of the Seleucid Empire. Now named Gaulanitis, the area formed a district all by itself during the early Hellenistic period. Once the Seleucid Empire started its gradual collapse, the Golan became a target for Iturean and other Arab tribes. At the same time it was enveloped by the regional wars fought by Hasmonean ruler Alexander Jannaeus (r. 103-76 BCE) against the Nabatean kings Obodas I and Aretas III between c. 93–80 BCE, leading to the conquest of the Golan by Jannaeus.

=== Early Roman period ===
In 63 BCE, the entire former Seleucid realm was conquered by Roman general Pompey, and the Golan was settled by the Itureans. In 23 BCE, the Jewish king Herod the Great, a client ruler loyal to Rome, was granted the rule over the wider Hauran region. He left it to his heirs, who held it until the death of Agrippa II at the end of the first century CE.

=== Late Roman and Byzantine periods ===
The wider Golan region was prosperous between the 2nd and the 7th century CE, when pagan communities were gradually replaced by Christian ones. A different view is that the Christians of the Golan were Ghassanids, an Arab tribe originally from Yemen, used by the Byzantines as frontier guards since the end of the 5th century. An important Jewish presence was attested by archaeology since the Roman period in the Golan, and by the 6th century the population of the Byzantine Golan was made up of Jews and Christian Ghassanids. Excavations at Ein Nashut provide evidence of a Jewish community and a synagogue that operated from the 5th century CE to the 7th century CE.

The Golan was prosperous during the Roman and Byzantine periods, but had a purely rural character and lacked any larger towns.
