= Rabbinic period =

Period in Jewish history, c. 70 CE–638 CE

Rabbinic period (Talmudic period)
- 70 CE – 638 CE
Second Temple period	Medieval period
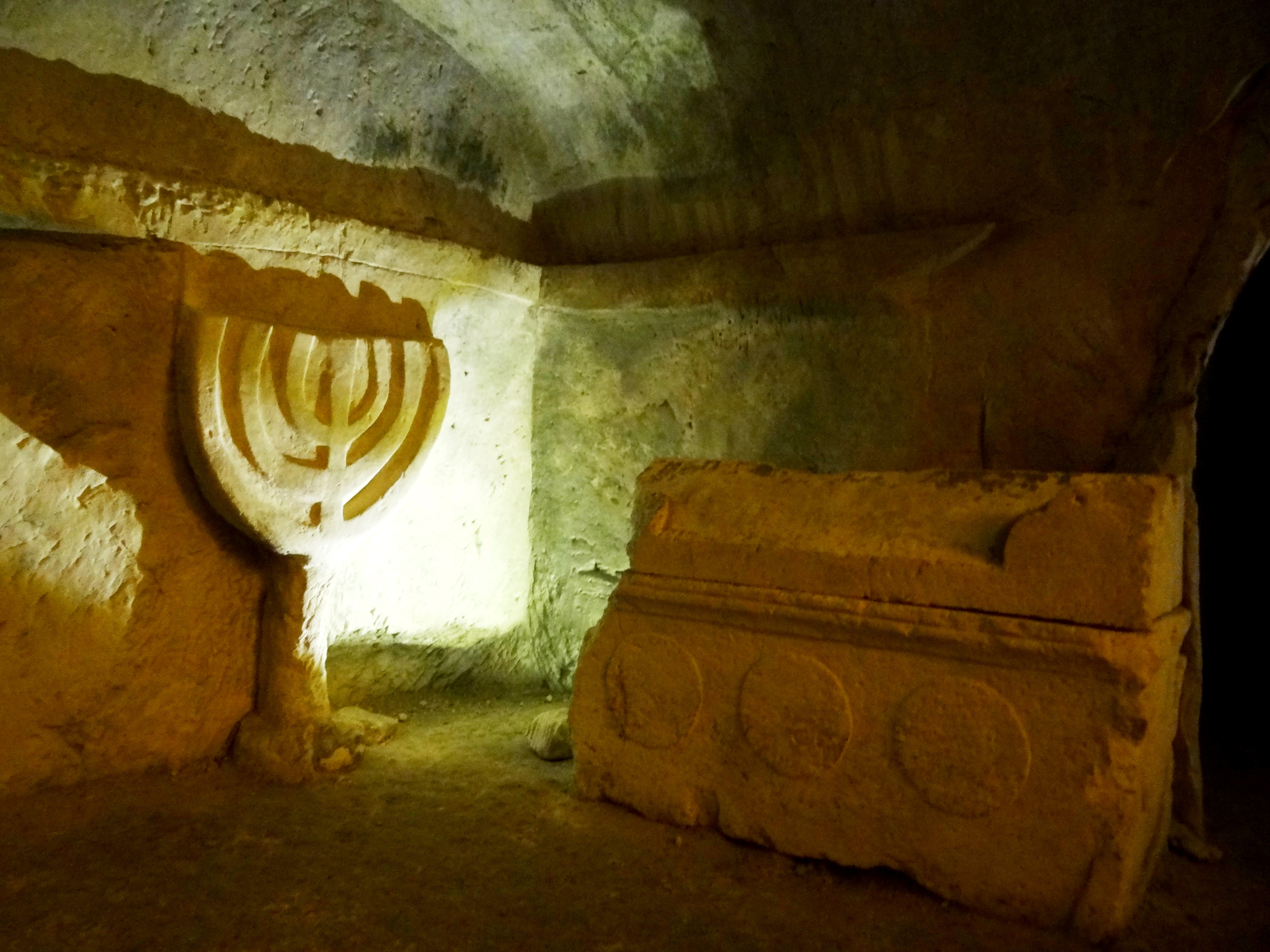
- A menorah relief in the Cave of the Coffins, Beit She'arim necropolis
- Duration: c. 6 centuries
- Location: Land of Israel (Southern Levant); Eastern diaspora: Babylonia and other Sasanian territories; Western diaspora: Mediterranean Basin, Western Europe, North Africa; Arabian Peninsula
- Leaders: Patriarchs; Exilarchs
- Key events: Diaspora Revolt; Bar Kokhba Revolt; Compilation of the Mishnah; Crisis of the Third Century; Revolt against Gallus; Temple project; Compilation of the Talmuds; Revolt against Heraclius; Early Muslim conquests

The Rabbinic period, or the Talmudic period, denotes a transformative era in Jewish history, spanning from the destruction of the Second Temple in 70 CE to the Muslim conquest in 638 CE. Pivotal in shaping Judaism into its classical form, it is regarded as the second most important era in Jewish history after the Biblical period.

After the failure of the Great Jewish Revolt of 66–73 CE, Roman measures such as the fiscus Judaicus (Latin for 'Jewish tax') and land confiscation severely impacted the Jewish population of Judaea. The destruction of Jerusalem and the Temple required Jewish culture to adapt in order to survive. Judaism endured through the establishment of new centers of scholarship and leadership, initially at Yavne under Yohanan ben Zakkai, who promoted a focus on Torah study and synagogue worship. The next decades also saw the Jewish response to several catastrophic events, including the failed Diaspora uprisings of 115–117 CE and the Bar Kokhba revolt of 132–135 CE, a failed bid for the reestablishment of an independent Jewish state in Judaea. The suppression of these revolts by the Romans led to the devastation of Judea proper as well as diaspora communities, the death and enslavement of many Jews, further displacement, and economic hardship. Despite these challenges, Jewish communal life continued to thrive, particularly in the Galilee, which became a major center of Jewish life and scholarship. The authority of the Patriarchs was instrumental in maintaining Jewish continuity during this transformative period.

During the later Rabbinic period, the Jewish population in the Land of Israel continued to decline under Christianized Roman rule. Jews started facing discriminatory laws and religious persecution, and many emigrated from the country, eventually establishing flourishing Diaspora communities. From the 3rd century onward, the Jewish community in Babylonia became a central hub of Jewish life, benefiting from a relatively tolerant environment under the Sasanian Empire. Contemporary estimates frequently place the Babylonian Jewish population during this period at approximately one million, establishing it as the largest Jewish diaspora community of the time. This period of economic prosperity and political freedom allowed the Babylonian Jewish community, led by the Exilarch, to thrive and foster significant theological and literary developments. During the Rabbinic period, Jewish communities were also present in various regions of the Mediterranean, including Egypt, North Africa, Asia Minor, Italy, and the Iberian Peninsula.

The Rabbinic period was consequential in the ongoing development of Judaism and its traditions. During this time, the Jewish religious practice transitioned from a focus on the Temple and sacrificial practices to a greater emphasis on Halakha (Jewish law) and Aggadah (biblical interpretation). This period saw the creation of major texts of rabbinic literature, such as the Mishnah, Tosefta, Jerusalem Talmud, Babylonian Talmud, and various midrashim (biblical commentaries). Jews maintained their cultural and religious identity by continuing to speak and write in Hebrew and Aramaic, and developed liturgy, including piyyutim (liturgical poetry). They set up synagogues and yeshivas, engaged in mysticism, and hoped for the Messiah to bring their exile to an end.

== History ==
=== Aftermath of the destruction ===
The First Jewish–Roman War took a heavy toll on the Jewish people in the Land of Israel. Approximately one quarter of the Jewish population in Judaea was killed in the fighting and its aftermath and about one tenth was taken into captivity. The Temple, as a national and administrative center of Jewish life and worship was demolished, Jerusalem was destroyed, and the autonomous positions of the Sanhedrin and the High-priesthood were rendered null and void. The social structure prior to the destruction collapsed and the factions of the Sadducees and the Essenes disappeared. On the other hand, the status of the Jews as a people recognized as a nation in the Roman Empire remained, as did their freedom to follow their faith and religious law. Vespasian placed an additional tax of two Dinar for each Jew, the fiscus Judaicus (Latin for 'Jewish tax'), creating a financial burden on Jews and meant to humiliate them. The Romans also confiscated land from Jews.

=== New beginnings ===
Around the period of the destruction of the Temple, Yohanan ben Zakkai (Ribaz) moved from Jerusalem to Yavneh, a small town on the coast, where he established a new center of leadership. The Rabbinic movement adopted and further developed the Pharisee approach to Halakha.

This new movement put an emphasis on Torah study, and prayer and the Synagogue emerged as the center of community life. At this stage, the center of Jewish leadership was still in the Land of Israel, although it would eventually move to Babylonia. Although Yohanan ben Zakkai made certain decrees "to remember the Temple", his general approach was to continue observing Judaism regardless of the Temple or lack thereof.

Ribaz was replaced by Gamaliel II, who sought to maintain ties with the diaspora by visiting communities abroad and welcoming visitors to Yavneh for study and consultation.

Within the Jewish community, prestige and authority was given to the nasi (patriarch). But this authority was challenged by rabbis several times until Rabbi Judah ha-Nasi consolidated his authority as both the patriarch and religious leader.

=== Bar Kokhba revolt ===
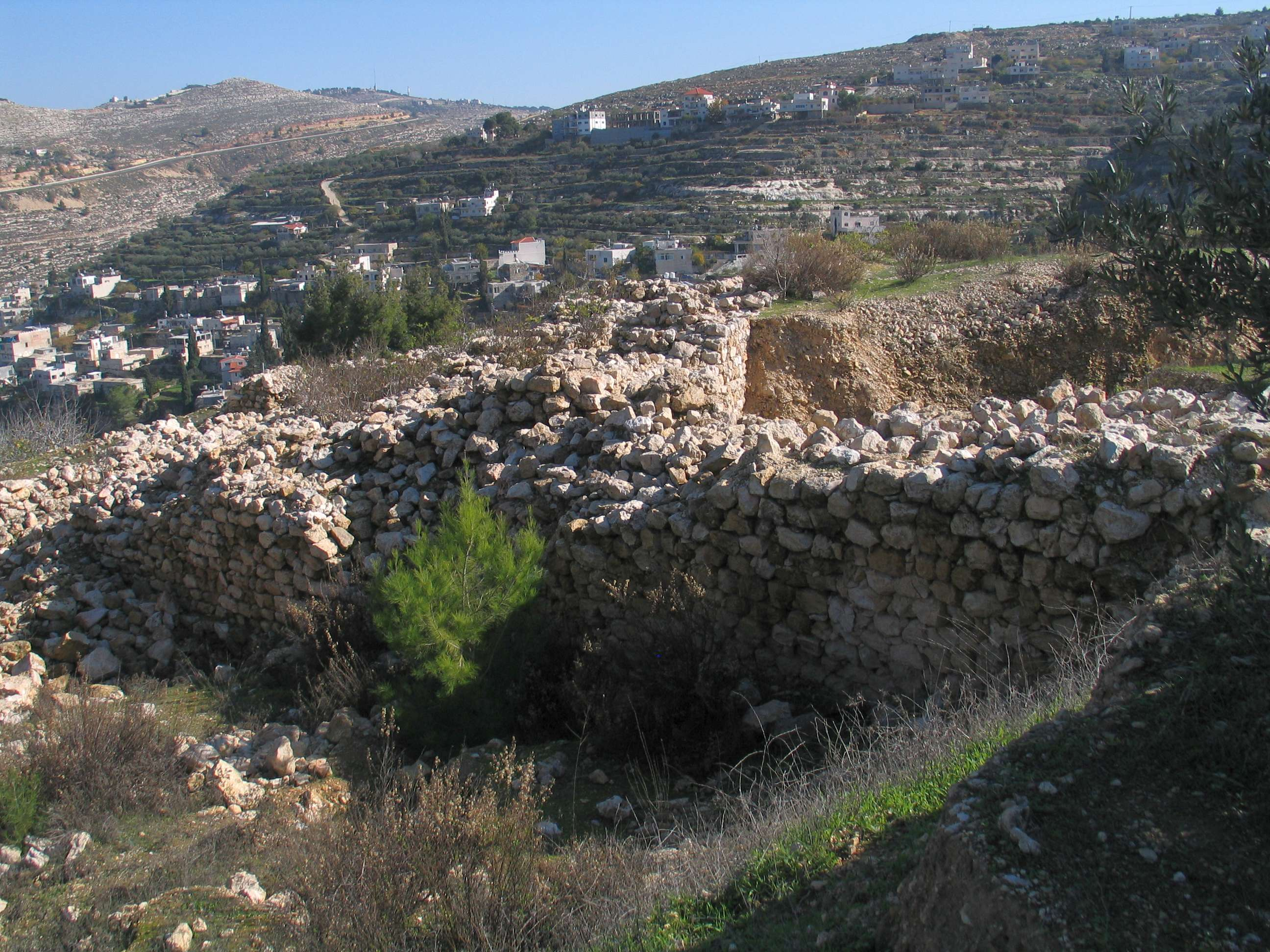
Ruined walls of the Beitar fortress, the last stand of Bar Kokhba

Between 132–135 CE, the Jews made their last serious attempt to regain their independence in the form of the Bar Kokhba revolt. The Rabbis made an effort to unify the people under Bar Kokhba. The rabbinic leaders understood that such a revolt had no chance of surviving without unity within the Jewish community, and they put much effort into unifying the people behind Bar Kokhba. The failure of the revolt led to many casualties, as well as an economic downturn that caused many Jews to migrate to the Galilee and outside of Israel. In fact, Jews were prohibited from living in the area surrounding Jerusalem during this period; nevertheless, this prohibition was not always enforced, and there appears to have been a small Jewish community that established itself in Jerusalem around the end of the second century.

=== The emergence of the patriarchate ===
The Talmud describes the ten places where the Sanhedrin was exiled, the later places - namely Usha, Shefa-Amr, Beit She'arim, Sepphoris, and Tiberias being in the Galilee. These exiles lasted a total of about one hundred years. The population of Judea also migrated to the north during this period, making the Galilee the center of Jewish life during this time. Following the Bar Kokhba revolt around 140 CE, when the Sanhedrin was located in Usha, Simeon ben Gamaliel II took its leadership in the form of the Patriarch. This title was passed down from father to son from then on. Although Gamaliel II, his father, is also referred to as "Patriarch", this title may be simply applying the family title retroactively.)

Around 200 CE, the Mishnah, the foundational collection of Jewish oral law, was redacted in Galilee under Rabbi Judah ha-Nasi. His title, Nasi (or Patriarch), designated him as the head of the Jewish community recognized by Roman authorities; Rabbinic texts also attest to his Davidic lineage. His period coincided with the rule of the Severan dynasty, during which Jewish–Roman relations reached their most favorable point. According to Jerome, both Septimius Severus and Caracalla "very greatly cherished the Jews."

Rabbinic literature records cordial relations between Judah ha-Nasi's household and the imperial family, supported by archaeological evidence of synagogues and other structures dedicated to members of the dynasty, as at Qision. In 248 CE, the Christian scholar Origen wrote to Julius Africanus that the Jewish ethnarchs held power comparable to kings and had the authority to condemn individuals to death:

Now, for instance, that the Romans rule, and the Jews pay the two drachmas to them, we who have had experience of it know how much power the ethnarches has among them and that differs in little from a king of the nation. Trials are held according to the law, and some are condemned to death. And though there is not full permission for this, still it is not done without the knowledge of the ruler.

The Patriarchs managed to stabilize the economy; in light of the many fields that were left empty following the revolt, they made decrees allowing the owners to reclaim them. To preserve the upper hand of the Talmudic academies in Syria Palaestina, the Patriarchate clarified to the community of Lower Mesopotamia, known to Jews as "Babylonia", that the calendar can only be established in the Land of Israel.

=== Decline of the Jewish community in the Land of Israel ===
The third century was marked by instability, anarchy, and economic hardship. Later, the rise of Christianity, which was officially recognized by Emperor Constantine in 313, led to anti-Jewish imperial legislation. In 351–352, the Jews of Galilee launched another revolt, provoking severe retribution. Relations briefly improved under Emperor Julian, who opposed Christianity and, in 363, ordered the reconstruction of the Jewish Temple as part of his policy of religious pluralism. However, Julian was killed later that year, and the project came to an end.

The fortunes of the Jews in the Land of Israel changed significantly under Byzantine rule. Between the 4th and 7th centuries, the region ceased to be predominantly Jewish, as much of the non-Jewish population had converted to Christianity. The decline and eventual disappearance of the patriarchate, which several scholars suggest occurred around 425 CE, led to the loss of central Jewish leadership, while their spiritual academies (yeshivot) also diminished. Decentralization increased the prominence of local communities centered around synagogues. This period also saw attacks on Jews and synagogue burnings by fanatical monks, such as Barsauma of Nisibis and his followers. In 438, Empress Eudocia reportedly rescinded the ban on Jewish prayer in Jerusalem, prompting Jewish leaders in Galilee to proclaim to the "great and powerful people of the Jews" that "the time of dispersion... has ended." According to the Life of Barsauma, when Jews assembled on the Temple Mount, the monk and his followers disrupted the gathering in a confrontation that left many dead, and Jews were again excluded from the city.

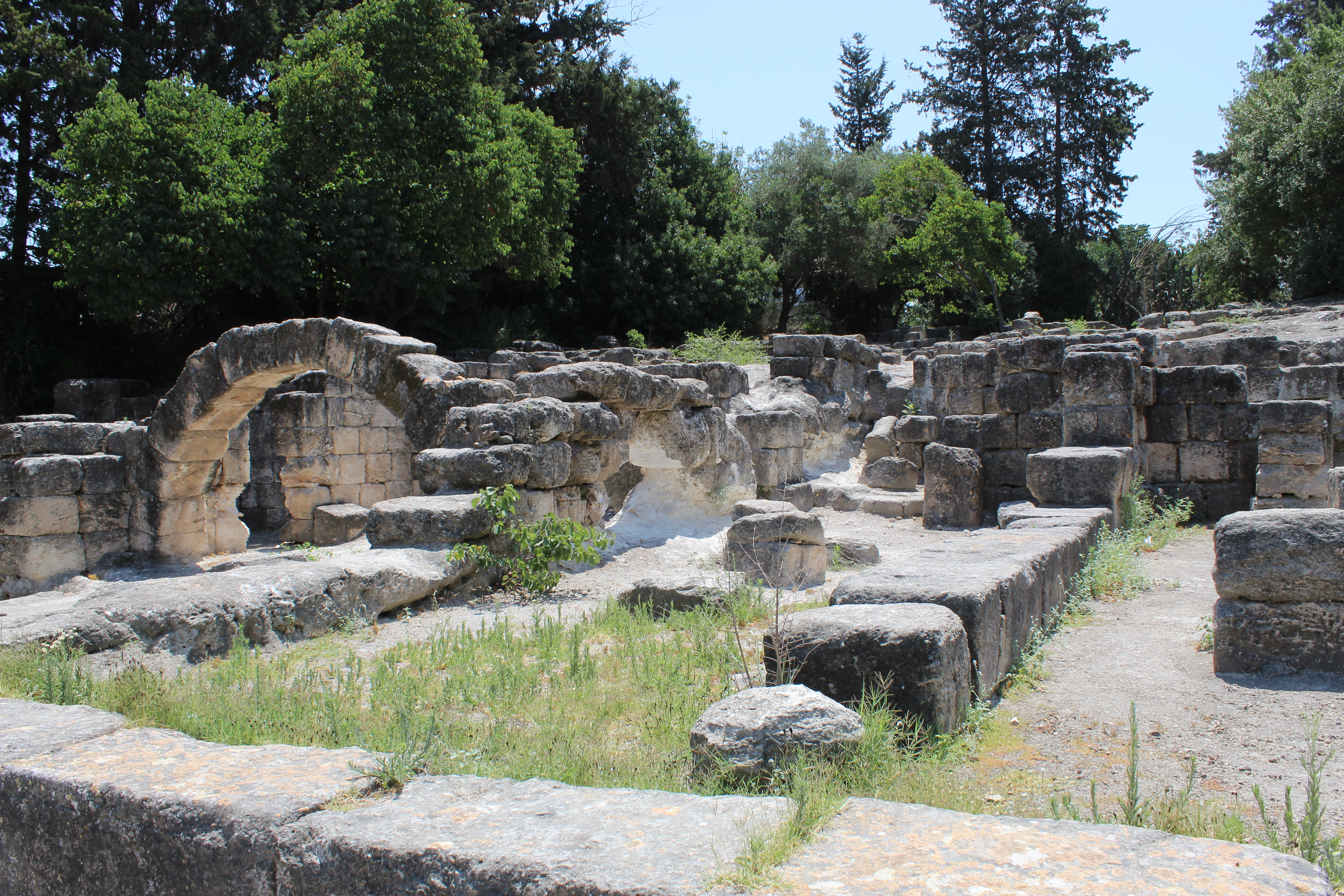
Beit Shearim, one of the galilean locations of the Sanhedrin

In 553, Byzantine emperor Justinian issued a decree banning the study of the Mishnah and mandating the use of the Septuagint or Aquila's translation for biblical readings, part of his campaign to convert Jews to Christianity. This marked a decline in the influence of the Jewish community in Palestine, reflected in the cessation of scholarly exchange with Babylon. In the 9th century, Pirqoi ben Baboi described the dire conditions for Jews under Christian rule, contrasting it with the flourishing Torah study in Babylonia:

Thus, said Mar Yehudai of blessed memory: religious persecution was decreed upon the Jews of the Land of Israel—that they should not recite the Shema and should not pray, because the [...] evil Edom [Rome, Byzantium] decreed, religious persecution against the Land of Israel that they should not read the Torah, and they hid away all the Torah scrolls because they would burn them."

It is likely that the Samaritan revolt of 555/6 was joined by the Jewish community of Palaestina Prima, which had also suffered religious suppression under Emperor Justinian. In anticipation of a national restoration, Jews allied with the Sasanian Empire, participating in the 614 invasion of Palaestina Prima which overwhelmed the Byzantine garrison. For a brief period, Jews resettled Jerusalem and renewed worship on the Temple Mount. This autonomy ended with the Byzantine reconquest in 628, which resulted in the persecution, expulsion, or death of many Jews. Within a decade, however, the Muslim conquest of the Levant inaugurated a new era in the region's history.

=== The establishment of Babylonia as the center of the Jewish world ===
The origins of the Jewish community in Babylonia go back to the Babylonian exile. Beginning in the 3rd century, Lower Mesopotamia became the center of the Jewish world. Babylon was the only major Jewish community outside of the Roman Empire, which attracted Jews and influenced their spiritual world. With estimates around one million, the community under the Sasanian Empire from the 3rd to 7th centuries is thought to have been the world's largest diasporic population, possibly exceeding the number in the Land of Israel.

As the influence of the Jewish community in the Land of Israel over the Diaspora waned, Babylonian leadership emerged as the central authority for Jewish cultural and political matters by the Early Muslim conquests. This process of reorientation occurred throughout the Western Diaspora. Epigraphic evidence from Southern Italy and Spain, including references at Venosa to emissaries and rabbis with Eastern names, suggests that institutional links between Western communities and the rabbinic centers in Galilee and Babylonia were maintained well into the 6th century. The final abolition of the Patriarchate in Galilee eventually redirected the Western Diaspora to look toward Babylonia for legal and spiritual leadership.

=== Other diaspora communities ===
By the late 3rd century, Jewish communities had re-established themselves in Egypt following their near-elimination during the Diaspora Revolt in the early 2nd century. This period witnessed a significant increase in Jewish immigration from Palestine, as supported by the growing number of Jewish texts and documents written in Hebrew and Aramaic during the 4th and 5th centuries. Additional evidence of a demographic shift in the fourth and fifth centuries can be found in the re-establishment of a Jewish population in Cyrenaica. This community appears to have been settled by immigrants from both Palestine and the growing Jewish communities in Egypt.

The western Diaspora communities of Italy, Sicily, Sardinia, Spain, North Africa, and Greece underwent a process of religious and cultural transformation between the 2nd and 7th centuries CE. Following the destruction of the Jerusalem Temple, epigraphic evidence reveals a Diaspora-wide surge in explicit Jewish self-identification and the gradual diffusion of rabbinic halakhah from the centers in Palaestina and Babylonia. This "Hebraisation", as titled by archaeologist Anna Collar, was expressed through the increased use of Jewish symbols such as the menorah, shofar, lulav, and etrog, as well as the adoption of biblically derived Hebrew names to replace or supplement common Greek and Latin ones, among Jewish communities in the West. Furthermore, the period saw a rise in the use of passages in Hebrew and honorific titles referencing Torah observance. While this process was neither uniform nor instantaneous, by the 5th and 6th centuries, it had reached communities as distant as the Iberian Peninsula and the Black Sea. The abolition of the Patriarchate in Galilee eventually reoriented western communities toward Babylonian authority. Inscriptions from Venosa, Italy, which mention emissaries sent from the East, suggest that active institutional links were maintained during this transition. By the close of the period, the Hellenized Judaism characteristic of the western diaspora during the Roman era had largely been replaced by the rabbinic, Hebrew-oriented Judaism of the medieval period.

== Rabbinic literature ==
In addition to the synagogue, the study hall (bet medrash) played an essential role in the development of Judaism. The sages composed liturgy (piyyutim), targum, and most importantly codified the Halakha and Aggadah. Halakha is the corpus of Jewish laws, and every matter is carefully considered. The Talmud contains not just the final ruling which is codified as binding law, but also the discussions that lead to that conclusion. The major Halachic works are Mishnah and Tosefta (1st–2nd centuries), Babylonian Talmud and Jerusalem Talmud (3rd to 6th centuries), as well as Halakhic midrashim. These inspired later discussions and codifications of Jewish law such as Maimonides in his Mishneh Torah and Rabbi Yosef Karo in his Shulchan Aruch. Aggadah contains interpretations of Biblical stories. It is dispersed tangentially throughout the Talmud, and it also appears in Midrashim such as Genesis Rabbah.

== Daily life ==
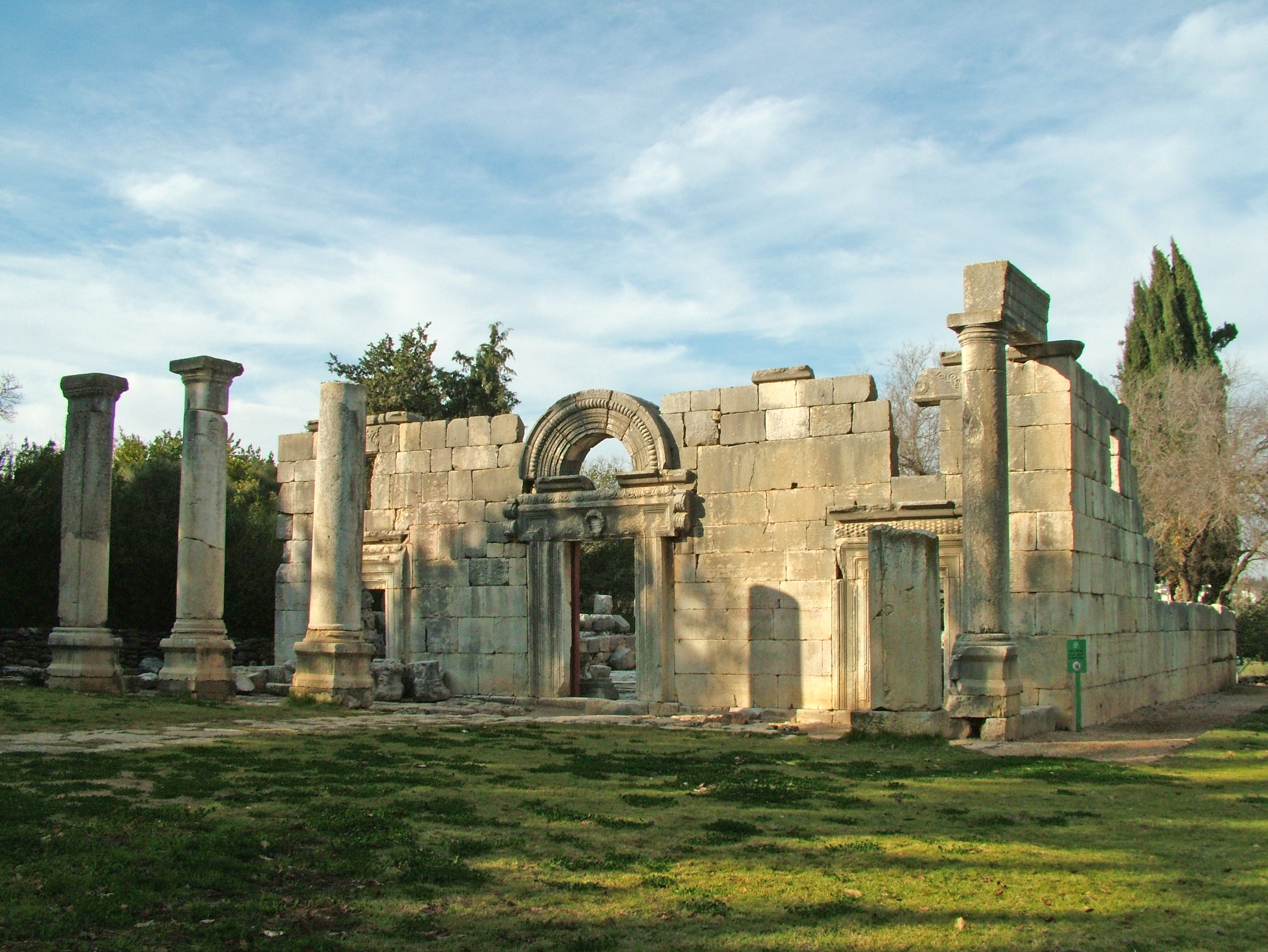
Ruins of the Kfar Bar'am synagogue, Upper Galilee

In the Land of Israel, while some Jews lived in towns such as Tiberias, Sepphoris, Caesarea and Lydda, most lived in "villages" with populations ranging from 2,000 to 5,000. Thus, the economy remained similar to what it had been in the Second Temple period. The archeological discovery of many presses indicates that there were large wine and oil industries, and fishing was also common. As Jews moved towards the coast, many began to engage in commerce, primarily with port towns in Lebanon and Syria.

The Jerusalem Talmud advises that Jews should reside only in towns that possess essential public amenities such as a medical doctor, a public bathhouse, a municipal kitchen garden, a synagogue, a study hall, as well as access to water through aqueducts and wells.

Villages were governed by seven archons, who were authorized to buy and sell public property, including the Synagogue. There was a concept of "citizenship", with a distinction between permanent and temporary residents. Taxes were collected to finance the Synagogue building, the Torah scrolls, maintaining public property, and paying for public officials such as the market inspector, the synagogue officer, city guards, and school teachers. There is evidence for some kind of institutions for elementary religious education.

=== Magical practices ===
In Late Antiquity, Jewish magical practices are attested through textual and material evidence from the Levant and Mesopotamia. In the Levant, various amulets were discovered, usually thin metal sheets (lemallae) or sometimes scratched onto ceramic sherds. These were typically commissioned for specific clients, serving protective (apotropaic), healing, and generally favorable functions, often involving adjurations of angels and demons and citations of biblical verses. The Jewish community of Palaestina also engaged in other forms of magic, such as binding and erotic spells. One notable example is the bronze defixio (binding spell) found beneath the threshold of the Meroth synagogue in Upper Galilee, which contained a plea for the entire community to be subdued, broken, and fallen before its commissioner, Yose son of Zenobia. Similarly, the use of love magic is attested by an Aramaic text scratched onto ceramic sherds found near the synagogal complex of Horvat Rimmon in southern Judea, intended to make a victim "burn in love" for the agent.

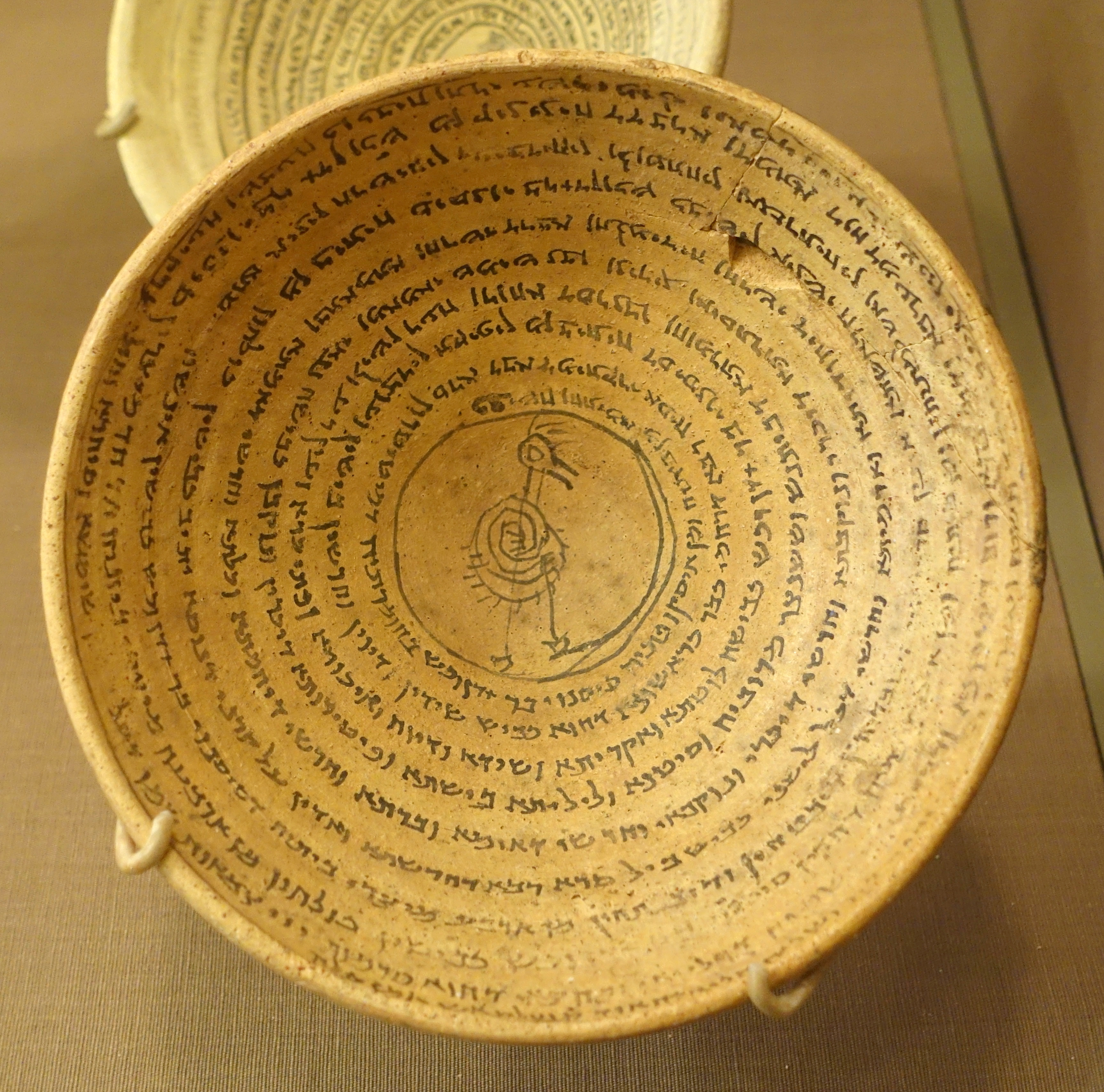
Aramaic-language incantation bowl, discovered in Nippur, southern Iraq

Meanwhile, the Jews of Babylonia left behind a corpus of a different magical medium: thousands of inscribed clay incantation bowls. Written in Jewish Babylonian Aramaic, these bowls were typically apotropaic "demon traps," intended to attract and bind evil entities, and were often found inverted or glued together within domestic settings. While influences from non-Jewish Mesopotamian traditions are evident, Jewish scribes were careful to omit references to pagan deities. In addition, Jewish magical knowledge was formalized in specialized manuals and works. One of the best-known compositions is Sefer HaRazim ("The Book of Secrets"), which provides recipes and instructions and is thought to date to the 5th or 6th century. The persistent reappearance of specific formulas and recipes (such as those from the love charm of Horvat Rimmon), in medieval texts (including some preserved in the Cairo Genizah) points to a degree of textual continuity in the Jewish magical tradition stretching from Late Antiquity.

=== Identity ===
The Jews never lost their standing as a recognized people following the First Jewish Revolt, despite Mommsen's once-influential suggestion to the contrary. Greek and Latin authors writing in the late first and second centuries CE continued to describe Jews as a gens or ethnos without hesitation: Tacitus applies gens to Jews repeatedly in his Histories, while Suetonius, Arrian, and Appian all reach for the equivalent term people. Origen, the Christian theologian writing in the first half of the third century, when describing the Jewish patriarchate, treats the Jews as an ethnos. The terms natio and ethnos were flexible during this period, applied to both peoples and provincial populations, with cultural and social markers dominant in such definitions rather than real or imagined common descent. However, within this structure, the Jews formed an exception, for their common identity rested not on language, but on religion and kinship, the very component that Christianity discarded to ease its spread among the Gentiles.

== See also ==
- Chazal – Jewish sages of the Mishna, Tosefta and Talmud eras

== Bibliography ==
- deSilva, David A. (2024). Judea under Greek and Roman Rule. Oxford University Press. ISBN 978-0-190-26328-7.
- Oppenheimer, Aharon (2023). "The Ban on Circumcision as a Cause of the Revolt: A Reconsideration". In Friedman, David A.; Czajkowski, Kimberley (eds.). Looking In, Looking Out: Jews and Non-Jews in Mutual Contemplation. Supplements to the Journal for the Study of Judaism. Vol. 212. Brill. pp. 38–57. doi:10.1163/9789004685055_004. ISBN 9789004685055.
- Safrai, Shmuel (1976). "The Era of the Mishnah and Talmud (70–640)". In Ben-Sasson, H.H. (ed.). A History of the Jewish People. Harvard University Press. pp. 307–382. ISBN 0-674-39730-4.
- Sivan, Hagith (2008). Palestine in Late Antiquity. Oxford University Press. ISBN 978-019928417-7. Archived from the original on 11 November 2024.
