= Ein Nashut =

Ancient synagogue and archaeological site in the Golan Heights, Syria

Ein Neshut synagogue
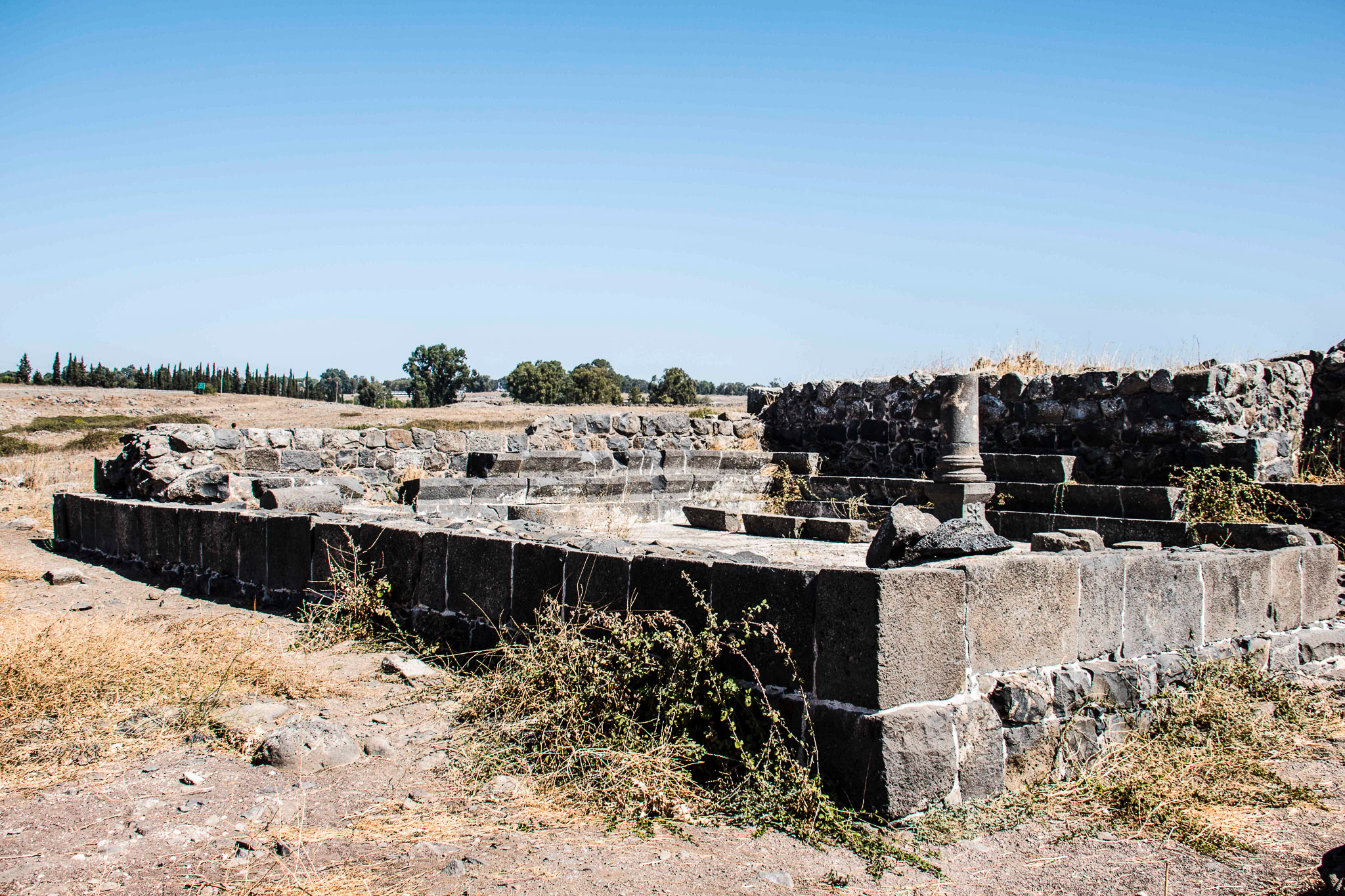
- The ancient synagogue remains, in 2016

- Location of the ancient synagogue in the Golan Heights

Religion
- Affiliation: Judaism (former)
- Ecclesiastical or organizational status: Ancient synagogue; Archaeological site
- Status: Ruins

Location
- Location: near Katzrin, Golan Heights
- Country: Israel
- Interactive map of Ein Neshut synagogue
- Coordinates: 33°0′47.2″N 35°41′31.9″E

Architecture
- Completed: c. 5th century CE
- Interior area: 10 by 11 m (33 by 36 ft)

Ein Neshut is an archaeological site where remains of a Jewish settlement from the Talmudic period and an ancient synagogue were discovered in the center of the Golan Heights that were in use from the 5th century CE to the 7th century, when the site was abandoned.

== Geography ==
The site is located on a hill 392 m (1,286 ft) above sea level, approximately 1.5 km (0.93 mi) north of Katzrin and a similar distance south of the settlement of Kidmat Tzvi, just above the beginning of the Meshushim River ravine. The site's Arabic name is Khirbet Deir Rahib.

== Archeology ==
The site was first explored in the 1880s by researcher Gottlieb Schumacher, who described Deir er-Rahib as "a small ruined village, with important ancient remains south of Nu'aran." According to Meir Dafna and Meir Eran, Schumacher suggested that the site contained the remains of an ancient synagogue.

Excavations in the late 1970s revealed the remains of a synagogue that was built in the 5th century based on coins found at the site, and there is evidence of a series of repairs made at the site, which was abandoned in the 7th century CE. It was located at the north-western end of the settlement. The synagogue measured 10 by 11 m (33 by 36 ft) and had benches, columns and decorated capitals and some of them with a nine-branched Menorah; although images of seven-branched Menorahs appear at the site, mirroring what existed in the Temple in Jerusalem. An "impression of the Ark" was found in plaster located n the south side of the building facing Jerusalem.

Beside the synagogue, two oil press were discovered, one of which was used from the 4th century to the 6th century. Remains of additional synagogues from the same period were also discovered 1.5 km (0.93 mi) to south east in the ruins of Sokho also known as Ahmadiyya, and in the Debia ruins, approximately 3 km (1.9 mi) east of the site.

== Gallery ==
Map of Israel in Hebrew

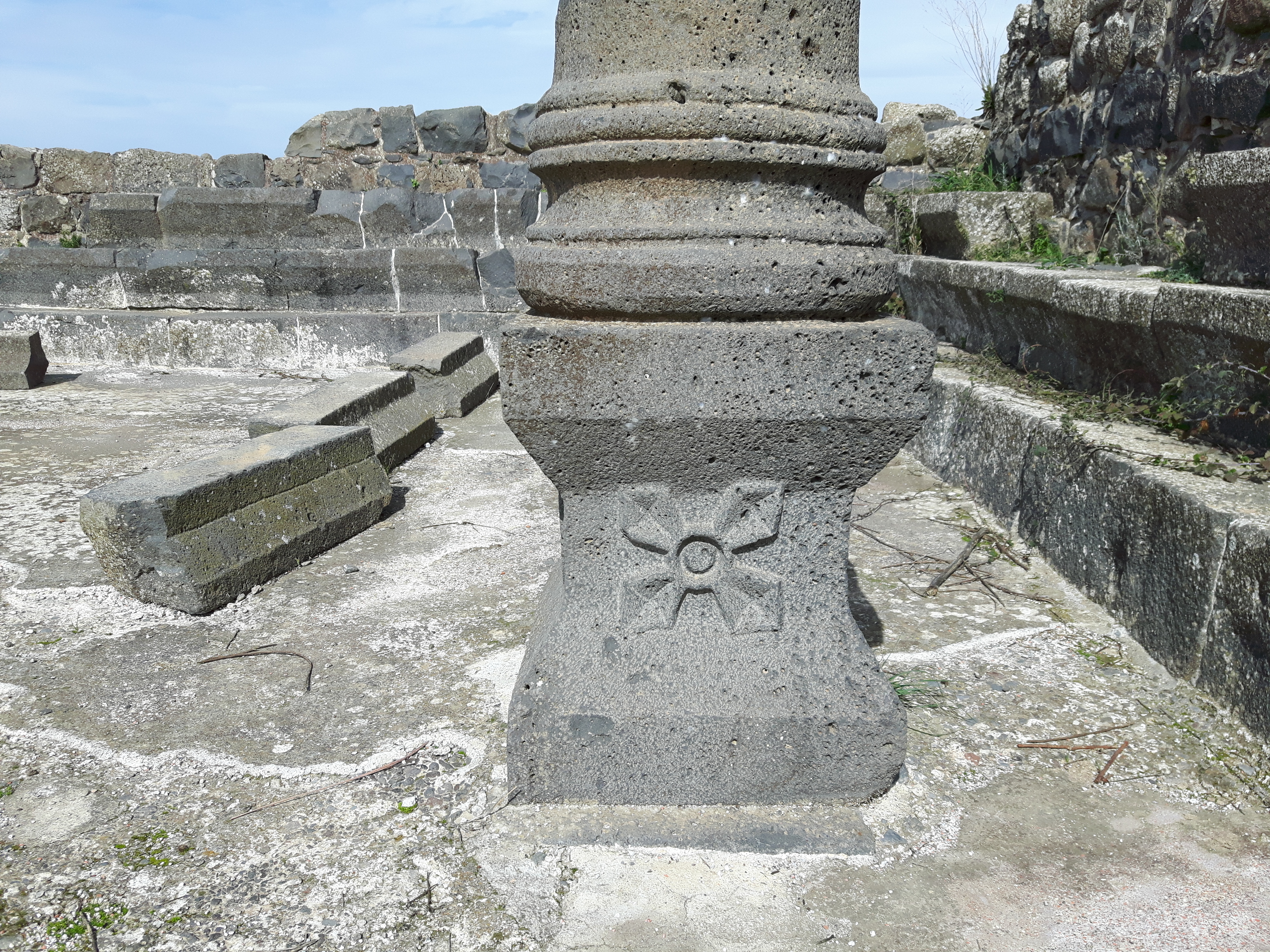
Decorated column capital

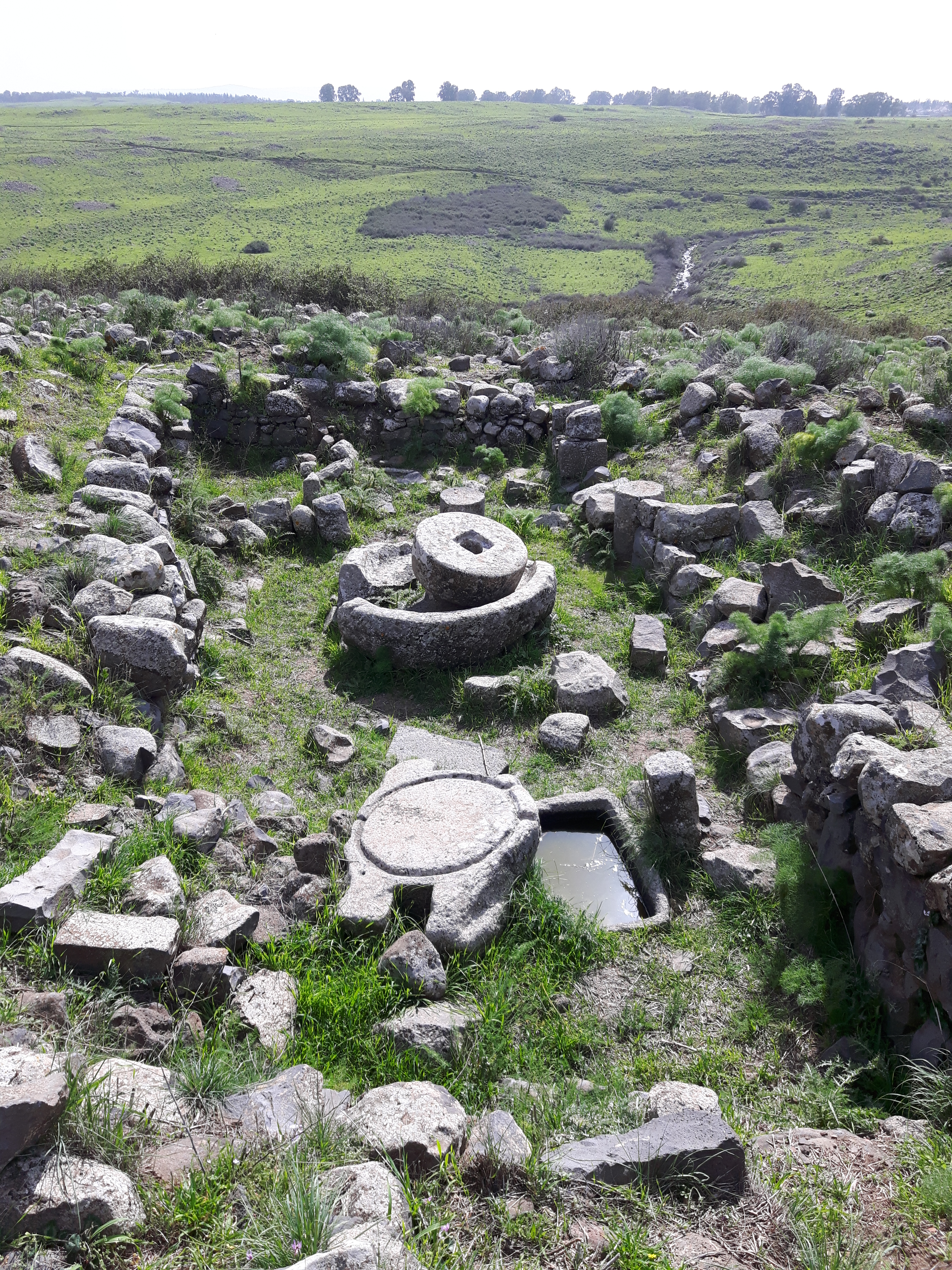
Remains of the oil press

== See also ==
- Archaeology of Israel
- History of the Jews in Syria
- List of synagogues in Syria
