= Qision =

Ancient Jewish settlement in Upper Galilee

- חורבת קציון (Hebrew)
- Horvat Qazyon (Heb.); Khirbet Qasyun (Ar.)
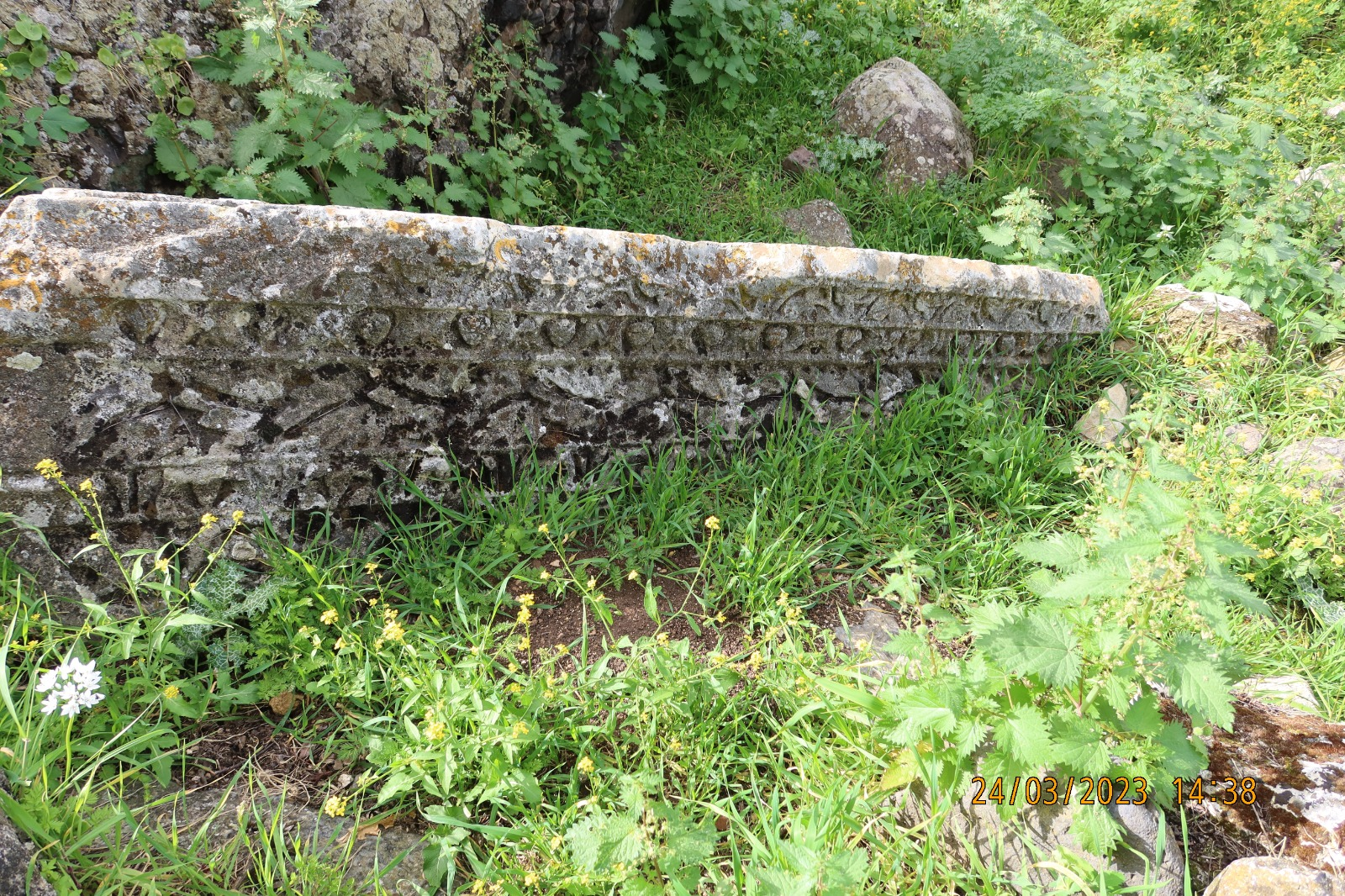
- A decorated lintel in Qision

- Location within Israel
- 33°02′34″N 35°31′46″E
- Type: Settlement, cultic structure (synagogue?)
- Periods: Roman period (second to third century CE)
- Associated with: Jews
- Location: Sde Eliezer, Northern District, Israel
- Region: Upper Galilee
- Palestine grid: 199/272

Site notes
- Condition: In ruins
- Public access: Yes

Qision (Hebrew: קַצִיּוֹן, also spelled Qazion and Qatsion) was an ancient settlement in Upper Galilee, now an archaeological site in northern Israel, featuring the ruins of the settlement, including a public building, possibly an ancient synagogue, alongside an inscription dedicated to the Roman emperor Septimius Severus and his family commissioned by the local Jewish community.

The site is known as Ḥorvat Qazyon (Hebrew: חורבת קציון), and in Arabic as Khirbet Qasyun or Khirbet Keisun.

== Location ==
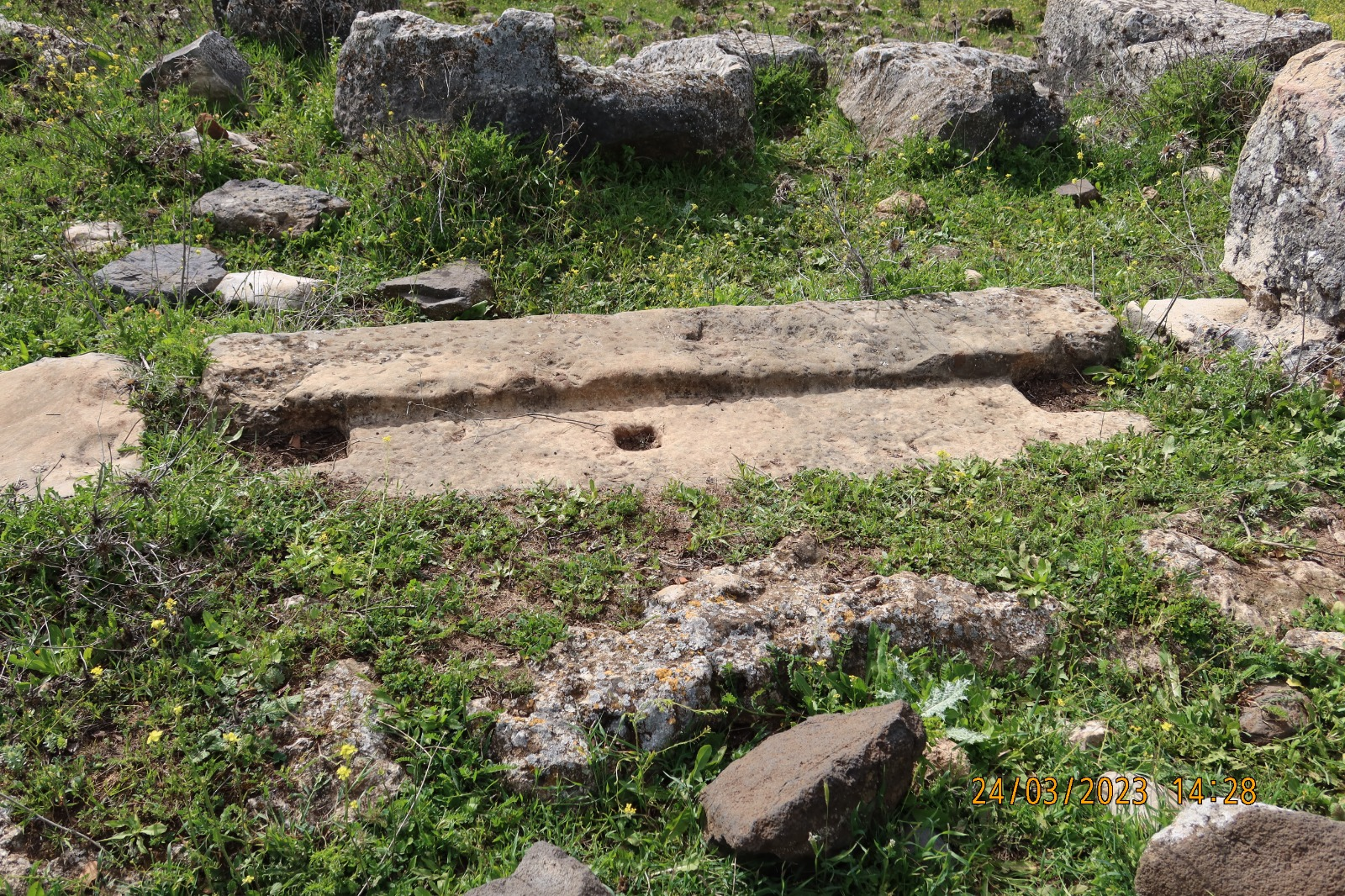
A threshold at Qision

The site is located in the Upper Galilee, approximately 9 km northeast of Safed and 1 km north of Meroth, a Jewish village dating from the Late Roman and Byzantine periods. The hill is covered with large Pistacia atlantica trees.

The ruin and the Qision brook are situated within the Dishon Stream area, constituting a fire zone. As such, access to the site necessitates prior coordination with military authorities.

== History ==
Twice mentioned in rabbinic literature, particularly in the Jerusalem Talmud, Qision appears in the name of Rabbi Yohanan from Kasion (Hebrew: רִבִּי יוֹחָנָן דְּקַצִיּוֹן), elsewhere as Karṣion (Hebrew: רִבִּי יוֹחָנָן דְּקַרְצִיוֹן), a sage from the third century. These passages strongly suggest the presence of a Jewish community at the site during the second and third centuries CE. This is further supported by surveys conducted on the site, which revealed a primary period of occupation during the same period.

Archaeologist Zvi Ilan proposed that the name Qision is derived from the Hebrew word קצה, meaning "edge," reflecting its position as one of the northernmost points of Jewish settlement in Galilee.

During the reign of the Roman Severan dynasty, Qision was part of the province of Syria Phoenice. The site experienced another period of occupation during the Mamluk era, particularly the 13th and 14th centuries, when it was possibly occupied by a Muslim group.

In a tradition originating from Safed in the 16th century, Qision is believed to house the tombs of Rabbi Yohanan from Kasion and Rabbi Shimon Ben Lakish.

Qision's ruins were first discovered in 1860 by Ernest Renan. The Arabic term Khirbet Keisun, recorded in the PEF Survey of Palestine, preserves the ancient name.

== Archaeology ==
=== Monumental structure and complex ===
The discovery of a distinctive complex of structures in Qision, comprising a sizable monumental building and a western structure, unparalleled elsewhere, alongside an inscription honoring the Roman emperor (see below), has sparked significant scholarly debate about its intended function. Opinions are split between two interpretations: Jewish synagogue or a Syro-Phoenician Roman temple.

Ernest Renan, who discovered the site in 1860, and Victor Guérin, who referenced it in his 1880 book, both identified the structure as a synagogue. However, PEF explorers Conder and Kitchener, following their visit in 1877, proposed identifying it with a Roman temple, dating back to the same period as the Temple at Kedesh.

In the 20th century, E.W.G. Masterman, in his 1909 writing, identified the site as a synagogue. Conversely, in a 1916 study, E. Kohl and C. Watzinger classified it as a temple, drawing parallels to Kedesh and other Roman temples in the region. In 1987, following a survey, A. Bar Oz and Zvi Ilan concluded that it was a public building with pagan characteristics.

In an effort to resolve this dispute, Rachel Hachlili and Ann E. Killebrew undertook three survey seasons at the site in 1992 and 1997. Despite their consensus that it was not a synagogue, they arrived at differing conclusions.

Killebrew proposed that the structure might have functioned as part of a cultic complex for ceremonies or festivals, constructed by local Jews to honor the imperial family of Septimius Severus.

Hachlili interpreted the site as a complex that served as a communal and religious center for priestly families relocating to Galilee after the Jewish–Roman wars, along with the local Jewish communities, serving as a space for the performance and preservation of priestly rituals. According to her analysis, the architectural features and the presence of ritual purification pools and an incense altar suggest its role in maintaining Jewish religious practices following the destruction of the Temple. This includes facilitating rituals like incense burning and the Water Libation Ceremony observed in the Temple during Sukkot.

Next to the northern wall of the monumental structure is a decorated, broken lintel adorned with grapevine branches bearing clusters of grapes, alongside Acanthus syriacus leaves.

=== Inscription dedicated to the family of Septimius Severus ===
A Greek-language inscription was found in Qision, dating to 195/6 CE. Discovered near an ancient building in 1860 by Ernest Renan, it was rediscovered in 1984. This inscription, originally part of a lintel, is dedicated to the salvation of Septimius Severus and his family.

The inscription is missing a section from the right corner. On the left side, a wreath with stylized leaves ending in a ribbon bound in a 'Hercules' knot features the name of Julia Domna. A similar wreath on the right side is missing.

The inscription was dedicated by the local Jewish community, as indicated in its text "in accord with the vow of the Jews" ([ἐξ] | εὐχῆς Ἰουδαίων). The Jewish villagers of Qision sought to display their loyalty to the imperial family, mirroring the practices of other communities in the province of Syria.

Similar inscriptions have been uncovered in Pannonia and Ostia, while a midrash refers to a synagogue known as "of Severus" in Rome. Scholars interpret the existence of such inscriptions, which uncommonly praise rulers in ancient Jewish contexts, as indicative of the special honor bestowed upon the Severan dynasty by Jewish communities.

Similar inscriptions have been discovered in Pannonia and Ostia, while one midrash references a synagogue known as "of Severus" in Rome. According to one interpretation, this unusual occurrence of mentioning rulers, especially with praise, in ancient Jewish inscriptions suggests that the Jews held the Severan dynasty in special esteem.

=== Olive oil press and burial caves ===
To the west of the public structure lie the remnants of an olive oil press, suggesting that the local inhabitants derived their livelihood from cultivating olive trees and producing olive oil. Several burial caves are situated on the southern slope of the ruin.

== See also ==
- Alma – a nearby site with the remnants of an ancient synagogue along with Jewish inscriptions
- Kalybe (temple) for cult of the emperor
- Roman imperial cult
