= Ancient Jewish art =

Art of the Jewish people during antiquity

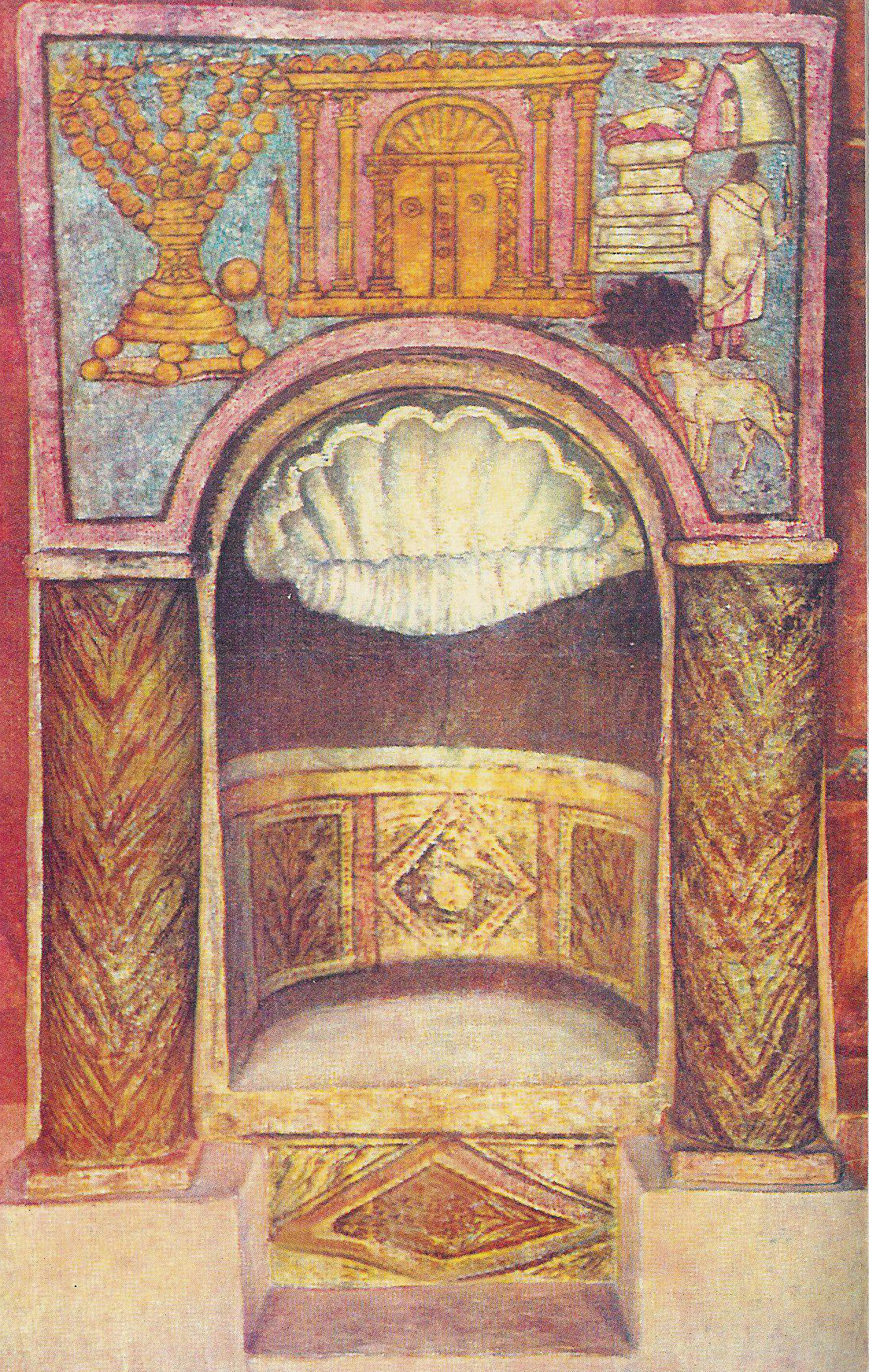
Ciborium of the Holy Ark of the synagogue of Doura Europos

Ancient Jewish art, is art created by Jews in both the Land of Israel and in the Diaspora prior to the Middle Ages. It features symbolic or figurative motifs often influenced by biblical themes, religious symbols, and the dominant cultures of the time, including Egyptian, Hellenistic, and Roman art.

During the Second Temple Period, Jewish decorative art followed the biblical prohibition against images, avoiding figurative or symbolic depictions. Motifs from Eastern Mediterranean art were used, but without human or animal figures, reflecting Torah injunctions and a resistance to Roman influence.

In Late Antiquity, the biblical commandment avoidance of figurative or symbolic painting was gradually ignored in part due to the influence of Christianity. Symbols such as the Menorah served as both artistic as well as national symbols of Jewish identity, growing more acute after the destruction of the Temple in Jerusalem.

== Outline ==
Prior to the First Temple Period and throughout its duration, literary sources point to the existence of craftsmanship which could be considered both art in its restrictive sense and natively Jewish. This was largely related to the decoration of the Tabernacle and the Temple that replaced it. Within this context a number of objects of figurative character were formed, such as the cherubs of the Ark of the Covenant and of the Solomonic Holy of Holies, and the Molten Sea which sat on the backs of twelve bronze oxen. Considering their ritual context, these were exceptions to the general prohibition against the creation of graven images. On the other hand, artifacts bearing plastic depictions, such as the plaques unearthed in King Ahab's "House of Ivory" in Samaria and Israelite seals found in many locations in the land of Israel, appear to be influenced by Phoenician, Assyrian or Egyptian styles and cannot be considered organic products of the Jewish culture.

In the Second Temple period, especially from the Hasmonean period and onward, Jewish art, both in the Land of Israel and the diaspora, was characterized by a marked avoidance of figurative or symbolic motifs. This was in accordance with the aforementioned Biblical prohibition, though the strict adherence to it was most probably a reaction to the efforts of Hellenistic and Roman rulers to impose idolatry on the Jewish people, thereby threatening their religion and culture. As a result the predominant artistic themes were geometric, floral, and architectural. On the other hand, Jewish Hellenistic factions of The Second Temple Period adopted Greek influences to some extent and integrated figurative depictions into their architecture and statuary, as can be seen in such sites as the Tobiad estate in Iraq al-Amir.

A significant shift occurred in Jewish artistic expression during Late Antiquity, when Jews began incorporating symbolic motifs in their synagogal and funerary art. This change was not only evident in the variety of contexts and localities but also in the diverse range of objects that featured these symbols. The repertoire of symbols, initially limited, expanded over time.

This change in artistic expression was influenced by the rise of Christianity and its establishment as the official religion of the Roman Empire. The new religious landscape presented a challenge to Judaism, necessitating a shift in cultural representation. The Jews began to use specific symbols in their art as a means of expressing and affirming their Jewish identity. These symbols included the menorah, the showbread table, the ark, ritual objects, and the conch. Originally part of the Temple rites, these symbols held significant meaning and became a prominent feature in Jewish art of the period. They served not only as religious symbols but also as emblems of national and communal identity.

The menorah's evolution is understood as a key example of this transition. Initially a sign of priestly roles during the Second Temple period, the menorah transformed into a widely recognized symbol of Jewish identity after the Temple's destruction.

== Motifs ==
=== Menorah ===
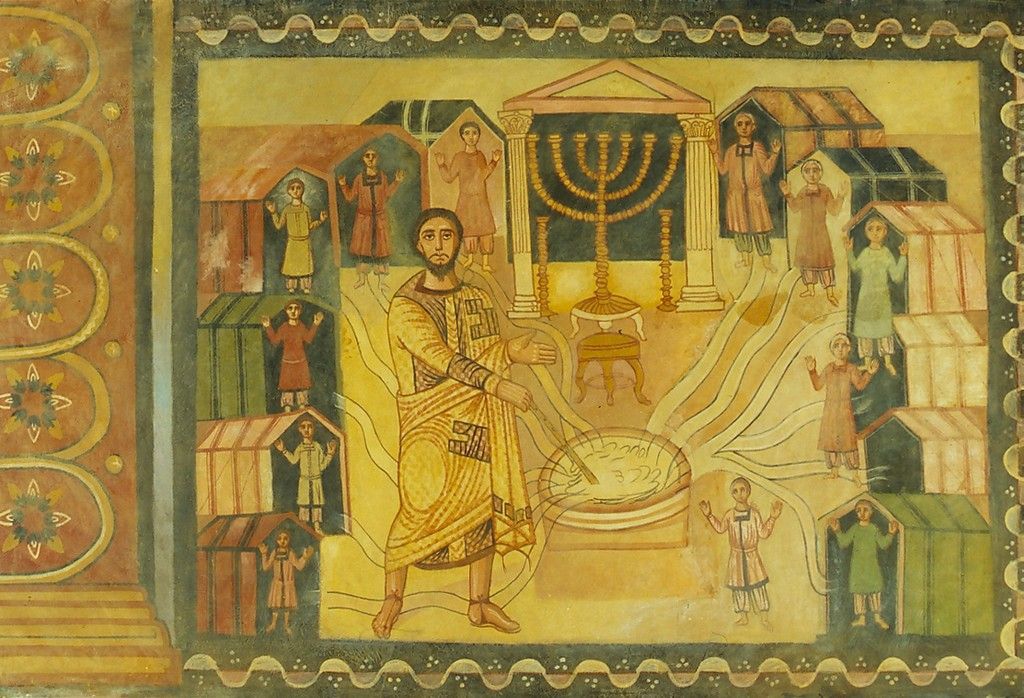
Dura-Europos archival photograph showing menorah

The menorah, originally described in the Bible as being a solid gold candelabrum with a central shaft and six branches extending from it, is mentioned first in the context of the Tabernacle, and was later used in the Temple of Jerusalem as part of the daily ritual. Even as the Second Temple stood, the image of the menorah was used in a decorative context.

As a concrete figurative symbol, the menorah first appeared during the second half of the first century BCE. Depictions increased gradually over time, gaining particular prominence in the ornamentation of synagogues, places of residence, catacombs and ritual objects during the third and fourth centuries CE, both in Israel and in the diaspora.

The first visual representations of the menorah appear on the coins of the last Hasmonean king Mattathias Antigonus (40–37 BCE). Additional depictions from the Second Temple Period include those on several plaster fragments from the Jewish Quarter of Jerusalem and a sundial found near the Tempe Mount, five incised menorahs on the eastern wall of Jason’s tomb in Jerusalem, two painted menorahs on the wall of a cistern in a refuge cave of Nahal Mikhmas, two ossuaries from Jerusalem, one ossuary from the Goliath family tomb at Jericho, and the famous depiction on the arch of Titus. The “Darom” clay oil lamps from Judea have depictions of the menorah as well, though they are dated to the period between the destruction of the Temple (70 CE) and the Bar Kokhba revolt (135 CE).

Remains of several free-standing Menorahs have been unearthed in the excavations of several ancient synagogues in Hammat Tiberias, Horvat Qoshet, Sussiya, Ma’on, Eshtemoa, Meroth, Ein Gedi and the diasporan synagogue of Sardis. Save the Menorah from Ein Gedi which was made of bronze, the rest were largely made of stone, though it is possible that others originally made of metal were plundered, and those made of wood did not survive due to decay.

The most famous of menorah representations from late antiquity appear on synagogue mosaics, such as have been found in Hammat Tiberias, Bet Alpha, Sussiya, Na’aran, Huseifa, Bet Shean, Sepphoris, Ma’on, Hulda, Jericho, Gerasa and Ein Gedi, though their numbers on both public and domestic architectural elements such as lintels, chancel screens, capitals, columns, and others, ranging from the 2nd century and onwards, are much greater. These have been unearthed in locations such as Ashdod, Ashkelon, Capernaum, Ein Nashut, Eshtemoa, Fiq, Gaza, Hebron, Jericho, Jerusalem, Naveh, Qasrin, Sussiya, Tiberias, and many others.

Not only in Israel, but in the diaspora as well, the menorah was a prominent symbol in synagogues and was often found in various artistic forms. Menorahs of different styles appear on the wall paintings at the Dura Europos synagogue, while mosaics with menorahs were discovered in diaspora locations such as Apaemea, Bova Marina, Hamam-Lif, and Philippopolis. Reliefs, engravings and incisions featuring menorahs were found at Ostia, Priene, Sardis and Stobi, and images of menorahs were also found on architectural and stone fragments at Acmonia, Aphordisias, Athens, Bithynion-Caludiopolis, Corinth, Nicaea, Pergamon, Porto (Italy) and Tarragona. The practical use of the menorah in the diaspora synagogal context is implied by the inscriptions from the synagogues of Side in Pamphylia and Sardis, in which donation of menorahs to these synagogues is mentioned.

Various theories for the meaning of the menorah depictions have been proposed, some of which suggest that it was a symbol of the heavenly spheres with God as the source of their light. Others present it as a sign of yearning for the Temple and of the hopes for its renewal, or a counter-substitute for the Christian cross. According to Hachlili, the most probable of existing theories is one which proposes that the seven branches signified the seven days of the week, while the Menorah itself served as a daily ritual calendar with an additional candle being lit every day. Levine suggests that it is possible that the menorah's very ability to take on varied interpretations contributed to its popularity.

=== Showbread Table ===
See main article: Showbread

Like the Menorah, the Showbread table was also a central vessel in the biblical tabernacle and the Temple of Jerusalem, though after the destruction its depiction was much less prominent.

The Massoretic version of the biblical text describes a table made of acacia wood and coated with gold, while the Septuagint has τράπεζαν χρυσίου καθαροῦ, a table made of pure gold. The shape of the Showbread table as implied by the biblical description was of rectangular form, though Josephus describes it as similar to the Mensae Delphicae, a three-legged round table which was popular during the Second Temple Period. Visual depictions from the Second Temple Period, such as the aforementioned coins of Mattathias Antigonus, the plaster fragments from the Jewish Quarter and the Arch of Titus, align with the biblical rectangular description, while the few depictions on the mosaics of late antique synagogues largely correspond to that of Josephus. These have been found in the synagogues of Dura Europos, Sepphoris and the Samaritan synagogue of El-Hirbeh, though the simple portrayal on the lintel of the synagogue in Qasrin is of the rectangular style. According to Hachlili the recurring style of the round table in the synagogues of Dura Europus, Sepphoris and El-Hirbeh points to a common source, possibly a Jewish pattern book.

=== Ritual Objects ===
Alongside the Menorah, in many Jewish artistic compositions of late antiquity there appear several articles of ritual significance. In Israel the most common of these are the Lulav, Ethrog, Shofar and an incense shovel, while in the diaspora the incense shovel was replaced by an amphora, vase or flask and a depiction of a Torah scroll was added.

The meaning of these representations is debated. One approach maintains that they symbolize memory and yearning for the Temple of Jerusalem, in which these articles had ritual significance, another suggests that they consist of objects which were used in the synagogue setting. A third interpretation posits that they represent the three High Holidays which occur during the Jewish month of Tishrei, relating the Shofar to Rosh Hashana, the incense shovel to Yom Kippur, and the Lulav and Etrog to Sukkoth. If the vase or flask represents the water libation, it too can be attributed to the festival of Sukkoth, during which a water libation was poured on the altar. The final approach sees these symbols as a combination of representative objects of both the Temple and the synagogue, pointing to the continuity of worship from one to the other.

=== The Temple and the Ark of the Scrolls ===
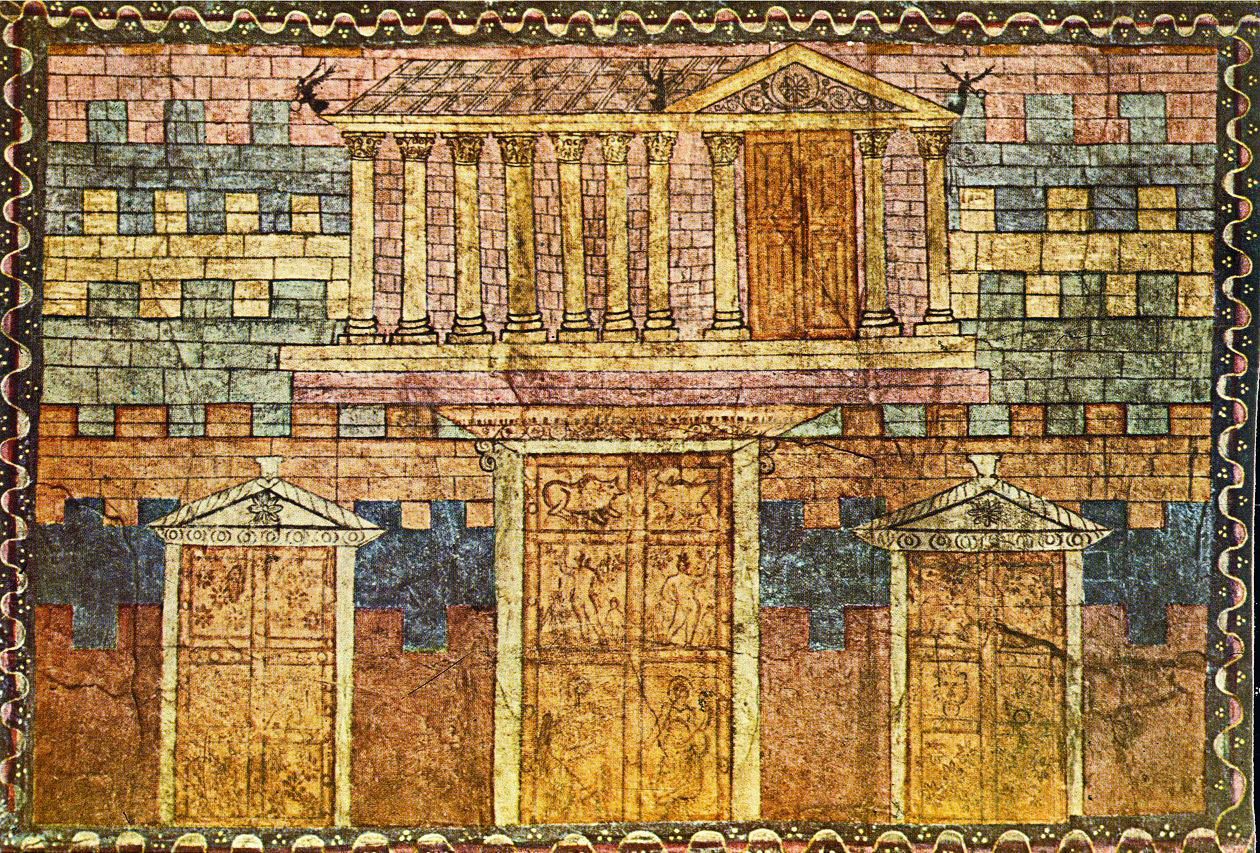
245–246 CE Dura-Europos mural depicting Solomon's Temple

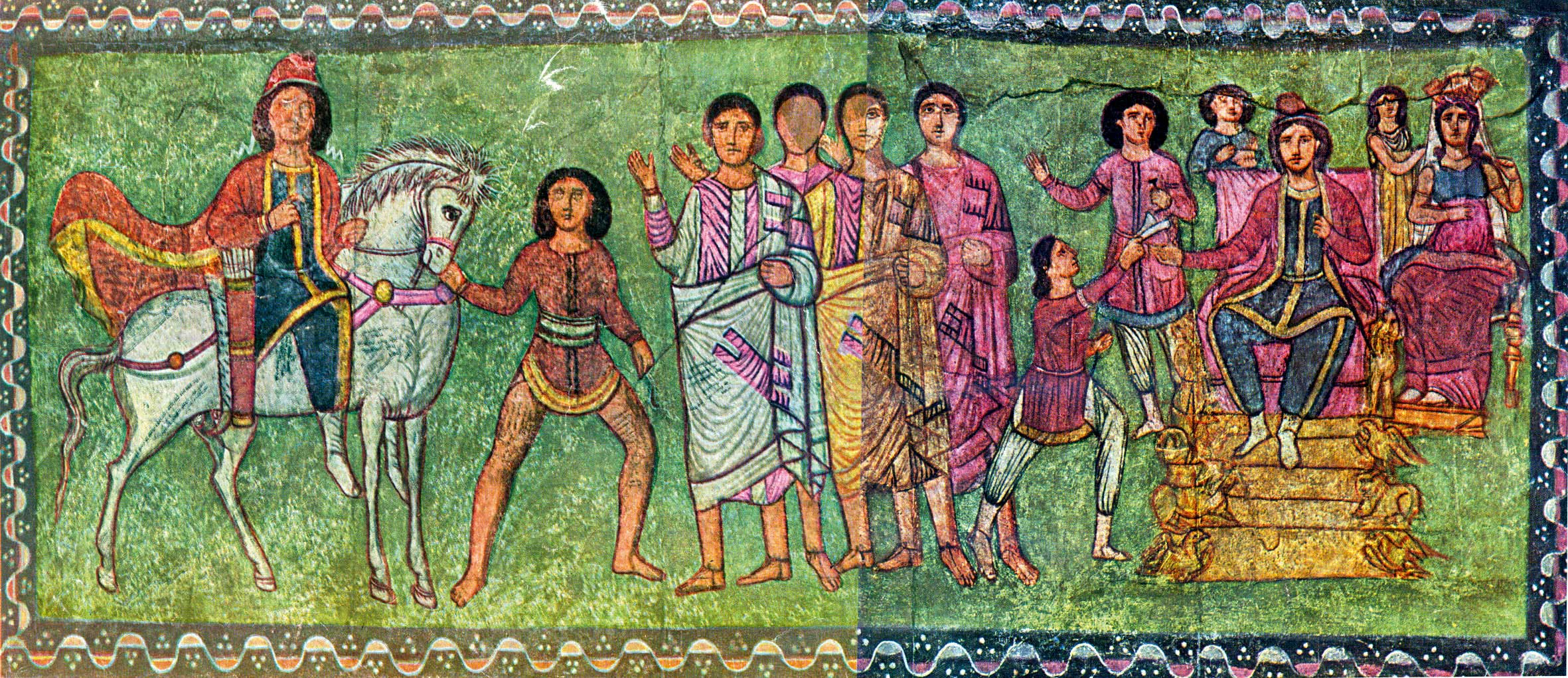
Mordecai and Esther

In the Jewish artistic representations of late antiquity, only two representations of the Temple have been discovered. One depiction on the shrine of the Dura Europus synagogue in modern day Syria, and one probable illustration on a gold glass from the Jewish catacombs of Rome.

The depiction from Dura Europus bears similarities to the Temple facade on the Bar Kokhba coins, consisting of a tetrastyle sanctuary with two pairs of fluted columns and Egyptian style capitals, a portal flanked by two decorated pillars, surmounted by a conch, and a double door with an ornamented center and two knobs.

The depiction on the gold glass is not as distinct. It consists of a gabled shrine within a columned courtyard. Steps lead up to the entrance to the shrine, on top of which is a Menorah within a tympanum, and on either side of which are two columns. Below the shrine is a second Menorah flanked by ritual objects. Hachlili concludes that the representation on the gold glass, despite its Graeco-Roman style and its difference from the other representations, most probably depicts the Temple as well. Her conclusion is drawn from the composition of the images, placing the structure within a columned courtyard next to a Menorah, and from its relative similarity to the other representations of sanctuaries in the Dura Europus synagogue, among them the Temple representation mentioned above. It has been suggested that the Temple imagery represents Jewish hope for the restoration of the Temple and the coming of the Messiah.

Another structural depiction, common in Jewish art of late antiquity is the Ark of the Scrolls, a chest which stood in the Torah shrine of the synagogue, and in which Torah scrolls and scriptures were stored. Generally made of wood, only traces of the original arks have survived, though much is known about them through their common depictions in artistic renditions. In the majority of these representations the ark stands on two to four legs, is surmounted by a gable or a round top, has a double door with geometric ornamentation and is often flanked by two Menorahs. All the representations of the ark of the scrolls in Israel are depicted with their doors shut, except for the drawing in Bet She’arim which shows open doors behind which are shelves bearing scrolls, a feature it shares with all such depictions in the diaspora.

It is most probable that the Torah shrine with its gabled roof and columns, and containing the ark of the scrolls, was meant to resemble the facade of the Jerusalem Temple, though a direct association is difficult to prove.

As for its meaning, artistic representations of the ark confirm that its role in the synagogue was not only practical, but symbolic as well, with it signifying the centrality of scripture and its study within the context of Temple worship, and its spiritual association with the community of the synagogue itself.

== See also ==
- Zodiac mosaics in ancient synagogues
