= Hama (disambiguation) =

Hama is a city in west-central Syria, previously known as Hamath.

Hama or Hamath (or variants) may refer to:

== Places ==
In the MENA region (Middle East and North Africa), the name with its many variations (Hamma(h), Ham(m)at, etc.) is usually indicative for the presence of hot springs, as it stands for hot water in Semitic languages.

=== Middle East ===
In alphabetical order, by complete name.

- Al-Hamah, a village in Rif Dimashq Governorate, Syria
- Al-Hamma, Tiberias, a depopulated Palestinian Arab village
  - Hamat Gader, hot springs and archaeological site at the site of Al-Hamma
- Emmaus, town mentioned in the New Testament; name derived from Hamma or Hammat
- Hamat, a village in Lebanon
- Hamat Tiberias, archaeological site at ancient town, Israel
- Hamath-zobah, ancient place or kingdom in Aram
- Mevo Hama, Israeli settlement in the Golan Heights
- Tell el-Hammeh, tell on the West Bank
- Tell Hammeh, tell in Jordan

=== North Africa ===
- El Hamma, town in Tunisia
- El Hamma, Khenchela, town in Algeria
  - El Hamma District, Algeria
- Hamma, Algeria - town and commune

=== Other places ===
- Abbotsham, English village, recorded in the Domesday Book as Hama

== People ==
- Hama (queen) (died between c. 783 and c. 773 BCE), Assyrian queen
- Hama (Yuan dynasty) (died 1356), government official
- Hama bar Bisa (3rd century), Talmud rabbi
- Hama bar Hanina (3rd century), Talmud rabbi
- Hama bar Ukva (fl. 290–320), Talmud rabbi
- Chisaki Hama (born 1988), a Japanese model, actress, and singer
- Fumie Hama (born 1939), Japanese speed skater
- Larry Hama (born 1949), an American writer, artist, actor and musician
- Taiyo Hama (濱 大耀; born 1998), Japanese footballer
- Takumi Hama (濱 託巳; born 1996), Japanese footballer

== Fictional characters ==
- Háma, a warrior in Germanic heroic poetry and legends
- Hama, a character in Avatar: The Last Airbender (season 3) episode 48
- Hama, a character in Kousoku Sentai Turboranger
- Háma, Captain of King Théoden's Guard in J.R.R. Tolkien's novel The Two Towers.

== Science and technology ==
- Human anti-mouse antibody (HAMA)
- Apache Hama, a software project

== Other uses ==
- Hama (company), a German manufacturer
- Hama Yumi, a sacred bow used in 1103 CE in Japan
- Hindu Adoptions and Maintenance Act (1956) (HAMA)

== See also ==
- Battle of Hamath, or Battle of Hama
- Battle of Hama (disambiguation)
- Hama massacre (disambiguation)
- Hamas (disambiguation), a Palestinian Sunni-Islamist fundamentalist organization
