= Zodiac mosaics in ancient synagogues =

Aspect of ancient Jewish art

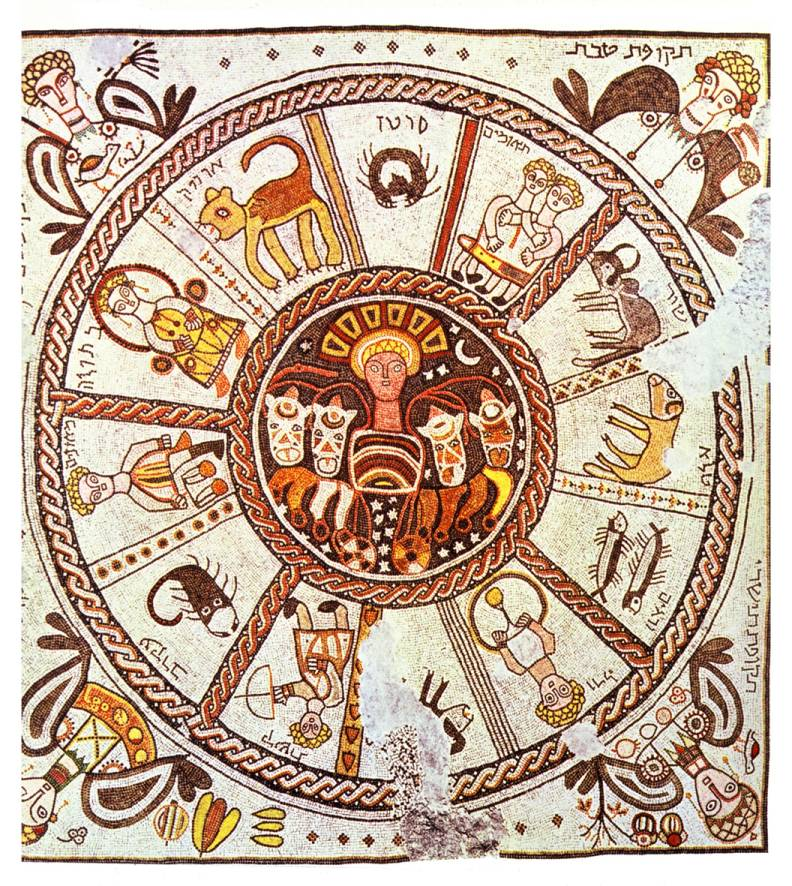
Helios-zodiac cycle, Beth Alpha Synagogue

At least eight synagogues from ancient Israel (Roman Palestine), in the 4th–6th centuries CE during the Byzantine period, contained zodiac mosaics. As a typical arrangement, the mosaic floors of such synagogues consisted of three panels, the central one containing the Jewish zodiac.

== Inventory ==
The examples cited by Hachlili in 1977 are the synagogues at Hammat Tiberias (4th century), Husaifa (5th century), Na'aran and Beth Alpha (6th century). The large synagogue of Sepphoris (5th–6th century), more recently discovered, has a different panel scheme; the one at Susiya probably had a zodiac mosaic in the 6th century, which was later replaced by a non-figurative pattern; at En Gedi there is an inscription with the names of the zodiac signs and the corresponding Jewish months, but no imagery; at Meroth archaeologists found three slabs containing zodiac signs; the Yafi'a synagogue, with a different layout and whose twelve medallions set between two circles are lost except for one plus a second depicting the zodiac. The 5th-century Huqoq synagogue's mosaic floor also contains a depiction of Helios, the zodiac signs and personifications of the four seasons, next to images unique to this site. The Huqoq design only resembles the one at Yafi'a, with Helios placed in a central medallion, which is surrounded by roundels interlaced with each other. The Wadi Hamam synagogue, not far from Huqoq, was very similar in its architectural plan and surviving mosaics, which makes researchers believe that it probably had its own prominent Helios-and-zodiac depiction, but the central part of the nave's mosaic floor is missing.

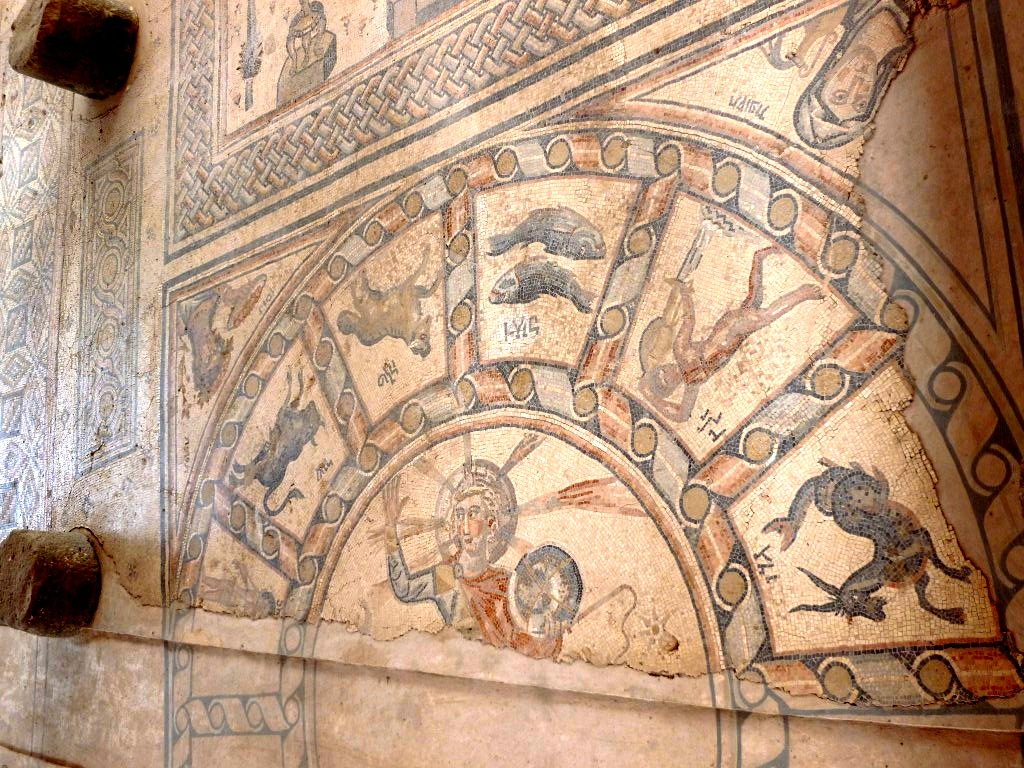
Helios and zodiac, Hammat Tiberias synagogue

== Analysis ==
=== Patterns, aesthetics ===
Some of the buildings' art was remarkably well-preserved, giving a window into the specifics of partially-lost traditions. The craftsmanship of these as well as of other unexpected historical Jewish art has been previously called "touchingly naive," "untutored," and even "primitive," but these dismissals are now outdated.

In 1993, the most elaborate mosaic yet was found in Sepphoris. It has some uniques: scenes of the accessories and sacrifices of the Temple and a scene of the angels visiting Abraham and Sarah. "Elegant indeed... we find Scorpio (עקרב) together with its Hebrew month Heshvan (חשון), Sagittarius (קשת) together with Kislev (כסלו)".

Hachlili says Jewish communities "always used the same scheme for their floors." There are four figures (seasons) on the outer corners. Within is a roundel with twelve depictions. In the bullseye is a sun god with the appropriate horses-chariots imagery.

The Beth Alpha example has been called one of Israel's great artistic treasures,

so filled with feeling and so packed with information for scholars to study. It revolutionized ideas about ancient Jewish attitudes toward representational art, which many previously believed had been nonexistent.

=== Religious symbolism ===
Lucille A. Roussin sees the sun deity depicted in the mosaics as continuation of an ancient faith in angels seen as entities interposed between the highest, seventh firmament understood as the seat of God, and the earthly realm. As to the zodiac, she quotes Josephus, who states not only that among the twelve stones of the high priest's breastplate "[s]un and moon are indicated by the two sardonyxes", but also that "whether one would prefer to read in them the months or the constellations of like number, which the Greeks call the circle of the zodiac, he will not mistake the lawgiver's intention." Note that the common rabbinic interpretation of the twelve stones is that they represent the twelve tribes of Israel.

Jodi Magness argues the sun god is Helios and to be identified with the angel Metatron.

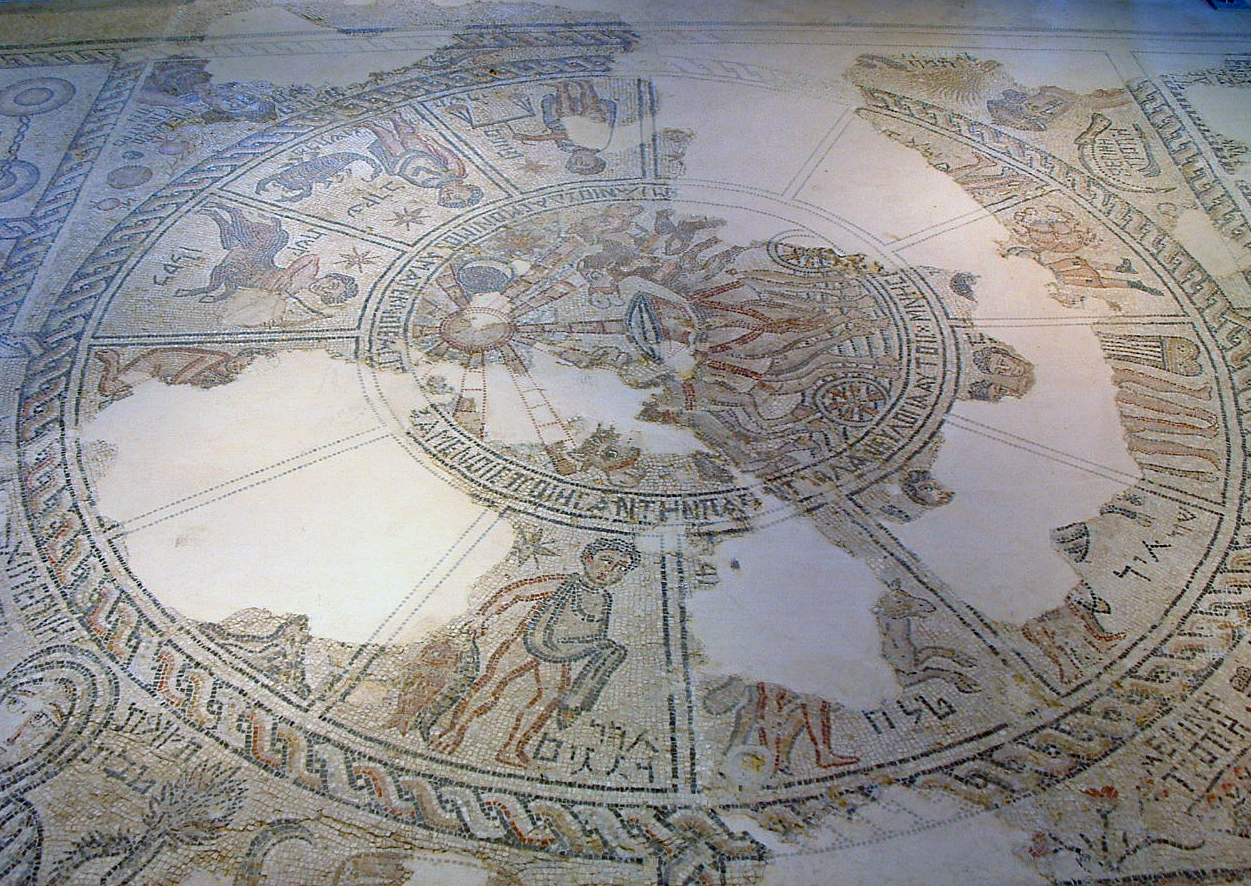
Helios and zodiac, Tzippori Synagogue

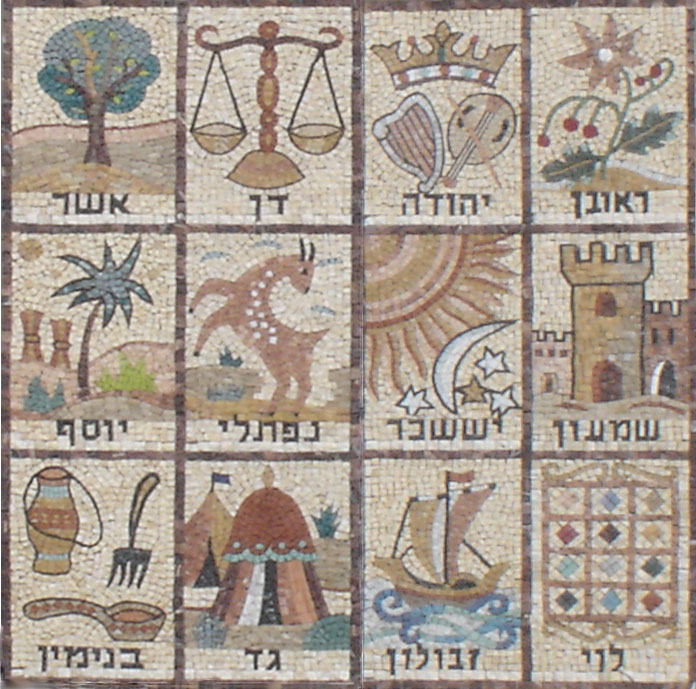
The Twelve Tribes of Israel, modern synagogue mosaic

== Similar examples ==
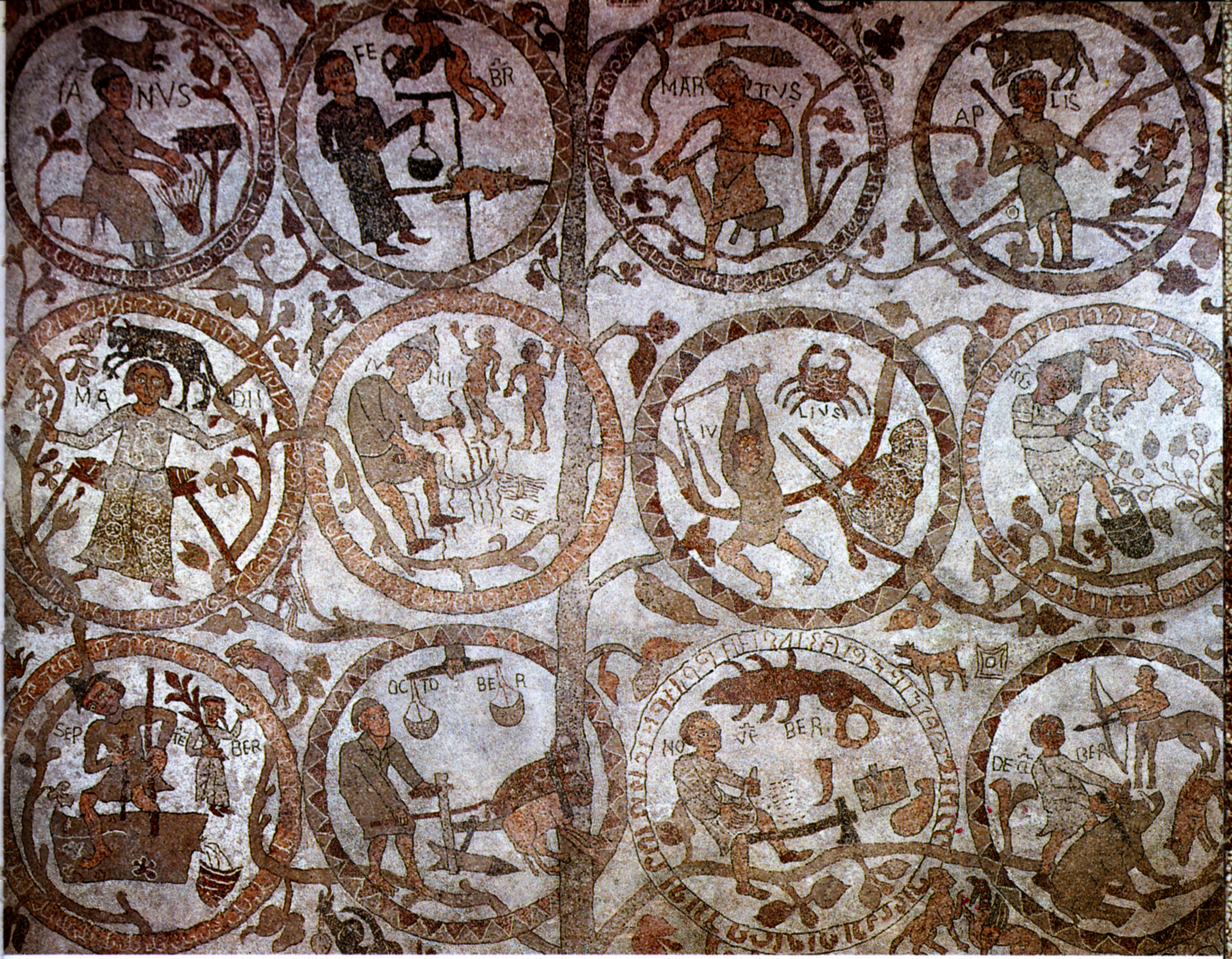
Examples appear in Christendom: here, Otranto cathedral

=== Greece ===
The combination of zodiac signs grouped around Helios and with personifications of the four seasons in the corners is typical for ancient synagogues from Eretz Israel. However, Ruth Jacoby signalled in 2001 the only known exception, from the Tallaras Baths in Astypalaea, Greece. There, the scheme is completed by the personifications of the twelve solar months, which surround those of the lunar calendar (the zodiac signs). Additionally, two more similar examples from Greece are known, none of them synagogues, where the four seasons in the corners are however replaced by the four winds of heaven: one in Sparta (4th century), which also has the solar calendar (the twelve months), and one from Thessaloniki. Jacoby suggests that the depiction of the lunar and solar calendars, both in use at the time, must have been such common motifs that they reached even such a remote place as the island of Astypalaea.

=== Roman zodiac iconography ===
==== Zodiac and days of the week mosaic ====
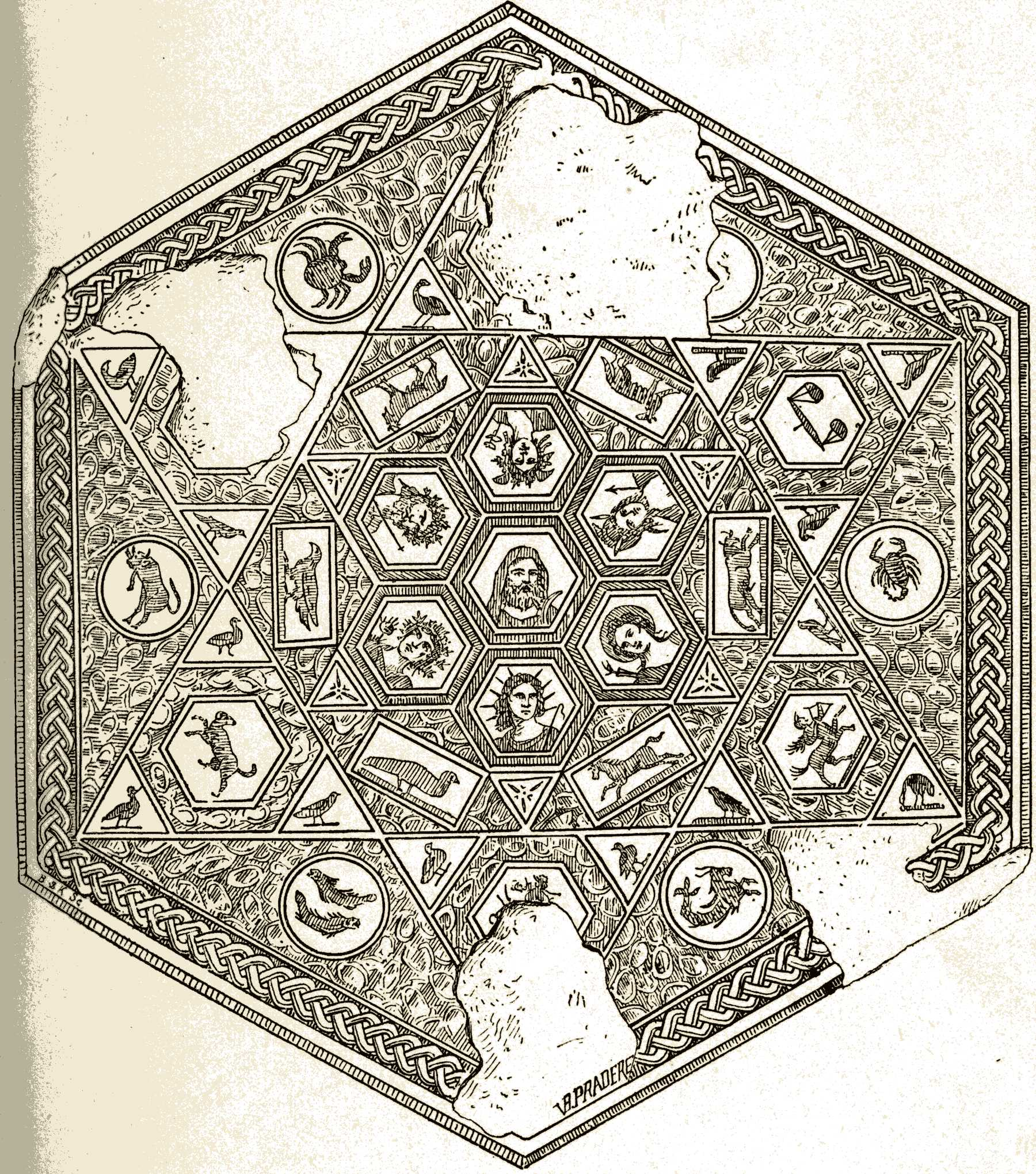
Pagan 3rd-century Roman zodiac mosaic floor with hexagonal pattern. Bardo National Museum (Tunis)

The mosaic reproduced here dates to the 3rd century, the Imperial Roman period. At the centre it has the representations of the seven Roman gods after whom the days of the week were named in Latin – in the centre Cronus or Saturn (Saturday), then clockwise from top Venus (Friday), Mars (Tuesday), Luna (Monday), Sol (Sunday), Mercury (Wednesday), and Iovis (Thursday) – surrounded by the zodiac signs – clockwise from the top: Aquarius is missing, Virgo is missing, Libra, Scorpio, Sagittarius, Capricorn, Aries is missing, Pisces, Leo, Taurus, Gemini is missing, and Cancer. The mosaic comes from Bir Chana in the Zaghouan region of Tunisia (part of the Roman province of Africa at the time) and is on display at the Bardo Museum in Tunis.

=== Mithraic imagery ===
Roman Mithraic depictions of Mithras slaying the bull can contain the images of Sol in his quadriga and the zodiac signs.

== See also ==
- Ancient synagogues in Palestine
- Ancient Jewish art
- Dendera temple complex, zodiac (Egypt)
- Gezer calendar
- Jewish views on astrology
- Historic synagogues
  - Dura-Europos synagogue
- Mazzaroth, biblical term for constellations or zodiac
- Naaran

== Bibliography ==
- An overview mentioning all four. Hachlili, Rachel (1977). "The Zodiac in Ancient Jewish Art: Representation and Significance". Bulletin of the American Schools of Oriental Research (228). American Schools of Oriental Research: 61–77. doi:10.2307/1356500. ISSN 0003-097X. JSTOR 1356500.
- Magness, Jodi (2005). "Heaven on Earth: Helios and the Zodiac Cycle in Ancient Palestinian Synagogues". Dumbarton Oaks Papers. 59. Dumbarton Oaks, Trustees for Harvard University: 1–52. doi:10.2307/4128749. ISSN 0070-7546. JSTOR 4128749.
