= Khamas =

Khamas may refer to:

- Khamas, Khuzestan, a village in Iran
- Khamas (raga), a Carnatic music scale
- Hamas, a Palestinian political and military organization
- Amine Khammas (born 1999), Belgian-Moroccan footballer

== See also ==
- Hamas (disambiguation)
- Khamasi, a village in Iran
