= Tell el-Hammeh =

Archaeological site, West Bank

Coordinates: 32.3751003°N 35.5082064°E

Tell el-Hammeh is a medium-size archaeologica tell (archaeological mound) in the West Bank, at the southern fringe of the Beit She'an valley. It has been identified with the Canaanite city state of Hammath, mentioned in an early-13th century BCE Egyptian inscription, the First Beth-Shean Stela of Seti I.

== Etymology ==
A nearby hot water spring gave the site its name, as hammah is Arabic forn "hot spring", therefore Tell el-Hammeh means "tell of the hot spring".

== Geography ==
Tell el-Hammeh is a kidney-shaped, high and steep mound situated at the place where the small inner valley of Wadi el-Hammeh exits into the southernmost part of the Beit She'an valley. Two close-by springs allowed long-term settlement; a good fresh-water spring and a thermal one. The site is about 1.5 kilometres (0.93 mi) north-west of the moshav-type Israeli settlement of Mehola, and some 14 kilometres (8.7 mi) south of Beit She'an. The entire site has an area of 30 dunams (3ha); the tell rises by about 30 metres (98 ft) from the surrounding plain, and its top covers an area of 5 dunams (1.2 acres).

The tell rises on the east side and close to Road 90, which follows the Jordan Valley and connects Beit She'an with Jericho.

== Identification ==
William F. Albright was the first to identify Tell el-Hammeh with the Canaanite city state of Hammath, known from a stela of Seti I (r. 1290–1279 BCE) describing a military campaign during which the Egyptian pharaoh aided an alliance between Pahel (Pella) and Hammath in their fight against Beth-shal (Beth-shan) and Rehob. This identification is now widely accepted.

== Surveys and excavation ==
The tell was excavated in 1985-1988 by Jane Cahill, who reported of layers of the Iron Age, or 11th to 7th centuries BCE, separated by the remains of major fires. One layer, from the 9th century or later, revealed a stone building, while earlier ones only had mud-bricks. Unusual concentrations of loom weights and spindles from different periods suggest the city maintained a weaving industry.

Pottery finds from various surveys date to the Middle Bronze II, Late Bronze I-III, Iron I-II, Persian, Early and Late Roman, Byzantine and Early Muslim periods.

== Khirbet el-Hammeh ==
The large khirbeh (town ruin) extends west, south and north at the foot of the tell. It contains many remains of a town founded during the Byzantine period, apparently replacing the older one from the tell. A 1986 survey found shards from the Byzantine (30%), Early Muslim (40%) and medieval period (1099-1534; 40%).

== See also ==
- Hama (disambiguation)

== References and further reading ==
- Cahill Jane M., "The excavations at Tell el-Hammah: a prelude to Amihai Mazar's Beth-Shean Valley regional project". In Aren M. Maeir (ed.) I will speak the riddles of ancient times, volume II. Winona Lake: Eisenbrauns, 2006. Pages 429-459.
- Tell el-Hammeh site record, in the Digital Archaeological Atlas of the Holy Land.
