= Hamas Charter =

Hamas charter can refer to:

- 1988 Hamas charter, the founding charter of Hamas
- 2017 Hamas charter, revised charter of Hamas

== See also ==
- Hamas (disambiguation)
