= Tzippori Synagogue =

Former and ancient synagogue in Sepphoris, Israel

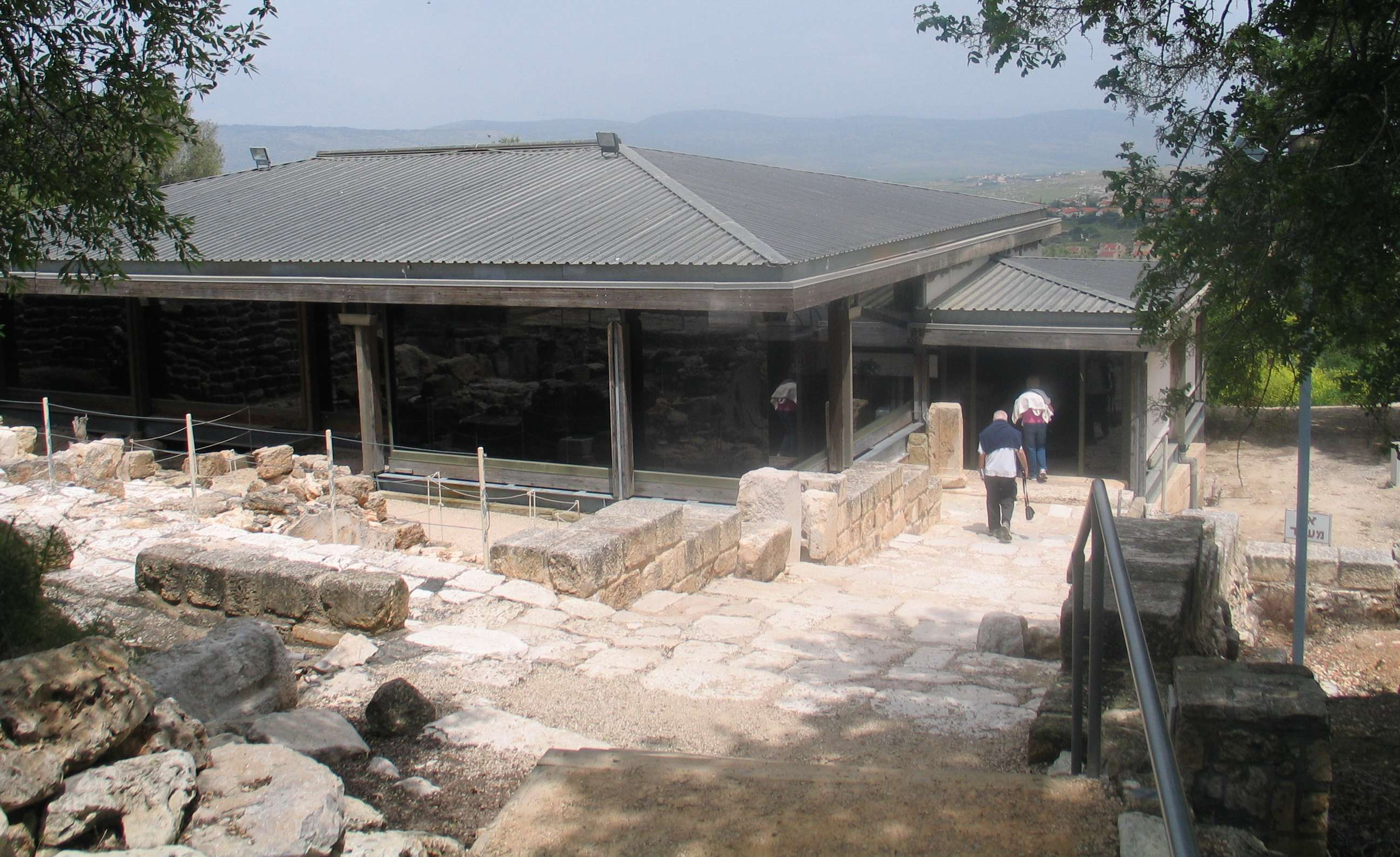
- The archeological site, in 2011

- Location of the former synagogue in northwestern Israel

Religion
- Affiliation: Judaism (former)
- Ecclesiastical or organizational status: Synagogue; Archaeological site
- Status: Abandoned

Location
- Location: Sepphoris, Galilee, Northern Israel
- Country: Israel
- Interactive map of Tzippori Synagogue
- Coordinates: 32°45′08″N 35°16′52″E

Architecture
- Completed: c. 5th century

Specifications
- Length: 20.7 m (68 ft)
- Width: 8 m (26 ft)

The Tzippori Synagogue, also known as the Sepphoris Synagogue, is a former ancient Jewish synagogue, now an archaeological site and a national park, that was discovered in Sepphoris, a Roman-era Jewish city in the Galilee, in northwestern Israel.

== History ==
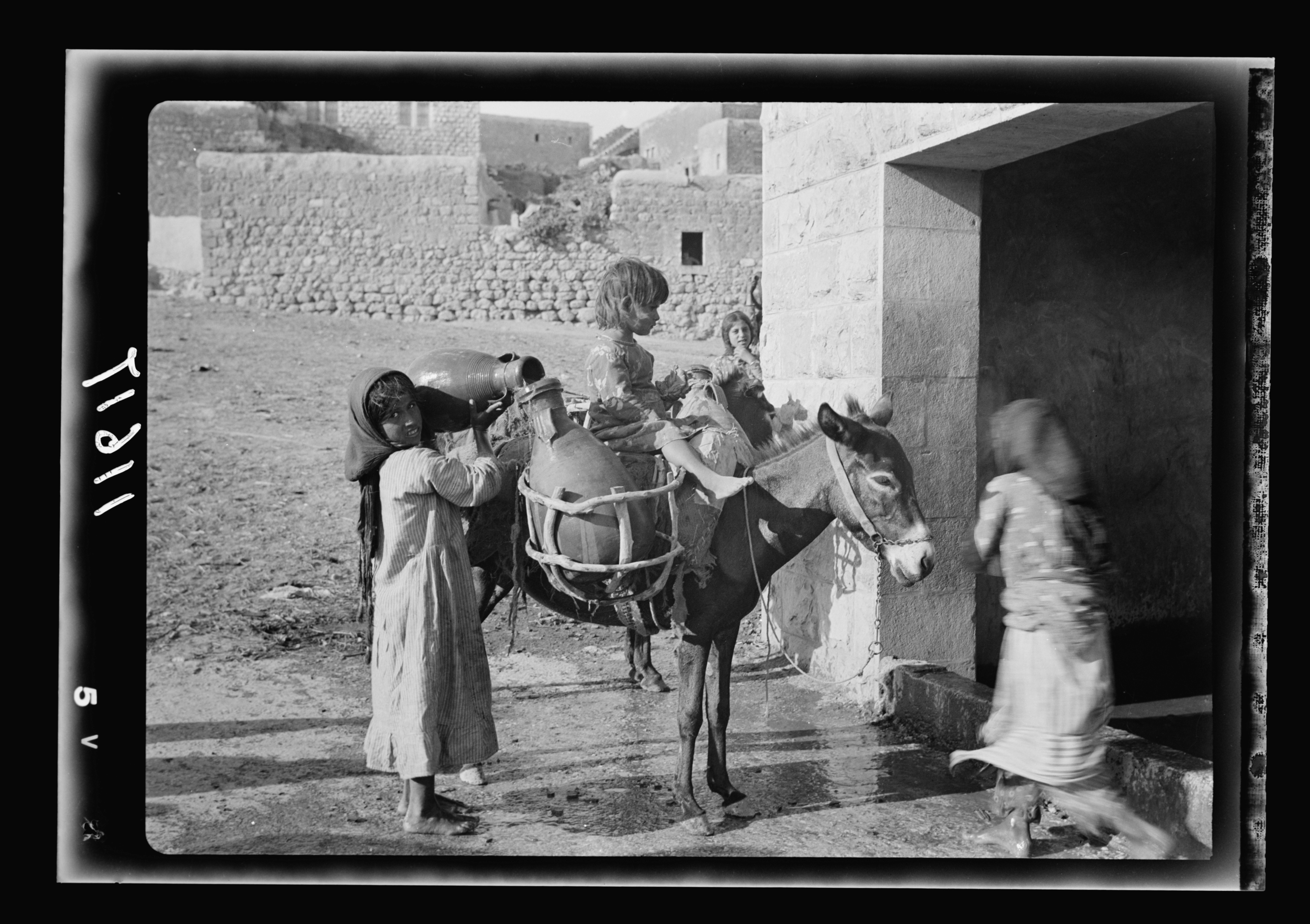
Historical photo of Saforis (Sepphoris). Village girl fetching water in jars carried on donkey back.

Based on numismatic evidence, the synagogue appears to have been built in the first half of the fifth century. It was located on the northern side of the city, not far from the city center. Measuring 20.7 m (68 ft) long and 8 m (26 ft) wide, it is the narrowest ancient synagogue uncovered in the Land of Israel. The bimah was located in the western wall, not oriented towards Jerusalem as in other synagogues of that era.

The Mishna describes Sepphoris as having had 18 synagogues at the time of the funeral of Rabbi Judah haNasi in the late second century CE.

== Discovery ==
The mosaic floor of the ancient synagogue was discovered in 1993 by a crew building a parking lot at the edge of the national archaeological park of Sepphoris. It is one of a handful of illustrated synagogue mosaics uncovered in Israel. Archaeologist Zeev Weiss, then a graduate student at the Hebrew University, and his teacher, archaeologist Ehud Netzer were called to the scene, and Weiss uncovered the floor and its environs.

== Mosaics ==
The mosaic floor is divided into seven parts. Near the entrance is a scene showing the angels visiting Sarah. The next section shows the binding of Isaac. There is a large Zodiac with the names of the months written in Hebrew. Helios sits in the middle, in his sun chariot. Next, there is a row of three panels depicting the offerings in the Temple at Jerusalem, including the "tamid" sacrifice, the showbread and the basket of First Fruits. Above this is a depiction of Aaron offering sacrifices in the Tabernacle. Above that is another row of three panels, a Torah Ark, depicted as a pedimented building, and an incense shovel representing the incense shovels used in the Temple, flanked by two panels each displaying the seven-branched Menorah from the Temple at Jerusalem surrounded by symbols of the Jewish holidays including the Lulav and Shofar. The top, or front of the building section of the floor, another row of three panels, shows two lions flanking a wreath, their paws resting on the head of an ox.

The largest panel or central sections of the mosaic is laid out as a large square containing a circle within a circle. This shows the Zodiac with Helios driving his chariot. As with the Hammat Tiberias Synagogue and the Beit Alfa Synagogue, the Zodiac panel at Sepphoris features Spandrels depicting the four seasons.

An Aramaic mosaic inscription in honor of the donors reads: "May he be remembered for good Yudan son of Isaac the Priest and Paragri his daughter, Amen, Amen."

== Gallery ==
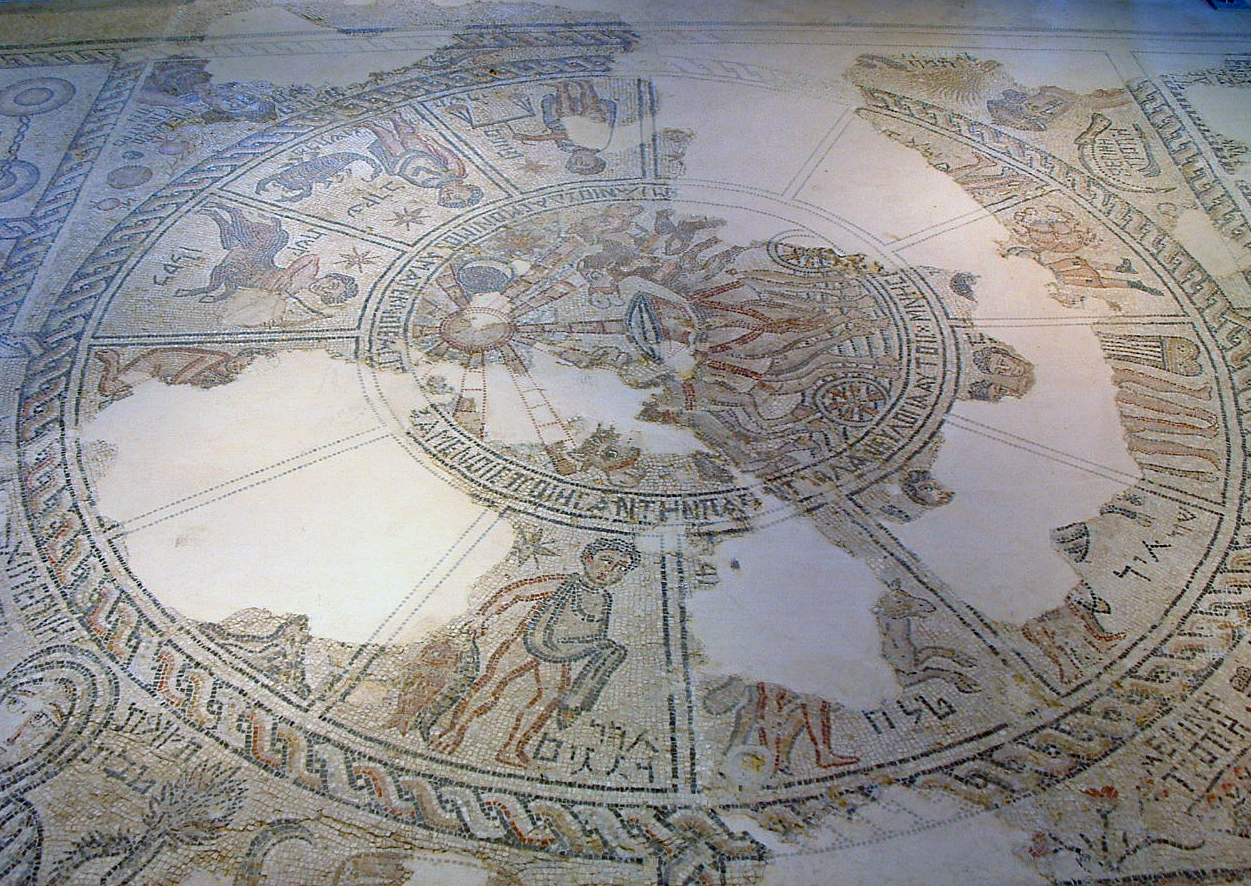
Zodiac wheel mosaic, combining Roman scroll designs with Hebrew lettering

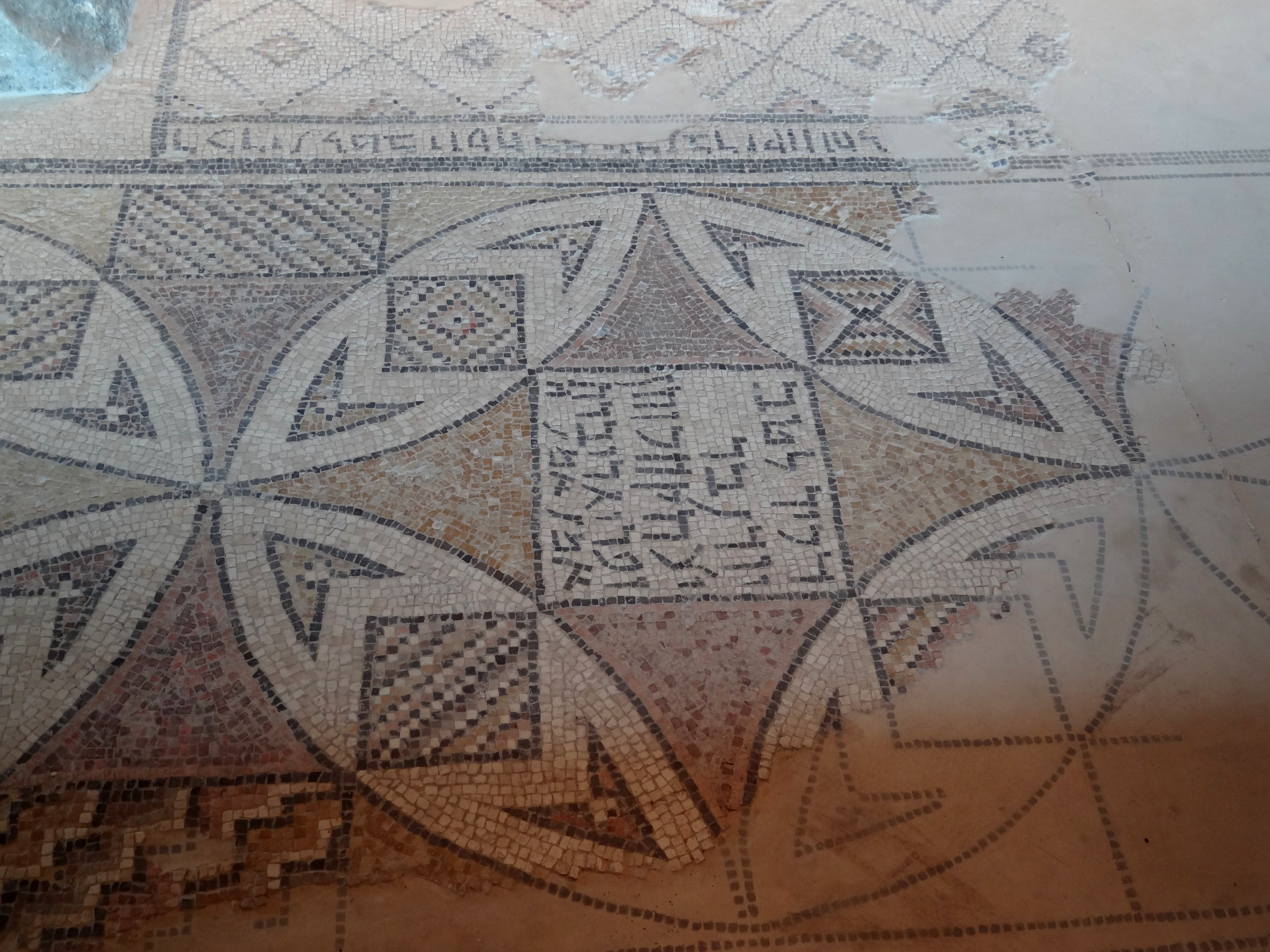
Aramaic inscription

== See also ==
Ancient synagogues

- Ancient synagogues in the Palestine region - covers entire Palestine region/Land of Israel
  - Ancient synagogues in Israel - covers the modern State of Israel
- Oldest synagogues in the world
- Synagogal Judaism

Other topics

- Archaeology in Israel
- Hellenistic Judaism
- Jewish Christianity
- Therapeutae
