= Tell Hammeh =

Archaeological site in Jordan

Coordinates: 32°11′41″N 35°38′56″E

Tell Hammeh (Arabic: تل حمة) is a relatively small tell in the central Jordan Valley, Hashemite Kingdom of Jordan, located where the Zarqa River valley opens into the Jordan Valley. It is the site of some of the earliest bloomery smelting of iron, from around 930 BC. It is close to several of the larger tells in this part of the Jordan Valley (e.g. Tell Deir 'Alla, Tell al-Sa'idiyeh) as well as to the natural resources desirable in metal production: access to water, outcrops of marly clays (see Veldhuijzen 2005b, 297), and above all the only iron ore deposit of the wider region at Mugharet al-Warda.

== Excavation ==
The excavations at Hammeh are part of the Deir 'Alla Regional Project, a joint undertaking of Yarmouk University in Irbid, Jordan, and Leiden University in the Netherlands, in collaboration with the Jordanian Department of Antiquities.

The site's most intriguing feature is the presence of a substantial and very early iron smelting operation, as evidence by large quantities of slag, technical ceramics, furnace remnants etc. This activity dates to 930 BC.

Fieldwork at Tell Hammeh took place in 1996, 1997, and 2000. The first two (rescue) seasons were directed by Dr E.J. van der Steen; the third season was directed by Dr H.A. Veldhuijzen. A fourth season, planned in 2003, had to be abandoned due to the invasion of Iraq. As with the third season, the focus of new excavation would primarily be on the iron smelting evidence. A new excavation was to start in May 2009.

== Research ==
Extensive research has been carried out on the metallurgical material from Tell Hammeh. Both excavation and archaeometric analyses were carried out by Dr H.A. Veldhuijzen, first at Leiden University, then since 2001 at the UCL Institute of Archaeology, as a part of the joint excavations conducted by Yarmouk University and Leiden University and co-directed by Prof. Dr. Zeidan Kafafi and Dr. Gerrit Van der Kooij.

== Chronology and iron smelting activities ==
Several periods are attested at Hammeh. From bedrock upward, remains of Chalcolithic (ca. 4500-3000 BC) and Early Bronze Age (ca. 3000-2000 BC) occupation were found, followed by more substantial layers of Late Bronze Age (ca. 1600-1150 BC) material. Hammeh appears continuously settled through the Late Bronze Age and Iron Age I (ca. 1150-1000 BC), up to the moment when iron production started in the early Iron Age II (see van der Steen 2004).

At that point in time, domestic structures, at least in the excavated areas, cease to exist, and are covered, without a clear interruption, by a stratigraphically well defined phase of iron production. This phase has a complex internal layering, likely reflecting seasonal activity over an extended period of time. (Veldhuijzen 2005a).

This phase consists of large quantities of various types of slag, most belonging to a bloomery iron smelting operation, and a fraction to primary smithing (i.e. bloom-smithing or bloom consolidation).

Very soon or immediately after iron production ceased, habitation of the site resumed. This later Iron Age II phase seems to form the last extensive occupation of Tell Hammeh. Based on examination of the extensive pottery finds from this post-smelting phase, it can be assumed that the iron production activities must have ended no later than 750 BC. No settlement structures contemporary to the iron smelting phase are presently known from Tell Hammeh.

== See also ==
- Hama (disambiguation)
