= Beth Alpha =

Sixth-century CE synagogue

- בית אלפא (Hebrew)
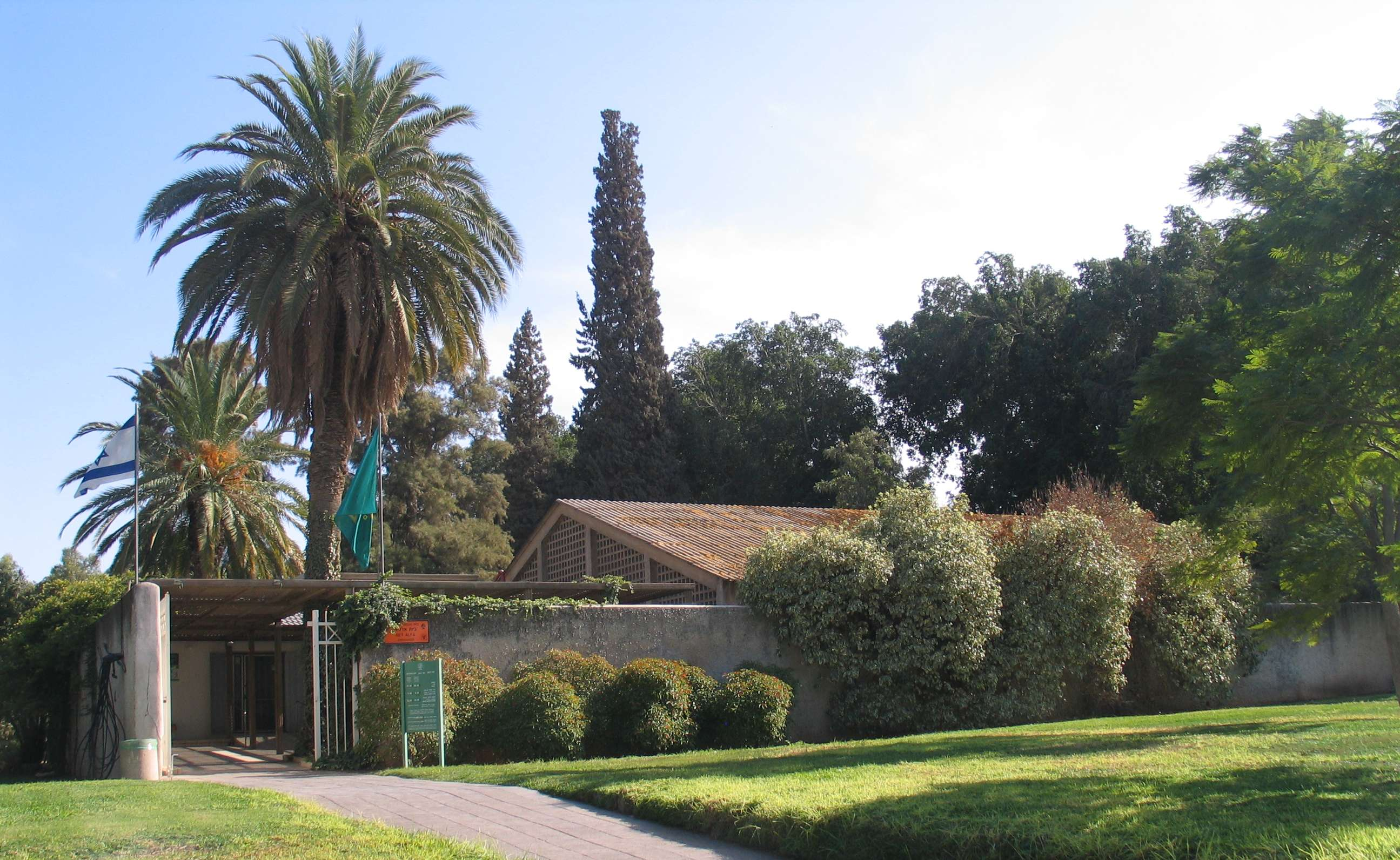
- Entrance to the former synagogue national park, in 2010

- Location of the ancient former synagogue, in northeast Israel

Religion
- Affiliation: Judaism (former)
- Ecclesiastical or organisational status: Ancient synagogue; Archaeological site; National park
- Status: Ruins
- Notable artwork: Mosaic floor

Location
- Location: near Beit She'an, Northern District
- Country: Israel
- Coordinates: 32°31′08″N 35°25′37″E

Architecture
- Type: Basilica
- Style: Byzantine architecture
- Completed: 6th century
- Direction of façade: Southwest

Site notes
- Excavation dates: 1929; 1962
- Archaeologists: Eleazar Sukenik
- Discovered: 1928
- Management: Israel Nature and Parks Authority
- Public access: Yes

Beth Alpha (Hebrew: בֵּית אַלְפָא, romanized: bēṯ alp̄āʾ) is an ancient former Jewish synagogue, located at the foot of the northern slopes of the Gilboa mountains near Beit She'an, in the Northern District of Israel. The synagogue was completed in the sixth century CE and is now part of Bet Alfa Synagogue National Park and managed by the Israel Nature and Parks Authority.

== Excavations ==
The Beth Alpha synagogue was uncovered in 1928 by members of the nearby Kibbutz Beit Alfa, who stumbled upon the synagogue's extensive mosaic floors during irrigation construction. Excavations began in 1929 under the auspices of the Hebrew University of Jerusalem and were led by Israeli archaeologist, Eleazar Sukenik. A secondary round of excavations, sponsored by the Israel Antiquities Authority in 1962, further explored the residential structures surrounding the synagogue.

In addition, a hoard of 36 Byzantine coins were found in a shallow depression in the floor apse.

In November 2026, about twenty conservation specialists from the Israel Nature and Parks Authority worked together to preserve the mosaic floor.

== Architecture ==
Architectural remains from the Beth Alpha synagogue indicate that the synagogue once stood as two-story basilical building and contained a courtyard, vestibule, and prayer hall. The first floor of the prayer hall consisted of a central nave measuring 5.4 m (18 ft) wide, the apse, which served as the resting place for the Torah Ark, the bimah, the raised platform upon which the Torah would have been read, and benches. The Torah Ark within the apse was aligned southwest, in the direction of Jerusalem.

The function of the second floor remains a topic of scholarly disagreement. Eleazar Sukenik proposes that this floor served a different purpose from the first, suggesting that it must have served as a women's gallery (Ezrat Nashim). In contrast, Shmuel Safrai argues that there is no physical or textual evidence to support the idea that the second floor functioned as a women's gallery in synagogues of that period or to gender segregation in synagogues at all. Safrai contends that Soknik's argument is based on an unwarranted inference, drawing parallels from the Second Temple to other synagogues without sufficient proof.

== Dedicatory inscriptions ==
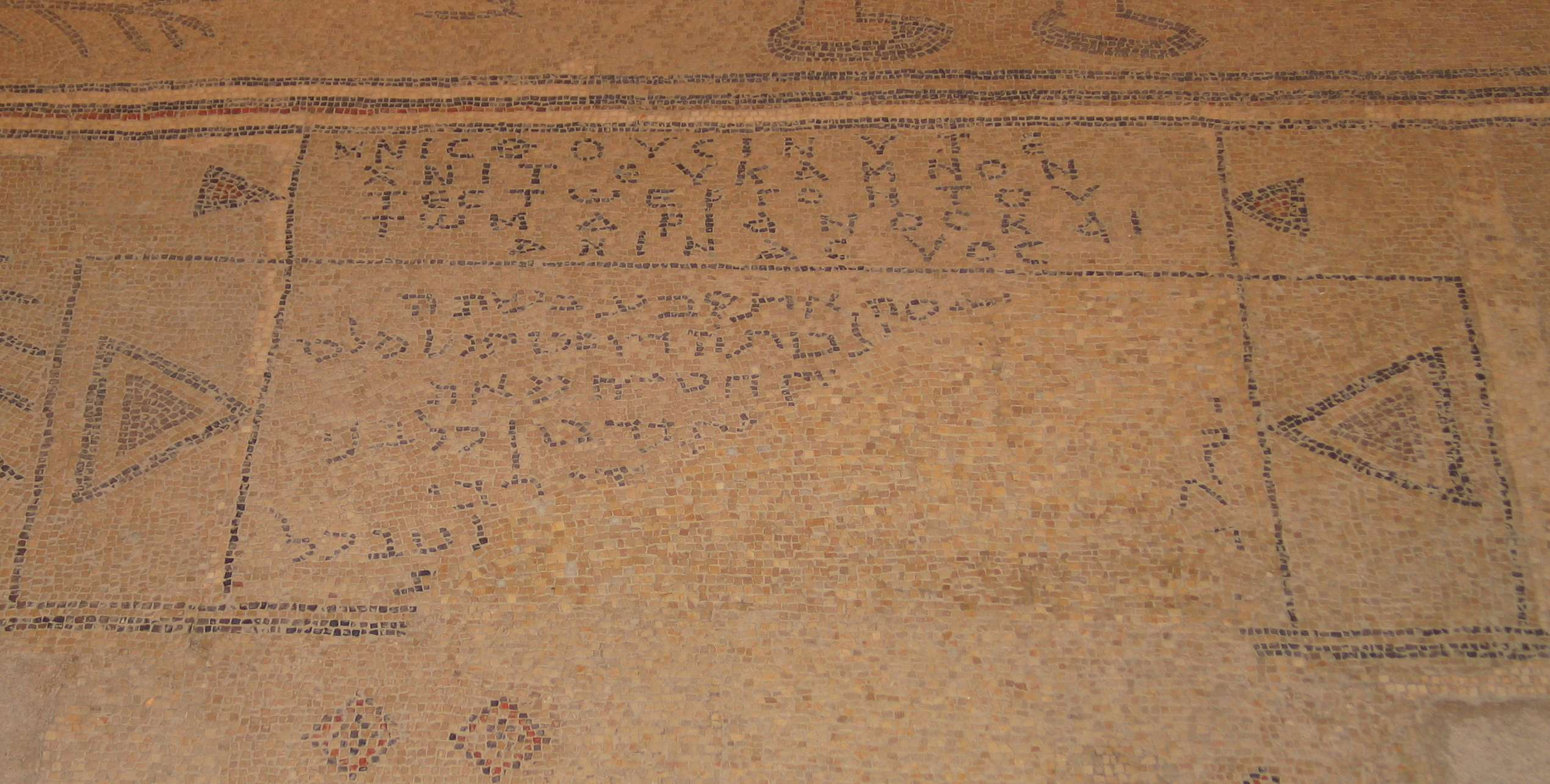
Dedicatory Inscriptions

The northern entryway features two dedicatory inscriptions in Aramaic and Greek. Although partially destroyed, the Aramaic inscription indicates that the synagogue was built during the reign of the Byzantine Emperor Justinus, probably Justin I (518–527 CE), and was funded by communal donations. The Greek inscription thanks artisans "Marianos and his son Hanina", who were also listed as the artisans of the nearby Beth Shean synagogue. The inscriptions are flanked on either side by a lion and a buffalo, who serve as the synagogue's symbolic guardians.

== Nave mosaics ==
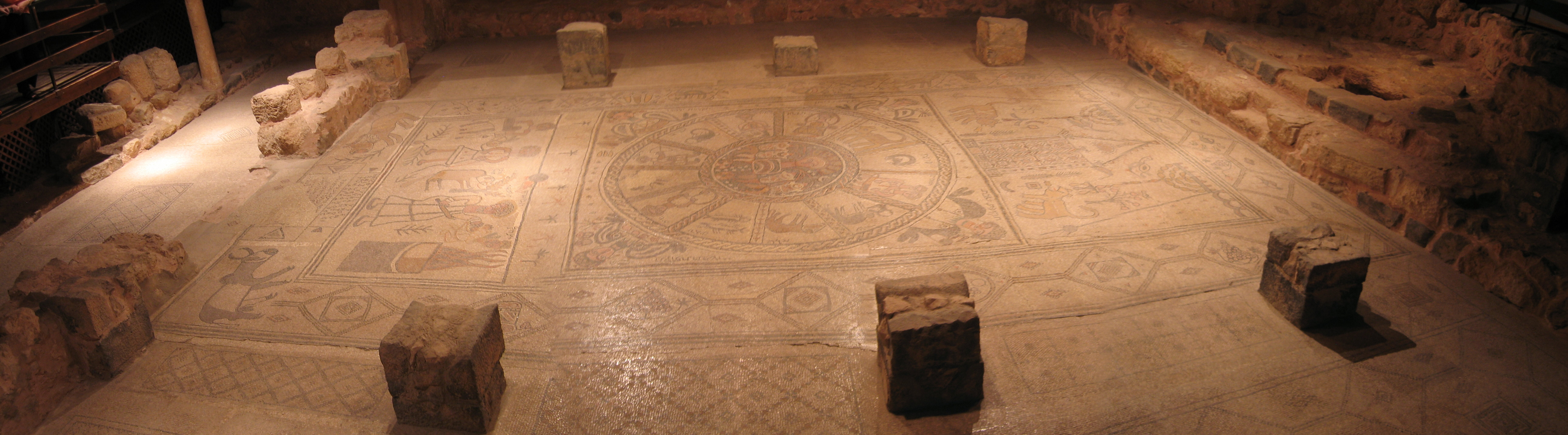
Panorama of Nave Mosaics

=== Northern panel—Binding of Isaac ===
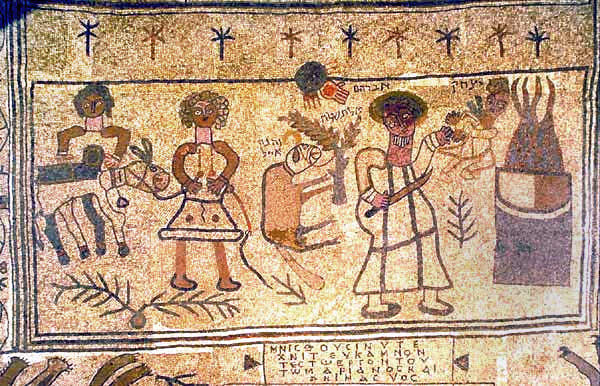
Binding of Isaac

The northern panel depicts the "Binding of Isaac" (Genesis 22: 1–18). To the right, Abraham is depicted dangling Isaac over the fiery altar as he raises his hand to perform the sacrifice. In the center, God, symbolized by the small fire- encircled hand appearing in the upper center, instructs Abraham to sacrifice a nearby ram instead of Isaac. The hand of God is aptly labeled with "al tishlah" or "do not raise", taken from God's command to the angel that Abraham not "raise his hand against the boy [Isaac]" (Genesis 22:12). In the lower center of the composition, immediately below the hand of God, the ram that served as Isaac's substitute is positioned standing sideways, trapped in the nearby thicket. The odd positioning of the ram may perhaps be a convention the artists used to convey the distance that the Bible says separated Abraham and Isaac, from the two servant boys (Genesis 22:5), who accompanied Abraham and Isaac on their journey, and are depicted standing to the left. All the figures in the scene, except for the two servants, are identified with Hebrew labels.

The iconographic significance of the "Binding of Isaac" is unclear. There is a wide variety of opinions, with some scholars seeing this narrative as an affirmation of God's mercy, others as symbolic of his continuing covenant with Israel, and others as embodying the rabbinic notion of "zechut avot" or the merit of the fathers. In contemporaneous Christian church art, where the "Binding of Isaac" was also a popular theme, the narrative was seen as a typological pre-figuration for the crucifixion.

=== Central panel—zodiac wheel ===
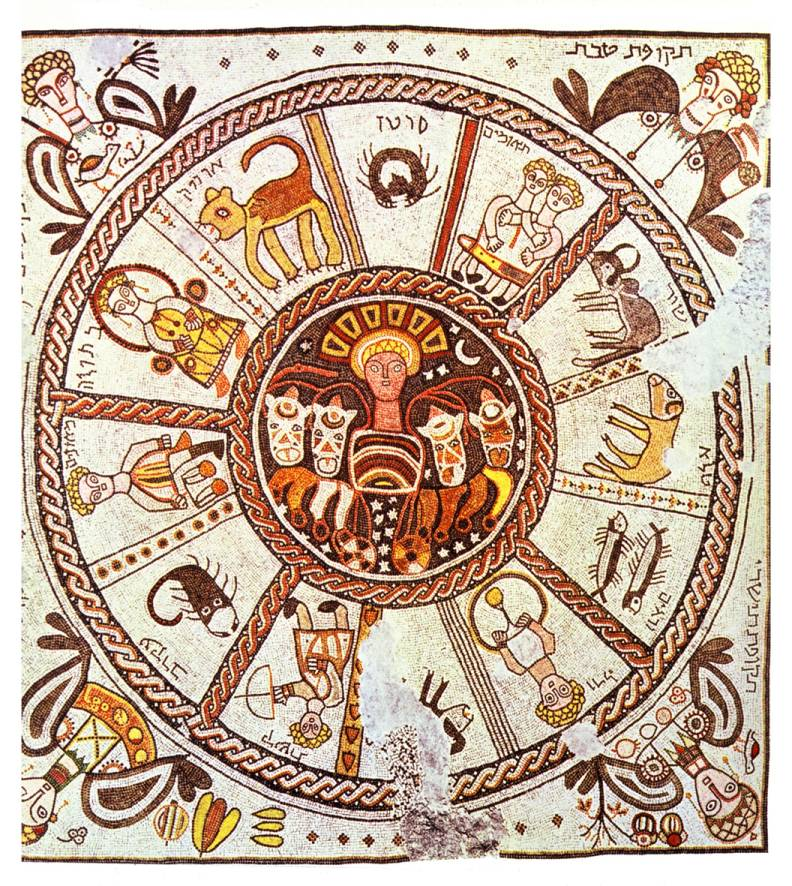
Zodiac Wheel with Hebrew Labels

The central panel features a Jewish zodiac. The zodiac consists of two concentric circles, with the twelve zodiac signs appearing in the outer circle, and Helios, the Greco-Roman sun god, appearing in the inner circle. The outer circle consists of twelve panels, each of which correspond to one of the twelve months of the year and contain the appropriate Greco-Roman zodiac sign. Female busts symbolizing the four seasons appear in the four corners immediately outside the zodiac. In the center, Helios appears with his signature Greco-Roman iconographic elements such as the fiery crown of rays adorning his head and the highly stylized quadriga or four-horse-drawn chariot. The background is decorated with a crescent shaped moon and stars. As in the "Binding of Isaac" panel, the zodiac symbols and seasonal busts are labeled with their corresponding Hebrew names.

This zodiac wheel, along with other similar examples found in contemporaneous synagogues throughout Israel such as Naaran, Susiya, Hamat Tiberias, Huseifa, and Sepphoris, rest at the center of a scholarly debate regarding the relationship between Judaism and general Greco-Roman culture in late-antiquity. Some interpret the popularity that the zodiac maintains within synagogue floors as evidence for its Judaization and adaptation into the Jewish calendar and liturgy. Others see it as representing the existence of a "non-Rabbinic" or a mystical and Hellenized form of Judaism that embraced the astral religion of Greco-Roman culture. Still others see it as simply a common decorative pattern, whose pagan origin was probably forgotten by the time the synagogues were built.

=== Southern panel—synagogue scene ===
The southern panel, which was laid before the synagogue's Torah ark, is a liturgically oriented scene emphasizing its centrality. The ark stands at the center of the composition and is depicted with a gabled roof. The ark is decorated with ornamented panels featuring diamonds and squares. The floating conch shell, seen in the center of the roof, is a stylized representation of the ark's inset arch. A hanging lamp is suspended from the roof's gable. As a symbolic marker of its importance, the lower register of the Torah Shrine is flanked by two roaring lions and is surrounded by Jewish ritual objects such as the lulav, etrog, shofar, and incense shovel. Two birds flank the gabled roof in the upper register of the Torah Shrine.

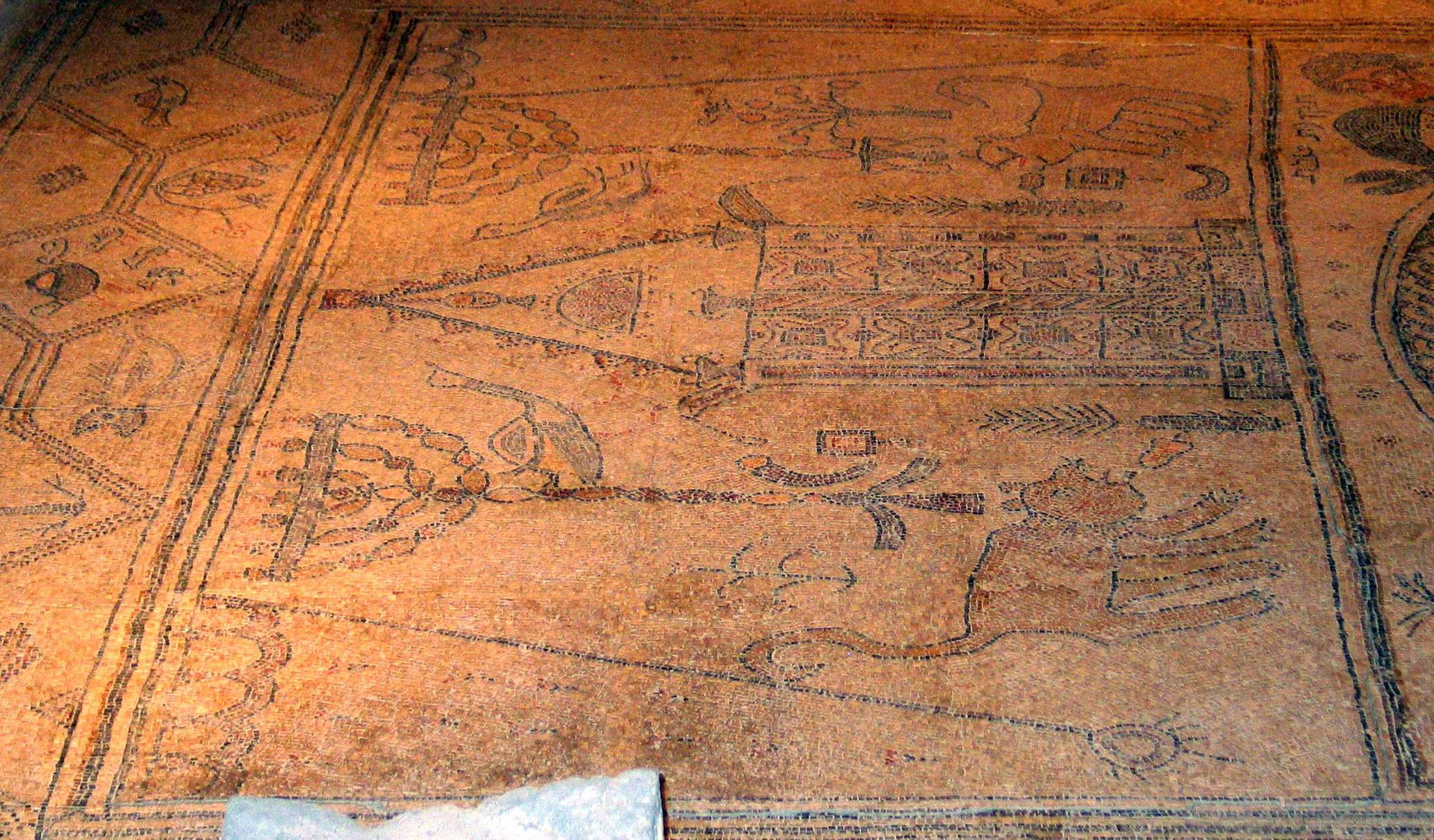
Synagogue scene

Two large, seven-branched Temple menorahs stand on either side of the ark. The base and branches of the two menorahs are not identical in form; the right-hand one has an upright base, while the left-hand one has two crescent-shaped legs and one upright leg. Lastly, the entire scene is framed by the two pulled-back parochets, which demarcate the ark's sacred space.

The presence of the menorahs, which originally stood in the Temple in Jerusalem, highlights the continuing importance that the Jerusalem Temple occupied in the development of the synagogue. Additionally, the menorahs maintained a practical function as the primary light source for the area around the ark. Sukenik believed that the two Menorot depicted flanking the ark in this scene, likely stood adjacent to the Torah Shrine within the actual Beth Alpha synagogue.

== See also ==
- Ancient synagogues in the Palestine region
  - Ancient synagogues in Israel
- Archaeology of Israel
- Hammat Tiberias
- Hellenistic Judaism
- History of the Jews and Judaism in the Land of Israel
- Jewish Christianity
- List of synagogues in Israel
- Synagogal Judaism
- Therapeutae
- Zodiac mosaics in ancient synagogues
  - Or Torah Synagogue, Akko, Israel: has dome with zodiac mosaic copied after one at Beth Alpha
