= Hamas (disambiguation) =

Hamas is an abbreviation for the Islamic Resistance Movement.

Hamas or hamas may also refer to:

- Hamas of Iraq, a Sunni militia group in Iraq
- Movement of Society for Peace, an Islamic political party in Algeria formerly known as Hamas
- Hamas (horse), an Irish-bred Thoroughbred racehorse
- Steve Hamas (1907–1974), an American football player and boxer

== See also ==
- Hama (disambiguation)
- Hamas Charter (disambiguation)
- Khamas (disambiguation)
- Islamic Resistance Movement of Azerbaijan
- Jewish Resistance Movement
