= Human anti-mouse antibody =

Antibody found in humans

Human anti-mouse antibody or human anti-murine antibody (HAMA) is an antibody found in humans which reacts to immunoglobins found in mice.

== The HAMA response ==
Antibody treatment is a type of therapy that is used to treat certain types of cancer and immune disorders. Antibodies are proteins which are naturally formed by the body in response to a foreign substance, known as an antigen. Antibodies can also be grown outside of the patient’s body and injected into them to help aid the immune system to fight disease. These types of antibodies are typically called monoclonal antibodies because they are created to target one specific antigen. Herceptin and Avastin, two widely used cancer fighting drugs, are examples of monoclonal antibodies.

For several decades, and until recently, mice were used extensively in the production of monoclonal antibodies (MAbs). But the treatments were not as effective as doctors had hoped. One problem was that patients reacted to the mouse antibodies as if they were a foreign substance, and created a new set of antibodies to the mouse antibodies. Doctors have termed this the “HAMA response,” referring to the development of Human Anti-Mouse Antibodies (HAMA). The HAMA response is essentially an allergic reaction to the mouse antibodies that can range from a mild form, like a rash, to a more extreme and life-threatening response, such as kidney failure. HAMA can also decrease the effectiveness of the treatment, or create a future reaction if the patient is given a subsequent treatment containing mouse antibodies.

It has been observed that anywhere from one-third to more than half of patients receiving mouse-derived antibodies will develop some form of HAMA response. Even more startling, at least ten percent of the general population has been observed to carry some form of animal-derived antibodies, most often from mice, due to the preponderance of medical agents made from the serum of animals.

Monoclonal antibodies can be generated for human use without mice by using in vitro techniques. MAbs manufactured using these methods do not suffer from the drawbacks related to the HAMA response. Animal protection groups fought for years to end MAb production in mice because it causes intense suffering for the animals that includes severe abdominal pain, difficulty breathing and death.

It took considerable, sustained pressure from animal welfare groups, led by legal efforts initiated by the American Anti-Vivisection Society, before this would change. Today in vitro methods of MAb production are recognized and promoted by the National Institutes of Health and are required of all investigators who receive federal funding if their work involves producing MAbs.

The existence of HAMA can complicate laboratory measurements. HAMA interferences can give false positive or negative immunoassay results. HAMA bridging interference produces artificially higher results because HAMA's bind to immobilized mouse antibodies in place of substrate, secondary labeled antibodies will then bind to HAMA and produce a positive signal falsely indicative of substrate presence. In this manner, HAMA provides a bridge between immobilized antibodies and labeled secondary antibodies. In contrast, HAMA blocking interference produces no signal for substrate presence when substrate is present. HAMAs will capture immobilized mouse antibodies. In the heterogeneous immunoassay the separation step will wash away the free substrate unable to bind due to HAMA blocking; only the immobilized mouse antibodies and the HAMA remain in the immunoassay when the labeled secondary antibodies are administered. Since the substrate will no longer be able to bind to the immobilized mouse antibodies because of HAMA interference, labeled secondary antibodies will not give a signal for substrate presence.
