= Khamasi =

Khamasi خماسي
- Village
- Location within Iran
- Coordinates: 31°26′36″N 48°39′23″E
- Country: Iran
- Province: Khuzestan
- County: Ahvaz
- Bakhsh: Central
- Rural District: Elhayi

Population (2006)
  - Total: 206
- Time zone: UTC+3:30 (IRST)
  - Summer (DST): UTC+4:30 (IRDT)

Khamasi (Persian: خماسي, also Romanized as Khamāsī; also known as Ḩammāsī and Hommāsī) is a village in Elhayi Rural District, in the Central District of Ahvaz County, Khuzestan Province, Iran. At the 2006 census, its population was 206, in 40 families.
