= Hammat Tiberias =

Israeli national park and archaeological site

- חמת טבריה (Hebrew)
- Hammath Tiberias, Hamat Tiberias
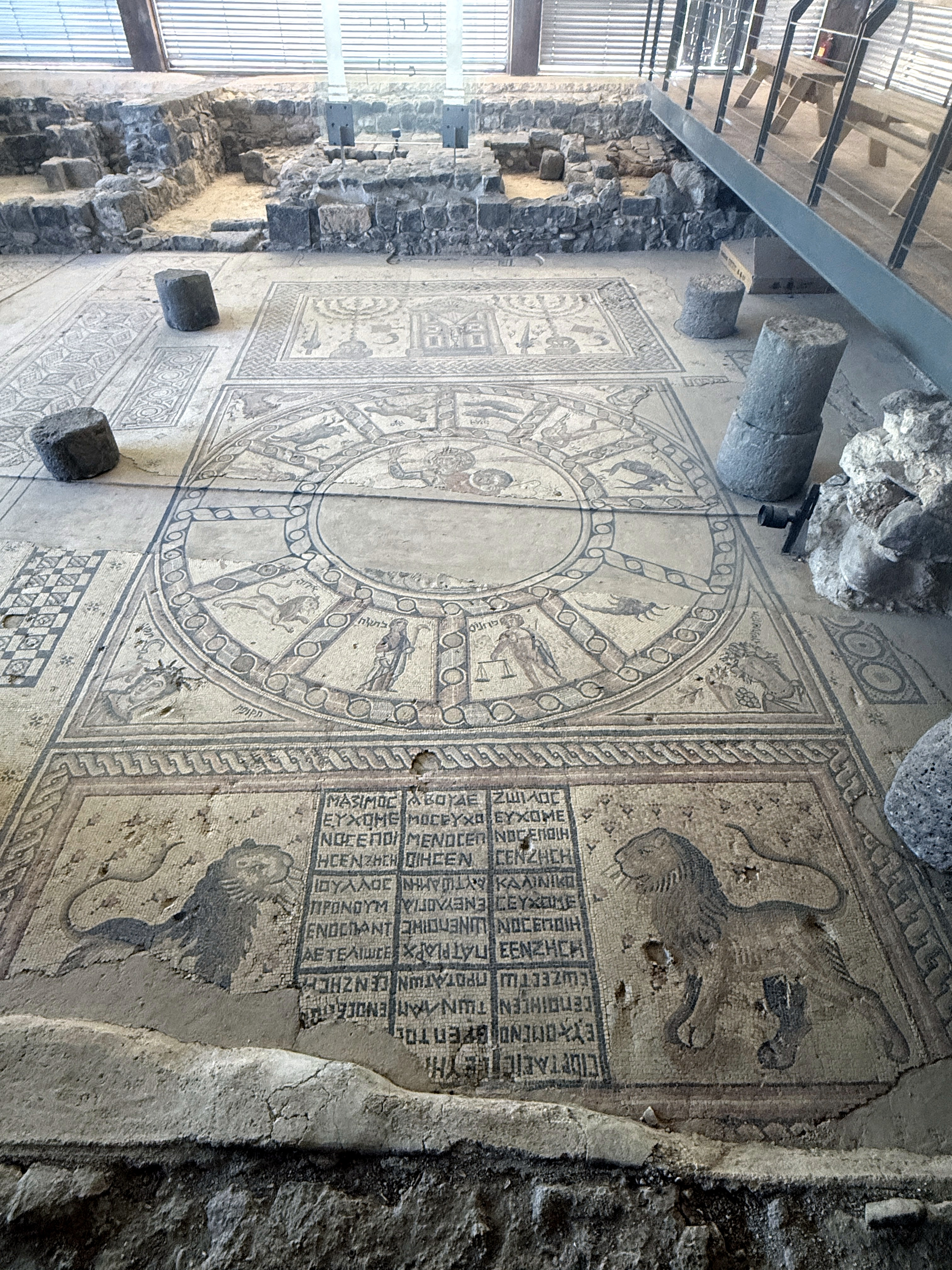
- Mosaic floor in the synagogue

- Location within Israel
- 32°46′00″N 35°33′04″E
- Type: Settlement, thermal springs, synagogue complex
- Periods: Roman Palestine; Late Roman; Byzantine Palestine
- Cultures: Second Temple and Talmudic-era Judaism
- Location: Tiberias, Israel
- Region: Galilee

History
- Built: 1st century CE (earliest remains)
- Abandoned: 8th century CE
- Event: Earthquake destruction (early 5th century CE)

Site notes
- Architectural style: Roman basilical plan
- Excavation dates: 1921, 1961-1963
- Archaeologists: Nahum Slouschz, Moshe Dothan
- Discovered: 1920
- Condition: Partially preserved
- Management: Israel Nature and Parks Authority
- Public access: Yes
- Website: en.parks.org.il//reserve-park/hamat-tiberias-national-park/

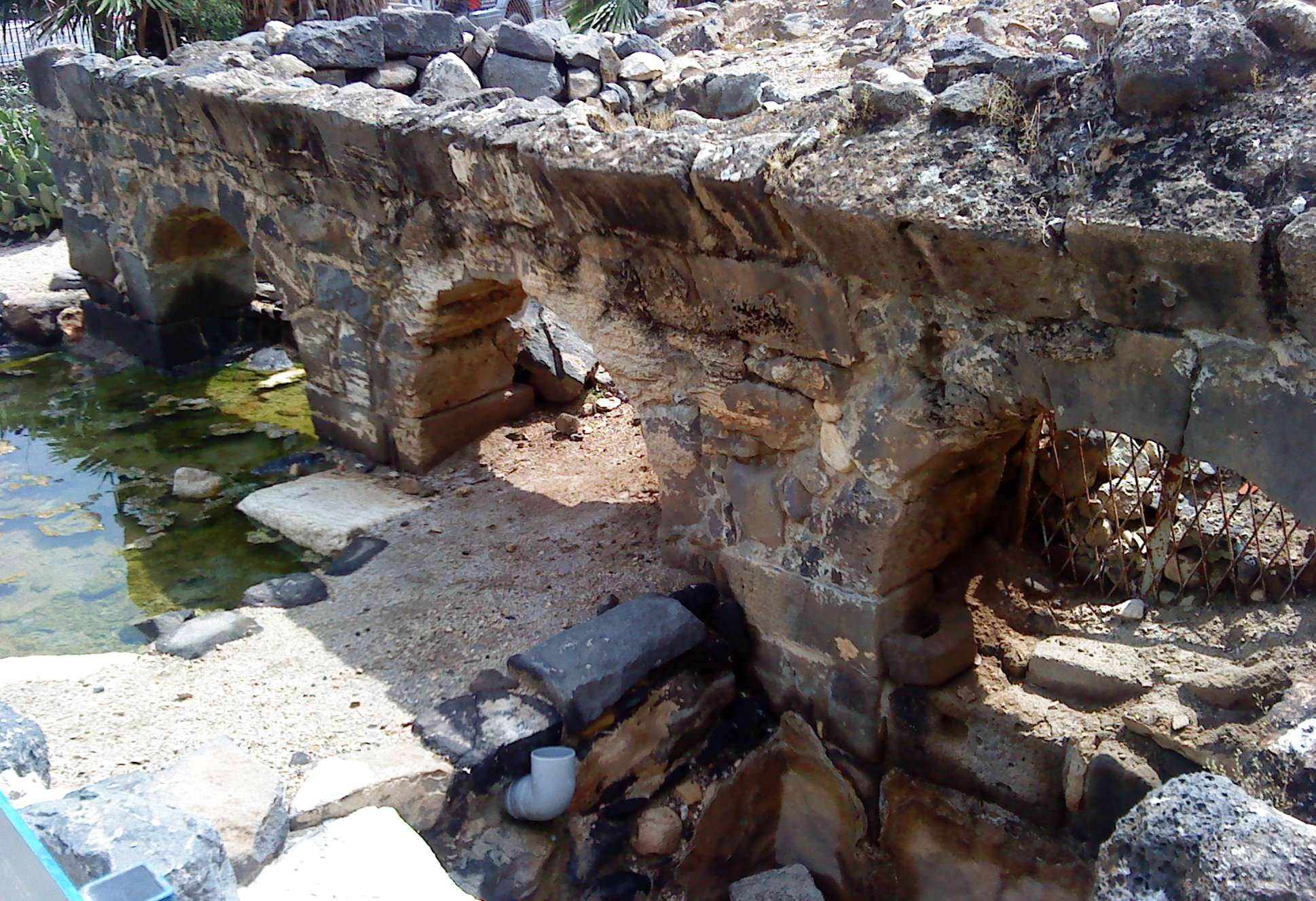
Ancient ruins at the hot springs

Hammath Tiberias or Hammat Tiberias (Hebrew: חמת טבריה) is an ancient archaeological site and Israeli national park, located at the southern end of Tiberias along the road to Zemach, on the western shore of the Sea of Galilee.

== Name ==
Hammath or Hamma is the Hebrew and Semitic word for "hot (spring)." Hammat Tiberias is adjacent to the ancient city of Tiberias, which was established in the first century; Since several places bore the name Hammath, these springs and the resort were called Hammat Tiberias. The Arabic name uses the cognate word: hammam.

== History ==
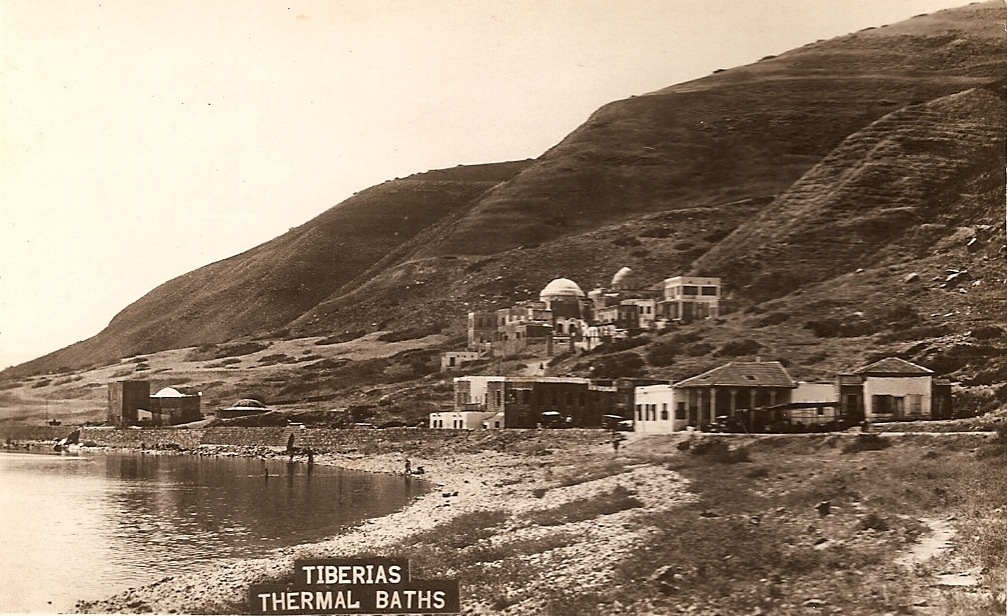
Tiberias thermal baths, 1925

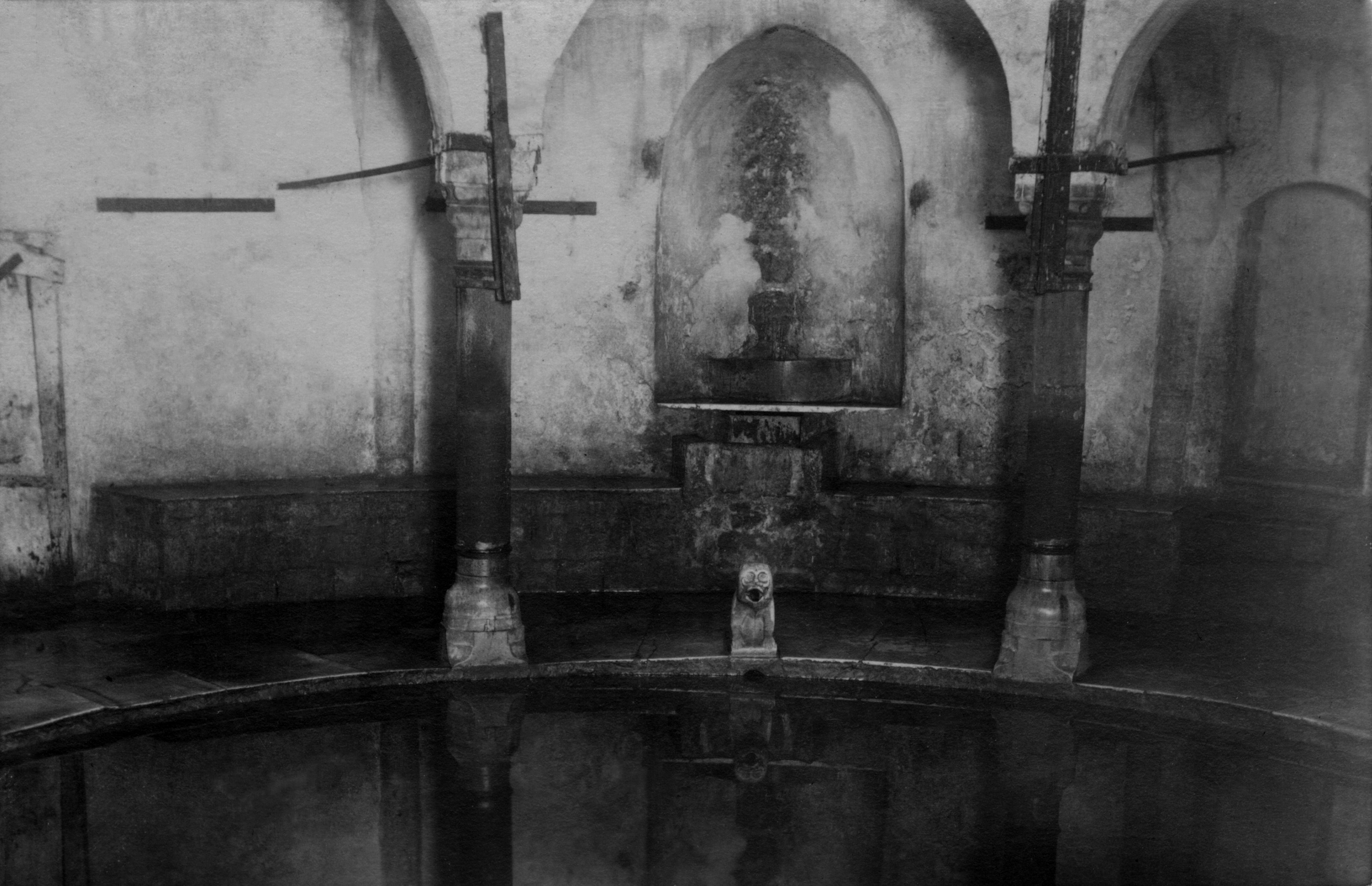
Thermal hot springs, Tiberias, 1924. From the digital collections of Younes & Soraya Nazarian Library, University of Haifa

The 17 springs of Hamat Tiberias have been known since antiquity for their curative properties. According to the Jerusalem Talmud, a village once rested upon the site and was distinct from Tiberias. The site was rediscovered in 1920, when the Tiberias-Samakh road was being constructed.

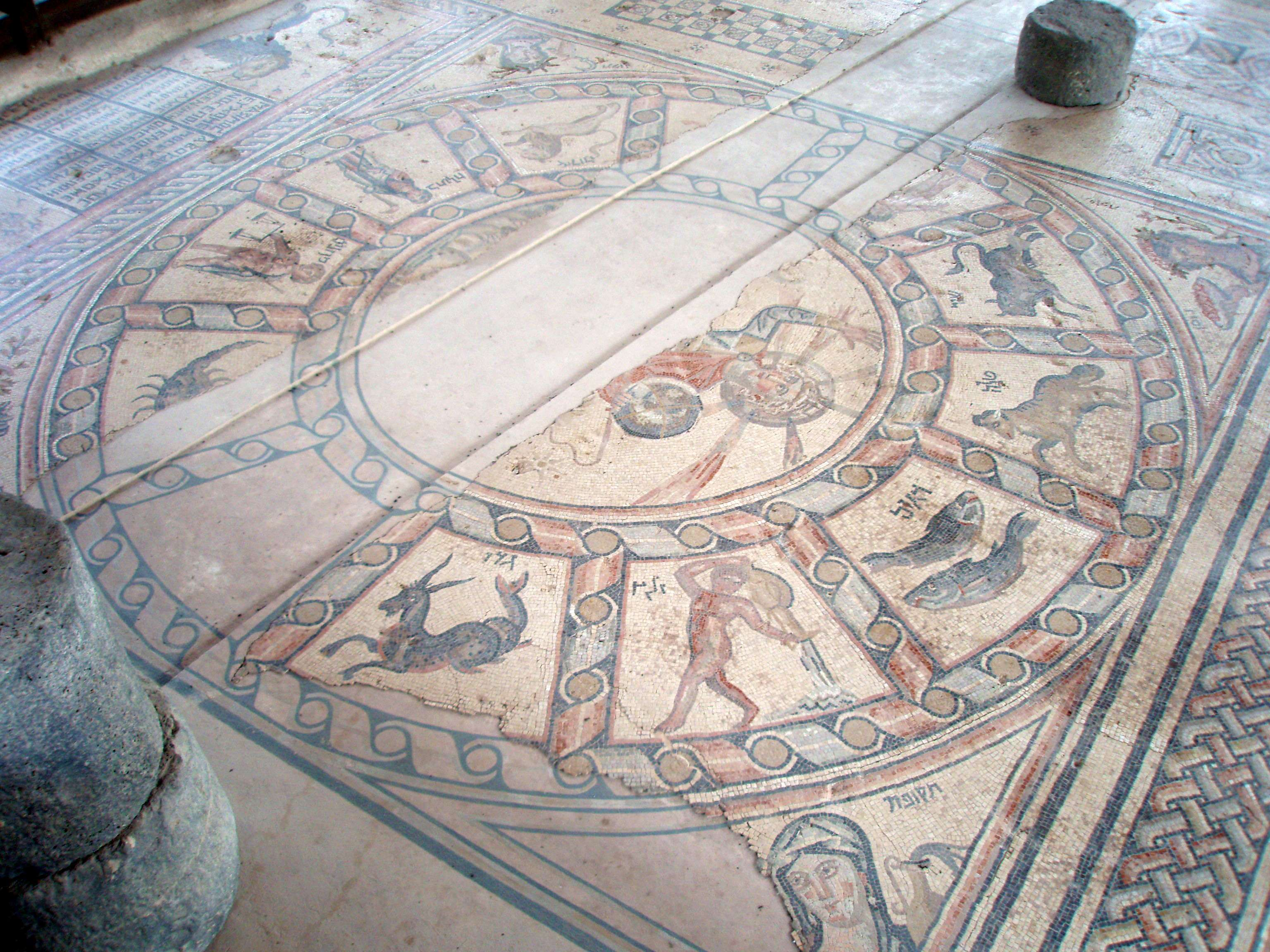
Zodiac mosaic floor in ancient synagogue

Natural hot springs are located on the grounds of the park. According to the sages of the Talmud, the springs were heated when they streamed past the entrance of Hell. Archaeologists have concluded it was built on the ruins of the biblical city of Hammath. However, the finds of the excavations are limited to the 1st-8th centuries CE. The small town eventually merged with Tiberias.

In the Book of Chronicles, the families of scribes at Jabez are said to be "Kenites that come from Hammath, the father of the house of Rechab".

== Synagogues ==
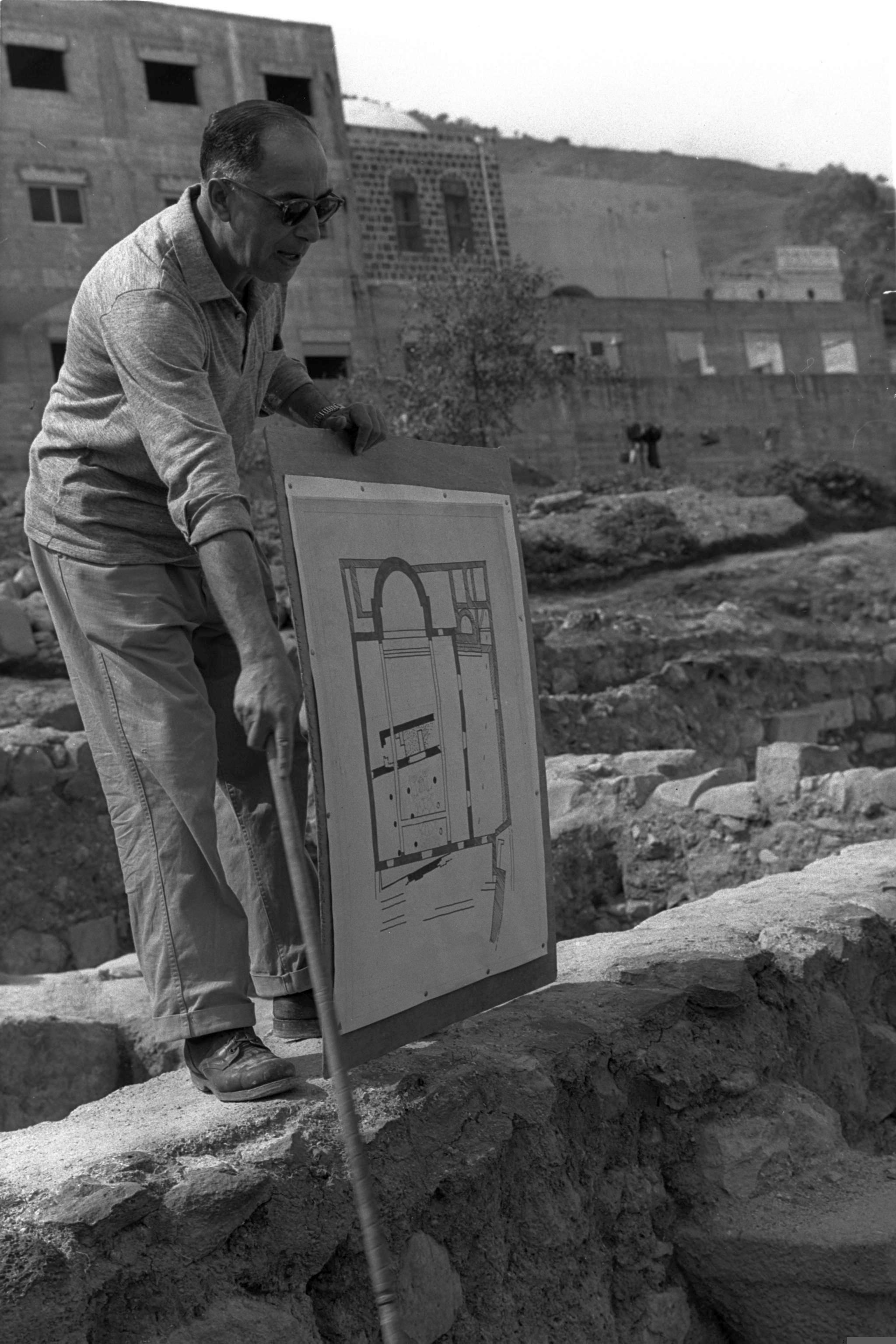
Moshe Dothan, in charge of excavations at the Severus Synagogue site

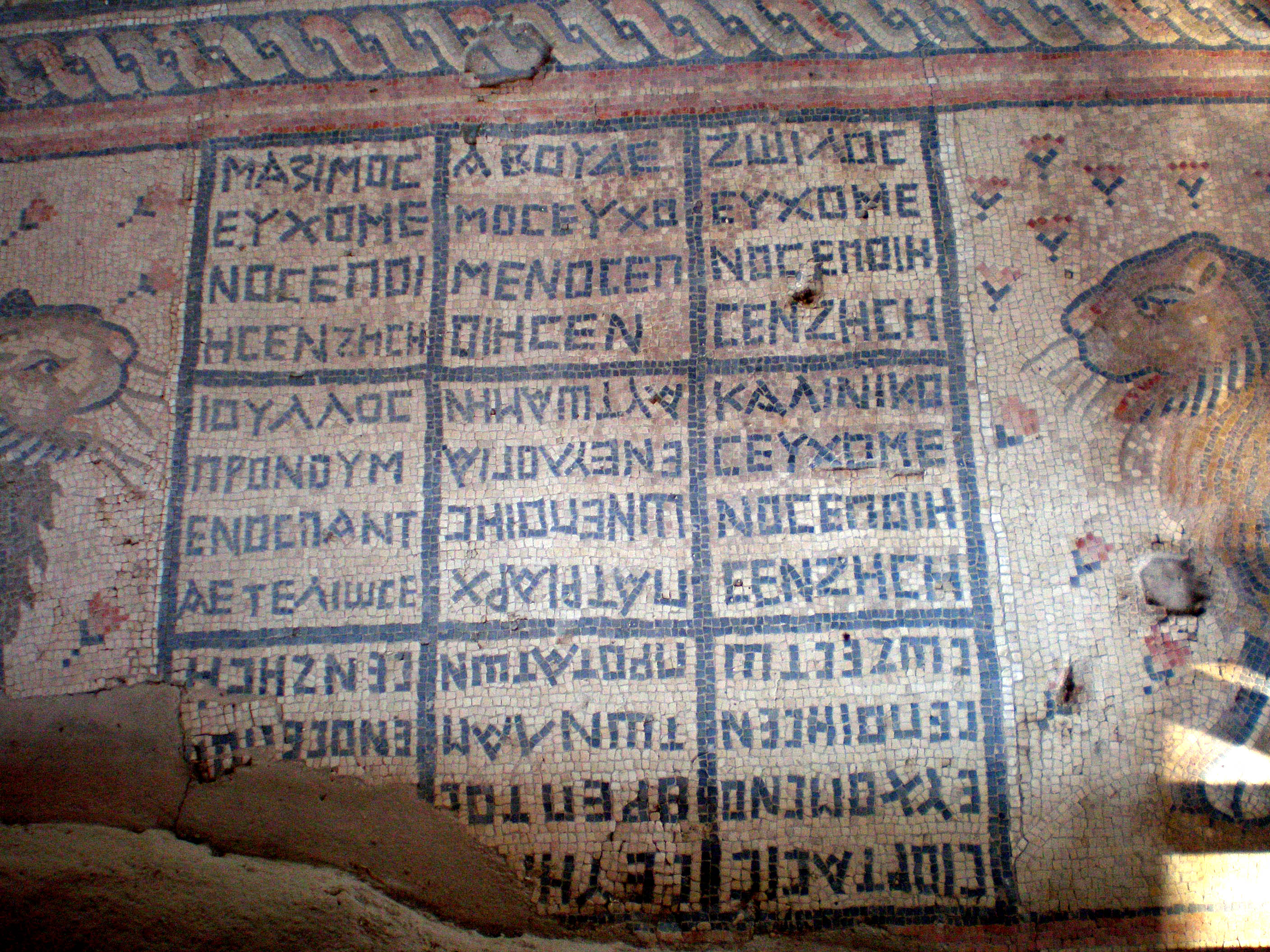
Ancient Greek inscription on the Hellenistic mosaic floor of the Severus synagogue

Two synagogue sites have been excavated at Hammat Tiberias. The context in which they were built is that Tiberias became the seat of the Sanhedrin, the Jewish high court of religious law, from 193 CE to the late 4th century, when Emperor Theodosius I prohibited its activity.

=== Hammath Tiberias North ===
The first synagogue was discovered on the lake shore, the site being now covered by a hotel. It was uncovered in 1921 by Nachum Slouschz who was working under the sponsorship of the Jewish Palestine Exploration Society (JPES) and the Department of Antiquities, was a watershed event in the history of archaeology in the Land of Israel as the first archaeological dig conducted under Jewish auspices.

Synagogue A, as it is known to archaeologists, stood on the shore of the Sea of Galilee, some 500 metres north of the city's south wall. The synagogue had the shape of a square basilical hall with a courtyard. It was built in three stages, without any change to the shape and size of the main hall: first built in c. 250 CE, the main period of occupation was in the 4th-5th centuries, with a third period of use (whether as a synagogue is unclear) until the 10th-11th centuries. The mosaic floor was relaid several times, and the entrance, initially located, as typical for the "Galilee synagogue" type, on the southern side, was moved in the second phase to the northern wall, and in the third to the western wall.

A 60 cm tall limestone menorah was uncovered there, which is now on display at the Israel Museum. An inscribed "Chair of Moses" was found in the eastern aisle.

=== "Synagogue of Severus" ===
The remains of Hammat Tiberias's "Synagogue B", or "Synagogue of Severus", are adjacent to the southern city wall, within the national park and protected by a modern structure. Being the better known of the two, it is popularly simply referred to as the "Hammat Tiberias Synagogue". It was excavated by Moshe Dothan in 1961-3, and is noted for its elaborate mosaic floor, dated to the second half of the fourth century CE, which makes them the earliest mosaic pavement found in a synagogue.

The archaeologists distinguished four stages of construction for the building: a 1st-century public building with rooms placed around a courtyard; a first synagogue was built around 230 CE and was apparently destroyed during the same century; a 4th-century synagogue (boasting the famous mosaic floor), apparently destroyed by an early-5th-century earthquake; and a much larger synagogue built in the 5th-6th centuries above the older one, and eventually destroyed in the 8th century.

All that only remains visible of the first, 3rd-century synagogue, it is a small mosaic section now displayed slightly below the southern edge of the central mosaic.

==== Helios and zodiac mosaic ====
The famous mosaic floor dates from the later phase of the 4th-century synagogue, and is made up of three panels featuring: a Torah shrine flanked by two seven-branched menorahs; a zodiac wheel set around an image of Helios; and a group of Greek inscriptions flanked by two lions.

Next to the Torah shrine in the first panel are also other Jewish ritualistic objects: two of the four species of plants (the lulab and ethrog), the shofar horn, and incense shovel. Nine of the 12 zodiac signs in the second panel survived intact. The signs are arranged counterclockwise, with four women symbolizing the manifestation of the four seasons in nature in the corners. Libra is represented by a nude male uncircumcised figure, which led to speculations that the artist was not Jewish. Helios is driving his quadriga and holding the celestial sphere and a whip. The large inscription from the third panel mention names are of donors and consists of nine squares, two of which are dedicated to one major contributor: "Severus, the pupil of the most illustrious Patriarchs, has made this blessing. Amen." The "patriarchs" seem to be the Jewish community leaders. However, all the personal names in the inscriptions are Greek. This fact, along with the depiction of the Greek god Helios and the naked figures, are not unique to this ancient synagogue and seem to indicate a degree of self-confident cohabitation of Judaism with pagan Hellenistic cultures. The name Severus occurs several times in the inscriptions, which lead the excavators to name the building the "Synagogue of Severus".

== See also ==
- Beth Alpha
- Hama (disambiguation)
- Hellenistic Judaism
- Jewish Christianity
- Synagogal Judaism
- Therapeutae
- Tzippori Synagogue
- Zodiac mosaics in ancient synagogues
