= Naaran =

Ancient village and synagogue in the West Bank, Palestine

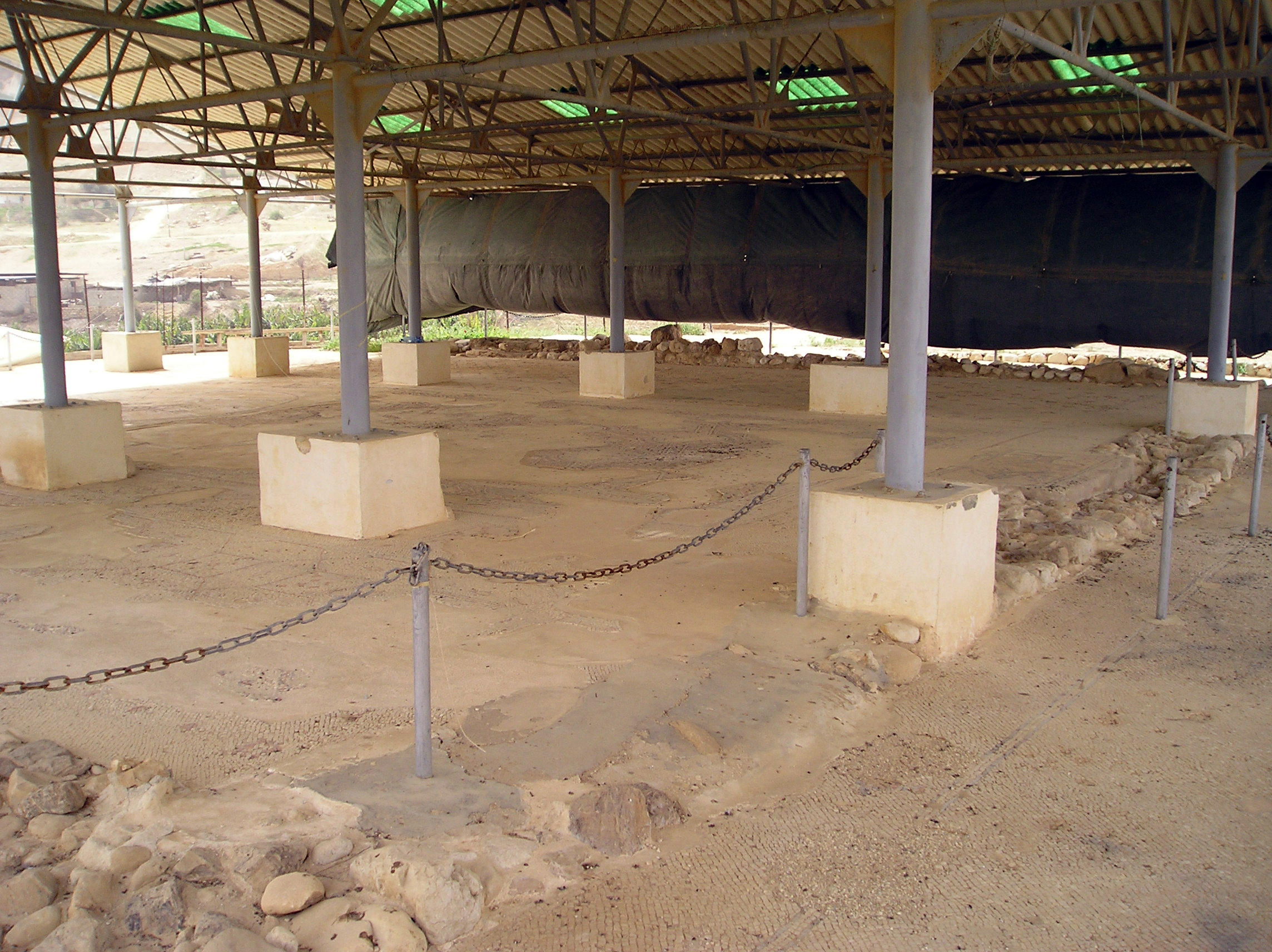
- Remnants of former Naaran synagogue mosaic

- Location of the ancient settlement in the West Bank
- 31°53′37″N 35°25′28″E
- Type: Village and ancient synagogue
- Location: West Bank, State of Palestine

Site notes
- Excavation dates: 1918; 1920; 1970s
- Archaeologists: Charles Clermont-Ganneau; Louis-Hugues Vincent

Naaran (also Na'aran) (Hebrew: נערן) was an ancient Jewish village dating to the 5th and 6th century CE, located in the modern-day West Bank, in the State of Palestine. Remains of the village have been excavated north-west of Jericho. Naaran is archeologically notable for the mosaic floor of a synagogue, featuring a large zodiac design, which was discovered at the site.

Naaran is identified with Ein ad-Duk, now within the municipal boundaries of Jericho, 5 km (3.1 mi) north-west of the city center.

== Settlement ==
Naaran is mentioned in Joshua 16:7 and 1 Chronicles 7:28 as a town in the eastern part of Ephraim. Eusebius, in his Onomasticon, makes mention of the site, saying that in his day it was "a village inhabited by Jews, five [Roman] miles from Jericho." The site is also named in the writings of Josephus (Antiquities 17.13.1), under its Greek name Νεαρά, and in the Midrash Rabba (Leviticus Rabbah 23:5), which notes the rivalry between Naaran and the neighboring gentile city of Jericho.

Excavations in the vicinity of the synagogue have yielded structures dated to the Byzantine Empire period.

== Synagogue ==
In 1918, during WWI in Palestine, a Turkish shell fired at Australian and New Zealand troops exposed part of a mosaic floor. It was initially misidentified as a church, but later Charles Clermont-Ganneau recognised it as a synagogue. Louis-Hugues Vincent conducted excavations in the 1920s, but the site remained largely untouched until the 1970s. Despite literary evidence of the antiquity of the settlement, little information about the age of the synagogue is available. Some scholars suggest the 5th and 6th centuries CE on architectural grounds. Aramaic inscriptions and mosaics from the synagogue are displayed at an archaeology museum established by the Israeli archaeologist Yitzhak Magen at the Good Samaritan Inn.

An Israeli settlement, kibbutz Na'aran, located 8 km (5.0 mi) to the north, takes its name from Naaran.

== See also ==
- Ancient synagogues in the Palestine region - covers entire Palestine region/Land of Israel
  - Ancient synagogues in Israel
- Archaeology of Israel
- History of the Jews in Palestine
- List of oldest synagogues
- Shalom Al Yisrael Synagogue
- Yitav
- Zodiac mosaics in ancient synagogues
