= Khirbet Abu ad-Danin =

Archaeological site in the central West Bank

- Kh. Abu ed-Dinein
- Interactive map of Khirbet Abu ad-Danin
- 31°55′31.9″N 35°02′17.1″E
- Type: village
- Periods: Hellenistic, Roman periods (Jewish village); Late Roman, Byzantine periods (limited reoccupation)
- Location: West Bank
- Region: Shephelah
- New Israel Grid: 153/148

History
- Built: 2nd century BCE
- Abandoned: Bar Kokhba revolt (132–136 CE)

Site notes
- Height: 240 m (790 ft)
- Area: 4 dunams
- Excavation dates: 2004–2005
- Archaeologists: Israel Finkelstein, Zvi Lederman, Yevgeni Aharonovich
- Condition: In ruins

Khirbet Abu ad-Danin, Horvat Abu a-Danin or Kh. Abu ed-Dinein is an archaeological site located in the central West Bank, just south of Modi'in Illit. The site represents a rural Jewish village from the late Second Temple period, founded in the 2nd century BCE and reaching its peak during the late Hellenistic and early Roman periods. The settlement appears to have been abandoned shortly after the Bar Kokhba revolt (132–136 CE), with only limited reoccupation during the Late Roman or Byzantine periods.

== Geography ==
Khirbet Abu ad-Danin, at about 240 metres (790 ft) above sea level, lies on the slope of a low hill in the northeastern Shephelah (Judean Foothills), overlooking the Modi'in Valley. The site is situated roughly 500 metres (1,600 ft) southwest of Khirbet Badd 'Isa, another Jewish village from the same period, and about 80 metres (260 ft) north of the Nahal Modi'in riverbed. The site covers an area of approximately 4 dunams.

== History ==
Archaeological evidence indicates that the settlement was founded in the 2nd century BCE, originally as a farmhouse. It reached its zenith between the first century BCE and the first century CE. No destruction layer from the First Jewish Revolt (66–73 CE) was identified, suggesting the site escaped direct conflict during that time. Instead, the site was abandoned several decades later, in the aftermath of the Bar Kokhba revolt (132–136 CE). A sparse re-occupation took place in the Late Roman or Byzantine period.

== Archaeology ==
Excavations at the site revealed several stone-built structures. Evidence from the village's center indicates careful urban planning. The central buildings were constructed of well-dressed masonry, most of them single-story structures.

=== Structures and installations ===
Building IIa, in the northeastern part of the site and separated from the village with an alley, contained multiple doorways and lacked privacy and multiple features associated with dwellings such as courtyards, ovens or cisterns. Its layout and construction indicate an administrative or communal purpose rather than domestic.

Building IV, located in the settlement's center, had a southern entrance flanked by elaborately carved limestone doorjambs decorated with egg-and-dart, bead-and-reel, spiral and rosette motifs. Inside the building, traces of arches and a staircase pointed to an upper story supported by stone vaults. The decorative blocks, reused as spolia, likely came from an earlier public building at the site in the Early Roman period, possibly dismantled during the First Jewish–Roman War. Given the existence of several public buildings discovered in the area, dating from the same period, identified as synagogues at Khirbet Badd 'Isa, Umm el-'Umdan, Horvat Diab, and Horvat 'Ethri—the spolia may derive from a public structure, perhaps a synagogue, that once stood in or near the village.

Around the central structures were large, open courtyards, that may have served as livestock pens or agricultural work areas. Along the southern slope stretched a system of subterranean installations, including cisterns and storage chambers. Several entrances appear to have been hastily blocked in antiquity, possibly during the Bar Kokhba revolt.

=== Finds ===
The ceramic finds consisted almost entirely of locally made pottery with minimal imported wares. Numerous chalk stone vessels, characteristic of Jewish purity practices, attest to the Jewish identity of the inhabitants. Twenty-nine coins were discovered at the site, most dating to the Hasmonean (10) and Early Roman (7) periods, with additional examples from the earlier Hellenistic era, the inter-revolt period, and the Late Roman and Byzantine periods.

== Research history ==
The site was surveyed in April 1982 as part of the Ephraim Survey. The surveyors reported "Remains of scattered buildings built of very large field stones, some of them preserved to 1.5 m (4 ft 11 in). It is possible that a major building stood in the centre of the site." Excavations led by Yevgeni Aharonovich of the Archaeology Unit of the Civil Administration of Judea and Samaria took place in 2004–2005.

== See also ==
- Modi'in (ancient city)
- Umm el-Umdan

== Bibliography ==
- Aharonovich, Yevgeny (2018). "חורבת אבו א–דנין, יישוב כפרי מסוף ימי הבית השני בשפלת לוד - Ḥorvat Abu a-Danin, a Rural Settlement of the Late Second Temple Period in the Lod Shephelah". Qadmoniot: A Journal for the Antiquities of Eretz-Israel and Bible Lands / קדמוניות: כתב-עת לעתיקות ארץ-ישראל וארצות המקרא (in Hebrew). נ"א (155): 37–41. ISSN 0033-4839. JSTOR 26749444.
- Finkelstein, Israel; Lederman, Zvi; Bunimovitz, Shlomo (1997). Highlands of Many Cultures: The Southern Samaria Survey—The Sites, Vol. 1. Monograph Series. Jerusalem: Institute of Archaeology, Tel Aviv University. pp. 338–339. ISBN 965-440-007-3.
