= Khirbet Badd 'Isa =

Archaeological site in the central West Bank

- Khirbet Bad-'Issa, Kiryat Sefer
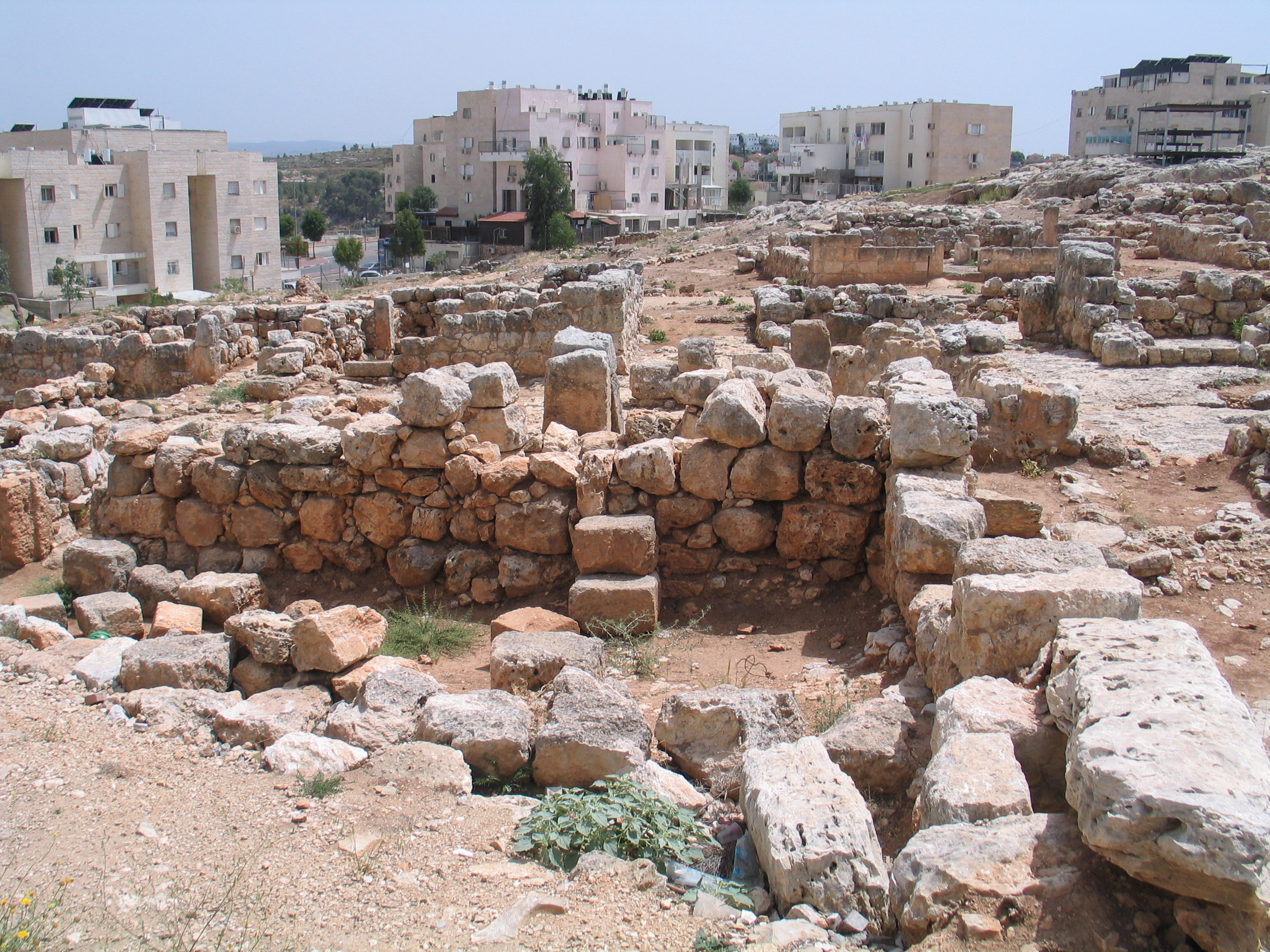
- Interactive map of Khirbet Badd 'Isa
- 31°55′35.8″N 35°02′32.7″E
- Type: village, synagogue
- Periods: Hellenistic, Hasmonean periods (Jewish agricultural settlement); Early and middle Roman periods (Jewish village); Late Roman, Byzantine periods (limited reoccupation); Bilad a-Sham (pastoral presence)
- Location: Modi'in Illit, West Bank
- Region: Shephelah
- New Israel Grid: 154/148

History
- Abandoned: First Jewish–Roman War, Bar Kokhba Revolt

Site notes
- Height: 301 metres (988 ft)
- Area: 4 dunams (0.4 ha)
- Archaeologists: Yitzhak Magen, Yoav Zionit, Erna Sirkis, Israel Finkelstein and Zvi Lederman
- Condition: In ruins

Khirbet Bad 'Issa or Khirbet Bad-'Issa is an archaeological site located in the central West Bank, within Modi'in Illit. Archaeological evidence suggests that the site was founded in the 3rd century BCE, during the Hellenistic period, as a seasonal agricultural settlement. It developed through the Hasmonean period into a permanent village in the first century CE. The settlement was depopulated during the First Jewish–Roman War (66–70 CE) and again following the Bar Kokhba Revolt (132–136 CE). It was resettled about a century later, in the 3rd century CE, but did not expand during the Byzantine period. In the early Islamic era, its spaces were reused by nomads and shepherds.

Excavations revealed a planned district containing six structures, including an ancient synagogue with a finely dressed ashlar façade, columns and arches, a large decorated lintel, and traces of wall frescoes. Other features include an olive press and an adjacent mikveh (Jewish ritual bath). Finds include abundant 1st–2nd-century CE ceramics (one bearing a Hebrew inscription), numerous stone vessels, and 365 coins spanning several centuries, 195 of which were discovered in two hoards.

== Geography ==
Khirbet Badd 'Isa, situated at about 301 metres (988 ft) above sea level, lies atop a low hill in the northeastern Shephelah (Judean Foothills), at the center of the Israeli settlement of Modi'in Illit. The site covers an area of approximately 4 dunams (0.4 ha).

The site is situated roughly 500 metres (1,600 ft) northeast of Khirbet Abu ad-Danin, another Jewish village from the late Second Temple period. In antiquity, a branch path from the Bethoron road, which connected Jerusalem with the coastal plain, passed nearby.

== History ==
Archaeological evidence indicates that the settlement was founded in the 3rd century BCE, when Judea was under Ptolemaic rule; initially it functioned as an agricultural site with temporary structures for guarding local produce. During the Hasmonean period—and perhaps already under the Seleucids—it operated as a seasonal agricultural hamlet centered on caves, rock-cut installations, and orchards of olives and grapevines. In the 1st century CE it developed into a permanent settlement, probably with royal Jewish patronage, possibly that of Herod Agrippa, who ruled Judaea as a client kingdom under Roman patronage in 41–44 CE. The site was abandoned during the First Jewish–Roman War, around the destruction of Jerusalem in 70 CE.

It was resettled in the inter-revolt period or as late as the Bar Kokhba Revolt (132–136 CE), but was depopulated again after the revolt's failure. A further resettlement occurred in the 3rd century CE; unlike some neighboring sites, it did not expand in the Byzantine period. In the early Islamic period, abandoned cisterns and caves at the site were reused by nomads and shepherds.

== Archaeology ==
At the summit of the hill, which was only partially excavated, a natural cave was found that appears to have been originally inhabited by farmers during the Hellenistic period. The cave also contained Medieval material from various Islamic periods. Nearby, archaeologists identified cisterns, agricultural installations, and remains of walls.

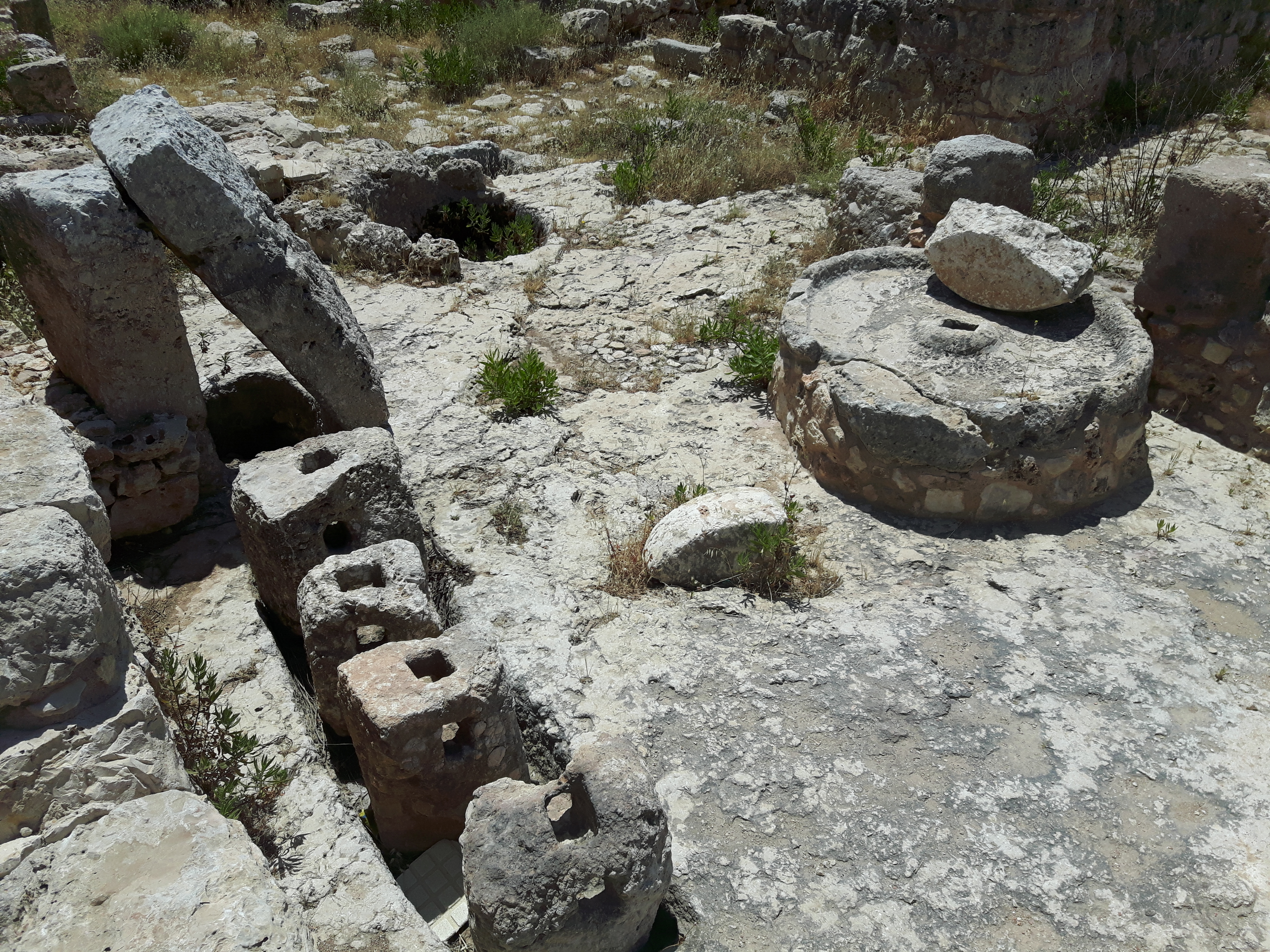
Remains of an olive oil press

In the northern sector of the site, excavations revealed a built-up area demonstrating organized urban planning. Six main structures were documented, including residential units, storage buildings, and a public structure. Their walls were built of fieldstone masonry, with doorposts and lintels of finely dressed ashlar; the structures also incorporated arches. One building contained an olive press, with various components used for crushing olives and filtering oil. Adjacent to it, archaeologists uncovered a mikveh (ritual bath), likely used by workers involved in oil production for ritual purification according to Jewish law.

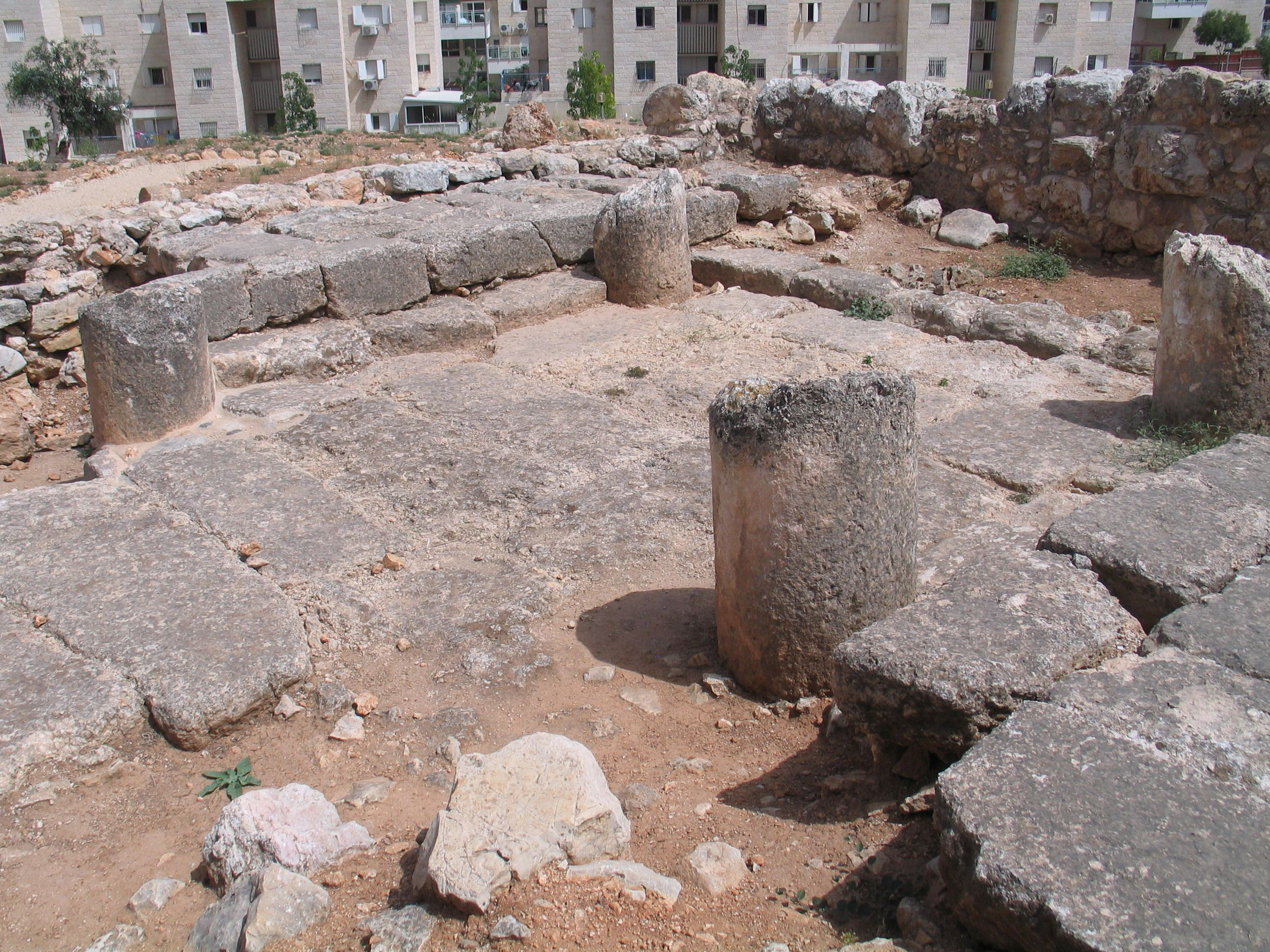
Remains of an ancient synagogue

The public building discovered in the northern section differs architecturally from the other structures and has been interpreted by excavators as an ancient synagogue, an interpretation that has since been widely accepted. Its façade was built of finely dressed ashlar stones, similar in workmanship to those of the Temple Mount in Jerusalem. A large, lintel bearing a central rosette set within a triangle was also uncovered. The structure featured columns and pilasters supporting arches and wooden beams, and traces of fresco plaster on the walls suggest that it was once decorated in a style typical of the period.

In the southern part of the site, remains of two buildings and arched, roofed cisterns were found. To the north and south, several rock-cut tombs characteristic of the Second Temple period were documented, along with a large winepress from the Late Roman period.

=== Finds ===
Most ceramics found at the site are from the first and second centuries CE. One sherd bears a Hebrew inscription, apparently the name Archelaus. In addition, a large quantity of stone vessels typical of Second Temple Judea was found.

A total of 365 coins were recovered at the site: The earliest are Ptolemaic and Seleucid coins; Hasmonean issues are represented by coins of John Hyrcanus, Alexander Jannaeus, and Antigonus II Mattathias. Early Roman coins include issues of Herod Philip and Agrippa I, four coins from Year 2 of the First Jewish Revolt (67/68 CE), and Roman issues of Vespasian, including pieces from the Iudaea Capta series. Numerous Bar Kokhba coins were found both in hoards and as stray finds. After a lull in activity following that revolt, minting represented on site resumes with coins from Philip the Arab (244–249 CE) and continues into the 4th century, with a smaller number of later Byzantine, early Islamic, and Ottoman specimens. Two hoards were discovered within two separate buildings. The first comprised 48 bronze coins ranging from the 1st century BCE to the Bar Kokhba period, apparently an indiscriminate accumulation of earlier and contemporary pieces. The second hoard contained 147 bronze coins, including issues of Herod, Agrippa, Vespasian, Trajan, and Hadrian; the latest pieces date to 128 CE.

== Research history ==
The site was surveyed in December 1982 as part of the Ephraim Survey. The surveyors reported "Remains of many buildings, some preserved to 1.5–2 m. Lintels, thresholds and door jambs. A cellar roofed with large stone slabs can be seen in one of the buildings. Several pillars with their bases are concentrated in one place – apparently a public building. An olive press to the north."

Excavations were eventually carried out in the 1990s on behalf of the Officer of Archaeology of the Judea and Samaria Administration, prompted by construction work for the establishment of Modi'in Illit (then known as Kiryat Sefer) and by longstanding archaeological looting at the site.

== See also ==
- Umm el-Umdan – nearby site also featuring a rural Second Temple period synagogue
- Horvat Diab – contemporaneous Jewish village; identification of a synagogue is debated

== Bibliography ==
- Aharonovich, Yevgeny (2018). "חורבת אבו א–דנין, יישוב כפרי מסוף ימי הבית השני בשפלת לוד - Ḥorvat Abu a-Danin, a Rural Settlement of the Late Second Temple Period in the Lod Shephelah". Qadmoniot: A Journal for the Antiquities of Eretz-Israel and Bible Lands / קדמוניות: כתב-עת לעתיקות ארץ-ישראל וארצות המקרא (in Hebrew). נ"א (155): 37–41. ISSN 0033-4839. JSTOR 26749444.
- Arubas, Benjamin; Leibner, Uzi (2024). "The Invisible Synagogues of the Second Temple Period". A Vision of the Days: Studies in Early Jewish History and Historiography: In Honor of Daniel R. Schwartz. Brill. pp. 502–548. ISBN 978-90-04-68554-3.
- Finkelstein, Israel; Lederman, Zvi; Bunimovitz, Shlomo (1997). Highlands of Many Cultures: The Southern Samaria Survey—The Sites, Vol. 1. Monograph Series. Jerusalem: Institute of Archaeology, Tel Aviv University. pp. 338–339. ISBN 965-440-007-3.
- Magen, Yitzhak; Zionit, Yoav; Sirkis, Erna (1999). "Kiryat Sefer - A Jewish Village and Synagogue of the Second Temple Period / קרית-ספר - עיירה יהודית ובית-כנסת מימי הבית השני". Qadmoniot: A Journal for the Antiquities of Eretz-Israel and Bible Lands / קדמוניות: כתב-עת לעתיקות ארץ-ישראל וארצות המקרא (in Hebrew). לב (1 (117)): 25–32. ISSN 0033-4839. JSTOR 23681828 – via JSTOR.
