= Mir yeshiva =

Mir Yeshiva or Mirrer Yeshiva may refer to:

- Mir Yeshiva (Belarus)
- Mir Yeshiva (Brooklyn)
- Mir Yeshiva (Jerusalem)
  - Mir Brachfeld, branch of Mir Yeshiva in Modi'in Illit
