= Aryeh Finkel =

Israeli rabbi (1931–2016)

Rabbi Aryeh Finkel אריה פינקל
- Rabbi Aryeh Finkel holding the Four Species at the Mir Yeshiva in Jerusalem

Personal life
- Born: Aryeh Finkel; July 28, 1931 Fieni, Dâmbovița County, Romania
- Died: August 9, 2016 (aged 85) Modi'in Illit, West Bank, Palestine
- Buried: Har Hamenuchos
- Children: Rabbi Binyomin Finkel
- Parent: Chaim Zev Finkel

Religious life
- Religion: Judaism
- Denomination: Haredi

Jewish leader
- Position: Rosh Yeshiva
- Yeshiva: Mir Brachfeld
- Began: 2005
- Ended: Aug. 9, 2016
- Other: Mashgiach, Mir Jerusalem
- Residence: Modi'in Illit, West Bank

Aryeh Finkel (Hebrew: אריה פינקל; 1931–2016) was an Israeli Haredi rabbi and rosh yeshiva of the Mir Brachfeld branch of the Mir Yeshiva. Before assuming his post at the new yeshiva branch in 2005, he served as the Mashgiach at the Mir in Jerusalem for many decades.

== Biography ==
Aryeh Finkel was the son of Rabbi Chaim Zev Finkel, founder of Yeshivas Heichal HaTorah in Tel Aviv and Mashgiach at the Mir in Jerusalem. He is the grandson of Rabbi Eliezer Yehuda Finkel, who led the yeshiva in Poland and brought it to Israel. He is a second cousin of Rabbi Nosson Tzvi Finkel, Rosh Yeshiva of the Mir from 1990 to 2011, and first cousin to the latter's wife. He is also Rabbi Avigdor Nebenzahl's brother-in-law. Finkel inherited his position as Mashgiach of the Mir from his father. He began serving in this position under Rabbi Chaim Leib Shmuelevitz.

He was the long-time Shaliach Tzibbur (cantor) for Rosh Hashana (Mussaf) and Yom Kippur (Kol Nidre, Maariv and Mussaf) at the Mir in Jerusalem.
