= Nosson Tzvi Finkel =

Nosson Tzvi Finkel may refer to one of the following roshei yeshiva in Orthodox Judaism:

- Nosson Tzvi Finkel (Slabodka) (1849–1927), of the Slabodka yeshiva in Kaunas, Lithuania, or his descendant,
- Nosson Tzvi Finkel (Mir) (1943–2011), of the Mirrer Yeshiva in Jerusalem, Israel
