= Deir Aziz synagogue =

Ancient synagogue in the southern Golan Heights

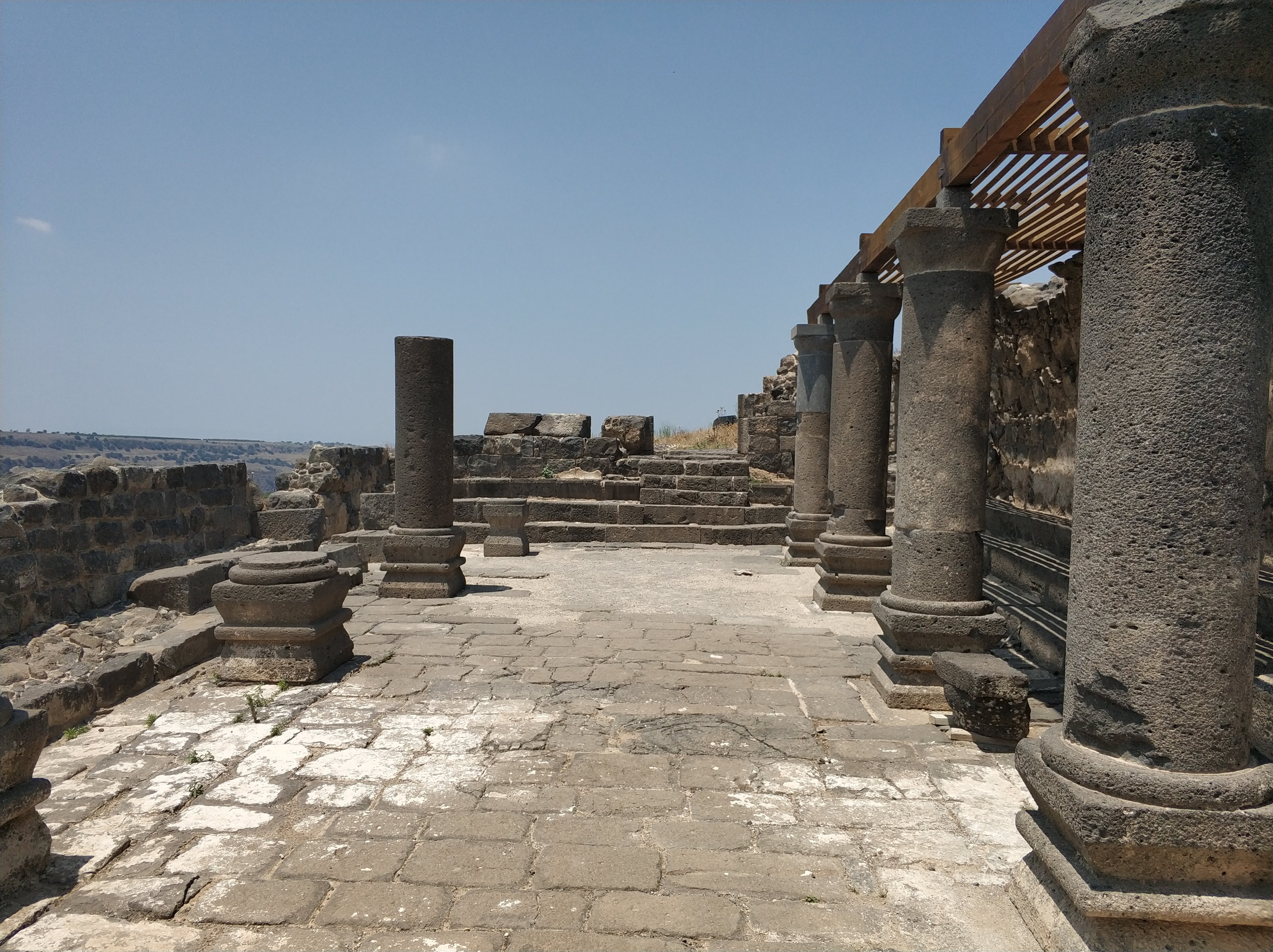
- The ancient former synagogue in 2018

- Location of the ancient former synagogue in the Golan Heights

Religion
- Affiliation: Judaism (former)
- Ecclesiastical or organizational status: Ancient synagogue; Archaeological site
- Status: Ruins

Location
- Location: Deir Aziz, Golan Heights
- Interactive map of Deir Aziz synagogue
- Coordinates: 32°51′51″N 35°42′46″E

Architecture
- Type: Basilica

The Deir Aziz synagogue is an ancient synagogue dating from the Mishnaic and Talmudic periods, located at the archeological site of Deir Aziz, in the southern Golan Heights.

== History ==
In the 1880s, Gottlieb Schumacher described it as " A small winter village, consisting of ten huts on the Wady Deir 'Aziz (Wady esh Shukeiyif). It belongs to the 'Arab ed-Diäb, but is not inhabited in summer".

The site included an ancient Jewish settlement. The remains of the synagogue, one of two public buildings found at the site, were initially uncovered by Lawrence Oliphant in the late 19th century. On 1967, the Syrian village was occupied by Israel during the 1967 Six-Day War. Following the Six-Day War, the site was archaeologically surveyed as part of an emergency survey of the Golan Heights.

In the 21st century, the synagogue underwent excavation and subsequent restoration efforts.

== Archeology ==
In 1998, an excavation expedition was organized on behalf of the Department of Land of Israel Studies and Archeology at Bar-Ilan University and Kinneret College led by Haim Ben David, Zvi Uri Maoz and Oren Zingboim. Excavations were carried out at the site until 2004. The excavations revealed a rectangular hall (basilica) measuring 11 by 18 m (36 by 59 ft), with a pile of ashlar stones, which may originate from the synagogue that was destroyed in the 749 CE earthquake. Under the floor of the hall, hundreds of coins were found, the latest of which date from the time of Justinian I, emperor of the Byzantine Empire (second quarter of the 6th century AD). In the southern wall of the hall there is a prominent niche for the Torah ark. Further more a Menorah and an Atarah (Hebrew word meaning "crown") were found engraved on a stone.

One of the synagogue's windows bears a Greek inscription, ΑΖΙΖΟ, suggesting a connection between the Arab name of the ruin, Deir Aziz, and the original name of the ancient Talmudic village.

== Gallery ==
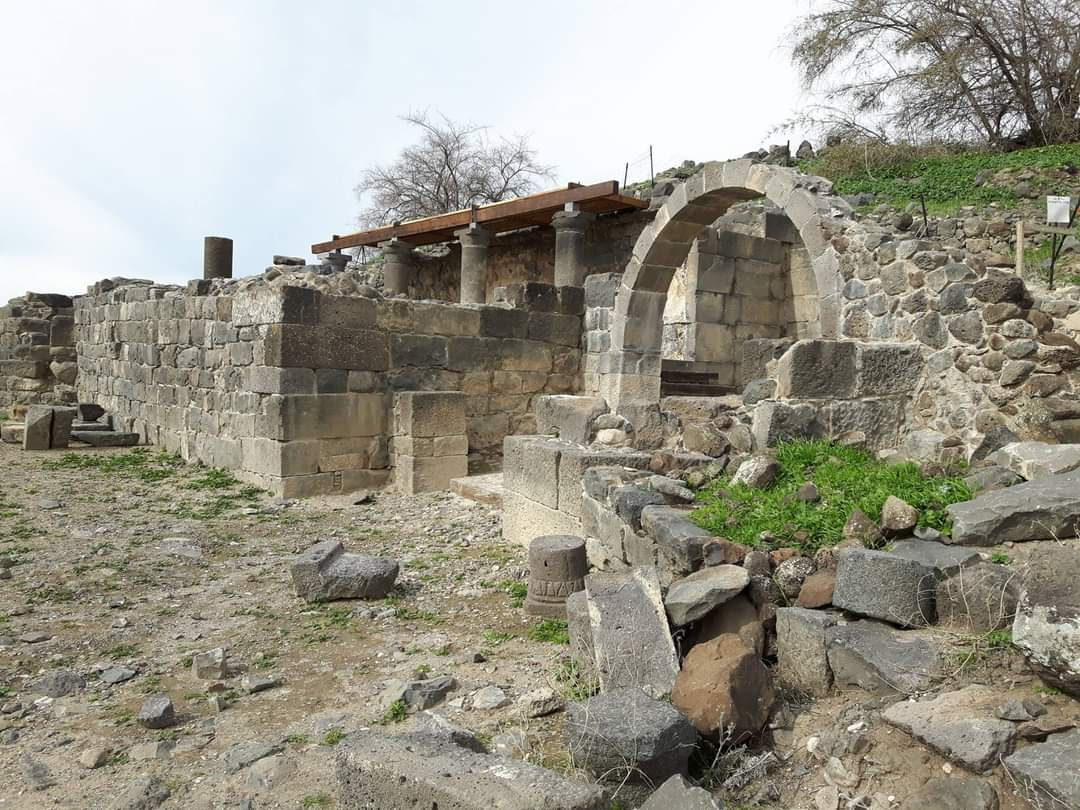
View of the synagogue

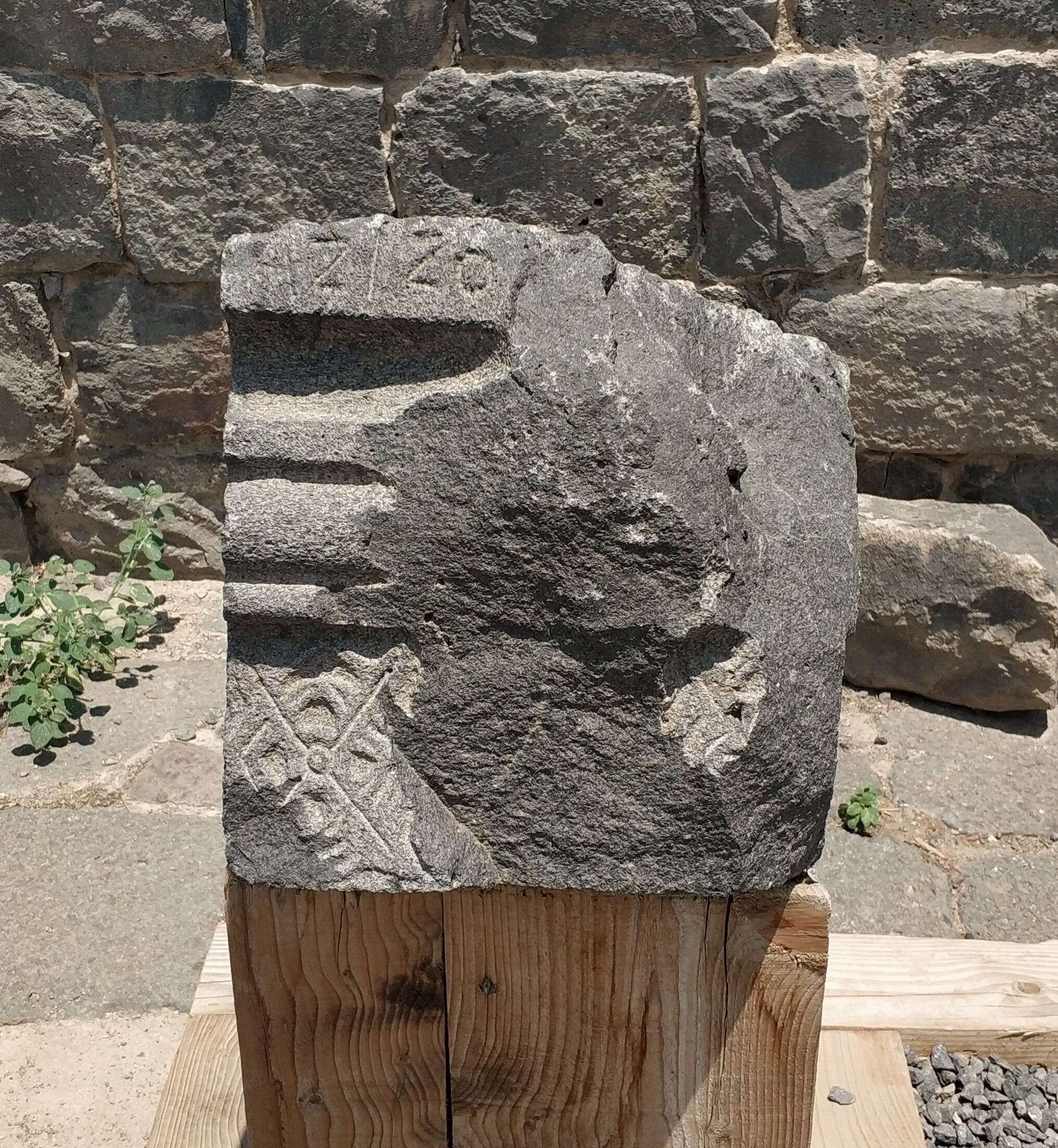
Greek inscription of the name: ΑΖΙΖΟ, possibly indicating "Aziz", related to the original name of the Talmudic settlement

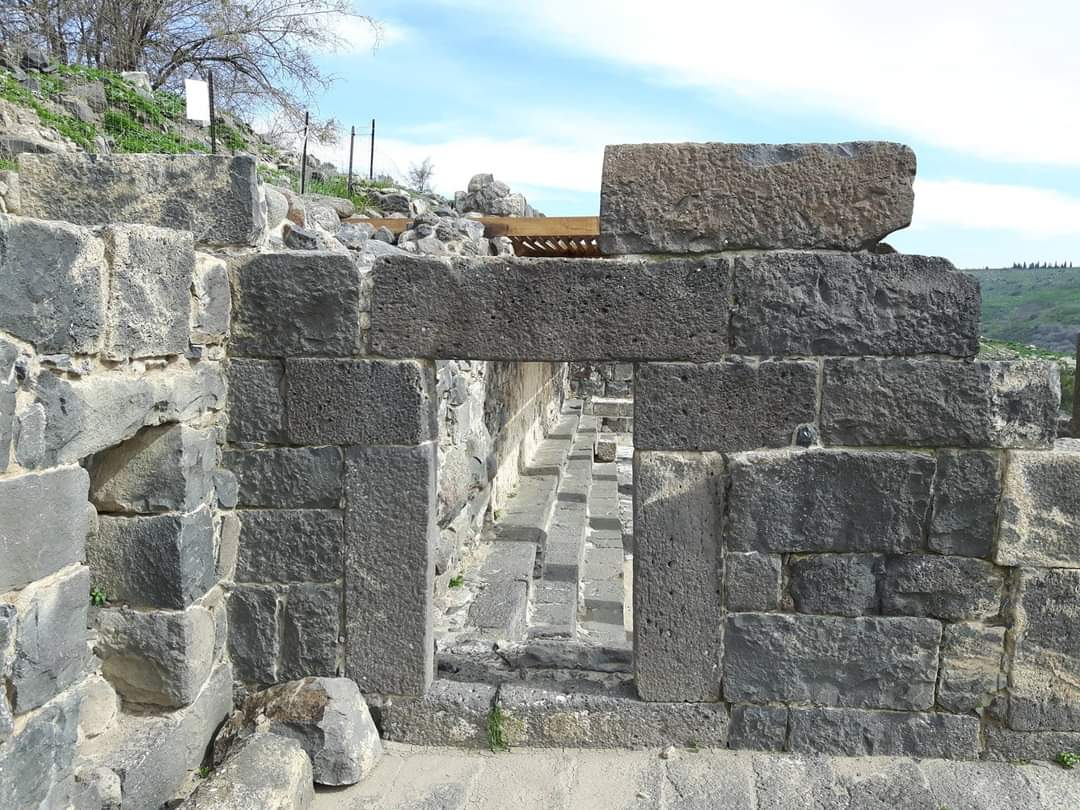
Niche for the Torah Ark in the synagogue

== See also ==
- History of the Jews in Syria
- List of synagogues in Syria
