= Eliezer Yehuda Finkel =

Eliezer Yehuda Finkel may refer to one of the two rosh yeshivas of the Mir yeshivas:

- Eliezer Yehuda Finkel (born 1879) (1879–1965), also known as Reb Leizer Yudel, rosh yeshiva of the Mir yeshiva in Poland and Jerusalem
- Eliezer Yehuda Finkel (born 1965), current rosh yeshiva of the Mir Yeshiva in Jerusalem
