= Ancient synagogues in Palestine =

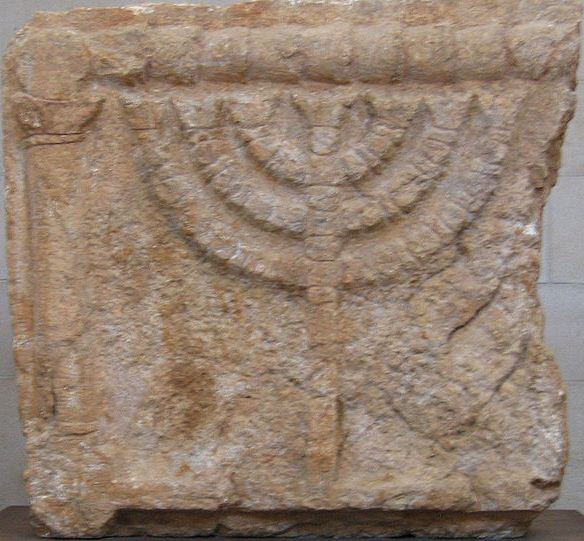
Capital depicting a Temple menorah from Eshtemoa synagogue, as-Samu, West Bank, Palestine dating from around the 4th–5th centuries

Ancient synagogues in the Land of Israel are synagogues and their remains in the Land of Israel/Palestine region (today's Israel, Palestinian, and the Syrian Golan Heights), built by the Jewish and Samaritan communities from the time of the Hasmonean dynasty during the late Hellenistic period to the late Byzantine period.

Numerous inscriptions have been found in the ancient synagogues of the Land of Israel; the vast majority of these, c. 140, are in Palestinian Jewish Aramaic, with another c. 50 in Koine or early Medieval Greek, and a few in Hebrew.

== History ==
Most of the synagogues unearthed in archaeological excavations in Israel, the West Bank and Gaza Strip and the Golan Heights date from the Roman and Byzantine periods, from the third to seventh centuries. Synagogues from before the destruction of the Second Temple in 70 CE include Gamla, Masada and Herodium. After the destruction of the Temple in Jerusalem, the local synagogue became its substitute and from Late Antiquity onward, the number of synagogues discovered rise significantly, with over one hundred being unearthed in Palestine alone. More than fifty of these are situated in Galilee and on the Golan Heights.

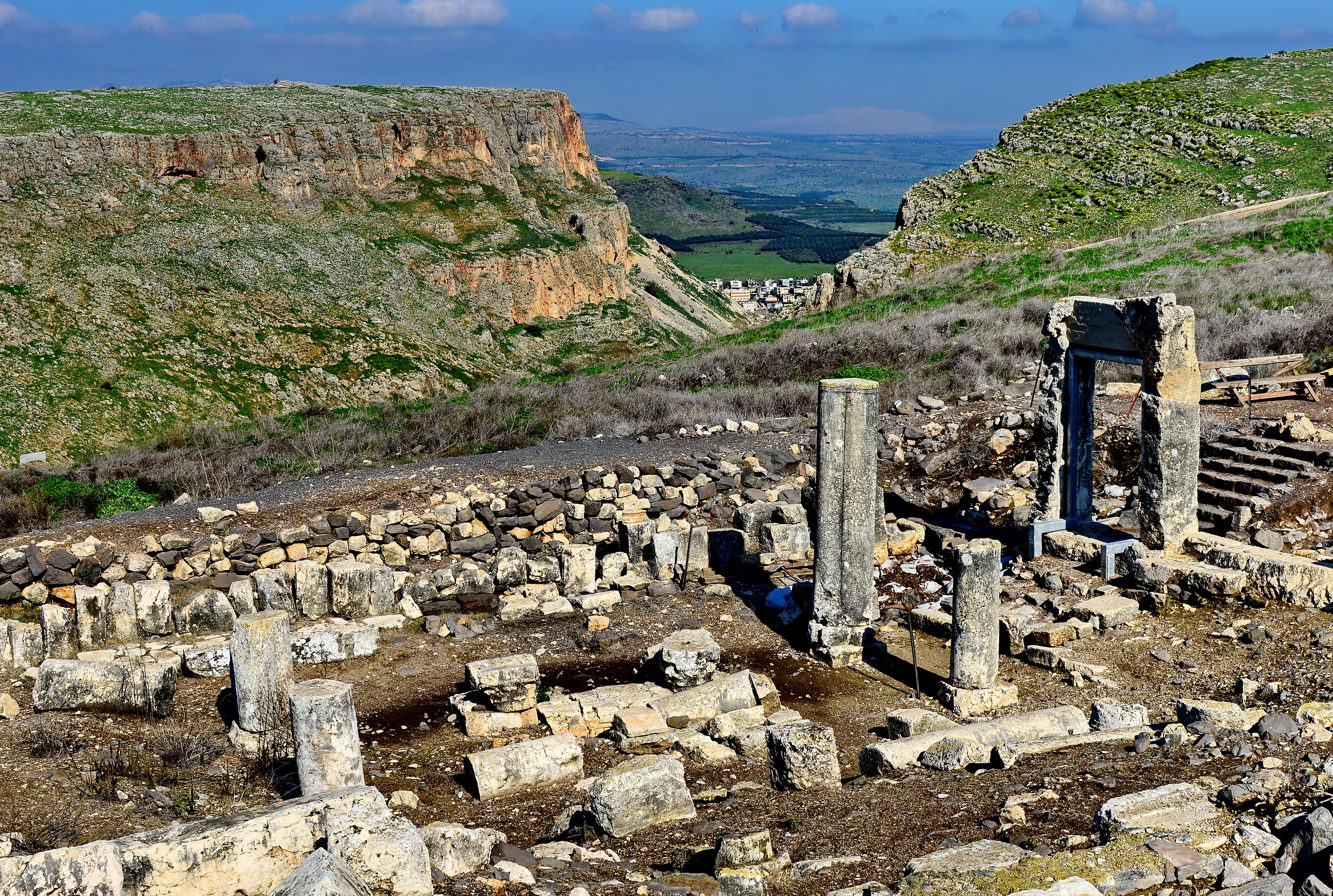
Arbel Synagogue, dating from the 4th century CE

A survey conducted in the 1970s found that of the known synagogue inscriptions, 67 were in Greek and found in the coastal and major inland cities. Another 54 were in Aramaic, and 14 in Hebrew. The vast majority of inscriptions are dedicatory, while the remainder feature literary sources or are short labels for images. Decorations used on mosaic floors, capitals and lintels were symbolic of the Temple service and included the menorah, lulav and etrog. Lions were depicted to represent the power of God. Aside from remains found in-situ, architectural elements of the synagogues are often found to have been reused in the houses of adjacent villages. Sometimes dressed stones were transferred further afield and lintels from the doorways of ancient Palestinian synagogues are also to be found in contemporary homes in Syria.

The earliest synagogue inscription uncovered to date is the Theodotus inscription; it is in Greek and dates to the first century BCE or the first century CE. It was discovered in the City of David, just south of the Temple Mount in Jerusalem.

All of the early synagogues were purpose-built and many synagogues dating to the talmudic era onwards had annexes attached to the main structure, indicating that synagogues additionally functioned as a communal centres.

Some modern-day synagogue architects have relied upon synagogue architecture in ancient Judea in an attempt to create an "identifiably Jewish style" of synagogue design. The Henry S. Frank Memorial Synagogue in Philadelphia was inspired by the remains of the synagogue at Kfar Bar'am.

== Second Temple period synagogues ==
Synagogues had a different function prior to the Second Temple's destruction in 70 CE than they did afterwards. Several examples of such early synagogues from the time and territory of the Hasmonean and Herodian dynasties until 70 CE have been excavated in Israel, the West Bank, and one on the Golan Heights. A significant portion of the scientific community agrees that some of these are synagogues, while some are debated. They all share only a certain number of architectural characteristics with the better-accepted post-destruction synagogues.

Here is a list of all the structures from the Palestine region discovered as of July 2018 and interpreted by some as Second Temple period synagogues. The list includes following data:

Location – Built; in use until – Discovered by – Comments/reservations

=== Widely accepted ===
==== Golan Heights ====
On the Golan Heights:

- Gamla – 1st century BCE (Herodian) – contested

==== Galilee ====
In Galilee:

- Capernaum, the basalt structure underneath the later "white synagogue" – 1st century CE – not excavated, contested
- Migdal Synagogue (Magdala) – between 50 BCE – 100 CE – discovered 2009; another synagogue from the same period was discovered at Magdala in 2021.
- Khirbet Wadi Hamam (Nahal Arbel) – 1st half of the 1st century CE – excavated 2007–2012; near Hamaam, Israel
- Tel Rekhesh/Tell el-Mukharkhash in Tabor Valley – destroyed in Bar Kochba revolt (?) – "first rural synagogue" of the period discovered as of 2016; at a Jewish farmstead from the Second Temple Period, 8 km SE of Mount Tabor

==== Judaean hills and desert ====
In the Judaean hills and desert:

- Jerusalem, City of David/Silwan – 1st century BCE or 1st century CE – "Theodotus synagogue", based only on the Theodotos Inscription mentioning a synagogue and a hostel
- Herodium – contested; inside Herodian triclinium; theories: built either by Zealots, First Jewish Revolt, or during Bar Kokhba Revolt
- Horvat Diab
- Masada – contested; Sicarii (1st century CE), including a genizah

==== Shephelah ====
In the Shephelah (Judaean foothills):

- Umm el-Umdan at Modi'in-Maccabim-Re'ut – end 2nd–beginning 1st century BCE (Hasmonean); until 132 CE – 1st century CE mikveh next to it
- Khirbet Badd 'Isa at Modi'in Illit (aka Qiryat Sefer) – 1st century BCE – less published than Umm el-Umdan (Modi'in) site; near modern Modi'in, Ascent of Beth-Horon
- Horvat 'Ethri / Umm Sweyd

=== Also suggested ===
- Wadi Qelt Synagogue at Tulul Abu el-Alayiq, Jericho – 70–50 BCE (Hasmonean); destroyed by earthquake- Ehud Netzer – strongly contested
- Chorazin – described in detail in 1926 by Jacob Ory, who found it 200 metres west of 3rd-century CE synagogue; exact location not rediscovered until now
- Qumran, where the two gathering rooms might be defined as a synagogue – around 100 BCE (?) – highly contested; if indeed a synagogue: of a sectarian type
- Shu'afat near Jerusalem – structure excavated in 1991 by the late Alexander Onn, who dated it to early 1st century-31 BCE; insufficiently published, some claim the "case evaporated" and the "claim should be withdrawn"

=== Chronological list ===
The same sites listed in a tentatively chronological order according to the excavators' estimate of the time of construction.

- Modi'in (end 2nd-beginning 1st century BCE)
- Wadi Qelt Synagogue (50–70 BCE)
- Gamla (1st century BCE)
- Modi'in Illit (1st century BCE)
- Wadi Hamam (Nahal Arbel) (1st half of the 1st century CE)
- City of David "Theodotus synagogue" (1st century CE)
- Migdal Synagogue (between 50 BCE – 100 CE)
- Masada (1st century BCE)
- Herodium (1st century CE)
- Capernaum (1st century CE)
- Tel Rekhesh (1st century CE)

Very controversial:

- Chorazin (1st century CE – ?)
- Qumran (?)
- Shu'afat (early 1st century/31 BCE – ?)

== Ancient synagogue sites ==
New locations are being added here, without pretending to maintain a fully updated list.

A

- Anim
- Arbel
- Ashkelon
- Assaliyye

B

- Bar'am
- Beit Alfa
- Beit Guvrin
- Beit Shean
- Beit She'arim (Roman-era Jewish village)
- Belvoir

C

- Capernaum – the best preserved synagogue.
- Caphra
- Chorazin

D

- Dabura
- Dabiyye
- Danna

E

- Ed-Dikke, Khirbet
- Ein Gedi
- Ein ha-Naziv
- Eshtemoa

G

- Gaza
- Gamla – oldest identified synagogue in Palestine and largest estimated seating capacity.
- Gush Halav

H

- Hammat Tiberias
- Hamat Gader
- Herodium
- Horvat Ammudim/Umm el-'Amed
- Horvat Diab
- Horvat 'Ethri/Hurvat Itri
- Horvat Kishor, Southern Hebron Hills
- Horvat Sumaqa
- Huqoq
- Huseifa

J

- Japhia/Japha
- Jericho, Jericho synagogue
- Jericho, Tulul Abu el-Alayiq site in Wadi Qelt: so-called Wadi Qelt Synagogue
- Jerusalem, City of David: the Theodotos Inscription (1st century BCE or 1st century CE) mentions a synagogue and a hostel

K

- Kanaf
- Kefar Fahma
- Kafr Kanna
- Khirbet Badd 'Isa
- Khirbet Rib
- Khirbet Shema
- Khirbet Wadi Hamam

M

- Maon/Ma'on in the South Hebron Hills
- Maon/Ma'on in the western Negev
- Maoz Chaim
- Masada
- Meroth
- Migdal
- Meron
- Modi'in: Umm el-Umdan site
- Modi'in Illit/Qiryat Sefer: Khirbet Badd 'Isa site

N

- Naaran
- Nabratein

P

- Peki'in

Q

- Qision
- Qiyuma
- Qumran-the gathering hall might be defined as a synagogue

R

- Ramah
- Rehob
- Rimmon

S

- Sasa
- Sifsula
- Shura, Khirbet
- Susya

T

- Tel Rekhesh
- Tirat Zvi
- Tzippori

U

- Umm el-Qanatir
- Umm el-Umdan (also under Modi'in)

W

- Wadi Hamam (Khirbet Wadi Hamam/Kh. el-Wereidat/H. Vradim)

Y

- Yafa: see Japhia
- Yesud HaMa'ala
- Yodefat

Z

- Zumeimira

== See also ==
- Ancient synagogues in Israel, dealing only with synagogues in Israel
- Archaeology of Israel
- Daroma, ancient region with own synagogue type
- List of oldest synagogues in the world
- Synagogue of the Libertines mentioned in Acts of the Apostles
- Zodiac mosaics in ancient synagogues

Modern synagogues inspired by ancient ones

- Or Torah Synagogue, Akko, Israel: dome with zodiac mosaic copied after ancient one at Beth Alfa
- Young Israel Beth El of Borough Park, architecture

== Bibliography ==
- Lester L. Grabbe. Synagogues in Pre-70 Palestine: A Re- Assessment, JTS 39 (1988).
- S. Krauss. Nouvelles decouvertes archeologiques de synagogues en Palestine, REJ 89 (1930).
- LI Levine. The Nature and Origins of Palestinian Synagogues, JBL 115 (1996).
- Jodi Magness. Heaven on Earth: Helios and the Zodiac Cycle in Ancient Palestinian Synagogues, Dumbarton Oaks Papers, Vol. 59, (2005), pp. 1–52.
- EL Sukenik. Ancient Synagogues of Palestine and Greece, (London, 1934).
- Dan Urman, Paul Virgil McCracken Flesher. Ancient synagogues: historical analysis and archaeological discovery, BRILL, 1998.
