= Horvat Diab =

Archaeological site in the West Bank

- Horbat Diab
- Interactive map of Horvat Diab
- 31°50′31″N 35°09′24″E
- Type: estate farm, synagogue (contested)
- Periods: Hellenistic (Hasmonean), Roman periods
- Cultures: Second Temple Judaism
- Location: West Bank
- Region: Judaean Mountains

History
- Built: 2nd century BCE
- Abandoned: First Jewish–Roman War

Site notes
- Excavation dates: 2005
- Archaeologists: Benjamin Har-Even
- Condition: In ruins

Ḥorvat Diab or Horbat Diab is an archaeological site located in the central West Bank, near Biddu, Giv'on HaHadasha, and Beit Ijza. Excavations uncovered the remains of a substantial Jewish estate farm that was occupied from the late 2nd century BCE until the First Jewish Revolt against Rome, after which it was abandoned.

The complex included a hall with stone benches and a nearby mikveh (Jewish ritual bath). Based on its layout and parallels from other synagogues of the late Second Temple period, the excavator, Benjamin Har-Even, identified the structure as a simple synagogue serving the estate's inhabitants. If this interpretation is correct, it would place the site among the earliest known synagogues in the southern Levant. A cemetery from the Second Temple period, featuring rock-cut tombs typical of that era, lies on the northern and eastern slopes.

== Geography ==
The site is situated atop a hill at an elevation of c. 750 m above sea level, on a plateau overlooking Wadi Salman (Nahal Ayalon). The ancient road between Jaffa and Jerusalem, which climbed the Bethoron ascent, passed nearby. In modern times, the site lies in the West Bank, not far from Jerusalem, in the vicinity of Biddu, Giv'on HaHadasha, and Beit Ijza.

== Archaeology ==
The site appears to have been a large estate farm belonging to an extended Jewish family in the late Second Temple period. Numismatic evidence indicates that the settlement was inhabited from the late 2nd century BCE until the First Jewish Revolt against Rome, after which it was abandoned.

=== Synagogue ===
Excavations exposed a residential complex covering about 4 dunams. One room is a transverse hall, measuring 7.5 × 3.5 m, detached from the other rooms of the wing and constitutes a separate unit. Benches of dressed ashlar were installed on either side of its entrance and along parts of the walls; the stones preserve chisel marks characteristic of Second Temple–period masonry. A mikveh was excavated nearby.

Based on the hall’s architectural layout, its benches, the presence of a nearby mikveh, and its resemblance to early synagogues discovered at Masada, Herodium, Gamla, Kiryat Sefer, Modi'in, and Magdala, the site's excavator Benjamin Har-Even suggested that this hall functioned as a synagogue (though simpler in design and lacking columns), serving the inhabitants of the estate. This identification has been adopted by several scholars, including Rina Talgam, Dina Avshalom-Gorni, and Arfan Najar. Not all agree, however: Ze'ev Weiss questions the synagogue interpretation, arguing that the small, bench-lined hall is better understood as a family or guest-reception space rather than a prayer hall.

=== Cemetery ===
The cemetery serving the settlement lies on the northern and eastern slopes. It includes rock-hewn tombs characteristic of the Second Temple period.

=== Finds ===
Numerous tools were found on site, some made of basalt, along with characteristic stone vessels and a few coins dating from the Hasmonean and Herodian kingdoms, and the first century CE, the latest from the second year of the First Jewish Revolt (67/68 CE).

== Research History ==
The first archaeological survey at the site took place in 1968 as part of the Emergency Survey, when the site was identified as a Roman-period (late Second Temple era) cemetery. A subsequent survey within the "Land of Benjamin Survey" documented remains of an ancient ruin as well.

In 2005, a salvage excavation was carried out by Benjamin Har-Even on behalf of the Staff Officer for Archaeology in the Civil Administration of Judea and Samaria, in conjunction with construction of the West Bank barrier. The work, focused on the site's western slopes, exposed architectural remains, including a residential complex and a public building.

== See also ==
- Ancient synagogues in Palestine
- Bir ed-Duwali
- Khirbet al-Biyar
- Khirbet Badd 'Isa
- Umm el-Umdan

== Bibliography ==
- Har-Even, Benyamin (2016). "בית כנסת מימי בית שני בחורבת דיאב שבמערב בנימין - A Second Temple Period Synagogue at Ḥorvat Diab in Western Benjamin". Qadmoniot: A Journal for the Antiquities of Eretz-Israel and Bible Lands / קדמוניות: כתב-עת לעתיקות ארץ-ישראל וארצות המקרא (in Hebrew). מ"ט (151): 49–53. ISSN 0033-4839.
- Talgam, Rina; Avshalom-Gorni, Dina; Najar, Arfan (2024). "The Magdala Synagogue in Reference to Other Synagogues of the Second Temple Period in Iudaea: Functional, Archaeological, Chronological, and Architectural Aspects". From the Magdala Stone to the Syriac Bema. Supplements to the Journal for the Study of Judaism. Vol. 218. 96–112: Brill. pp. 69–112. ISBN 978-90-04-70772-6.
- Weiss, Ze'ev (2020). "The Synagogue in the Age of Transition, from the Second Temple Period to Roman Times: Recent Developments in Research". In Doering, Lutz; Krause, Andrew R. (eds.). Synagogues in the Hellenistic and Roman Periods; Archaeological Finds, New Methods, New Theories. Ioudaioi: Schriften des Institutum Judaicum Delitzschianum. Vol. 11. Gottingen: Vandenhoeck & Ruprecht Verlage. pp. 25–41. ISBN 978-3-666-52215-4.
