= Mir Brachfeld =

Haredi yeshiva in Israel

Yeshivas Mir Brachfeld
- ישיבת מיר ברכפלד
- Other names: Mir Yeshiva
- Established: 2006
- Founders: Rabbi Nosson Tzvi Finkel (Mir)
- Religious affiliation: Orthodox Judaism
- Rosh yeshiva: Rabbi Noam Alon
- Location: Modi'in Illit, 31°56′27.5″N 35°02′35.02″E

Mir Brachfeld is an Haredi Jewish yeshiva in the Israeli settlement of Modi'in Illit. It was founded by Rabbi Nosson Tzvi Finkel as a branch of the Mir Yeshiva in Jerusalem. Rabbi Aryeh Finkel led the yeshiva until his death in 2016.

== History ==
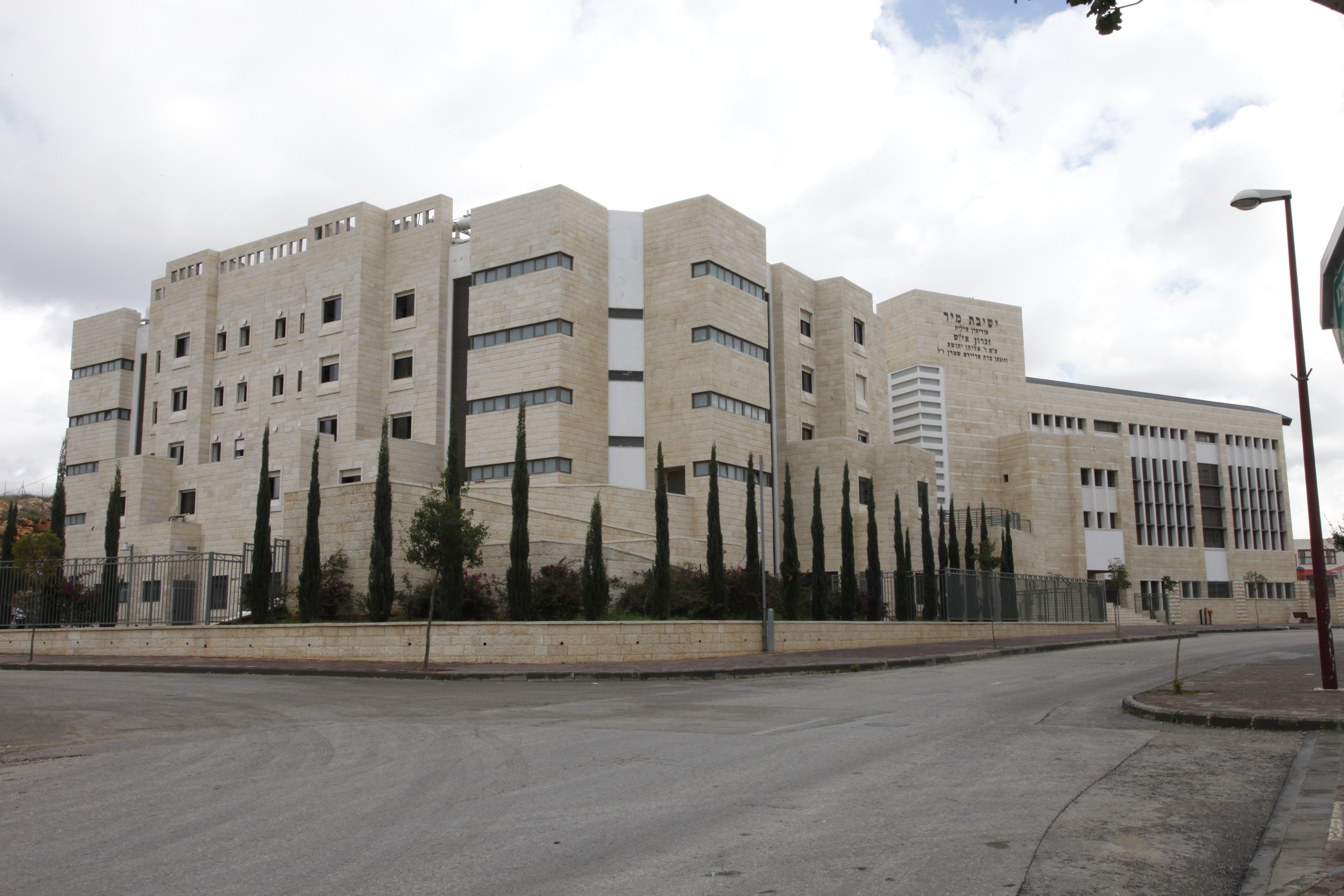
Exterior of the yeshiva

In 2000, Rabbi Nosson Tzvi Finkel, the rosh yeshiva of the Mir Yeshiva in Jerusalem, founded a branch of his yeshiva in the Brachfeld neighborhood of Modi'in Illit. Rabbi Aryeh Finkel, a grandson of Mir rosh yeshiva Rabbi Eliezer Yehuda Finkel, who had been giving a shiur in Mir Yerushalayim until then, was appointed rosh yeshiva. Rabbi Nosson Tzvi remained involved to the yeshiva over the years, sometimes coming for Shabbos, among other things.

Rabbi Aryeh Finkel's died in 2016. Rabbi Noam Alon, son-in-law of Rabbi Nosson Tzvi Finkel (Mir), serves as a rosh yeshiva.
