= Eliezer Yehuda Finkel (born 1965) =

Rabbi Eliezer Yehuda Finkel אליעזר יהודה פינקל
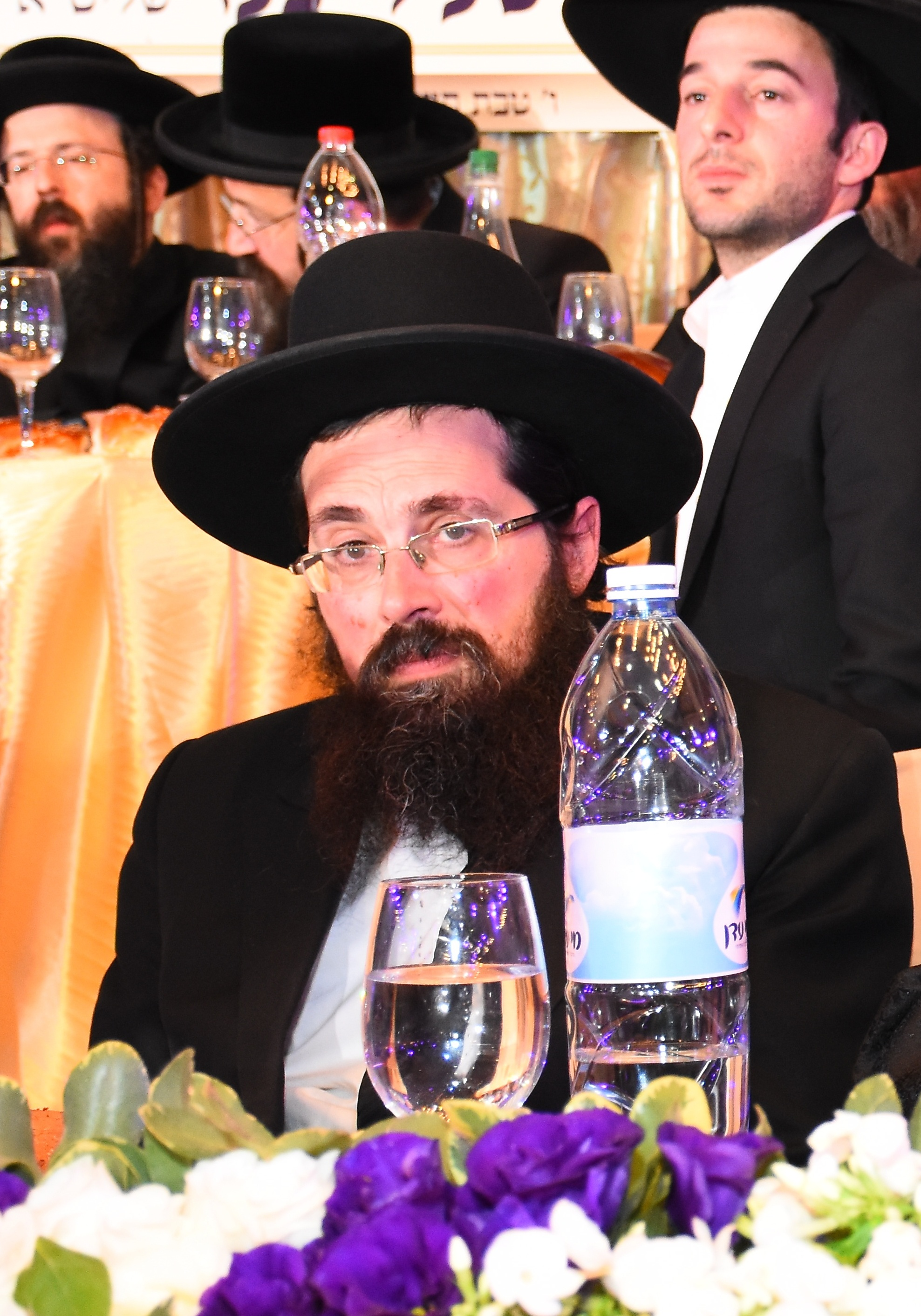
- Rav Eliezer Yehuda Finkel (December 2015)
- Title: Rosh Yeshivas Mir

Personal life
- Born: Eliezer Yehuda Finkel; September 16, 1965 (age 61)
- Parent(s): Rabbi Nosson Tzvi Finkel; Rachel Leah Finkel

Religious life
- Religion: Judaism
- Denomination: Haredi

Jewish leader
- Predecessor: Rabbi Nosson Tzvi Finkel
- Synagogue: Mir Yeshiva Jerusalem
- Yeshiva: Mir yeshiva (Jerusalem)
- Organisation: Mir Yeshiva Jerusalem
- Began: 2011
- Residence: Jerusalem, Israel

Rav Eliezer Yehuda Finkel (also called Leizer Yudel Finkel) is a Haredi Jewish rosh yeshiva (dean) of the Mir Yeshiva in Jerusalem, which is considered to be the largest yeshiva in Israel with a student body of 9,500 students.

He acceded to the position of rosh yeshiva after his father, Rabbi Nosson Tzvi Finkel, died suddenly on 8 November 2011.

== Biography ==
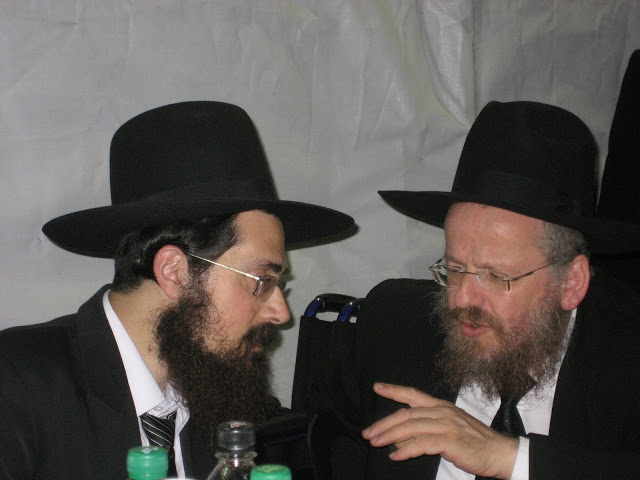
Finkel (left) and Rabbi Refoel Partzovitz

Finkel was named after his maternal great-grandfather, Rabbi Eliezer Yehuda Finkel, who became rosh yeshiva (dean) of the Mir yeshiva in Poland in 1917 and re-established the yeshiva in Jerusalem during World War II while the main body of the yeshiva was in exile in the Far East. His great-great-grandfather was the Mussar movement leader Nosson Tzvi Finkel.
