= Nosson Tzvi Finkel (Mir) =

Dean of the Mir Yeshiva in Jerusalem (1943–2011)

Rabbi Nosson Tzvi Finkel נתן צבי פינקל
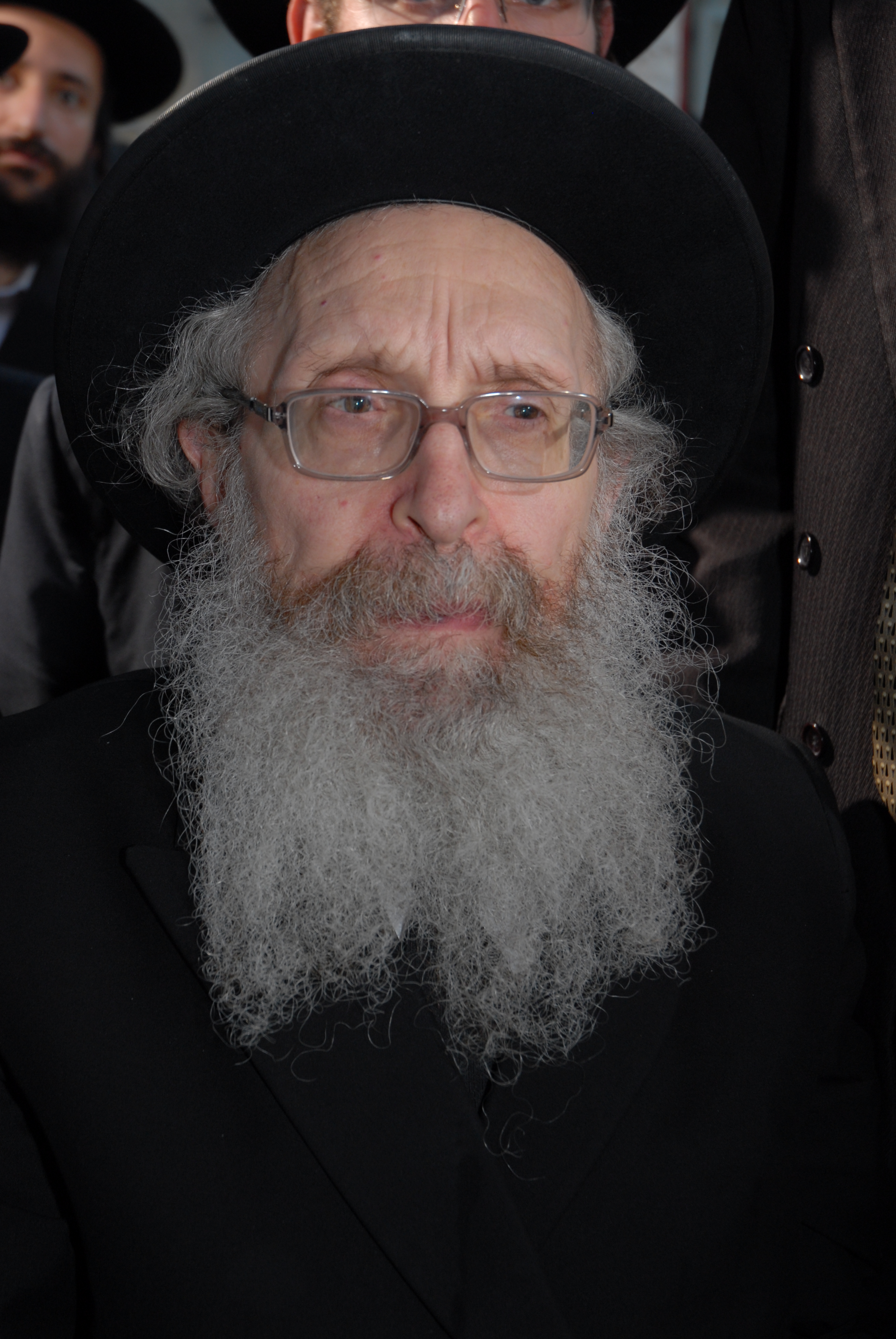
- Title: Rosh Yeshivas Mir

Personal life
- Born: Nosson Tzvi Finkel; 12 March 1943 Chicago, Illinois
- Died: 8 November 2011 (aged 68) Jerusalem, Israel
- Buried: 8 November 2011
- Spouse: Leah Finkel
- Children: Eliezer Yehuda; Avraham Shmuel; Yeshayahu; Yitzchak; Shmaryahu Yosef; Chaim Yehoshua Tanchum; 6 daughters
- Parent(s): Eliyahu Meir Finkel; Sara Rosenblum

Religious life
- Religion: Judaism
- Denomination: Haredi

Jewish leader
- Predecessor: Rabbi Chaim Leib Shmuelevitz, Rabbi Nachum Partzovitz
- Successor: Rabbi Eliezer Yehuda Finkel
- Yeshiva: Mir yeshiva (Jerusalem)
- Position: Rosh yeshiva
- Began: 13 February 1990
- Ended: 8 November 2011
- Residence: Jerusalem, Israel

Nosson Tzvi Finkel (Hebrew: נתן צבי פינקל; 12 March 1943 – 8 November 2011) was an American-born Haredi Litvish rabbi and rosh yeshiva (dean) of the Mir Yeshiva in Jerusalem. During his tenure from 1990 until his death in 2011, the Mir Yeshiva grew into the largest yeshiva in Israel with nearly 6,000 undergraduate students and over 1,600 avreichim (married students). According to one estimate, he taught 25,000 students over his lifetime. He continued to work during the last 28 years of his life, when he had Parkinson's disease, experiencing involuntary spasms and slurred speech. He raised an estimated US$500 million for the Mir during his tenure as rosh yeshiva. He was a member of the Moetzes Gedolei HaTorah of Degel HaTorah. He was known for his Torah erudition and his warmth and concern for his students.

== Early life ==
Finkel was born in Chicago, Illinois, to Rabbi Eliyahu Meir Finkel and his wife, Sara Rosenblum, who ran a kosher catering business. His paternal grandfather, Rabbi Avraham Shmuel Finkel, was a mashgiach ruchani at the Hebron yeshiva in Israel, and his paternal great-grandfather was the Alter of Slabodka, Rabbi Nosson Tzvi Finkel, after whom he was named. He had one brother, Gedaliah, who now teaches at the Mir yeshiva. After his parents immigrated to Israel in 1973, his mother published a best-selling kosher cookbook.

Finkel grew up as a "typical American Jewish boy" who enjoyed playing basketball and baseball. He was known as Nathan in school and Natie to his friends. He was one of the first students of the Central Park Hebrew Day School (later renamed Arie Crown Day School) and received after-school tutoring in Torah studies from Rabbi Yehoshua Levinson. In 1957, at the age of 14, he accompanied his parents on a trip to Israel to visit the holy sites and his father's family. His great-uncle, Rabbi Eliezer Yehuda Finkel ("Reb Leizer Yudel"), the Mir rosh yeshiva, recognized his ability to think clearly and have patience for studying, and asked his parents to let him stay and study in his yeshiva. Finkel remained at the Mir for eight months, studying with top-notch chavrutas (study partners) to develop his skills. He returned to Chicago to take his secondary education at the co-ed, Modern Orthodox Ida Crown Jewish Academy, where he was president of the student council and a starting centerfielder for the baseball team. At the age of 17, Finkel returned to Jerusalem to learn at the Mir under the guidance of his great-uncle. He learned diligently for the next six years. With one of his chavrutas, Rabbi Zundel Kroizer, he completed the entire Talmud each year.

In the summer of 1964 Finkel married Reb Leizer Yudel's granddaughter, Leah, his second cousin and the eldest daughter of Rabbi Binyomin Beinush Finkel, who was his father's first cousin. He and his wife had 11 children. He continued to learn with chavrutas at all hours, stopping at 2 a.m.; his wife would bring their children to visit him at the yeshiva so he wouldn't have to take the time to walk home. He also began delivering shiurim in the yeshiva, which was headed by his father-in-law after the death of Reb Leizer Yudel in 1965. Upon the death of his father-in-law on 13 February 1990, Finkel was named rosh yeshiva of the Mir together with Rabbi Refoel Shmuelevitz (son of former Mir rosh yeshiva Rabbi Chaim Leib Shmuelevitz). Finkel took on the financial responsibility for the yeshiva.

== Growth of the Mir ==
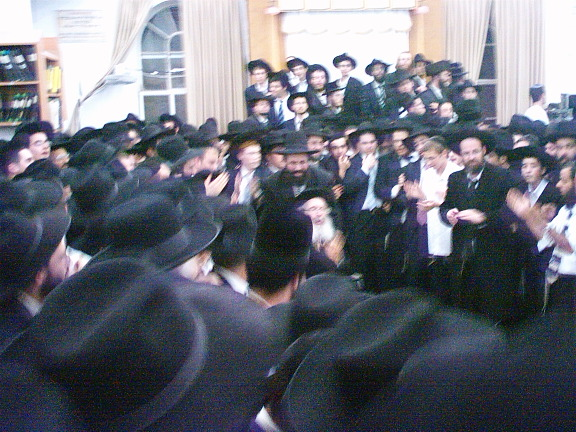
Rabbi Nosson Tzvi Finkel (center, in wheelchair) participates in a Simchat Beit HaShoeivah at the Mir in 2006.

When Finkel first came to the Mir at the age of 17 in 1960, enrollment was less than 200 students, of which 75 percent were avreichim (married students) and 25 percent were undergraduates. When he became rosh yeshiva in 1990, enrollment stood at approximately 1,200 students. At the time of his death, enrollment reached nearly 6,000 undergraduates and over 1,600 avreichim. This growth is credited to Finkel's open-door policy as rosh yeshiva: whoever wished to learn at the Mir was welcome. Enrollment now includes Litvish, Hasidic, Ashkenazi, Sephardi and baalei teshuva students from Israel, the United States and Europe.

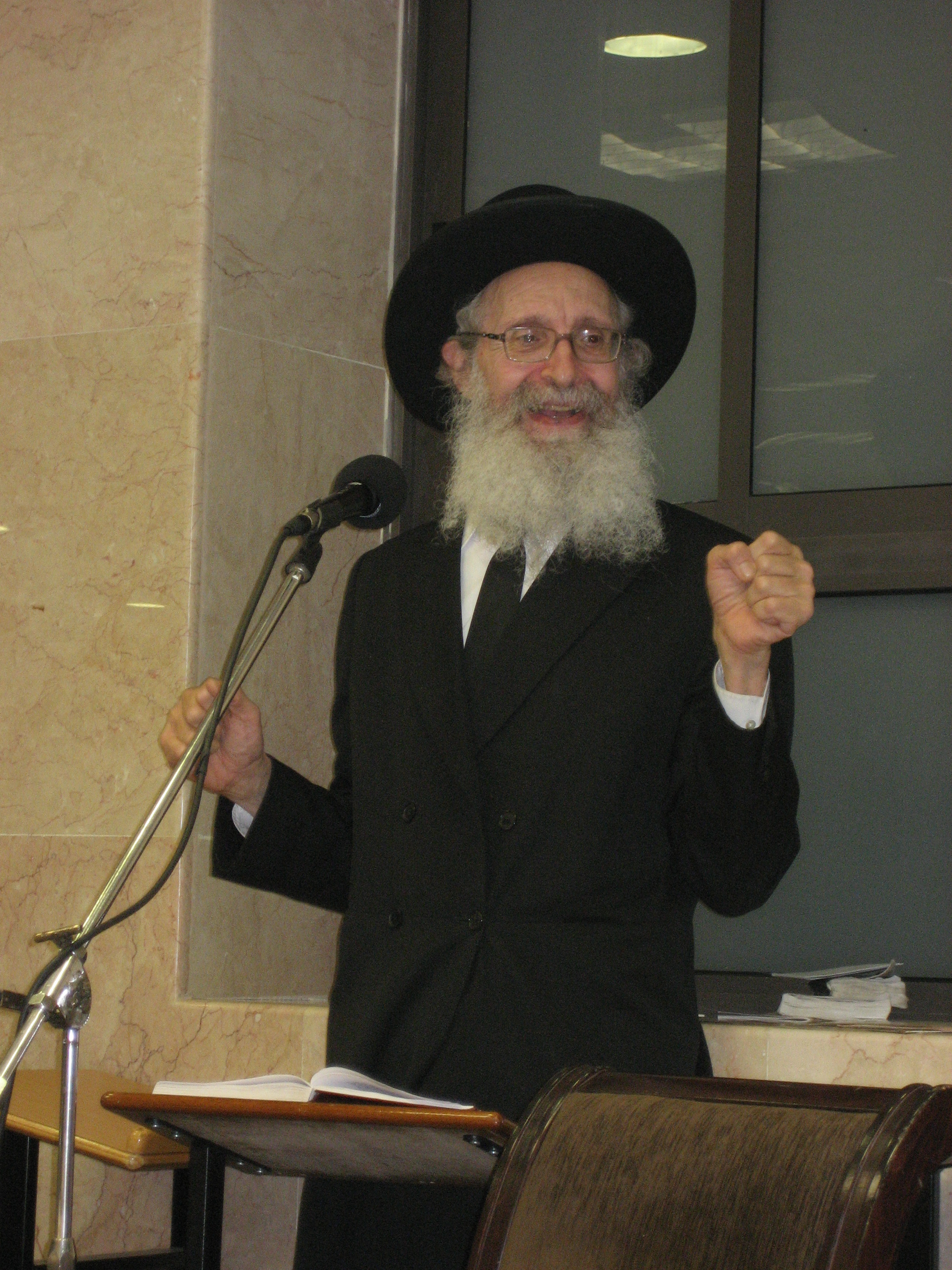
Rav Nosson Tzvi Finkel speaking

To accommodate the ever-increasing enrollment, Finkel fund-raised for and constructed four new buildings in addition to the original yeshiva building constructed by Reb Leizer Yudel in 1949. He assigned separate battei medrash (study halls) for each group of students, making one for Israeli students, one for Americans, one for those who wished to study without a daily shiur, and so on. As enrollment continued to climb, several students of the main maggidei shiur (lecturers) began delivering shiurim in English, and Finkel raised the funds to open a new beis medrash in 2006 for these shiurim too. Yet another beis medrash was built in recent years. The Mir also opened a yeshiva gedola for Israeli students in the Brachfeld neighborhood of Modi'in Illit where Finkel gave shiurim and occasional shmuessen (musar talks), and a yeshiva ketana in the Ramat Shlomo neighborhood of Jerusalem.

In an unusual move for a Litvish yeshiva, Finkel accepted 800 Hasidic students and allowed them to learn in their own chabura and follow their own customs, including a fartug (pre-dawn study session) before morning prayers. This group, known as Chaburas Ameilim BaTorah (the "Toiling in Torah" Study Group), was housed in a different neighborhood, but the week before his death, Finkel moved them onto Mir yeshiva premises. He participated in their Thursday-night study sessions as well as their seudot mitzvah (festival meals) marking a siyum, and Hanukkah parties.

Notwithstanding the Mir's huge enrollment, Finkel tried to remember the name of each student. He also remembered personal details about each of his alumni and donors abroad. His brother-in-law, Rabbi Aharon Lopiansky, rosh yeshiva of the Yeshiva of Greater Washington, said that at Mir dinners, 1,000 people could be waiting to speak with the rosh yeshiva, "and almost every single one on the line was someone he had had a personal connection with".

Despite his busy schedule, Finkel also expressed a willingness to learn in chavruta with any student who asked. It was estimated that he studied with approximately 80 people every week. Like his great-uncle Reb Leizer Yudel, Finkel offered cash incentives for Torah study, challenging his students to learn many pages of Talmud and study for large blocks of time. He regularly hosted siyums for students in his own home and at his own expense.

Finkel shouldered the responsibility for raising funds for this giant Torah enterprise. Despite his disease and its side effects, he traveled twice a year to England and the United States. In the past two years, the economic recession saw the yeshiva's debts mounting quicker than they were being met, with salaries and kollel stipends running months behind. Finkel was said to be very upset by this state of affairs.

== Illness ==
Finkel was diagnosed with Parkinson's disease in the late 1980s. Though he experienced much difficulty in walking and talking, and suffered from involuntary tremors and spasms and slurred speech, he continued to learn for hours every day and gave regular shiurim in the yeshiva, as well as embarked on regular fund-raising trips abroad. In later years, when he felt too weak to sit in a chair during the chaburas (small-group learning sessions) that he organized for students in his home, he would lie down on a couch and encourage the students to begin the session. He refused to take medication for his condition, since the drugs could make his mind foggy or cause memory loss and he didn't want to risk forgetting his Torah studies. He only took medication that provided temporary relief from his symptoms.

== Death ==
At 6 a.m. in his home on November 8, 2011 (11 Cheshvan 5772), Finkel suddenly lost consciousness. EMS personnel attempted to revive him for 50 minutes while students of the Mir stood outside in the street praying for him. His personal doctor summoned to the home determined that he had died of cardiac arrest.

An estimated 100,000 people attended his funeral, which began at the Mir yeshiva in Beit Yisrael and continued on foot to Har HaMenuchot, where he was buried next to Rabbi Chaim Shmuelevitz, a former rosh yeshiva of the Mir, and close by the graves of Reb Leizer Yudel and Rabbi Binyomin Beinish Finkel. The Edah HaChareidis ordered all Haredi businesses to close during the funeral, and Litvishe Torah leaders Rabbi Yosef Shalom Eliashiv and Aharon Leib Shteinman instructed teachers and students of Talmud Torahs, yeshivas, and kollels to join the funeral procession. The procession was so large that it blocked the entrance to the city and halted operations of the Jerusalem Light Rail, as tens of thousands of mourners crossed the tracks of the Jerusalem Chords Bridge en route to the cemetery.

Finkel's death was a double blow for the Jerusalem Litvish yeshiva world, coming one day after the death of Rabbi Dov Schwartzman, another respected Litvish rosh yeshiva in Jerusalem. Rabbi Finkel participated in Rabbi Schwartzman's funeral on 7 November.

At the funeral it was announced that Finkel's eldest son, Rabbi Eliezer Yehuda Finkel, would succeed his father as rosh yeshiva.
