= Umm el-Umdan =

Jewish archeological site in Israel

- אום אל עומדן (Hebrew)
- Remains of the synagogue

- Location within Israel
- 31°53′02″N 34°59′48″E
- Type: Settlement, synagogue
- Periods: Second Temple period (Hellenistic with Hasmonean period, Early Roman period); Late Roman, Byzantine and Early Muslim periods
- Cultures: Jewish
- Location: Israel

Site notes
- Excavation dates: 2000–2003
- Archaeologists: Alexander Onn and Shlomit Weksler-Bdolah
- Condition: In ruins
- Public access: Yes

Khirbet Umm el-Umdan (Arabic: خربة أم العمدان, lit. 'ruins of the mother of the columns') or in short, Umm el-Umdan (Hebrew: אום אל-עומדאן), is an archaeological site located in Modi'in, Israel, which preserves the remains of an ancient Jewish settlement. It includes the remains of a synagogue thought to be one of the earliest discovered in Israel, a mikveh (Jewish ritual bath), agricultural installations, and rock-cut tombs.

The site's ancient name remains unverified. It is often regarded as one of several possible locations of the ancient Jewish village of Modi’in, hometown of the Maccabees. Excavators Shlomit Weksler-Bdolah, Alexander Onn, and Yehuda Rapuano suggest that the name "Umm el-Umdan" may preserve the name Modi’in. Other candidate sites exist in the area.

== Etymology ==
The Arabic name of the site, Khirbet el 'Eumdan or Khirbet Umm el-‘Umdan, means 'mother of columns', named after the remains visible at the site.

== Archaeological findings ==
French archaeologist Charles Simon Clermont-Ganneau visited the site in 1873 and suggested the ruins were the remains of a church. Rescue excavations were carried out at the site between 2000 and 2003 ahead of the planned construction of residential buildings for Modi'in.

=== Synagogue ===
It was first built during the Hasmonean period and stood between the end of the 2nd and the late 1st century BCE, when it was rebuilt during the Herodian period. The synagogue of the late Roman period was destroyed in the Bar Kokhba revolt.

The Umm el-Umdan synagogue should not be confused with a second 1st-century BCE synagogue discovered at nearby Qiryat Sefer/Modi'in Illit at the site of Khirbet Badd 'Isa, on the Ascent of Beth-Horon (see here and here).

==== Findings ====
Two column rows with 4 columns on each side, whose bases were unearthed, split the later-phase synagogue into three naves.

==== Mikveh ====
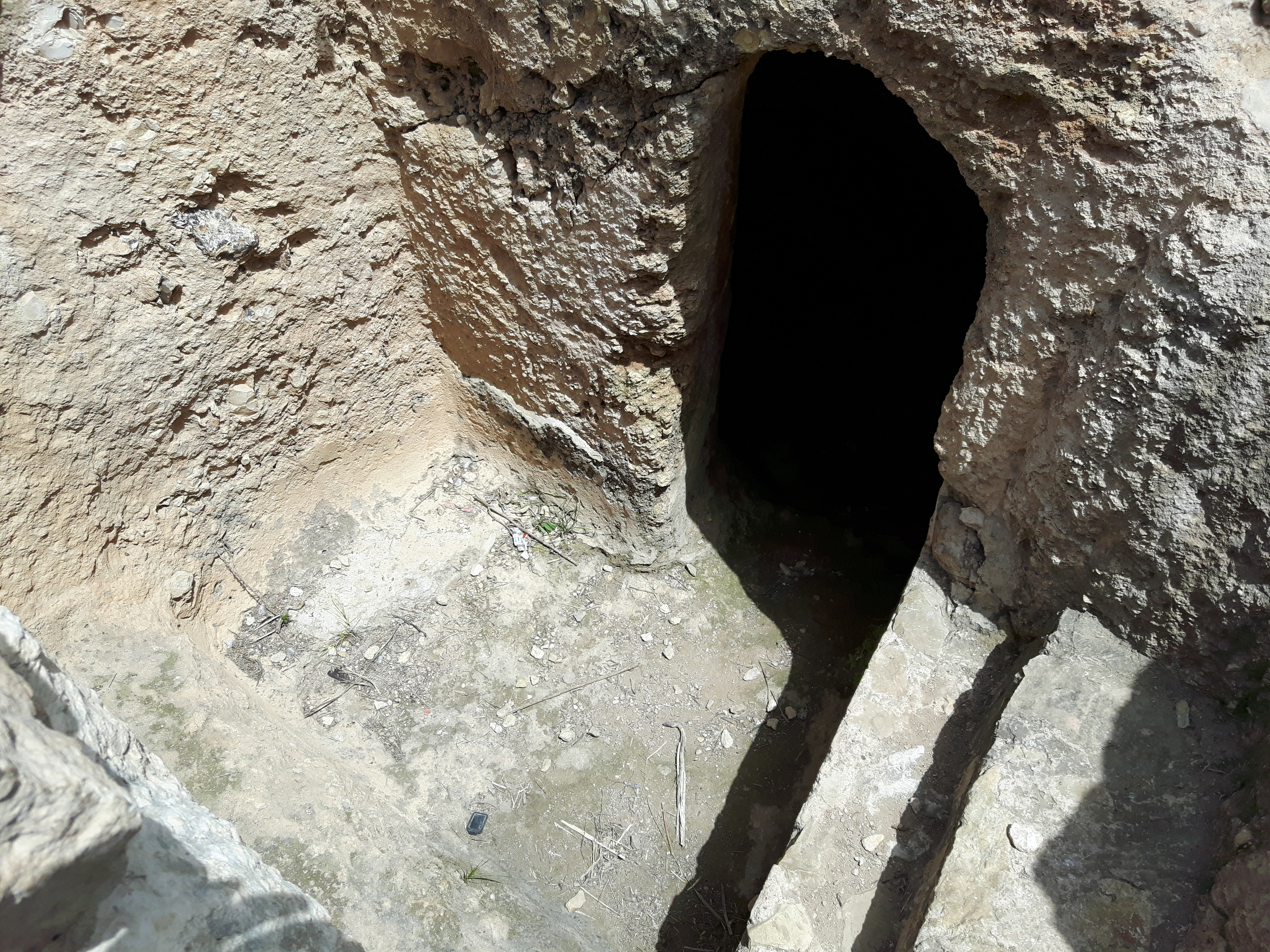
The mikveh at Umm el-Umdan

West of the synagogue a mikve was discovered, dated to the Herodian period (the second phase of the synagogue). During the Hasmonean period (the first phase of the synagogue) there was already a sitting bath in the courtyard.

=== Burial caves ===
Burial complexes dating to the Second Temple period were found to the east and south of the village.

== Identification ==
Umm el-Umdan is regarded as one of the potential locations of the ancient Jewish village of Modi'in, which is known to have been situated in the area of modern Modi'in, though its exact position has never been definitively determined. This theory has been supported by excavators Shlomit Wexler-Bdolah, Alexander Onn, and Yehuda Rapuano, who suggest that the name "Umm el-Umdan" may preserve the name Modi'in. However, the name, meaning "the mother of columns" in Arabic, also appears in other locations within Israel. Alternative theories propose other sites, including Tell er-Ras, Khirbet el-Hammam (Khirbet Midiyeh), and Giv'at Tittora.

== See also ==
- Ancient synagogues in Israel
