= Modi'in Illit =

Illegal Israeli settlement in the West Bank

Coordinates: 31°55′50″N 35°2′30″E

Modi'in Illit: מוֹדִיעִין עִלִּית; موديعين عيليت
- City (from 2008)
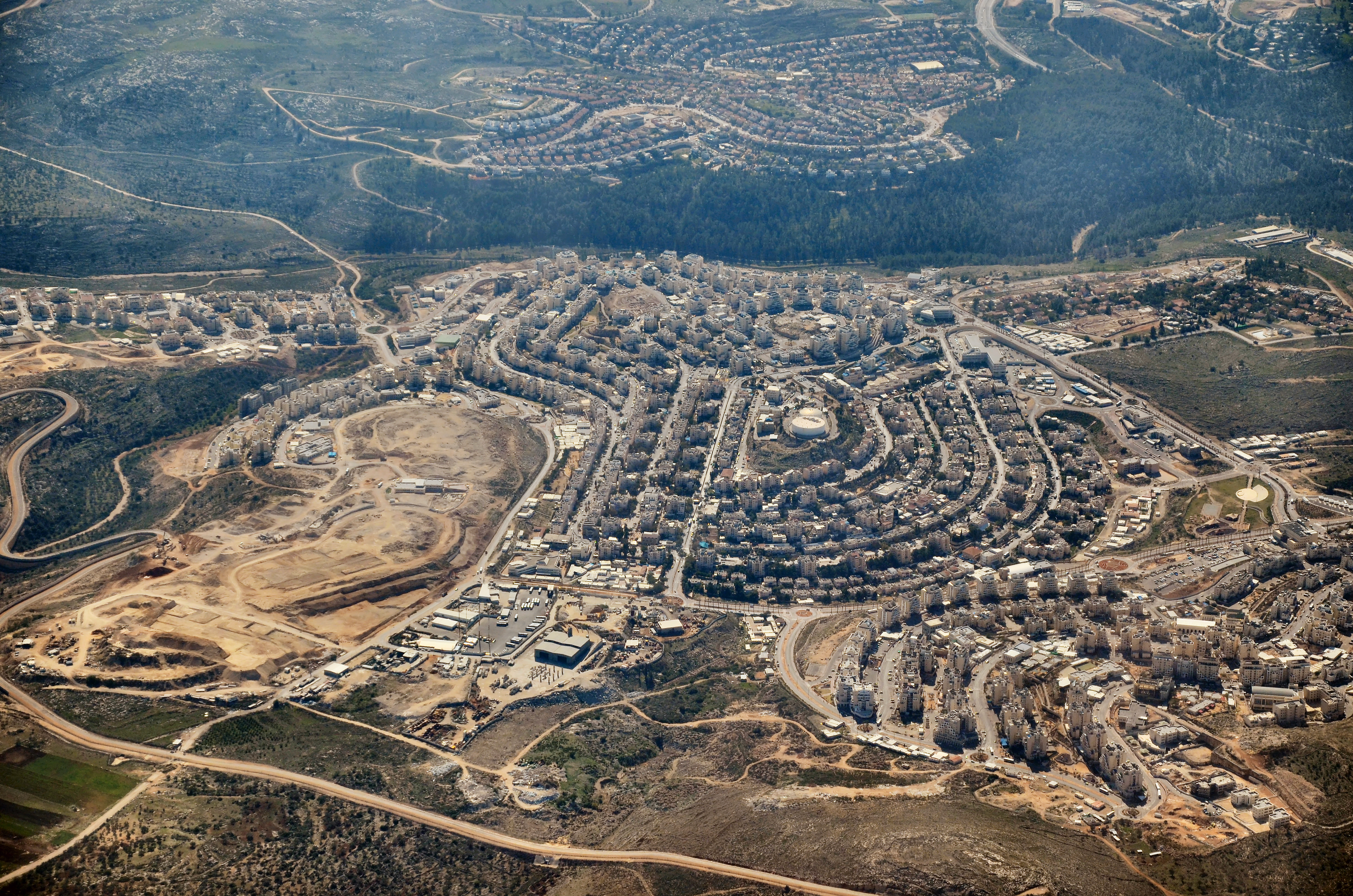

- Interactive map of Modi'in Illit
- Location within the West Bank
- Region: West Bank
- District: Judea and Samaria Area
- Founded: 1994

Government
  - Mayor: Yaakov Gutterman

Area
  - Total: 4,746 dunams (4.746 km^{2}; 1.832 sq mi)

Population (2024)
  - Total: 89,627
  - Density: 18,880/km^{2} (48,910/sq mi)
- Name meaning: Upper Modi'in

Modi'in Illit (Hebrew: מוֹדִיעִין עִלִּית, lit. 'Upper Modi'in'; Arabic: موديعين عيليت) is a Haredi Jewish-Israeli settlement organized as a city council in the West Bank, situated midway between Jerusalem and Tel Aviv.

Built on the land of five Palestinian villages–Ni'lin, Kharbata, Saffa, Bil'in, and Dir Qadis–Modi'in Illit was granted city status by the Israeli government in 2008.

It is located six kilometres (3 1/2 miles) northeast of Modi'in-Maccabim-Re'ut and is often referred to as Kiryat Sefer (lit. "Book Town"), the name of its first neighborhood, established in 1994. Modi'in Illit also encompasses the neighborhood of Achuzat Brachfeld (Brachfeld Estates). In 2024, it had a total population of 89,627, making it the largest Jewish settlement in the area. The international community has largely viewed Israeli settlements in the West Bank, referred to by Israel as Judea and Samaria, as illegal under international law. However, Israel disputes this interpretation and maintains that settlements are legal and consistent with international law, citing historical, legal, and security reasons. This position has been upheld by successive Israeli governments.

Two archaeological sites lie within the settlement's area: Khirbet Badd 'Isa and Khirbet Abu ad-Danin. Both were Jewish villages of the late Second Temple period, abandoned after the Bar Kokhba revolt and resettled on a limited scale in Late Antiquity.

== History ==
A place named Kiryat Sefer (also called Dvir) is mentioned several times in the Book of Joshua and in the Book of Judges. However, this place is situated south of Hebron, and the Israeli Governmental names committee rejected calling the town Kiryat Sefer as was proposed initially, electing the name Modi'in Illit.

According to ARIJ the settlement was built on the land confiscated from several Palestinian villages:

- 1,818 dunams from Deir Qaddis,
- 891 dunams from Bil'in,
- 833 dunams from Kharbatha Bani Harith,
- 384 dunams from Ni'lin.

The barrier surrounding the city divides the nearby village of Bil'in from most of its olive groves and other agricultural land and is the subject of the documentary 5 Broken Cameras. The homes in Kiryat Sefer were completed in 1994, and the local council of Modi'in Illit was given city status on March 7, 2008. In keeping with its name, which means "Book Town," most of Kiryat Sefer's streets are named after a landmark sefer (book) written by Gedolei Yisrael. These include: Chofetz Chaim, Noda BiYehuda, Meshech Chochma, Avnei Nezer, and Sdei Chemed.

== Geography and climate ==
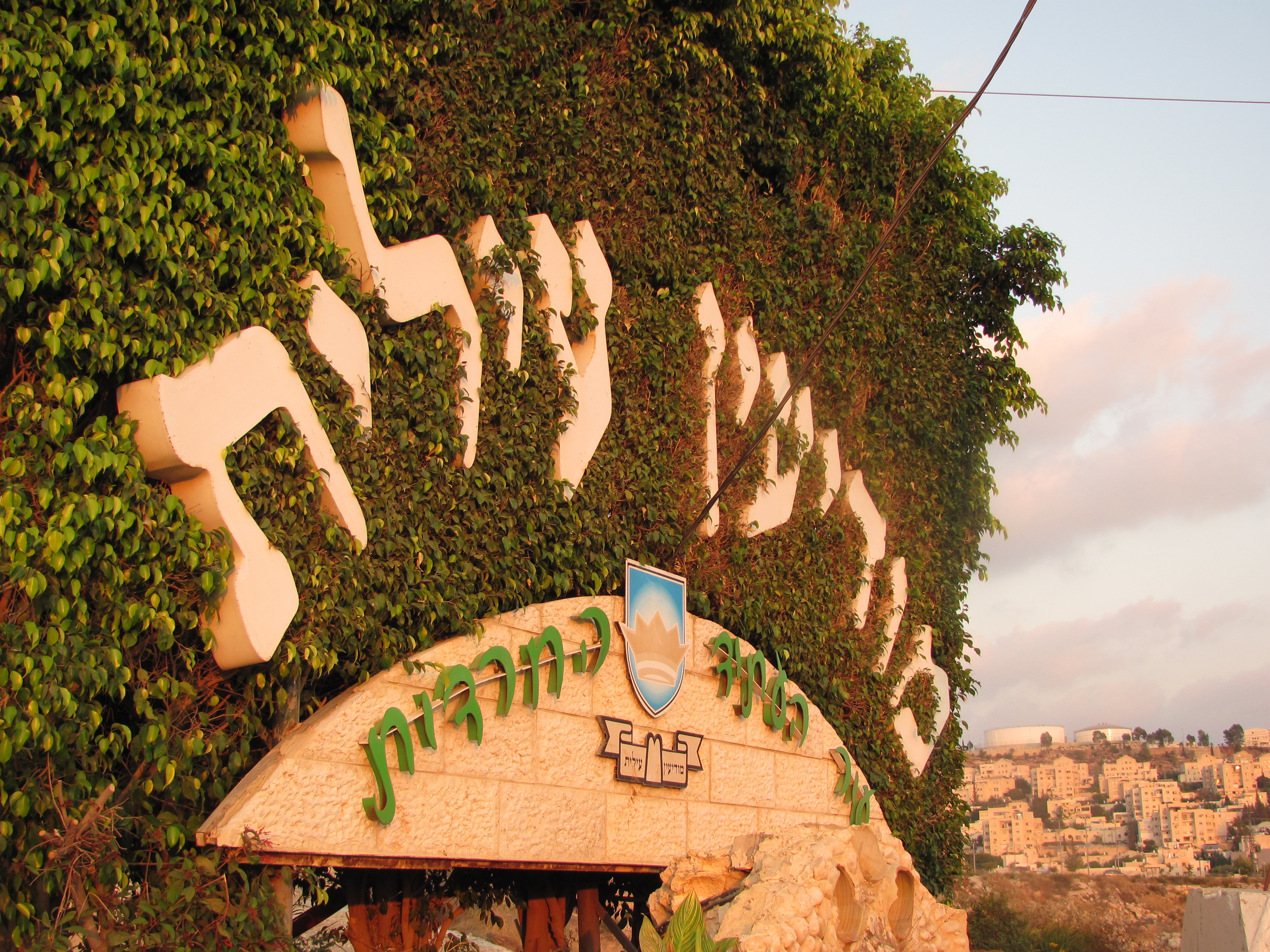
Welcome sign for Modi'in Illit, with the small inscription, "Haredi City of the Future". The homes of Kiryat Sefer and its water towers are in the background.

Situated in the West Bank, north of Modi'in, Modi'in Illit lies 2.3 km (1 3/8 mi) from the Green Line, and 5 km (3 mi) from the 443 highway. Located in the foothills of the Judean Mountains 286 m (938 ft) above sea level, Modi'in Illit has mild winters and hot, dry summers with temperatures averaging 30 °C (86 °F) during the day. Modi'in Illit's immediate neighbors are moshav Matityahu, Lapid, and Hashmonaim.

== Archaeology ==
=== Khirbet Badd ‘Isa ===
An archaeological site now known as Khirbet Badd 'Isa was discovered during a salvage dig by the archaeology department of the Civil Administration in Modi'in Illit in 1994. The excavations eventually revealed what is believed to have been a large Jewish village from the Second Temple period with a public structure in the center, which probably served as a synagogue, at least three ritual baths, private homes (some built with Herodian blocks), an oil press, warehouses, and a collection of 145 Roman coins from the first century CE. Archaeological data indicate that the village was established during the Hellenistic period and existed up until the First Jewish–Roman War (c. 66–73 CE). It was resettled by Jews who later took part in the Bar Kokhba revolt (c. 132–136 CE). The site was destroyed during the revolt and remained uninhabited up until the third century. This settlement gap may mark the end of the Jewish settlement and the arrival of a new population at the area.

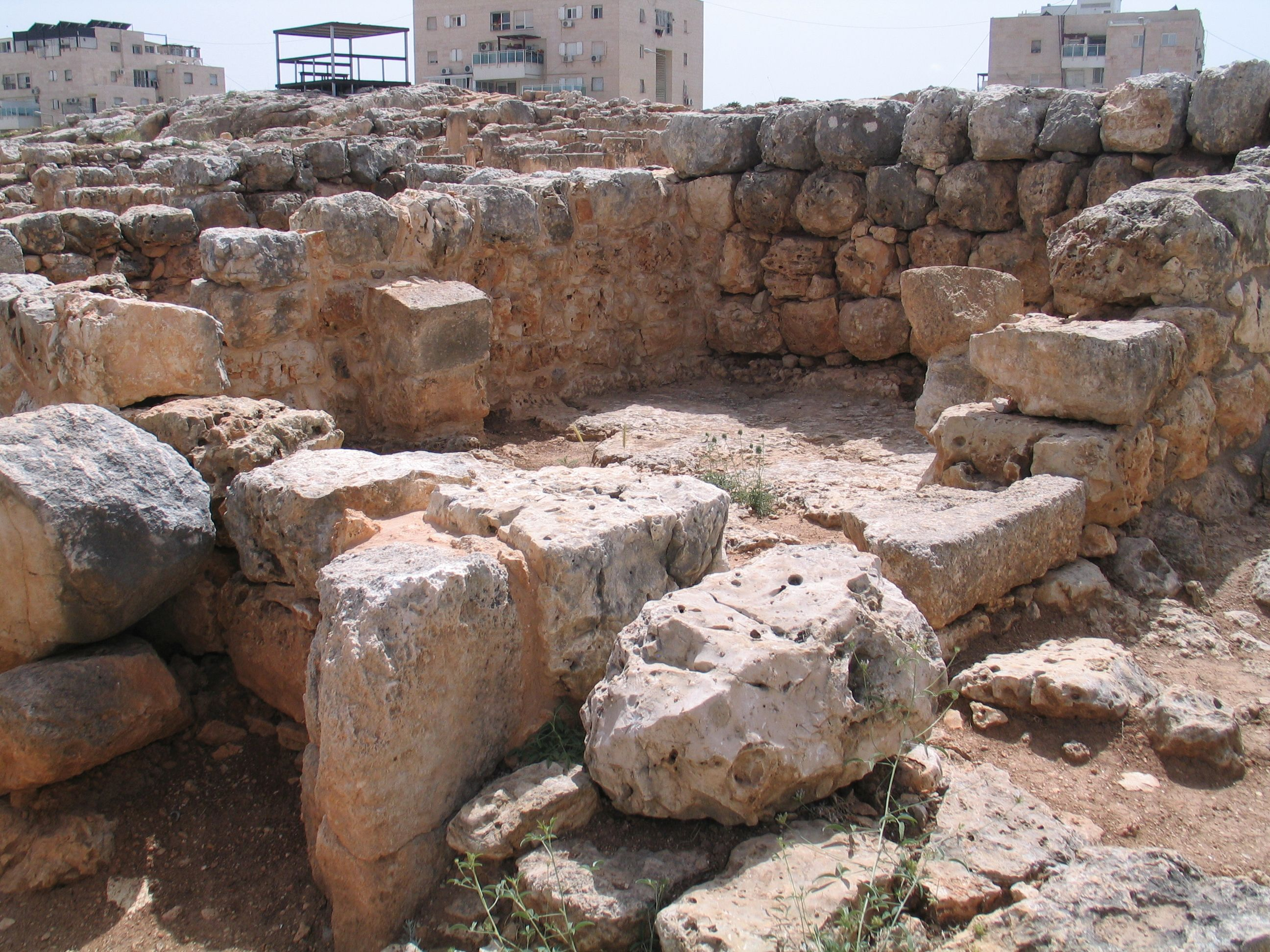
Ruins of the Second Temple period Jewish village of Khirbet Badd 'Isa

The excavations at the site were first protested by the Haredi community, but after the discovery Khirbet Badd ‘Isa was designated "a heritage site for the Haredi public" in 2011, and the Israeli government contributed NIS 3 million to develop the site, with another NIS 1 million reportedly coming from the Civil Administration. According to Mod'in Illit's Mayor Yaakov Gutterman of the Degel HaTorah party, the site "will operate according to the doctrines of our forefathers, according to the Jewish historical sources presented by the Bible, the Gemara and ancient Jewish sages only [and] will be open only to the Haredi public, which will keep it a proper place for them to visit and connect to their Jewish roots, without the distortions and disruptions of other places, where there is fear of hearing false opinions."

=== Ḥorvat Abu a-Danin ===
Another archeological site called Khirbet Abu ad-Danin is located on the northern slope of Nahal Modi'im, directly south of the city's built-up area. Finkelstein surveyed the site in the 1980s, and suggested that a public building might be located in the middle of the site. In 2004 and 2005, excavations were conducted, and uncovered the ruins of a rural Jewish village from the late Second Temple period. Archeological findings indicate that the community was founded in the second century BCE, had its apex in the first centuries BCE and CE, and ceased to exist following the Bar Kokhba revolt. The site underwent some minor resettlement in the late Roman and Byzantine eras.

== Demographics ==
Historical population
Year	Pop.	±%
1995	5,500	—
1999	13,000	+136.4%
2002	20,200	+55.4%
2005	30,500	+51.0%
2007	38,047	+24.7%
2010	48,100	+26.4%
2015	63,200	+31.4%
2022	83,356	+31.9%
2025	90,712	+8.8%
Source: CBS

According to the Israel Central Bureau of Statistics (CBS), as of the end of 2009, the city had a total population of 46,200, making it the largest Israeli settlement in the West Bank. The city had an annual growth rate of 13.2 percent in 2009, due to new home construction and natural population growth. An estimated 80 percent of the population is under age 30, and in 2006 the city's median age stood at 10, the lowest of all Israeli municipalities.

Age distribution (2007)
Age	0–4	5–9	10–14	15–19	20–29	30–44	45–59	60–64	65–74	75+
Percentage	28.8	19.4	8.6	4.8	19.4	14	3.3	0.6	0.7	0.4
Source: Israel Central Bureau of Statistics

== Education ==
Modi'in Illit has 30 elementary schools and 20 secondary schools (seminaries and yeshivas). Achuzat Brachfeld (Brachfeld Estates) is home to the Mir Brachfeld branch of the famous Mir Yeshiva.

The city is home to many commercial enterprises. Because of its sizable English-speaking immigrant population, it has become a center for outsourcing by American companies. There are approximately 80 synagogues. A significant number of men study the Torah full-time.

== Local government ==
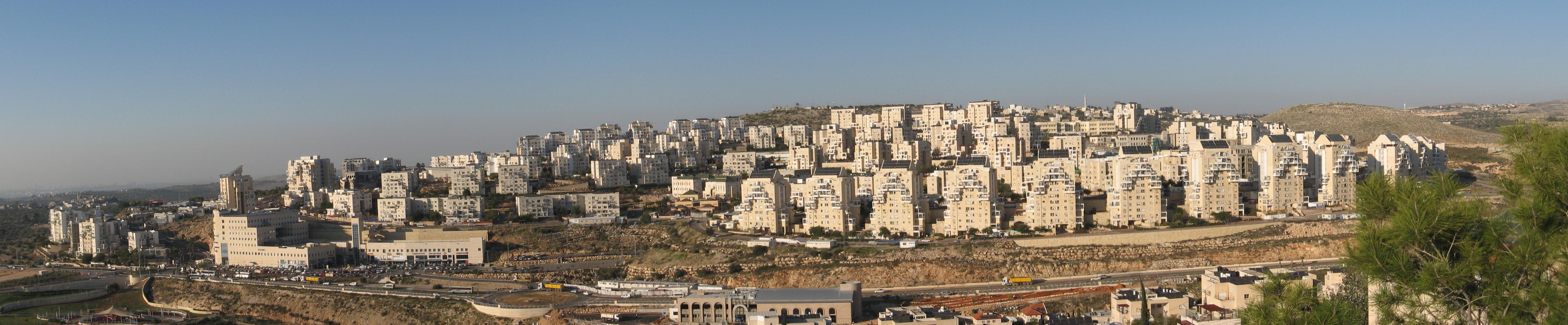

Yaakov Gutterman of the Degel HaTorah party, a rabbi, is the town's mayor. The first head of council of Modi'in Illit was Yosef Schwinger, appointed by the Ministry of the Interior. Yaakov Gutterman replaced him in 2002, and has been reinstated twice when he ran for election uncontested.

The Chief Rabbi and head of Rabbinical Court of Modi'in Illit is Rabbi Meir Kessler.

== Voting patterns ==
In the 2022 election, 99.7 percent of voters in Modi'in Illit voted for the parties of the right-wing coalition led by Benjamin Netanyahu, while 0.1 percent voted for the parties of the center-left coalition led by Yair Lapid and 0.01 percent voted for the Arab parties. 97 percent of voters voted for the Haredi parties Shas or UTJ.

In the 2026 election, 94 percent of voters in Modi'in Illit voted for the parties of the right-wing coalition led by Benjamin Netanyahu, while 0.2 percent voted for the parties of the center-left coalition led by Gadi Eisenkot and 0.02 percent voted for the Arab parties. 91 percent of voters voted for the Haredi parties Shas or UTJ. Voter turnout increased 24 percent from the 2022 election.

== Israeli–Palestinian conflict ==
=== Legal status of the settlement ===
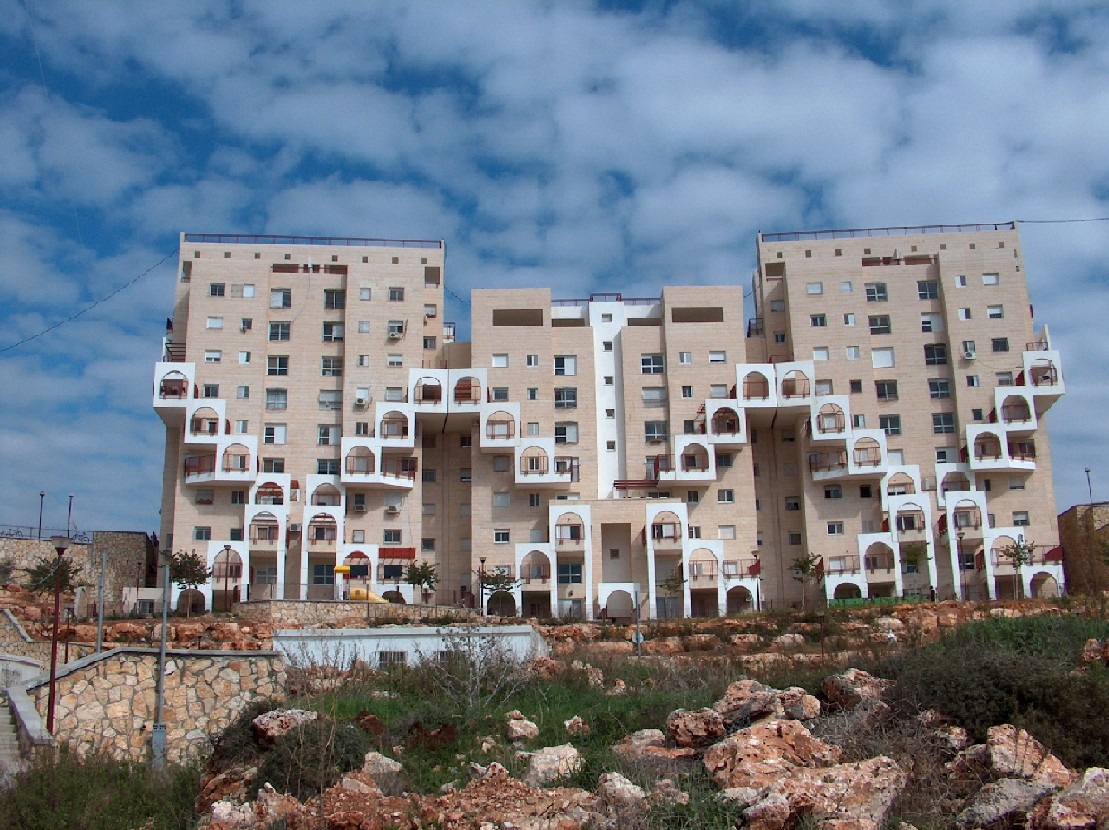
Residential buildings

The international community considers Israeli settlements to violate the Fourth Geneva Convention's prohibition on the transfer of an occupying power's civilian population into occupied territory and are as such illegal under customary international law. Israel disputes that the Fourth Geneva Convention applies to the Palestinian territories as they had not been legally held by a sovereign prior to Israel taking control of them. This view has been rejected by the International Court of Justice and the International Committee of the Red Cross.

Modi'in Illit was granted city status in 2008, by Aluf Gadi Shamni. The Israeli NGO B'Tselem appealed the decision to the Ministry of Interior. B'Tselem claimed that the upgrading of Modi'in Illit's status to that of a municipality was of concern because the land on which Mod'in Illit was built was declared state land through a manipulative application of Ottoman Law, resulting in the confiscation of lands belonging to neighbouring Palestinian villages. B'Tselem also stated that the upgraded status would lead to an increase of the settler population of Modi'in Illit, and thus the change in status would be illegal. For these reasons, B'Tselem expressed "vehement opposition" to the change of status. In connection with separate allegations that the city has allowed illegal construction to take place, the Israel Defense Forces told Israel's Interior Ministry in May 2008 that Modi'in Illit was "in a state of lawlessness."

Israel's West Bank Barrier passes just east of Modi'in Illit. The barrier's section in this area was built to separate the Modi'in bloc settlements of Mattityahu, Modi'in Illit and Hashmonaim from the Palestinian villages of Bil'in and others. The Israeli government believes that Modi'in Illit would remain within Israeli jurisdiction in a final-status agreement with the Palestinians.

=== Attack on residents ===
On the morning of 29 December 2008, a Palestinian worker who had worked in the settlement of Modi'in Illit for more than a decade attacked four Israelis, leaving one victim seriously and three others lightly wounded. He first stabbed two people for whom he was carrying out renovations in a private home, wounding them lightly, and then stabbed and seriously wounded his Israeli employer who was overseeing the work. After stabbing a fourth person at a different location, he was shot and seriously wounded by a settlement security official and Magen David Adom volunteer as he attempted to flee out of the settlement. Reportedly, the assailant had been very friendly with Israelis for years. According to an Israel Police spokesperson, the stabbing was a "spontaneous" act in response to the aerial offensive on the Gaza Strip that Israel had started two days earlier.

== Notable residents ==
- Aryeh Finkel, rabbi
- Meir Kessler, second rabbi of Modi'in Illit
- Gadi Pollack, illustrator and author
- Yishai Schlissel, convicted murderer
