= Yaquq =

Yaquq ياقوق
- Village
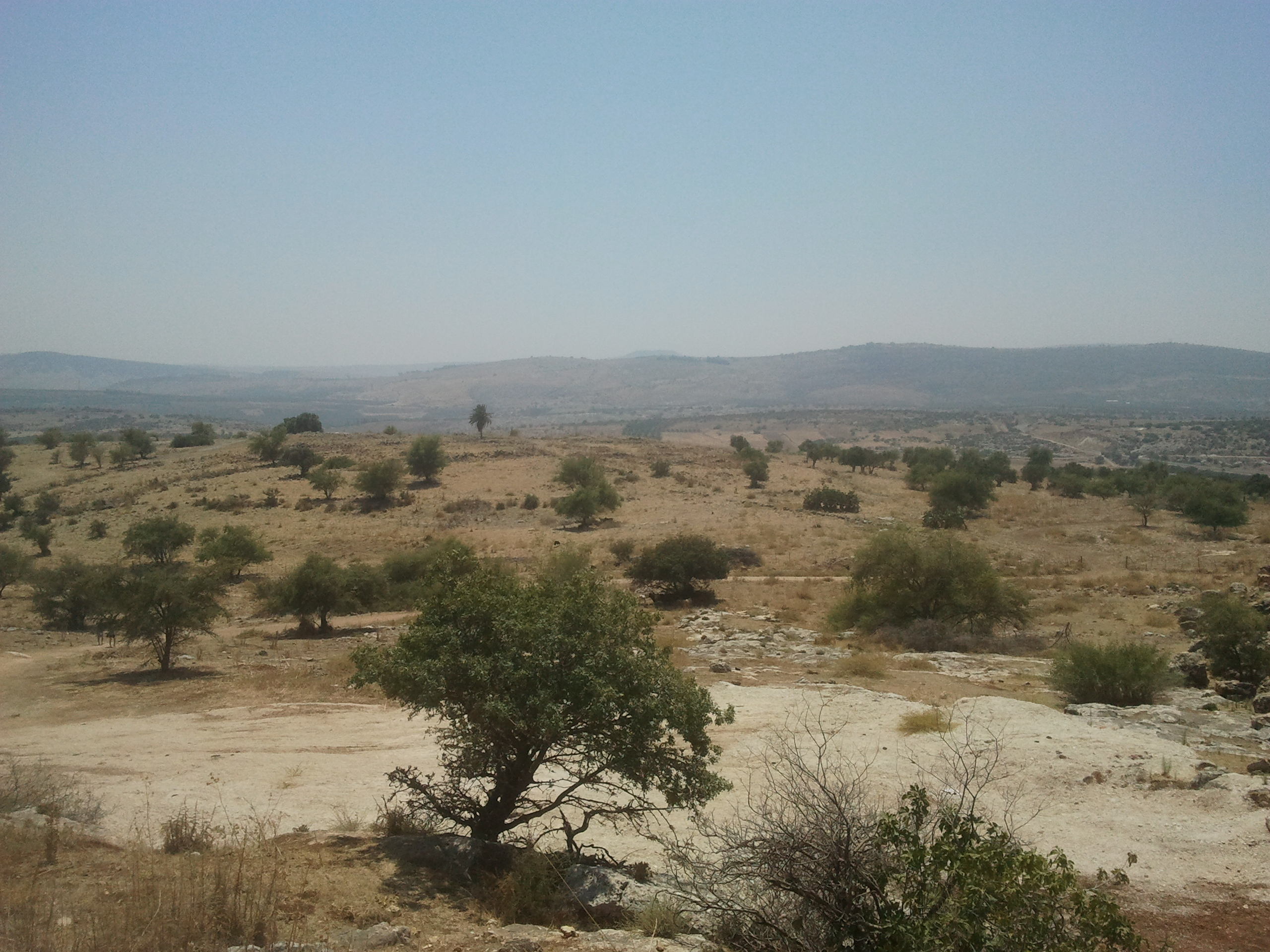
- Etymology: from personal name
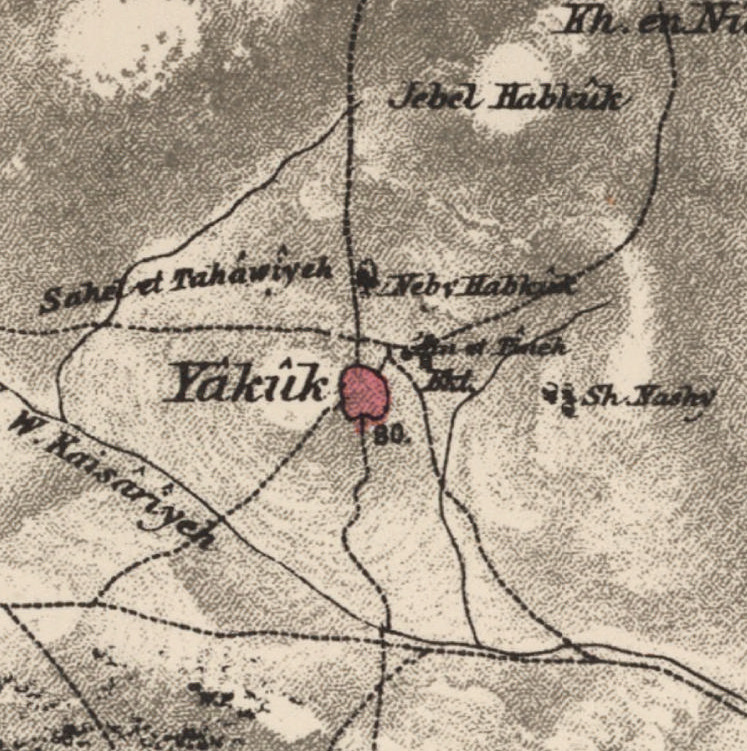
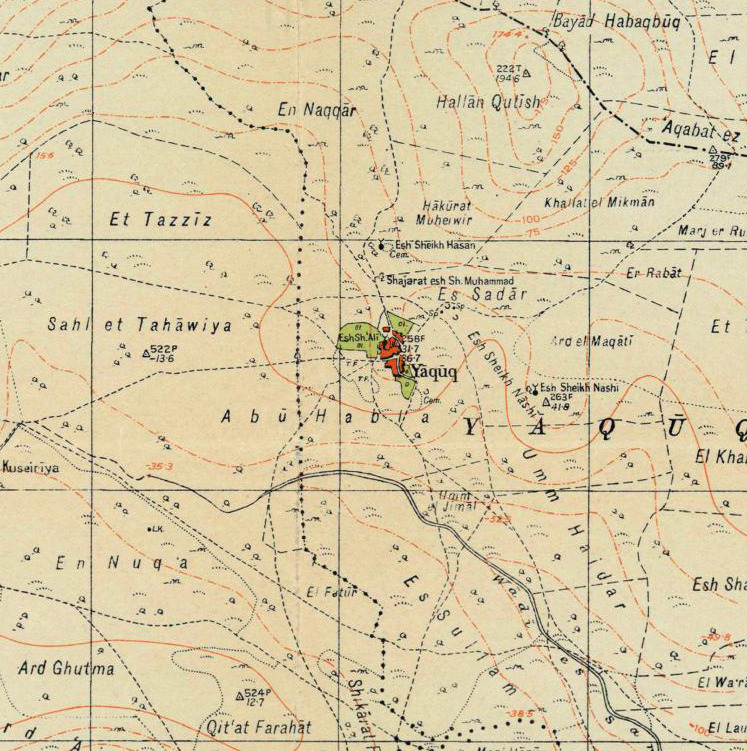
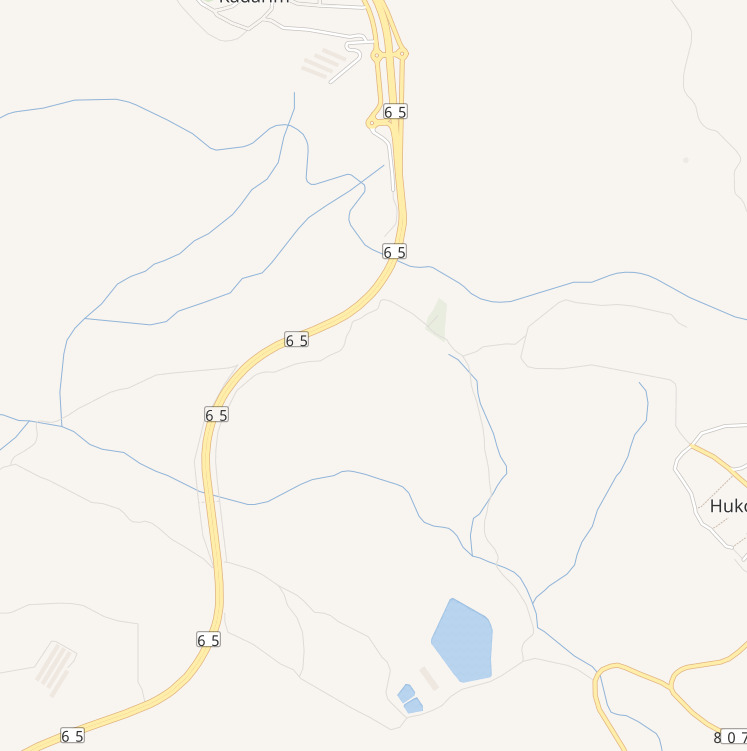
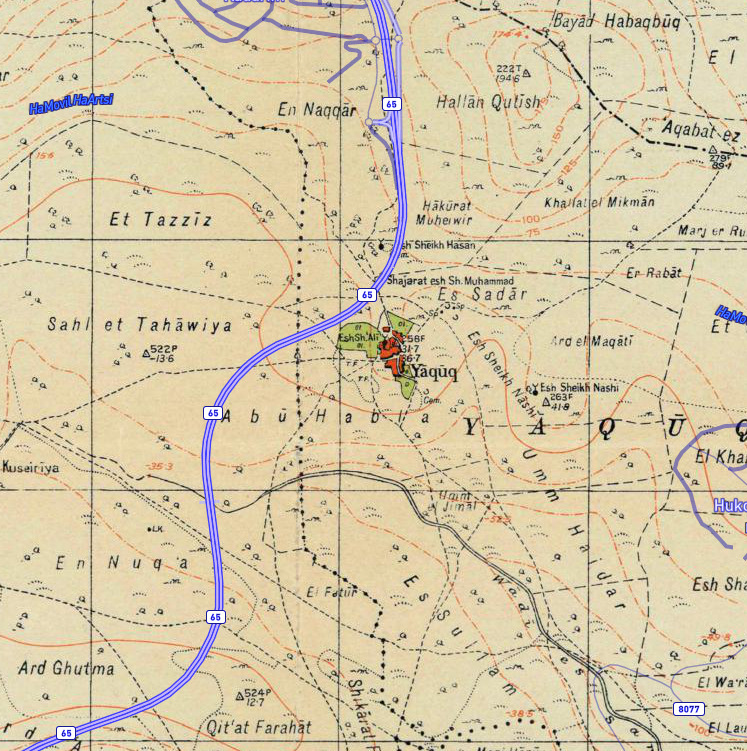
- 1870s map 1940s map modern map 1940s with modern overlay map A series of historical maps of the area around Yaquq (click the buttons)

- Location within Mandatory Palestine
- Coordinates: 32°53′5″N 35°28′44″E
- Palestine grid: 195/254
- Geopolitical entity: Mandatory Palestine
- Subdistrict: Tiberias
- Date of depopulation: May, 1948

Area
  - Total: 4,229 dunams (4.229 km^{2}; 1.633 sq mi)

Population (1945)
  - Total: 210
- Current Localities: Hukok

Yaquq (Arabic: ياقوق) was a Palestinian village that was destroyed during the 1947–1948 civil war in Mandatory Palestine on May 1, 1948. It was located 12.5 kilometres (7.8 mi) north of Tiberias and was built at the site of the ancient village of Huqoq.

== History ==
The site shows signs of early Canaanite settlement, and held by scholars to be the biblical Huqoq, known in Roman times as Hucuca. The earliest mention of the name Yaquq is in the text Signs of the Tomb Inscription by Rabbi Jacob, emissary of the Yeshiva of Rabbi Jehiel of Paris (before 1257 CE).

=== Ottoman era ===
In the 1596 tax records, Yaquq was a part of the Ottoman nahiya ("subdistrict") of Jira, part of Safad Sanjak. It had a population of 70 households and 2 bachelors, an estimated 396 persons, all Muslims. The villagers paid a fixed tax rate of 25% on a number of crops and produce, including wheat, barley and olives, goats, beehives, and a press which was either used for processing grapes or olives; a total of 5,186 akçe. 1/24 of the revenue went to a waqf.

In 1838, Yaquq was noted as a Muslim village in the Esh-Shagur district, located between Safad, Acca and Tiberias.

In 1875 Victor Guérin described the village as having about 20 stone houses. In 1881, the PEF's Survey of Western Palestine described it as having about 200 Muslim inhabitants, surrounded by arable land. There were many cisterns in the area, and there was a "good spring" there.

A population list from about 1887 showed that Yaquq had 105 inhabitants; all Muslim.

=== British Mandate era ===
In the 1922 census of Palestine, conducted by the British Mandate authorities, Yaquq wa Mawasi had a population of 294; all Muslims, decreasing in the 1931 census to 153; still all Muslims, in a total of 28 houses.

In the 1945 statistics it had a population of 210 Muslims, and the total land area was 8,507 dunams. Of this, 1,010 dunams were used for cereals, 24 dunams irrigated or used for orchards, while 13 dunams were built-up (urban) area.

A kibbutz using the old Biblical name of Hukok was established near the site on 11 July 1945.

=== 1948, aftermath ===
Following its depopulation in May 1948, the village was used as a training site for the Israeli army until it was bulldozed in 1968. Khalidi described the place in 1992:

Stone rubble covers the entire site. There is one palm tree in the center and an olive grove on the edge. Part of the surrounding land is cultivated by Israelis, while the remainder is used as a grazing area. A canal that passes to the west is part of the Israeli National Water Carrier, the water project that carries water from Lake Tiberias to the central coastal plains.

== Bibliography ==
- Barron, J.B., ed. (1923). Palestine: Report and General Abstracts of the Census of 1922. Government of Palestine.
- Conder, C.R.; Kitchener, H.H. (1881). The Survey of Western Palestine: Memoirs of the Topography, Orography, Hydrography, and Archaeology. Vol. 1. London: Committee of the Palestine Exploration Fund.
- Government of Palestine, Department of Statistics (1945). Village Statistics, April, 1945.
- Guérin, V. (1880). Description Géographique Historique et Archéologique de la Palestine (in French). Vol. 3: Galilee, pt. 1. Paris: L'Imprimerie Nationale.
- Hadawi, S. (1970). Village Statistics of 1945: A Classification of Land and Area ownership in Palestine. Palestine Liberation Organization Research Center. Archived from the original on 2018-12-08.
- Hütteroth, W.-D.; Abdulfattah, K. (1977). Historical Geography of Palestine, Transjordan and Southern Syria in the Late 16th Century. Erlanger Geographische Arbeiten, Sonderband 5. Erlangen, Germany: Vorstand der Fränkischen Geographischen Gesellschaft. ISBN 3-920405-41-2.
- Khalidi, W. (1992). All That Remains: The Palestinian Villages Occupied and Depopulated by Israel in 1948. Washington D.C.: Institute for Palestine Studies. ISBN 0-88728-224-5.
- Leibner, Uzi (2009). Settlement and History in Hellenistic, Roman, and Byzantine Galilee: An Archaeological Survey of the Eastern Galilee. Tübingen: Mohr Siebeck. ISBN 9783161498718. OCLC 851335357.
- Magness, J. (2012-03-29). "Huqoq - 2011 Preliminary Report" (124). Hadashot Arkheologiyot – Excavations and Surveys in Israel.
- Magness, J.; Kisilevitz, Shua; Grey, Matthew; Spigel, Chad; Coussens, Brian (2013-08-26). "Huqoq - 2012 Preliminary Report" (125). Hadashot Arkheologiyot – Excavations and Surveys in Israel.
- Magness, J.; Kisilevitz, Shua; Grey, Matthew; Spigel, Chad; Coussens, Brian; Britt, Karen (2014-11-10). "Huqoq - 2013 Preliminary Report" (126). Hadashot Arkheologiyot – Excavations and Surveys in Israel.
- Magness, J.: “Samson in the Synagogue,” Biblical Archaeology Review 39.1 (2013), pp. 32–39, 66–67.
- Magness, J.: October 2013, Scholar’s Update: New Mosaics from the Huqoq Synagogue, BAS LIBRARY
- Mills, E., ed. (1932). Census of Palestine 1931. Population of Villages, Towns and Administrative Areas. Jerusalem: Government of Palestine.
- Morris, B. (2004). The Birth of the Palestinian Refugee Problem Revisited. Cambridge University Press. ISBN 978-0-521-00967-6.
- Palmer, E.H. (1881). The Survey of Western Palestine: Arabic and English Name Lists Collected During the Survey by Lieutenants Conder and Kitchener, R. E. Transliterated and Explained by E.H. Palmer. Committee of the Palestine Exploration Fund.
- Rhode, H. (1979). Administration and Population of the Sancak of Safed in the Sixteenth Century (PhD). Columbia University. Archived from the original on 2020-03-01.
- Robinson, E.; Smith, E. (1841). Biblical Researches in Palestine, Mount Sinai and Arabia Petraea: A Journal of Travels in the year 1838. Vol. 3. Boston: Crocker & Brewster.
- Schumacher, G. (1888). "Population list of the Liwa of Akka". Quarterly Statement - Palestine Exploration Fund. 20: 169–191.
