= Khirbet el-Hammam =

Khirbet el-Hammam, Khirbet al-Hammam, or Khirbet al-Hamam (Arabic: خربة الحمام, "the ruin of the bathhouse") may refer to:

- Khirbet el-Hammam (Narbata), an archaeological site in the northern West Bank, possibly biblical Arubboth and classical Narbata
- Khirbet al-Hammam (Khirbet Midiyeh), an archaeological site in central Israel, one of several locations identified with ancient Modi'in
- Khirbet Wadi Hammam, a Roman-period site in the Lower Galilee, Israel
- Khirbet al-Hamam, a village in Homs Governorate, Syria
