= Khirbet Wadi Hammam =

Archaeological site in northern Israel

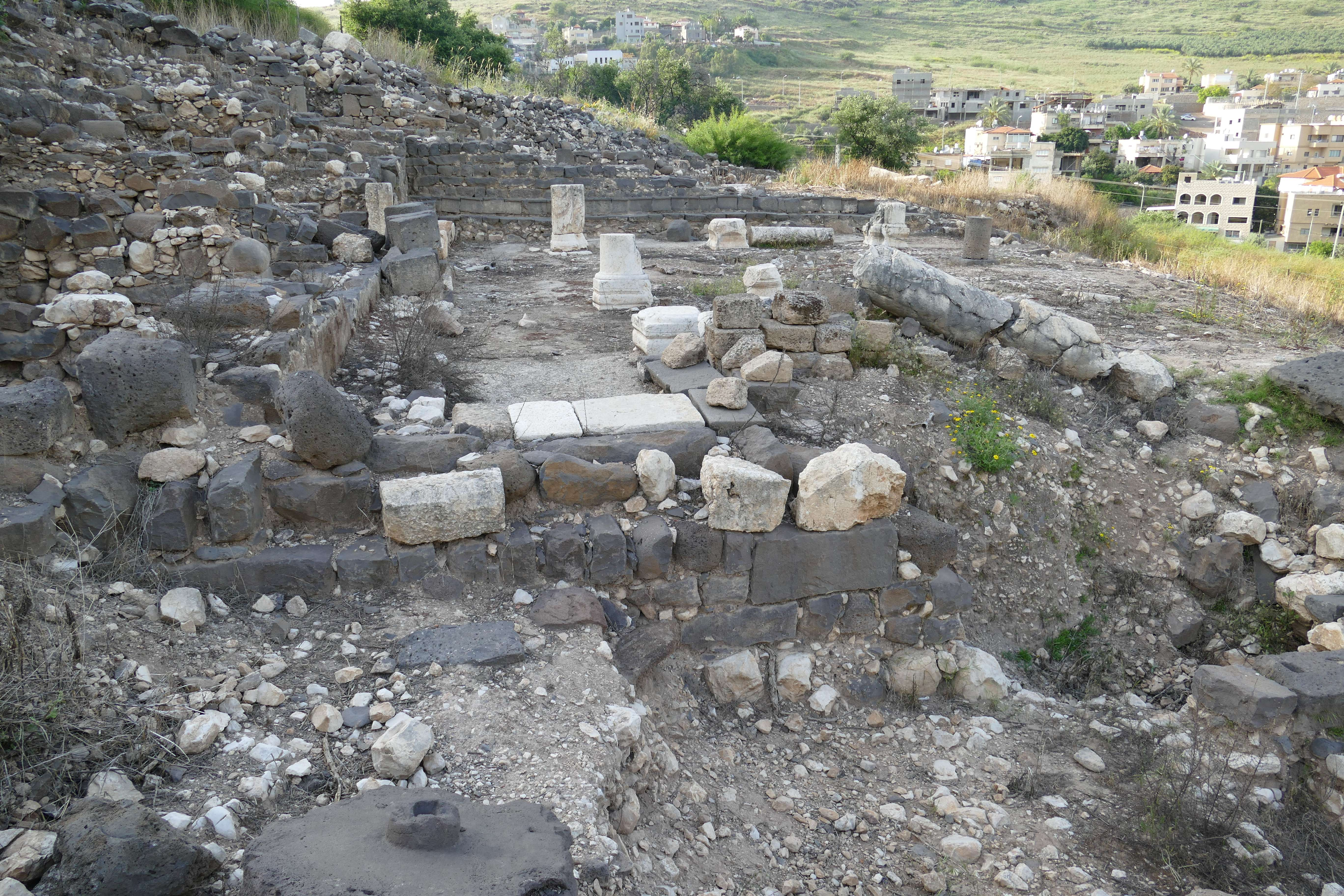
- Remains of the synagogue at Khirbet Wadi Hammam
- Interactive map of Khirbet Wadi Hammam
- 32°49′38.2″N 35°29′21.7″E
- Type: village, synagogue
- Periods: Chalcolithic and Early Bronze Age (early finds); Hasmonean and early Roman periods (first village phase); Late Roman and early Byzantine periods (renewed village)
- Cultures: Judaism
- Associated with: Jews
- Location: Wadi al-Hammam, Israel
- Region: Lower Galilee
- Palestine grid: 246/748

History
- Built: 1st century BCE
- Abandoned: 4th/5th century CE

Site notes
- Area: 3 ha (7.4 acres)
- Excavation dates: 2007–2012
- Archaeologists: Uzi Leibner
- Condition: In ruins

Khirbet Wadi Hammam is an archaeological site in the Lower Galilee, at the foot of Mount Nitai in northern Israel. It lies near the modern village of Wadi al-Hammam, close to the western shore of the Sea of Galilee. The ruin preserves the remains of a Jewish village, apparently founded in the Hasmonean period and occupied through the Roman and early Byzantine periods, with earlier traces from the late Chalcolithic and Early Bronze Age.

Excavations indicate that the village went through several phases. The first, between about 100 BCE and 135 CE, saw the construction of domestic buildings using dry-stone techniques and decorated with wall paintings and stucco, suggesting a relatively affluent community. This phase ended in a violent destruction dated by coins and other finds to the reign of the Roman emperor Hadrian, possibly linked to the Bar Kokhba revolt (132–136 CE). The settlement was re-established around 200 CE and continued into the 4th or early 5th century CE, before being gradually abandoned.

The most prominent building from the later occupation is a monumental "Galilean" synagogue with multiple construction phases that once featured an intricate mosaic floor. The mosaic, preserved only in fragments, includes narrative biblical panels depicting scenes from books such as Exodus and Judges, making it one of the earliest known figurative synagogue mosaics. Other finds include a 4th-century inscribed metal amulet and pottery from Galilean production centers that are also known from rabbinic literature.

== Geography and name ==
Khirbet Wadi Hammam is located in the eastern Lower Galilee just above the riverbed of Wadi Arbel (also known as Wadi Hammam), approximately 2 kilometres (1.2 mi) west of the Sea of Galilee. The site, which covers approximately 0.3 hectares (3,000 m^{2}), lies on a steep slope at the base of the cliffs of Mount Nitai and opposite Mount Arbel. Its position provides natural defense, as it is enclosed on three sides by stream beds and cliffs. The village's development was supported by a natural spring just below the site and by its proximity to an ancient route leading from the Sea of Galilee to the west. Two significant towns, Magdala and Tiberias, were located approximately 2 km and 6 km from the village, respectively.

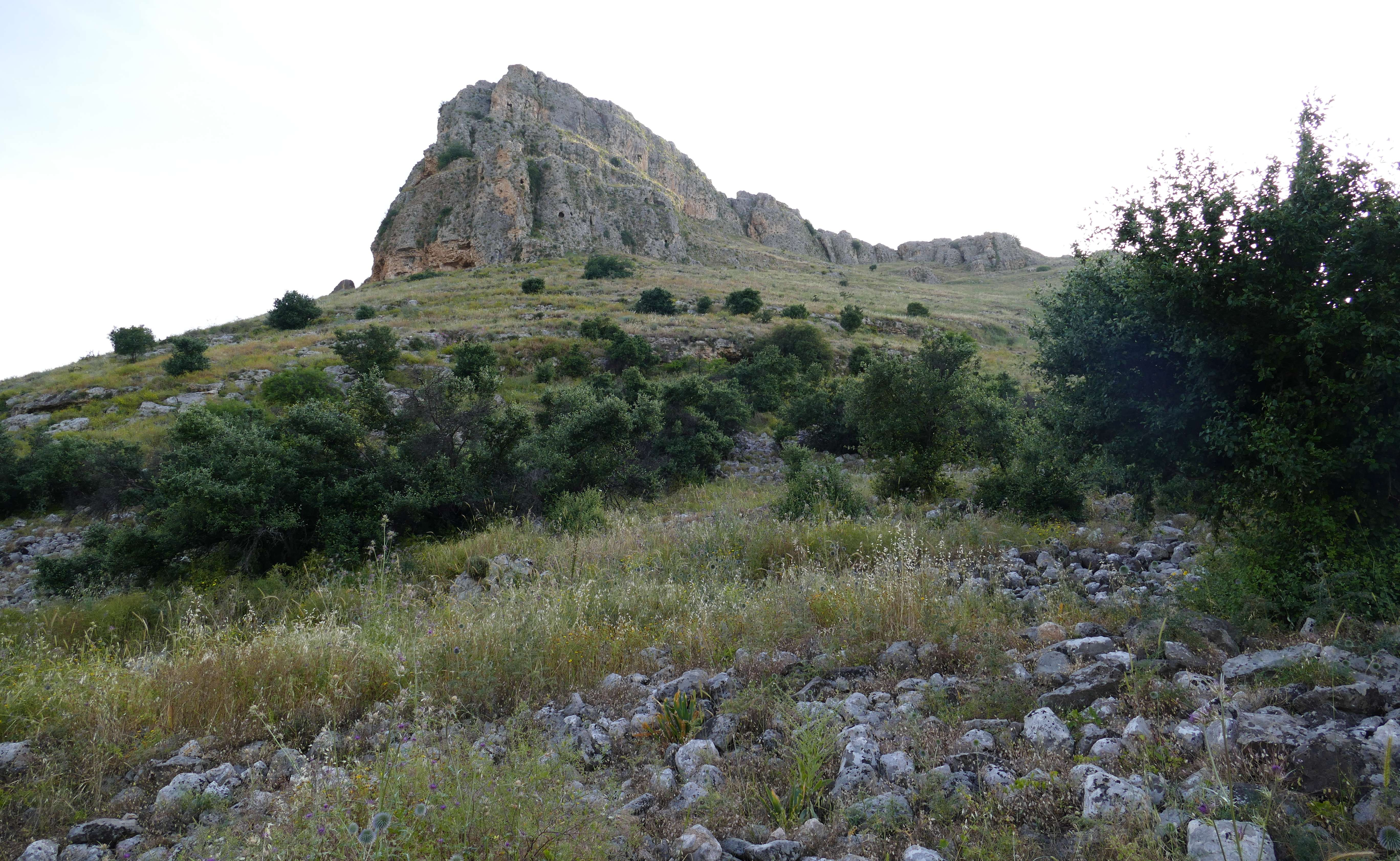
View of Mount Nitai above Khirbet Wadi Hammam

The original ancient name of the village is unknown. The modern name, first attested in the Ottoman era, is Arabic and means "the ruin of the wadi of the pigeon," referring to the flocks of pigeons that nest in the nearby cliffs. The contemporary Bedouin village of Wadi al-Hammam, located nearby, was built by families who had settled in this area in the 1950s.

== Research History ==
The ruins at Khirbet Wadi Hammam were first recorded in the 19th century by the PEF's Survey of Western Palestine, whose surveyors noted piles of stones and misidentified the site with the nearby ruin of Khirbet el-Wereidat (also known as Hurvat Veradim). In the mid-20th century, J. Braslavsky was the first to point out architectural remains that appeared to belong to a Galilean-type synagogue. Further surveys were conducted in the 1970s and 1980s by G. Foerster and Z. Ilan. In 1991, Y. Shahar and Y. Tepper proposed identifying the site with the village of Arbel known from Josephus and rabbinic literature, though it is more commonly identified with Khirbet Irbid, a few kilometers to the south. As part of the Eastern Galilee Survey, systematic surface collection and shovel tests produced several hundred sherds dating mainly to the first centuries CE, with none later than the late 4th century. Extensive excavations were finally carried out at Khirbet Wadi Hammam between 2007 and 2012 by an expedition from the Department of Archaeology at the Hebrew University of Jerusalem, directed by Uzi Leibner.

== Archaeological overview ==
Evidence from excavations at Khirbet Wadi Hammam points to the history of a village that was founded in the 1st century BCE, seemingly in the Hasmonean period (as indicated by coins of the Hasmonean king Alexander Jannaeus), destroyed in the 2nd century CE, later resettled, and finally abandoned in the early Byzantine period. During its existence, the site was home to "one of the largest villages in the eastern Galilee during the Roman period." The earliest remains at the site, however, date back to the late Chalcolithic and early Bronze Age (c. 4500–3300 BCE).

The first main phase of the village belongs to the Hasmonean and early Roman periods, from about 100 BCE until 135 CE. This was the most prosperous era in the site's history. During this time, an impressive two-story building was constructed using the Hauran dry-stone construction technique, in a manner similar to buildings at Gamla, and was decorated with frescoes, secco paintings and stucco work, indicating a relatively wealthy population. This phase ended abruptly in a massive destruction, dated by a large coin hoard to the reign of the Roman emperor Hadrian (and more specifically, c. 125–135 CE). The destruction may be connected with the Bar Kokhba revolt, the second major Jewish revolt against Rome in Judaea (132–136 CE), or alternatively with the suppression of local unrest associated with the arrival of Legio VI Ferrata in Galilee (c. 123 to 127 CE). Findings from this level include burned beam remains, weapons (including a sword, spearhead and catapult bolt), a bronze mirror and a large stone krater similar to those found in late Second Temple-era Jerusalem.

Several decades after the destruction, the village was re-established around 200 CE and continued to exist until the 4th or 5th century CE. The most prominent building from this later phase is the synagogue. The surrounding agricultural zone appears to have been abandoned by the mid-4th century CE, while the village itself was gradually deserted in the late 4th or early 5th century CE.

== Synagogue ==
The synagogue at Khirbet Wadi Hammam is a monumental building of the "Galilean" type. It is a rectangular basilica, oriented north–south, with a marked tilt toward the southeast (about 148 degrees). The interior measures approximately 12.8 × 15.4 m. The main hall was divided into a central nave and three side aisles by three rows of columns. Unlike many public buildings of this period, the synagogue was built mostly of basalt. Its foundations were laid on a fill dated to the early Roman period. Two rows of benches were built along the western, northern and eastern walls; based on an estimate of 50 cm per person, the seating capacity is calculated at about 180 individuals.

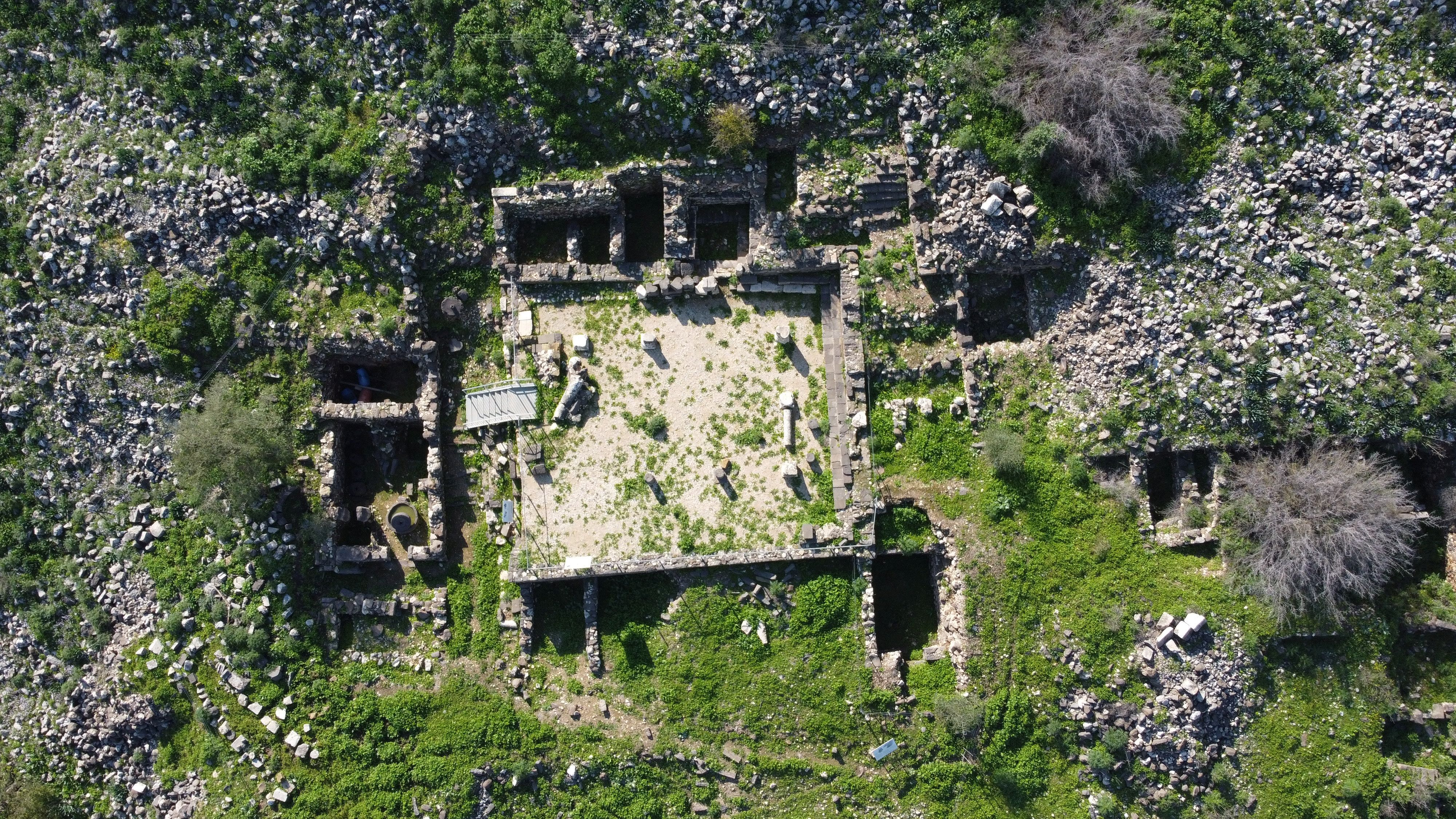
Aerial view of the synagogue and surrounding ruins

The synagogue's construction history includes several phases. According to Liebner, it was first built around 200 CE and was destroyed or severely damaged in the late 3rd century CE. The builders reused as spolia several limestone architectural elements, including Tuscan-order columns, probably taken from an earlier structure, most likely an earlier synagogue in the village dating to the middle Roman period. The synagogue was then rebuilt around 300 CE, when its floor was covered with an intricate mosaic. In a later phase, in the late 4th century CE, the mosaic was damaged, possibly in the earthquake of May 363 CE. Large sections of the northern and western aisles were then replaced with a simple plaster flooring. At the same time, a stone bema (elevated platform) was added against the southern wall, constructed directly above the mosaic. The synagogue finally collapsed, probably in an earthquake, in the late 4th or early 5th century CE, possibly in 419 CE. The latest finds on the floor beneath the collapse layer have been dated to 378–383 CE, although this chronology has been disputed by archaeologist Jodi Magness.

=== Mosaics ===
The mosaic floor of the Wadi Hammam synagogue is one of the few mosaics known from "Galilean"-type synagogues. It is dated to the late 3rd or early 4th century CE, which would make it the earliest figural mosaic so far identified in an ancient synagogue. Only about 6% of the original pavement is preserved, in roughly 30 fragments. The mosaic was divided into two main zones: a "carpet" in the nave and panels in the aisles. In the nave, parts of two concentric rings survive, together with traces of Hebrew letters that may spell the month of Tammuz, probably indicating a zodiac scheme similar to those found in several late antique synagogues. In the aisles, the mosaic was divided into about 10 to 12 panels that are oriented inward toward the nave and may have formed a continuous biblical narrative, a layout not otherwise known from ancient synagogues.

Among the figurative scenes is a construction scene (eastern aisle, panel 4), showing craftsmen at work, including carpenters, porters and masons, around a large polygonal stone structure; the image preserves detailed indications of building techniques, including ladders, scaffolding and tools such as chisels, adzes, hammers and frame-saws. Suggested identifications include the building of Noah's Ark, the Tower of Babel, the Tabernacle, or Solomon's Temple. In the adjacent panel (panel 5), an Aramaic inscription reads "Shmu(el) Safra," meaning "Samuel the scribe," apparently the end of a dedicatory inscription. On the western aisle, panel 11 preserves a battle scene, most likely depicting Samson striking the Philistines with the jawbone of a donkey (Judges 15:15–17), with a large central figure grasping smaller ones by the hair; Samson's exaggerated size corresponds to some rabbinic traditions and later Christian art in which he is portrayed as a giant, even though the biblical text does not state this explicitly. In the northeastern part of the panel, an Aramaic dedicatory inscription reads: "The sons of Simon made [donated] this panel from their own [means]". Panel 12 on the western aisle shows the drowning of Pharaoh's army in the Red Sea (Exodus 14–15): a chariot drawn by three horses is shown overturning in the waves, while a fallen soldier lies partly covered by a large fish. A city represented in the lower left corner may depict Ba'al Zaphon, a site mentioned in the Bible in connection with the Israelites' encampment near Pi-HaHiroth before the crossing of the Red Sea.

== Other finds ==
Several domestic structures were uncovered at the site, along with alleys and two olive oil presses. One of the presses is of the lever-and-weight type, indicating the use of two different pressing techniques. In a domestic building abandoned in the mid-4th century CE, a thin metal amulet (lamella) was found inside a tubular copper case. It bears five lines of magical runes and several Hebrew or pseudo-Hebrew letters. It is dated to the first half of the 4th century CE and is the earliest example of this type of amulet found in a Jewish context (apart from the Ketef Hinnom amulets from the 8th/7th century BCE).

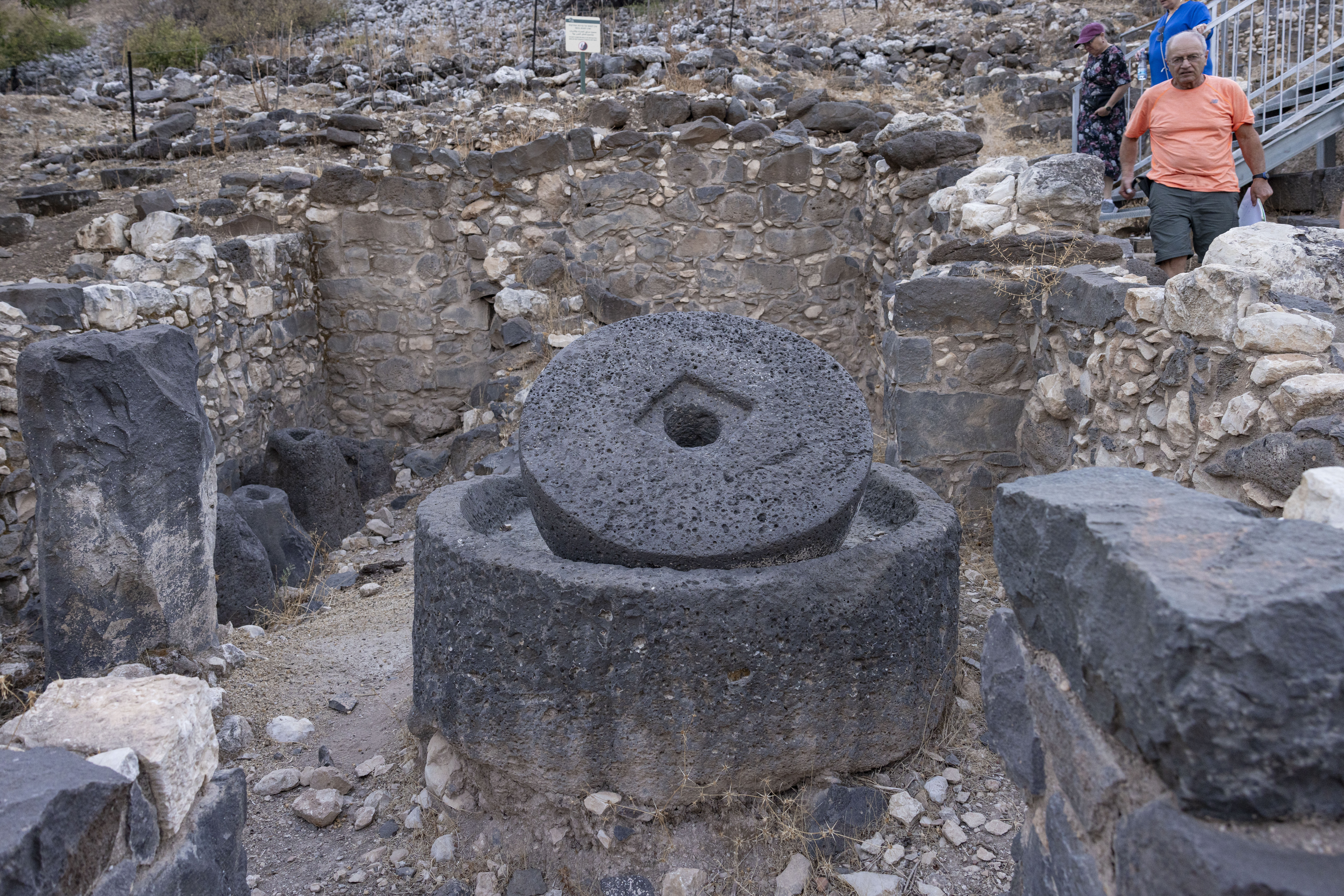
Olive oil press found at the ruin

Chemical and morphological analysis of reconstructable pottery from the Hadrianic-era destruction layer (c. 125–135 CE) shows that the cooking vessels were produced in the village of Kfar Hananya, while the storage jars and jugs were made at Shikhin. Both sites are known from rabbinic literature as major pottery-production centers.

== See also ==
- Huqoq – nearby site with an intricate synagogue mosaic
- Ancient synagogues in Israel
- Ancient Jewish magic

== Bibliography ==
- Elitzur Leiman, Rivka; Leibner, Uzi (2016). "An Amulet from Khirbet Wadi Ḥamam". Israel Exploration Journal. 66 (2): 220–231. JSTOR 44474007 – via JSTOR.
- Leibner, Uzi (2010). Excavations at Khirbet Wadi Hamam (Lower Galilee): the Synagogue and the Settlement. Vol. 23. Journal of Roman Archaeology. pp. 220–237.
- Leibner, Uzi; Miller, Shulamit (2010). "A figural mosaic in the synagogue at Khirbet Wadi Hamam". Journal of Roman Archaeology. 23: 238–264.
