= Masada: From Jewish Revolt to Modern Myth =

Masada: From Jewish Revolt to Modern Myth is a 2019 book by Jodi Magness. It describes the events at the ancient Siege of Masada in modern-day Israel, the 20th century Israeli national myth that was based on it, and the relationship of these two.

In the book, Magness argues that the earlier archeologists working at Masada, Yigael Yadin and Shmarya Guttman, gave too much creedance to Josephus's contemporary work The Jewish War (the only full contemporary written account of the Siege of Masada). According to Josephus, the defenders at Masada killed themselves when the battle was lost. Most scholars are now skeptical of this including Magness. According to Magness, Yadin and Guttman also misinterpreted their archeological findings – likely because their Zionist-nationalistic perspective may have colored their interpretations (Yadin and Guttman were involved in the creation of the state of Israel; in fact Yadin was Israel's second Chief of the General Staff). And the alleged suicide of the defenders at Masada became an important element of the myth shaped particularly by Yadin.

== Reviews ==
in the Bible History Daily, Kenneth Atkinson describes the book as a "dramatic and well-researched narrative" and wrote "The highlight of Magness’s book is her detailed description of the archaeological finds at Masada. She shows that its defenders were not Zealots, as commonly believed, but Sicarii and some Essenes..."

Jan Willem van Henten, reviewing the book in the Journal for the Study of Judaism, wrote that "[Magness] takes Masada as the point of departure for an engagement with the broader history of Judea" and "Magness states that her overview [of the First Jewish Revolt, which culminated in the siege Masada] is based on Josephus and modern scholarship 'without taking sides of in the debate about the causes of the revolt', which makes makes the reader wonder 'why'".

Michaël Girardin, in the Bryn Mawr Classical Review, describes the book as "rewarding and stimulating" and that "What we know from Flavius Josephus is condensed in a few pages, with a specific attention to Josephus’s biases and apologetic tendencies", and "It is at [Chapter 8, describing the actual siege itself] that Magness’s work shines the most... After having inquired about who the Jews at Masada were... she shows the archaeological remains of the rebels’ presence on the site, describing the housing, food, synagogue, the ritual baths (miqva’ot), stone and dung vessels that testify not only the ritual and purity concern of the rebels but also their poverty and low class origin". In the final chapter, Magness "explores the origins and developments of the Masada myth, with particular attention to the figure of Yigael Yadin, the first excavator of Masada and one of the most important promoters of its use in Zionist and nationalist discourses. She exposes the nationalist appropriation of the mass suicide of the Sicarii and, at the same time, the difficulties archaeologists face trying to confirm the story told by Josephus. In fact, [according to Magness] it seems that no mass suicide was ever committed at Masada and that the story was only a narrative embellishment. But Magness advances here with a commendable prudence, not forgetting to conclude that she is not a Josephus specialist and that 'whether or not the mass suicide story is true depends on how one evaluates Josephus’s reliability as an historian'”.
