= Benjamin Isaac =

Israeli academic (born 1945)

- בנימין איזק
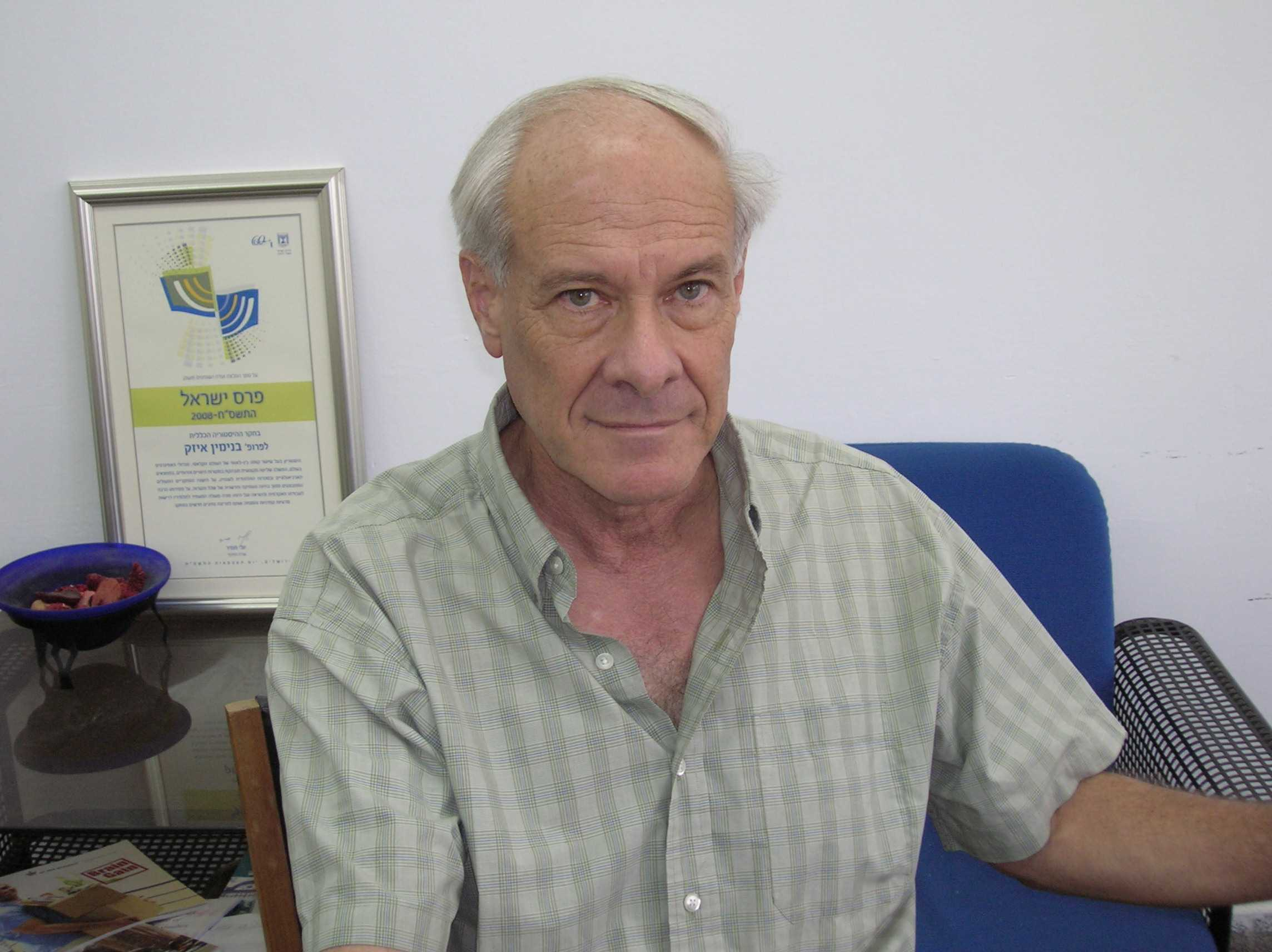
- Benjamin Isaac, 2008
- Born: May 10, 1945 (age 81); Geneva, Switzerland
- Education: University of Amsterdam
- Spouse: Ida Isaac
- Scientific career
- Workplaces: Tel Aviv University

Benjamin Henri Isaac (Ben Isaac; Hebrew: בנימין איזק; born May 10, 1945) is the Fred and Helen Lessing Professor of Ancient History Emeritus at Tel Aviv University. He is a member of the Israel Academy of Sciences and Humanities and of the American Philosophical Society

== Early life and education ==
Isaac was born in Geneva, Switzerland, where his parents settled in 1942 after fleeing the Netherlands during World War II. He grew up in Amsterdam and studied classics, ancient history and archaeology at Amsterdam University. In 1972, he moved to Israel and began teaching at Tel Aviv University. In 1980, he received his PhD (summa cum laude) for a thesis on the Greek settlements in Thrace until the Macedonian conquest. He has held visiting appointments at the Institute for Advanced Study, Princeton, NJ (twice), All Souls College, Oxford, Dumbarton Oaks in Washington, D.C., Churchill College Cambridge, the National Humanities Center, North Carolina, Harvard University and the Collège de France.

== Career ==
Isaac's research covers the period from the 6th century BCE until the 7th century CE. It deals with Greek and Roman history and with Jewish history from the 2nd century BCE onward. He has been member of a team surveying the Roman roads in Judaea/Palaestina with Moshe Fischer and Israel Roll, and of a group preparing a corpus of ancient inscriptions in all relevant languages from the region, the Corpus Inscriptionum Iudaeae/Palaestinae.

His work on the imperial Roman army, The Limits of Empire: the Roman Army in the East, traces various functions of the provincial army. It was commonly assumed that the main function of the Roman army was the defence of the frontier provinces against foreign enemies. Isaac argues that it had two different tasks, internal police functions and preparation for further expansion. Rome had an ideology of offence and expansion rather than preservation of the status quo and defence. In this connection Isaac has argued that the concept of an imperial frontier was irrelevant in Roman terms. The Empire was not a territorial concept, but one that expressed rule over peoples and cities. Another topic of this book is the question whether Rome had a "Grand strategy" as had been argued. Isaac has shown that this reflects a modern concept that could not apply to ancient reality.

His book on the ideological roots of racism argues that racism must be distinguished from other forms of prejudice and stereotypes. It is a rationalization and systematization of prejudice first encountered in the 5th century BCE in Greece as a result of the development of abstract thinking in contemporary philosophy and medical science. The concept of environmental determinism was developed at this time and has been accepted as valid until very recently. It assumes that geography, climate and other external realities impose definite and unchangeable qualities, physical and mental on entire groups of people. As such it preceded social Darwinism as an attempt to rationalize group prejudice. It played a role too in imperialist ideology because it was used to distinguish between superior and inferior peoples. These concepts were taken over by Roman authors and by those who, in later times, used them for similar or related purposes. Thus Isaac argues that the history and development of racism as an ideology has roots going back to Graeco-Roman antiquity.

Isaac is the author of numerous articles.; He is also member of a team working on the publication of a corpus of all ancient inscriptions from Judaea / Palestine. From 2015 until 2022 he was the Editor-in-Chief of the Israeli classics journal Scripta Classica Israelica. In 2021 a book was published in his honour: J. Price, M. Finkelberg, Y. Shahar (eds.), "Rome: an Empire of Many Nations, New Perspectives on Ethnic Diversity and Cultural Identity" (Cambridge University Press, 2021).

== Awards and recognition ==
- In 2008, Isaac received the Israel Prize, for history.

== Personal life ==
Isaac is married and has three children.

== See also ==
- List of Israel Prize recipients
- Archaeology of Israel
- Upper Zohar
