= Huqoq =

Ancient Jewish village and modern archeological site in Israel

- חקק (Hebrew)
- Hukkok
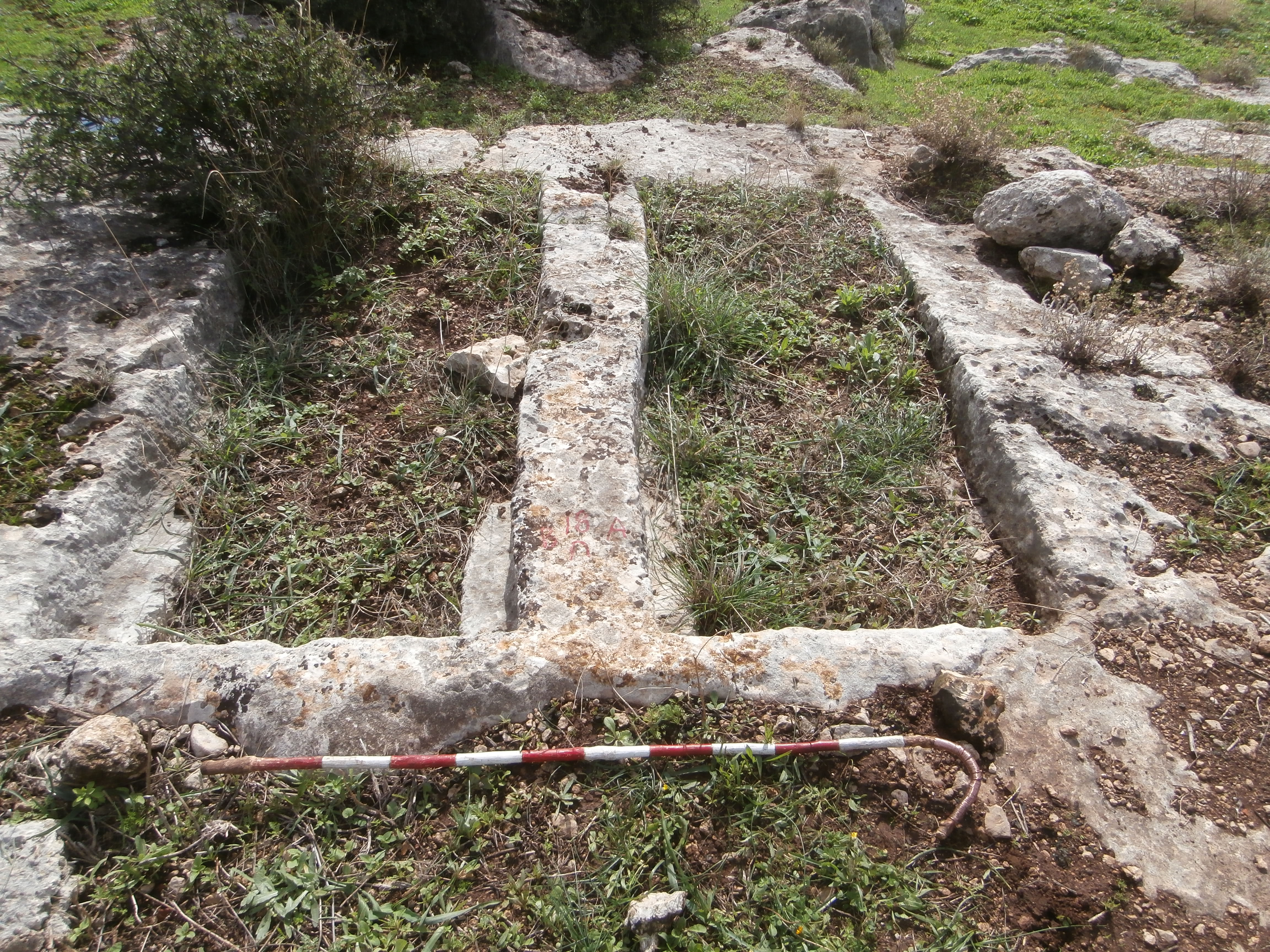
- ancient Jewish graves

- Map of Israel
- 32°53′5″N 35°28′44″E
- Periods: Early Bronze Age–Byzantine period
- Location: Galilee, Israel
- Region: Levant
- Part of: Kingdom of Israel

Site notes
- Excavation dates: 2011-2019 and ongoing
- Archaeologists: Jodi Magness (UNC), David Amit (IAA), Shua Kisilevitz (IAA)
- Condition: Ruins

Huqoq or Hukkok (Hebrew: חוקוק) was an ancient village located 12.5 kilometres (7.8 mi) north of Tiberias, now in the Lower Galilee region of Israel. It has been settled since ancient times and is mentioned in the Hebrew Bible in Joshua 19. The Palestinian village of Yaquq stood on the site until it was depopulated in May 1 during the 1948 Palestinian expulsion and flight.

Solel Boneh, the construction arm of the Histadrut, had built a Tegart fort at Hukok near the site on 11 July 1945, and later a kibbutz was established there.

Archaeological excavations revealed that a prosperous Jewish community inhabited Huqoq during the Roman and Byzantine periods. A spring supported the ancient settlement, whose monumental synagogue contains some of the most elaborate mosaics from late antiquity ever found in the region. These include detailed depictions of biblical scenes and rare non-biblical imagery that challenge previous assumptions about ancient Jewish art.

Fieldwork has also uncovered extensive Bar Kokhba hiding complexes carved by the local population during the Jewish–Roman wars, including what is described as the most extensive such system discovered to date in the Galilee. These chambers and tunnels suggest that the local population prepared for the Bar Kokhba revolt, though it remains unclear whether they actually participated, as modern scholars generally believe the revolt was limited to Judea proper, with perhaps only limited involvement in the Galilee. Around a millennium later, a Crusader-era coin hoard was hidden in these ancient hideouts.

== Name ==
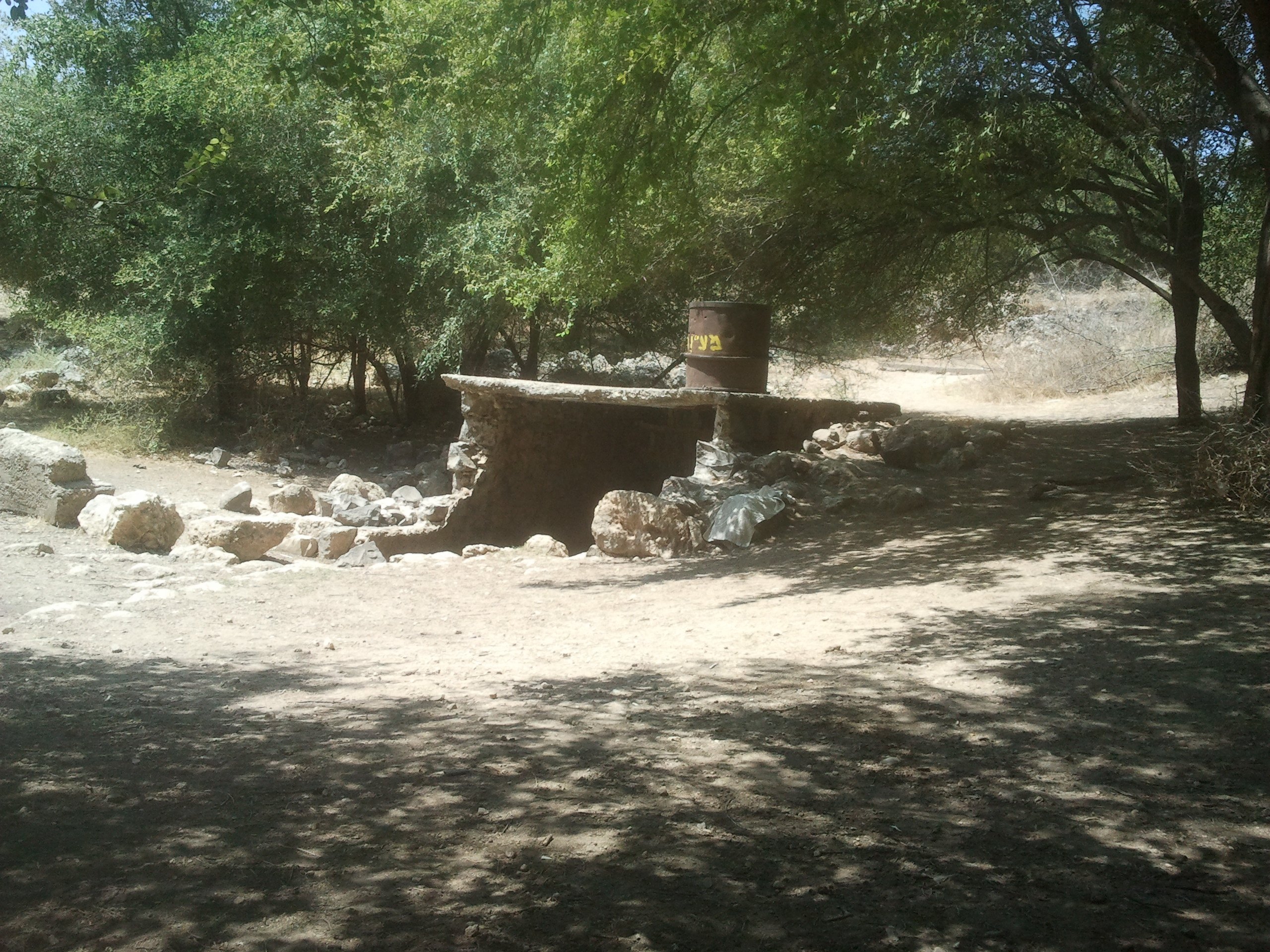
The spring, a main water source for the village

The name Huqoq is mentioned in the Hebrew Bible in the Book of Joshua and the Books of Chronicles as a Jewish city that continued to exist during the Roman period. It was also known then as Hucuca. During the Ottoman Empire there was a Palestinian Arab village named Yaquq. built on the ancient ruins.

== Archaeological overview ==
Archaeological investigations at the site of the former village of Yaquq, located near the Sea of Galilee, 12.5 kilometres (7.8 mi) north of Tiberias, uphill from Capernaum and Magdala, suggest that the site was inhabited in the Iron Age, Persian, Hellenistic, Roman, Byzantine, Abbasid, Fatimid, Mamluk and Ottoman periods. The Arab village of Yakuk was abandoned during the 1948 war and was bulldozed in 1968.

In July 2020, the Albright Institute of Archaeological Research announced a project funded by the Bureau of Educational and Cultural Affairs of the United States Department of State in which mosaics and other materials at the archaeological site of the 5th century CE synagogue, first excavated in 2012 by Jodi Magness, would be made available to the public. Initially, access to visitors would be through films, reconstructed images and interpretive material, while conservation efforts continue at the site. The ultimate goal of the project is making the excavations and mosaics open for viewing.

=== Bronze Age ===
The village site was inhabited in the Early and Middle Bronze Age.

=== In the Hebrew Bible ===
Huqoq (Biblical Hebrew: חוקק) is mentioned in the Hebrew Bible in Joshua 19:34. The International Standard Bible Encyclopedia considers the identification of Huqoq with Yaquq as plausible, although it might be too far from Aznoth-tabor (possibly Khirbet el-Jebeil, c. 3 miles (4.8 km) north of Mount Tabor) to fit the description.

=== Roman and Byzantine periods ===
The Roman-period village was large and prosperous due to the presence of a constant spring. It is apparent from both the synagogue and the absence of pig bones that the Roman period village was Jewish.

"The most extensive hiding complex discovered to date in the Galilee" has been announced in March 2024. There are some eight hiding cavities with more ramifications being discovered, connected by tunnels set at straight angles to slow down Roman soldiers hunting for Jewish rebels. The hiding complex dates back to the First Jewish-Roman War (66-70 CE) and the Bar Kochba Revolt (132-136 CE), and could only serve for short-term concealment from Roman patrols due to the small size of the chambers.

Most of the numerous finds attest to the use of the underground system during the First Revolt, and while there is no proof yet for the Bar Kochba Revolt actually spreading out to Galilee, a small number of artifacts found in this complex show that it was "involved in the preparations" for the uprising. The refuge system was revealed through community excavations with the participation of local residents, students enrolled in archaeology and Land of Israel studies, volunteers from a cavers club, and soldiers from the IDF's Samur Unit for underground operations.

The village is attested in Late Roman and Byzantine period rabbinic sources. Archaeological findings as well as the mention of Huqoq in both the Babylonian and Jerusalem Talmud prove that the Jewish village survived the Bar Kochba Revolt.

=== Ottoman period ===
The prosperity of the ancient village contrasts with the simplicity of the Ottoman-era settlement and can be seen by archaeologists in animal bones cut by professional butchers in the ancient Jewish village, and by farmers in the Muslim period.

== Synagogue ==
Among the structures uncovered during the 2012 dig were the remains of an elaborate synagogue, dated to the 5th century. Findings include limestone carvings and an elaborate floor mosaic. The synagogue's walls and columns were painted in bright colors: plaster fragments show traces of pink, red, orange and white pigments. The artistry of the mosaic, which is composed of tiny tiles, together with the large stones used for the walls, attests to the prosperity of the village.

=== Mosaic iconography ===
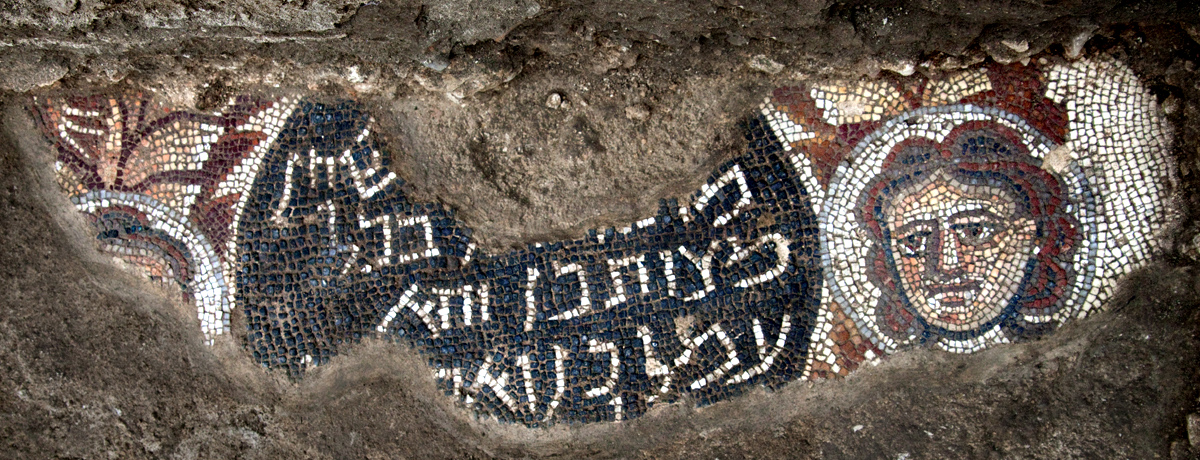
Huqoq mosaic inscription and face

The mosaic includes of the Biblical hero Samson. The figure of Samson appears twice: carrying the gates of Gaza, tying burning torches to the tails of foxes. Samson and the foxes is an episode from the Book of Judges (Judges 15:1–8). During a battle with the Philistines, Samson catches 300 wild foxes, ties burning torches to their tails and sets them loose to set fire to Philistine grain fields.

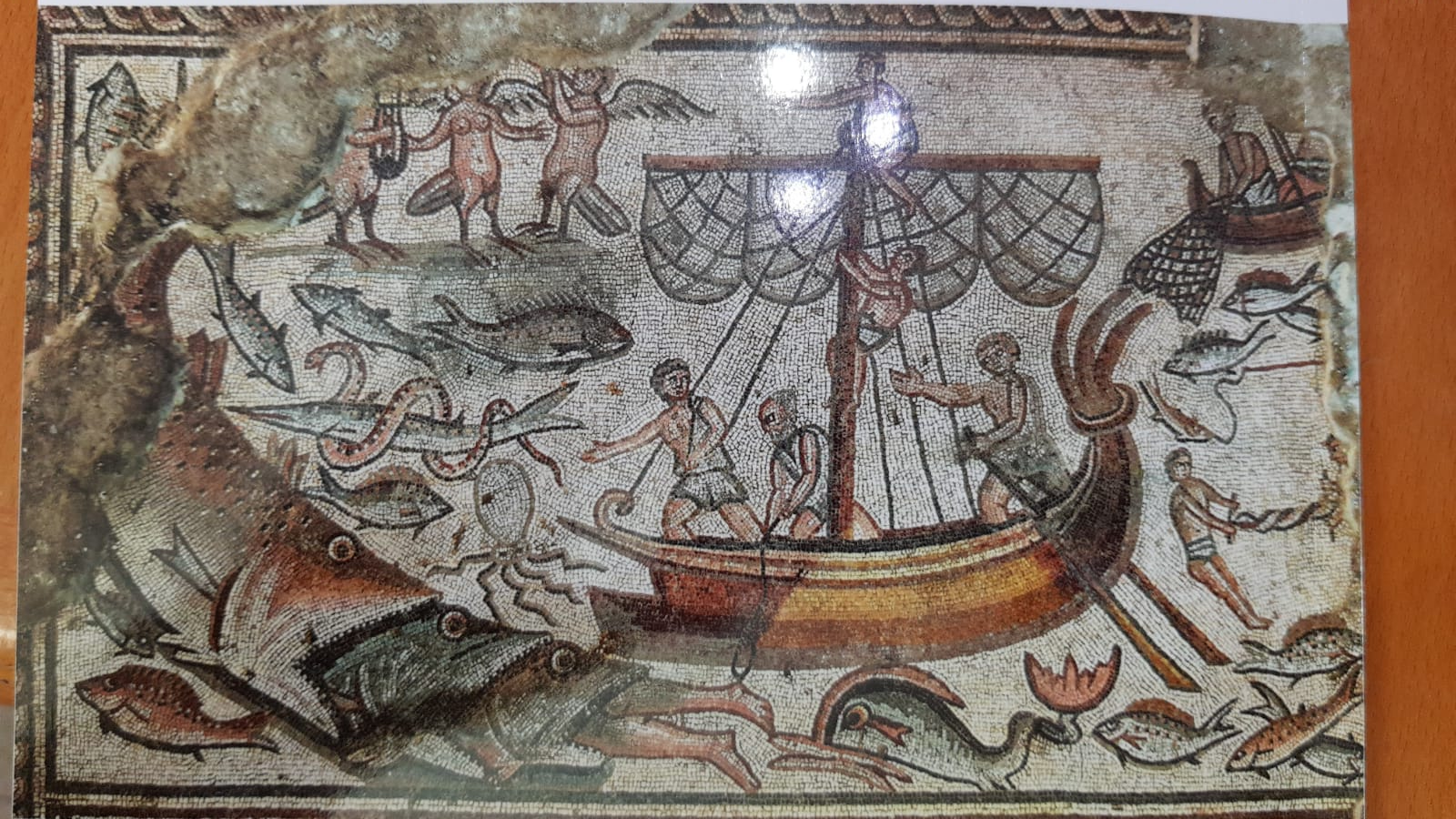
Another mosaic

According to archaeologist Jodi Magness, the discovery is significant because "only a small number of ancient (Late Roman) synagogue buildings are decorated with mosaics showing biblical scenes, and only two others have scenes with Samson (one is at another site just a couple of miles from Huqoq)."

The mosaic also shows two human faces, apparently female, flanking a Hebrew inscription promising a reward to those who perform good deeds. In 2018, photographs of newly discovered mosaics were published in conjunction with a 70-page interim report of the excavations from 2014–2017. The new publication shows that the floor mosaic also depicts Noah's Ark, The Twelve Spies of Numbers 13:1-33 and the Parting of the Red Sea, themes that are rarely, if ever, found in synagogues of the time. Other images show Jonah being swallowed by the fish and the building of the Tower of Babel. The mosaic also incorporates pagan Hellenistic images such as cupids and theatre masks, and an obscure cluster of important looking men, one of whom may be Alexander the Great, next to soldiers and war elephants. If Magness' theory is correct, this would be the only case of a synagogue being decorated with non-Biblical imagery. Another theory is that the two groups, one dressed in armour and the other in white robes, represent the alliance between the Seleucids and the High Priest, John Hyrcanus.

== Hiding complexes ==
Huqoq is home to at least three rock-cut underground complexes. This type of installation is characteristic of the defensive strategy employed by the Jewish population of Judaea during the Jewish–Roman wars. While most such complexes are concentrated in Judea proper, more than 80 examples have also been identified in the Galilee. At Huqoq, two complexes are located directly beneath the synagogue site, and another (System #2) lies on the northern slope of the synagogue hill. The latter is the largest and most elaborate complex discovered to date in the Upper Galilee.

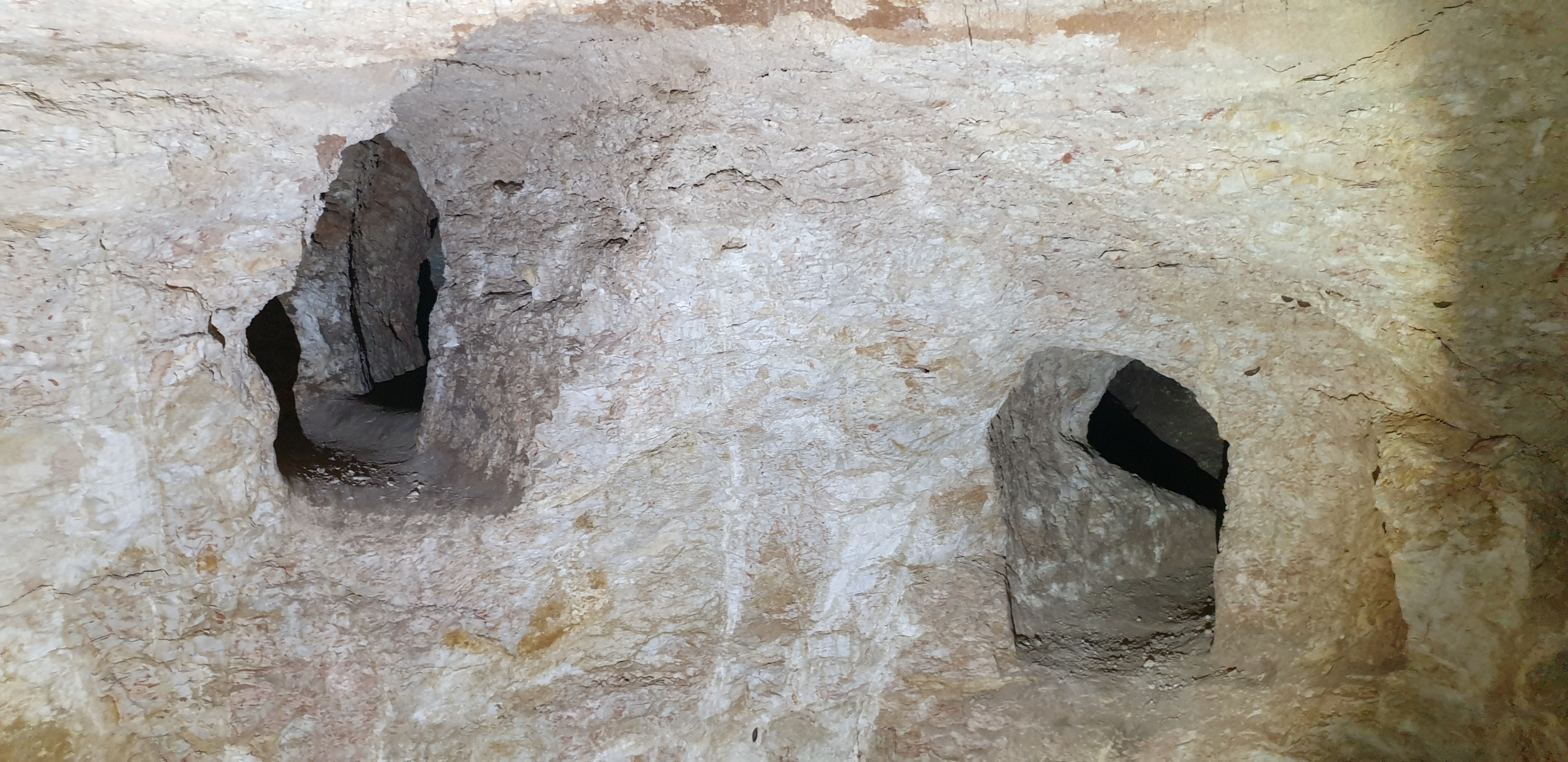
Part of the underground hiding complex

System #2 was hewn into the soft chalk bedrock beneath a hard caliche layer. It contains seven or eight chambers and spaces connected by arched openings and winding, narrow, low passages designed to restrict movement and enhance security. The complex was integrated into earlier structures: its original entrance was through a rock-cut mikveh, and two water cisterns were incorporated into its plan. To convert these installations for use as a hiding complex, the cisterns were intentionally sealed, the wall between the mikveh and the interior of the system was breached, and stairways were carved to facilitate movement between levels. Additional spaces were cut for storage and concealment. The workmanship, initially rough and later more precise, suggests two phases of construction, possibly corresponding to preparations for the First Jewish Revolt and later for the Bar Kokhba revolt.

Finds from within the system indicate intensive use during the first and second centuries CE. The pottery assemblage is typical of the period, with many vessels belonging to the Kefar Hananya production tradition, a major Jewish ceramic industry in Galilee. The absence of later ceramic types (e.g., those of the third and fourth centuries CE), together with close parallels to the assemblage from the destruction layer of the 130s at Khirbet Wadi Hamam, supports the suggestion that the complex was active during the first half of the second century CE, around the time of the Bar Kokhba revolt, and was apparently abandoned after its suppression. Additional finds, including a gem ring, axeheads, and a hoard of 22 coins (one dating to the second century CE), indicate preparation for unrest in this period, even if the extent of Galilean participation in the revolt remains uncertain.

The complexes were reused in the Middle Ages. In System #2, a hoard of 24 Crusader bullion coins was discovered, all dating from 1140–1163 CE, most minted by Baldwin III of Jerusalem. Only a few Crusader-period potsherds were found, suggesting that the complex was used only sporadically at that time, perhaps not as a regular hiding place. The hoard may have been the personal treasure of a Frankish or local inhabitant, possibly marked by two black X-shaped signs (or crosses) painted on the ceiling near the entrance to the chamber where the coins were concealed. Some tools recovered from other rooms attest to continued, though limited, reuse during the Mamluk period.

== Tomb of Habakkuk ==
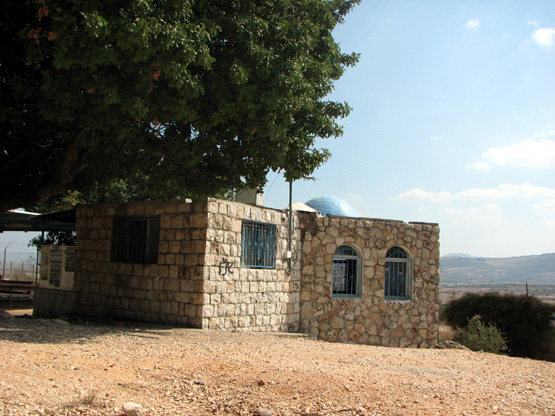
Tomb of Habakkuk

Jewish, Christian, Druze and Muslim tradition located the tomb of the prophet Habakkuk in Huqoq and it has been a site of pilgrimage since the twelfth century. The earliest mention of the tomb is a letter written by Rabbi Samuel ben Samson in 1210: "On our way back from Tiberias we went on to Kefar Hanan. In journeying there we came across the tomb of Habakkuk in Kefar Hukkok." In 1215 Menahem ben Perez of Hebron visited the site and wrote: "And I went from there, and saw the tomb of the prophet Habakkuk near a spring." The earliest detailed description appears in the book "These are the Travels" (1270–1291): "From there one goes to Ya‘aquq, where is the grave of the prophet Habakkuk, upon which there is a fine monument between four party walls."

An Englishmen named John Sanderson visited the tomb in 1601 and wrote "Then we passed by a little village where dwelt and is buried the prophet Abicoke; so said the Jews, and that the town was called Yeacoke."

A description from the 1930s states that "The tombstone. . . is built of basalt stones, about two metres wide and 1.5 metres long, covered in white plaster".

In 1981 the old tombstone was replaced by a new one, over which a small building was erected, along with a pool filled by spring water and meant to be used as a ritual bath. Jewish and Druze pilgrims continue to visit the tomb.

Seffi Ben Yosef, a local tour guide, questioned the tradition in an editorial in Ynet News, arguing that the tradition was only based on the similar-sounding name between the village and the prophet.

== Research history ==
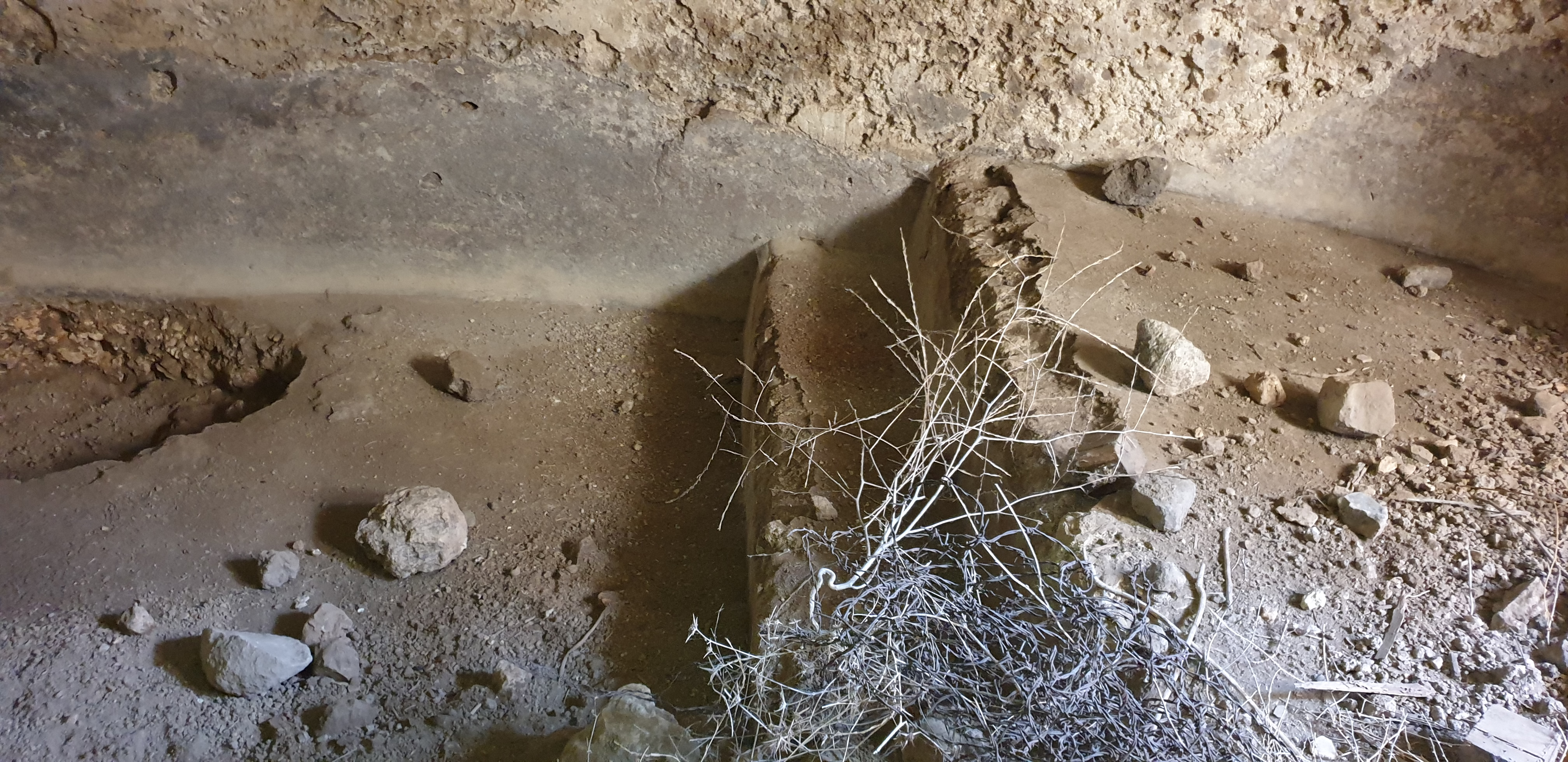
Mikveh stairs at Huqoq

A 2011 dig led by archaeologist Jodi Magness excavated several sections at the site of the former village. Magness writes: "The ancient village is surrounded by associated features, including cist graves, rock-cut tombs, a mausoleum, quarries, agricultural terraces and installations, a winepress and an olive press. Two large miqwa'ot (ritual baths) are hewn into bedrock on the eastern and southern periphery of the ancient village (see below)."

== See also ==
- Khirbet Wadi Hammam – nearby site with similarly intricate synagogue mosaic

== Bibliography ==
- Conder, C.R.; Kitchener, H.H. (1881). The Survey of Western Palestine: Memoirs of the Topography, Orography, Hydrography, and Archaeology. Vol. 1. London: Committee of the Palestine Exploration Fund.
- Khalidi, W. (1992). All That Remains: The Palestinian Villages Occupied and Depopulated by Israel in 1948. Washington D.C.: Institute for Palestine Studies. ISBN 0-88728-224-5.
- Magness, J. (29 March 2012). "Huqoq - 2011 Preliminary Report" (124). Hadashot Arkheologiyot – Excavations and Surveys in Israel.
- Magness, J.; et al. (26 August 2013). "Huqoq - 2012 Preliminary Report" (125). Hadashot Arkheologiyot – Excavations and Surveys in Israel.
- Magness, J.; et al. (10 November 2014). "Huqoq - 2013 Preliminary Report" (126). Hadashot Arkheologiyot – Excavations and Surveys in Israel.
- Magness, Jodi: “Samson in the Synagogue,” Biblical Archaeology Review 39.1 (2013), pp. 32–39, 66-67.
- Magness, Jodi: October 2013, Scholar’s Update: New Mosaics from the Huqoq Synagogue, BAS LIBRARY
