= Israel Roll =

Israeli archaeologist and academic

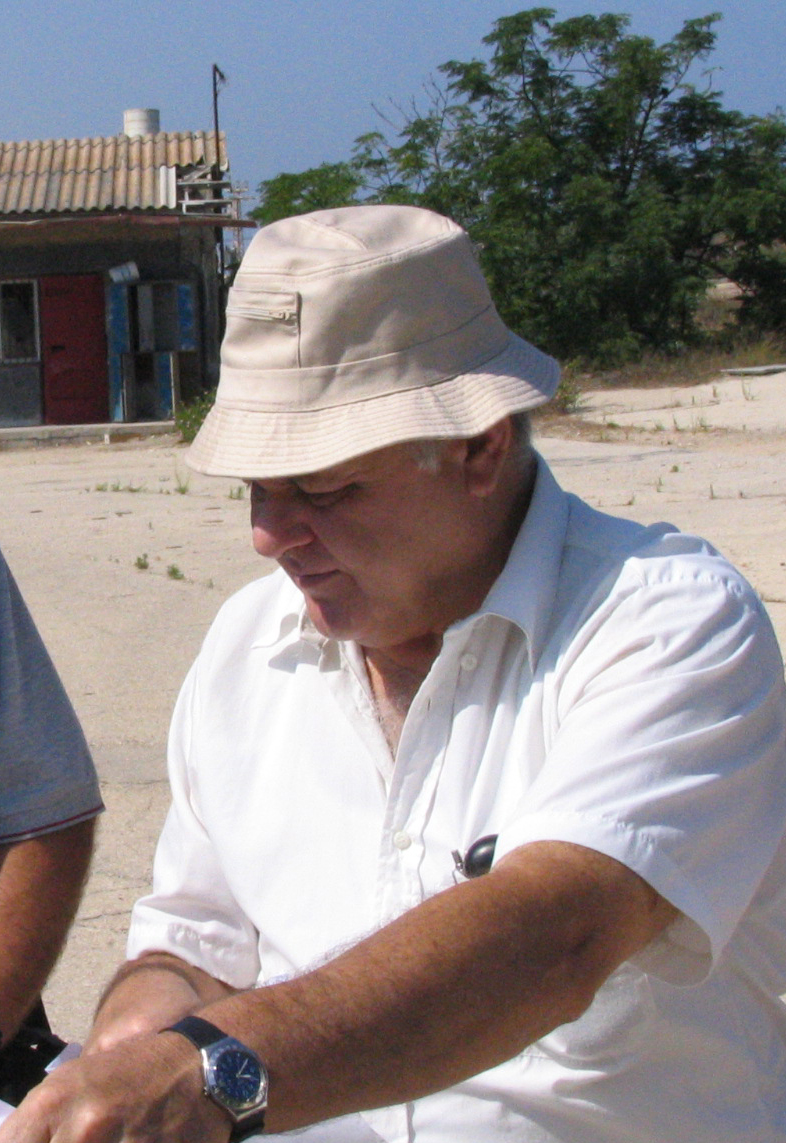

Israel Roll (Hebrew: ישראל רול; 1937 - June 2010) was an Israeli archaeologist and academic.

== Archaeology career ==
Israel Roll was the director of the Apollonia-Arsuf excavations and one of the directors of the Roman Temple dig at Kedesh. He completed his bachelor's degree at the Hebrew University in Jerusalem. His Ph.D. thesis on the cult of Mithras is from the Sorbonne.

Roll was a leading authority on classical archaeology, specializing in the Roman road system in Judea and the adjacent provinces. The Roman Road Survey was directed and published by Roll, Benjamin Isaac and Moshe Fischer. The first publication describes the Legio - Scythopolis road. The second publication, describing the Jaffa- Jerusalem roads, was published in 1996.

== Published works ==
- Isaac B.H. and Roll, I. 1976. A Milestone of AD 69 from Judaea. Journal of Roman Studies 56. pp. 9–14.
- Roll, I. 1978. The mysteries of Mithras in the Roman Orient: the problem of origin. Journal of Mithraic Studies Volume II.
- Isaac B.H. and Roll, I. 1979. Legio II Traiana in Judaea. ZPE 33. pp. 149–156
- Roll, I. and Tal, O. Apollonia - Arsuf Final Reports I. Tel aviv.
- Isaac, B.H. and Roll, I. 1982. Roman Roads in Judaea, I, The Scythopolis-Legio Road, Oxford, B.A.R. International Series.
- Roll, I. 1983. The Roman Road System in Judaea. The Jerusalem Cathedra.
- Fischer, L. M. Isaac, B. H. and Roll, I. 1996. Roman Roads in Judaea, II, The Jaffa - Jerusalem Roads. B.A.R. International Series, Oxford.
