= Hukok =

Kibbutz in Israel

Hukok: חוּקוֹק (Hebrew)
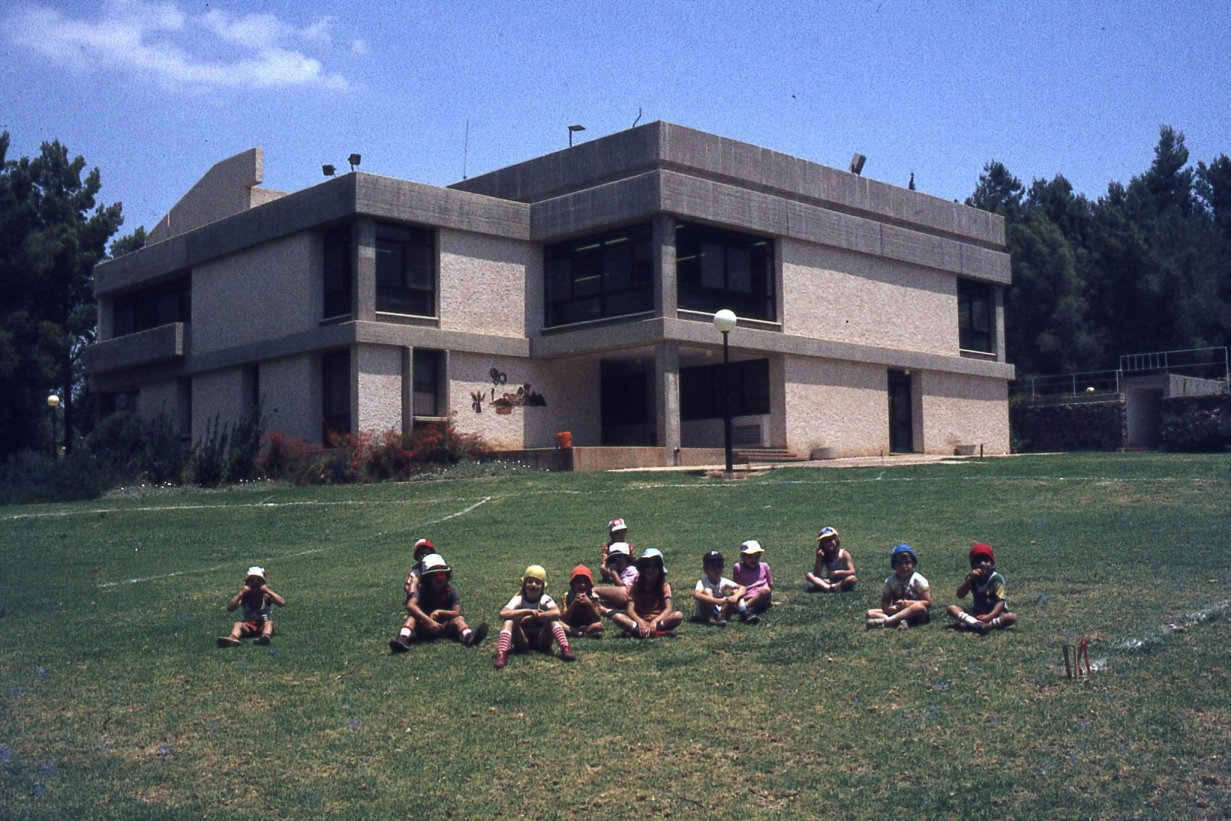
- Hukok dining hall, 1980

- Location within Northeast Israel Location within Israel
- Coordinates: 32°52′48″N 35°29′45″E
- Country: Israel
- District: Northern
- Subdistrict: Kinneret
- Council: Emek HaYarden
- Affiliation: Kibbutz Movement
- Founded: 1946
- Founder: Mikveh Israel graduates and Noar Oved members
- Population (2024): 802

Hukok (Hebrew: חוּקוֹק) is a kibbutz in Israel. Located near the Sea of Galilee and the cities of Tiberias and Safed, it falls under the jurisdiction of Emek HaYarden Regional Council. In 2024 it had a population of 802.

== History ==
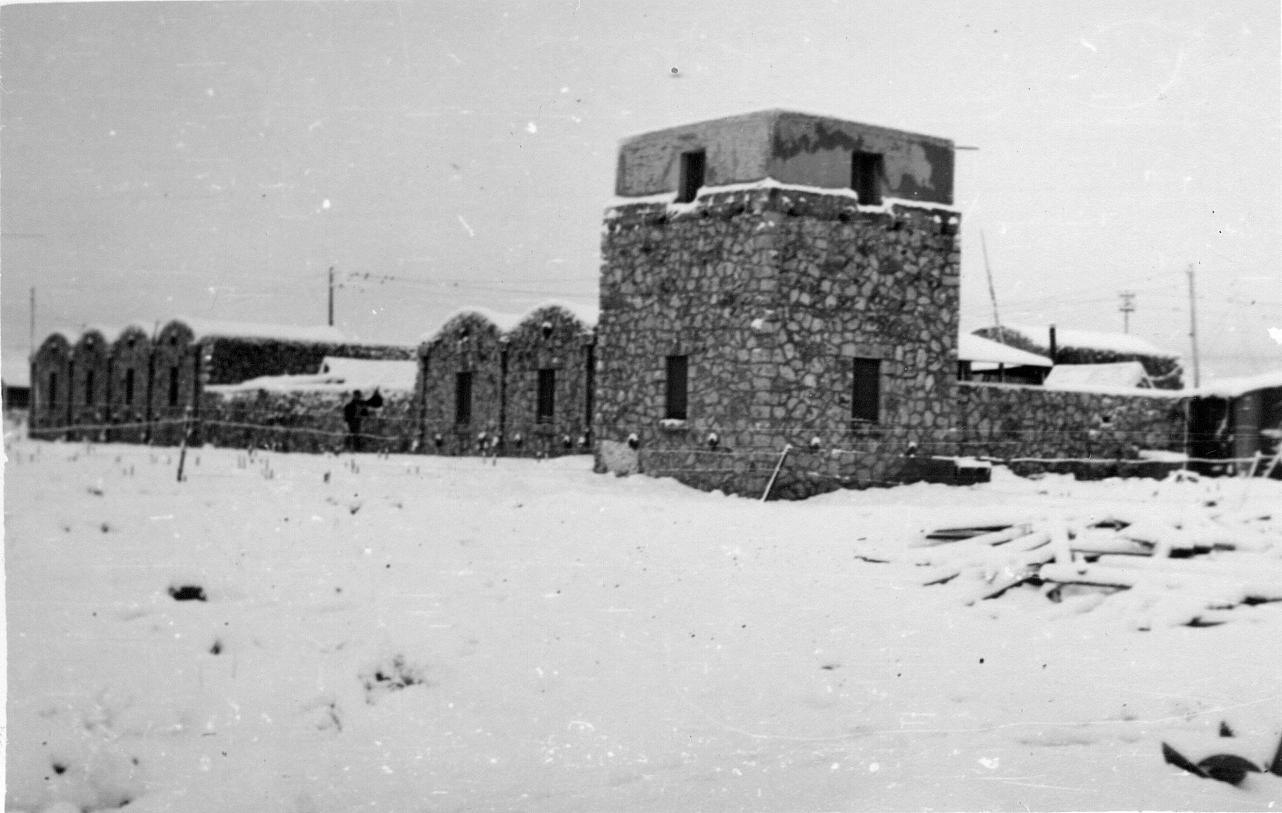
Hukok after freak snowfall, ca. 1950

In 1945, the Hukok fort was built by the Solel Boneh company as a strategic settlement post and named after the biblical village of Huqoq (Joshua 19:34), the supposed burial place of the prophet Habakkuk. It stood near the Palestinian village of Yaquq.

The kibbutz was established in 1946 by graduates of the Mikveh Israel agricultural school and members of the HaNoar HaOved VeHaLomed youth movement.

Yaquq was depopulated on May 1, 1948 during the civil war phase of the war.

After the 1948 Palestine war, the fort was used as an absorption center for new immigrants.

Between 2002 and 2003, as part of a nationwide program, the kibbutz took in 76 immigrants (22 families) from Latin America, of whom 58 remained.

== Economy ==
In addition to agriculture, the kibbutz runs a plastics factory, Hukok Industries. The kibbutz operates a private beach on Lake Kinneret that was awarded a Blue Flag for environmental excellence in 2013.

== Notable people ==
- Tuvia Katz (born 1936), abstract painter
