= Upper Zohar =

Archaeological Site

- זהר עילית, Rogem Zohar
- Location within Israel
- 31.235312°N 35.242167°E
- Type: fortlet
- Periods: Byzantine

History
- Built: 5th or 6th century
- Abandoned: 7th century

Site notes
- Material: stone
- Excavation dates: 1985–1986
- Archaeologists: Richard P. Harper

Upper Zohar (Hebrew: זהר עילית), also Rogem Zohar, is an archaeological site on the outskirts of the Israeli town of Arad. It is believed to be the site of a Byzantine-era fort and part of a Roman line of defense against desert raiders. More recent research has suggested it was constructed for economic rather than military reasons.

== Location, archaeology, description ==
The fortlet (castellum) of Upper Zohar is situated on a flat shelf of a steeply sloping ridge on the northern side of a hill known as Rosh Zohar, 'Zohar Head' ('head' as topographic prominent point), southeast of Arad. Unreferenced by ancient sources, its ancient name is unknown. It appears as Khirbet Gazza in Albrecht Alt's writings and is also correctly marked in the British Mandate-period maps, both from the 1930s. It appears again in Mordechai Gichon's writings about the Limes Palaestinae, but was only excavated between 1985 and 1986 by a team from the British School of Archaeology in Jerusalem led by Richard P. Harper. The final excavation report was published in 1997.

The site of Upper Zohar occupies roughly 26 meters squared, a square fortlet with protruding towers at each corner. It is not a perfect square, but rather than carelessness, this is caused by the desire to make use of the characteristics of the site itself. The fortlet was constructed using dense chert quarried nearby, though limestone was used for doorways and some exterior corners of the towers. The curtain walls varied between 1 and 1.5 meters in width, and were built with coursed faces both on the inside and outside. Laid in a shallow foundation, they were set using wet earth and filled with small rubble. Each corner tower was approximately 4 x 4.5 meters, and contained both a lower and upper level. Their walls were preserved up to a height of 3 meters. Access to the top of the walls was provided by a pair of staircases on the northern and southern walls. In the middle of the courtyard, which is roughly 17 meters squared, stood a cistern sunk into the bedrock. The cistern was circular, 3.75 meters in diameter and 5 meters deep. On the eastern side of the courtyard stood three rooms, although the northern and southern rooms were demolished at some point, leaving a sole room that may have served as a chapel. The fortlet's gateway, roughly 2 meters wide, stood in the middle of the western wall. At some point a wall was built from the tower at the north-western corner of the fort, past the gateway and parallel to the wall. This perhaps served as shelter for animals.

Only a small amount of identifiable coins were recovered at the site. Save for a single coin dated to the reign of Diocletian, pierced and therefore worn as a good luck charm, the numismatic evidence suggests the site was occupied from the first half of the fifth century. The largest number of coins date to the 6th century, particularly to the early reign of Byzantine emperor Justinian I. No coins date later than 550 CE. Over 43,000 sherds were unearthed at Upper Zohar, 55% of which were local cooking ware and another 42% other coarse wares, though 3% were fine imported ware, including African, Phocaean and Cypriot Red Slip. The datable pottery was dominated by sixth-century types, several known to continue into the 7th century. No example dating from earlier than the late 5th century was found, including those found within the fortlet's foundation trenches. Harper notes that 'no specifically military finds were uncovered at the site', though the final excavation report does list one spearhead end and 2 slingstones. Faunal finds include over 23,000 mammalian bones, 2,000 bird bones and a similar number of fish. 86% of mammal bones belonged to caprids and a further 12% were pig, while bird bones are dominated by the domestic chicken. Fish species found at the fortlet include both fresh and salt water fish, from both the Mediterranean and the Red Sea.

== Dating and possible use ==
Upper Zohar stands along an ancient road leading from Arabia and the Arava toward the Palestinian heartland and the Mediterranean ports. Beginning at Ein Bokek on the Dead Sea, where another fortlet stands, the route passes by another fortlet at Hatrurim before approaching Upper Zohar. Here the road merges with another track coming from the Dead Sea through the fort at Mezad Zohar, which lies to the southeast, before heading west to the northern Negev. Like these and other similar forts, it stands at a point where anyone using the road is obliged by the topography to pass close by.

Harper had chosen to excavate Upper Zohar because of its potential to contribute to the debate about the nature and date of the Roman limes in Palestine. Mordechai Gichon had written extensively about the disposition of the Roman army in Palestine, proposing the existence of defensive belt of fortifications in the northern Negev, known as the Limes Palaestinae, against marauding Saracens. Based on even earlier Judean fortifications, this line of defense was supposedly established by the Flavian emperors and refurbished and expanded by Diocletian. Gichon, therefore, regarded Upper Zohar as a Flavian establishment, part of their line of defense protecting the settled heartland from desert-based raiders.

Based on the numismatic and ceramic finds, Harper dated the construction of Upper Zohar only to the late 5th century. The initial occupation had apparently been cleaned out some time in the early 6th century, eventually falling into disuse by the early 7th century, when it was finally abandoned. The absence of a destruction layer and the discovery of the skeleton of a child under the rubble of one of the towers a suggests the cause may have been an earthquake.

Archaeologist Thomas S. Parker has suggested that the cessation of military activity at the site in the 6th century may have resulted from the demobilization of the Limitanei, attributed to emperor Justinian by Procopius. The fortlet may have been initially garrisoned by a detachment from one of the units listed in the Notitia Dignitatum, which policed the road. There were, after all, no real police forces at the time, the activities of which were carried out by the military. Later, these were replaced by some local arrangement, eventually leading to its neglect and eventual abandonment.

Jodi Magness and Benjamin Isaac disagree with Parker, noting that Justinian's reign may have, in fact, witnessed a surge in military building activity in the region. According to Isaac, however, nothing justifies describing Upper Zohar as any part of a system of defense. Although a structure of this type is assumed to have had a military role, this is not necessarily the case, as is evident by the paucity of military finds. Isaac's criticism of Gichon's theories regarding the Roman deployment in southern Palestine is shared by other scholars as well. Magness marks the homogeneity of the ceramic finds at Upper Zohar, the vast majority of which post-date the mid-6th century, as indicative that Upper Zohar was only occupied in the middle of that century. It could not have been part of any system of defence, often attributed to Diocletian's military and administrative reforms. Like other forts in the region, Upper Zohar is too small to support any sizeable garrison. These were apparently not intended to provide defense against a strong opponent. Rather, they were police posts and lookouts protecting travelers, pilgrims and trade along the road. These forts are evidence for a concentrated effort on the part of the government to police the local road system. Upper Zohar and other such forts may have been constructed on a local rather than imperial initiative, with the purpose of safeguarding the road. They were likely constructed for economic rather than military reasons.

== See also ==
- Archaeology of Israel
