= Jodi Magness =

American archaeologist and scholar of ancient Judaism

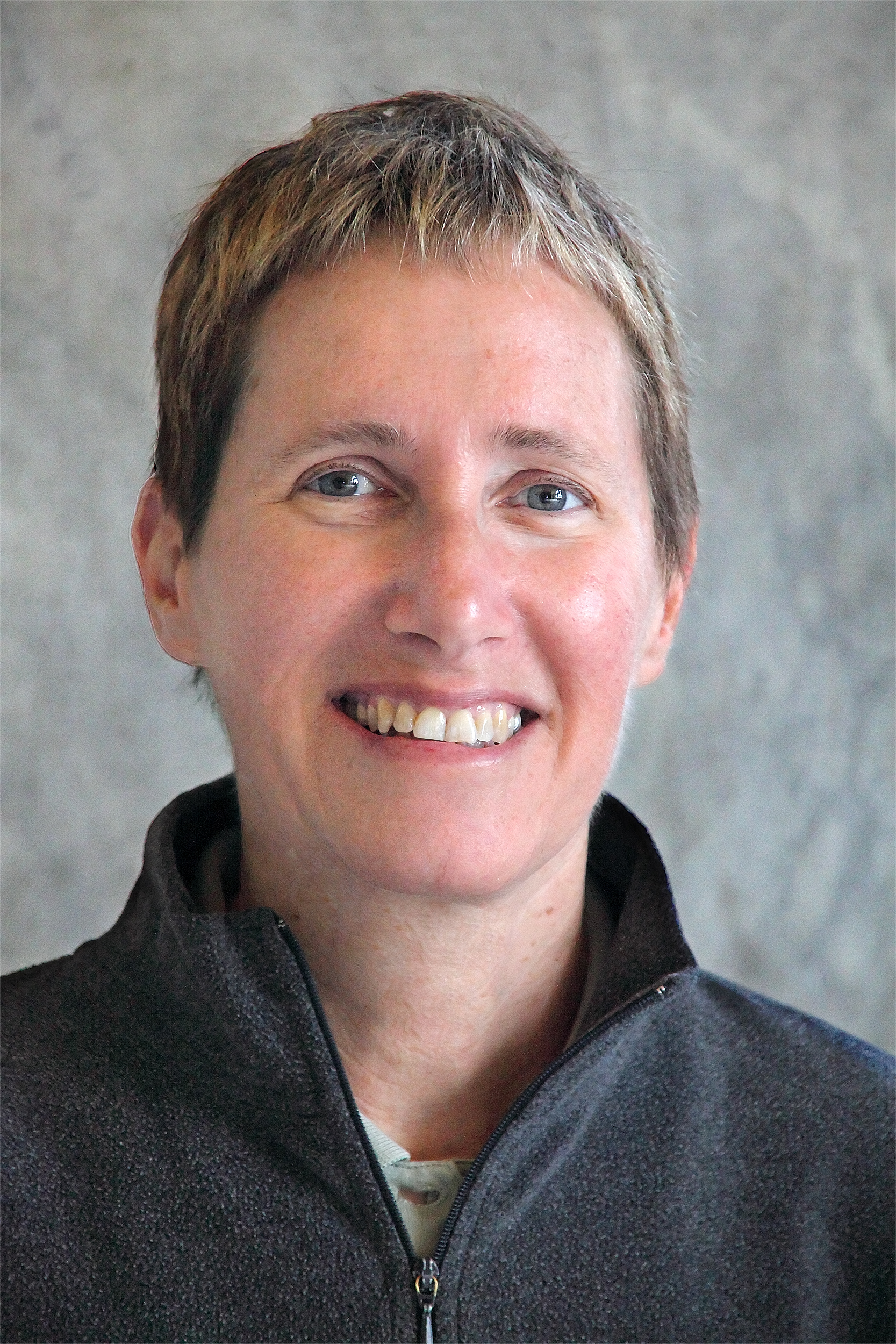
- Education: Hebrew University of Jerusalem; University of Pennsylvania
- Occupations: Professor, archaeologist
- Employer: University of North Carolina at Chapel Hill
- Title: Kenan Distinguished Professor for Teaching Excellence in Early Judaism
- Website: www.jodimagness.org

Jodi Magness (born September 19, 1956) is an American archaeologist and scholar of religion. She serves as the Kenan Distinguished Professor for Teaching Excellence in Early Judaism at the University of North Carolina at Chapel Hill. She previously taught at Tufts University.

== Early life and education ==
Magness received her B.A. in Archaeology and History from the Hebrew University of Jerusalem (1977), and her Ph.D. in Classical Archaeology from the University of Pennsylvania (1989).

== Academic career ==
From 1990 to 1992, Magness was Mellon Post-Doctoral Fellow in Syro-Palestinian Archaeology at the Center for Old World Archaeology and Art at Brown University. She also taught at Tufts University before joining the University of North Carolina at Chapel Hill, where she is Kenan Distinguished Professor for Teaching Excellence in Early Judaism.

Magness has participated in 20 different excavations in Israel and Greece. She co-directed the 1995 excavations of the Roman siege works at Masada. From 1997 to 1999 she co-directed excavations at Khirbet Yattir in Israel. Since 2003 Professor Magness has been the co-director of the excavations in the late Roman fort at Yotvata, Israel. In 2011 she began to dig at Huqoq.

Magness is a popular professor whose "unique teaching style of using vivid anecdotes [keeps] students on the edge of their seats".

Magness has been a guest on the National Geographic Channel's The Story of God with Morgan Freeman, a documentary television series exploring religious beliefs across cultures around the world.

=== Criticism of The Lost Tomb of Jesus ===
Magness has strongly criticized the 2007 docudrama The Lost Tomb of Jesus, directed by Simcha Jacobovici and executive-produced by James Cameron. She explained that "at the time of Jesus, wealthy families buried their dead in tombs cut by hand from solid rock, placing the bones in niches in the walls and later transferring them to ossuaries." In contrast, she said that "Jesus came from a poor family that, like most Jews of the time, probably buried their dead in ordinary graves", and that "if Jesus' family had been wealthy enough to afford a rock-cut tomb, it would have been in Nazareth, not Jerusalem." She also noted that the names on the Talpiyot ossuaries "indicate that the tomb belonged to a family from Judea, the area around Jerusalem, where people were known by their first name and father's name", and that "as Galileans, Jesus and his family members would have used their first name and hometown".

== Honors and awards ==
She was American Academy of Arts and Sciences Fellow of 2019.

== Books ==
Jodi Magness has published the following books:

- Jerusalem Ceramic Chronology circa 200–800 C.E. (Sheffield: Sheffield Academic Press, 1993)
- Hesed ve-Emet: Studies in Honor of Ernest S. Frerichs (co-edited with Seymour Gitin; Atlanta: Scholars Press, 1998)
- The Archaeology of Qumran and the Dead Sea Scrolls (Grand Rapids, MI: Eerdmans, 2002; 2nd ed. 2021) – winner of the 2003 Biblical Archaeology Society's Award for Best Popular Book in Archaeology and an "Outstanding Academic Book for 2003" by Choice magazine
- The Archaeology of the Early Islamic Settlement in Palestine (Winona Lake, IN: Eisenbrauns, 2003) – recipient of the 2006 Irene Levi-Sala Book Prize in the category of non-fiction on the archaeology of Israel
- Debating Qumran: Collected Essays on Its Archaeology (Leuven: Peeters, 2004)
- Stone and Dung, Oil and Spit: Jewish Daily Life in the Time of Jesus (Grand Rapids, MI: Eerdmans, 2011)
- The Archaeology of the Holy Land: From the Destruction of Solomon's Temple to the Muslim Conquest (Cambridge: Cambridge University Press, 2012)
- The 2003–2007 Excavations in the Late Roman Fort at Yotvata (co-authored with Gwyn Davies; Winona Lake, IN: Eisenbrauns, 2015)
- Masada: From Jewish Revolt to Modern Myth (Princeton University Press, 2019) – finalist for the 2019 National Jewish Book Award in the category of History (Gerrard and Ella Berman Memorial Award)
- Ancient Synagogues in Palestine: A Reevaluation Nearly a Century After Sukenik's Schweich Lectures. The Schweich Lectures of the British Academy 2022 (London: The British Academy/Oxford University Press, 2024)
- Jerusalem Through the Ages: From Its Beginnings to the Crusades (New York: Oxford University Press, 2024)

== See also ==
- Upper Zohar
