= Yeshiva =

Jewish educational institution for Torah study

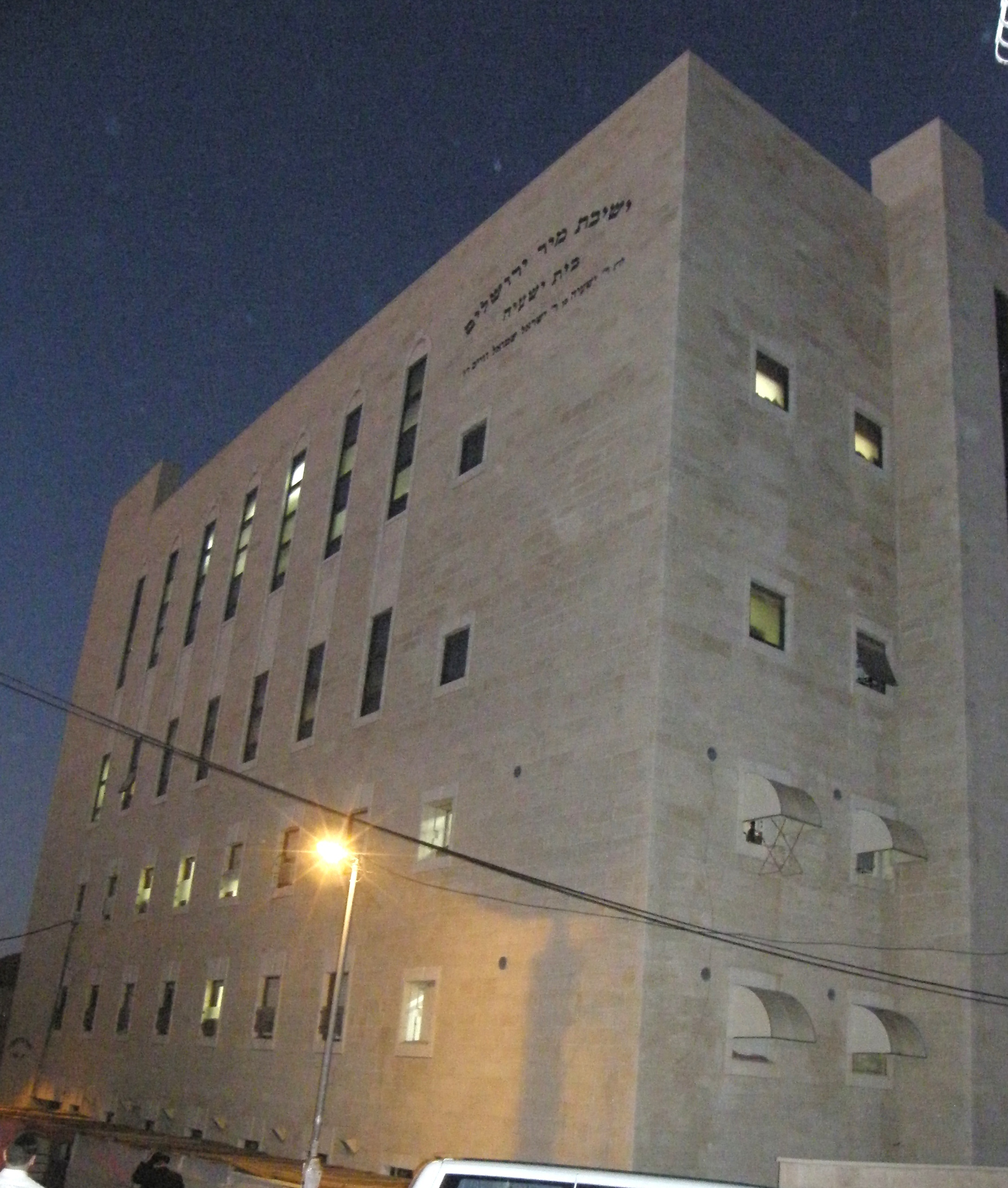
Mir Yeshiva in Jerusalem, one of the two largest yeshivot in the world

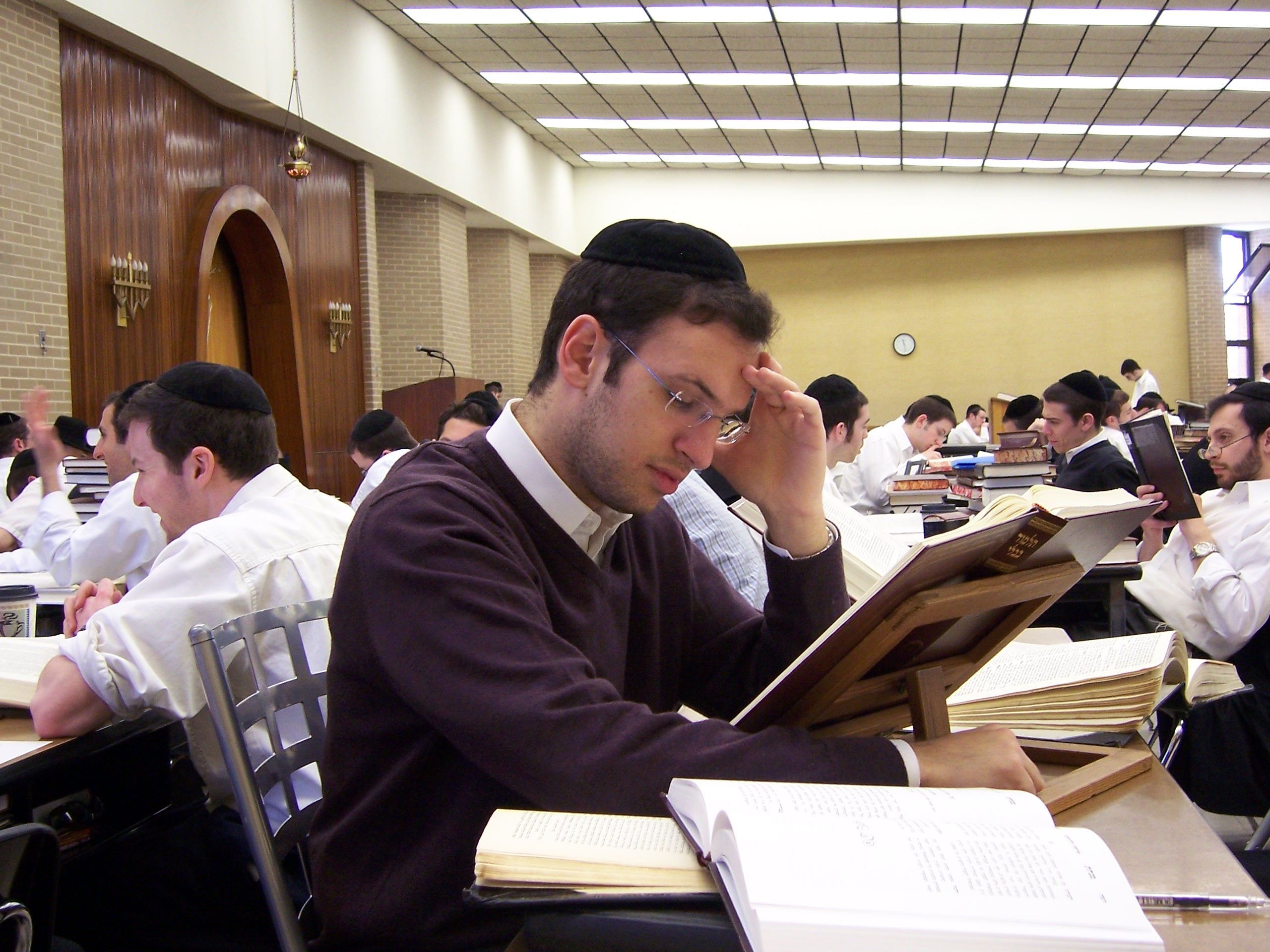
A typical bet midrash, Yeshivas Ner Yisroel in Baltimore

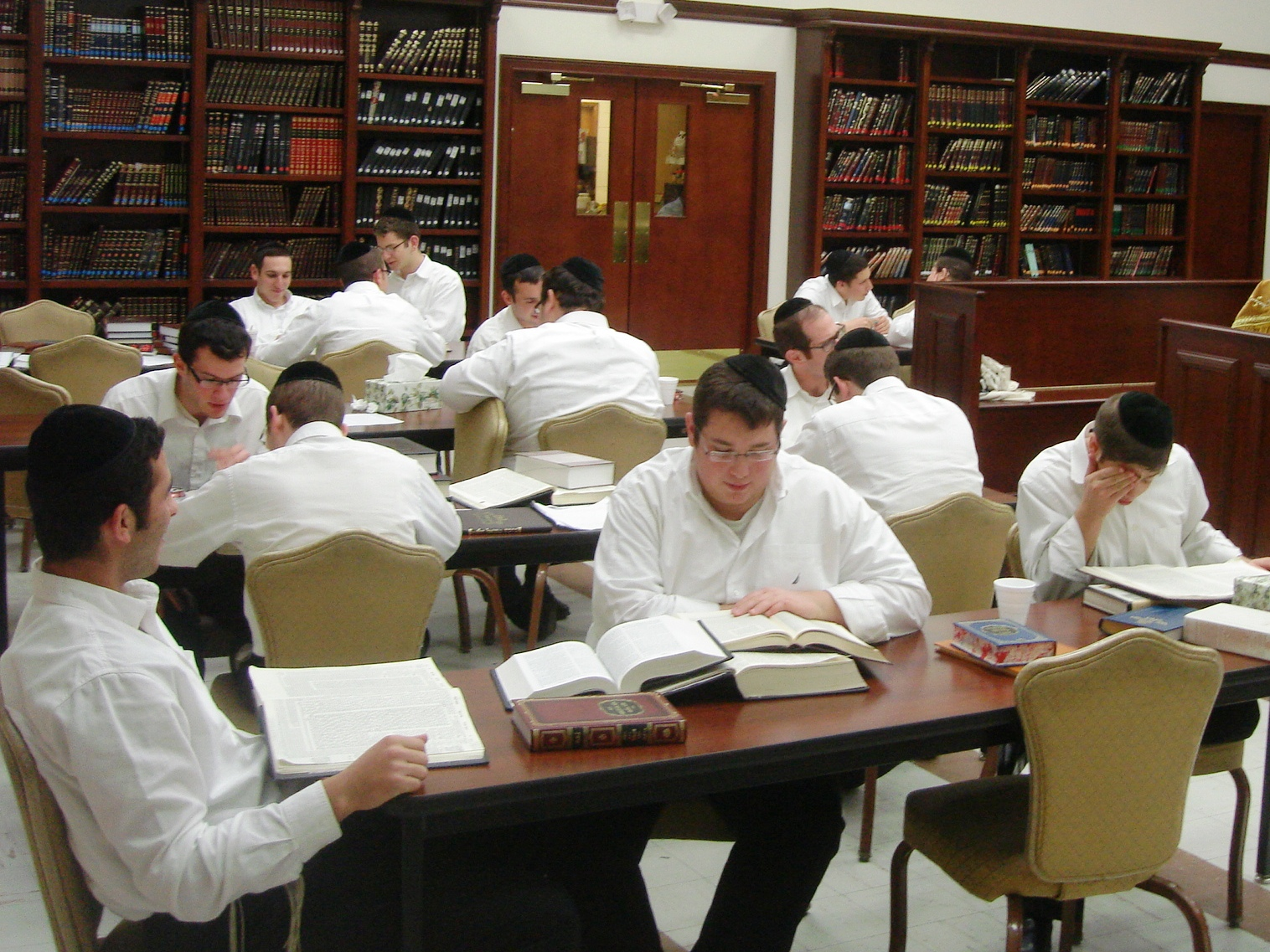
Chavrusas in study at Yeshiva Gedola of Carteret

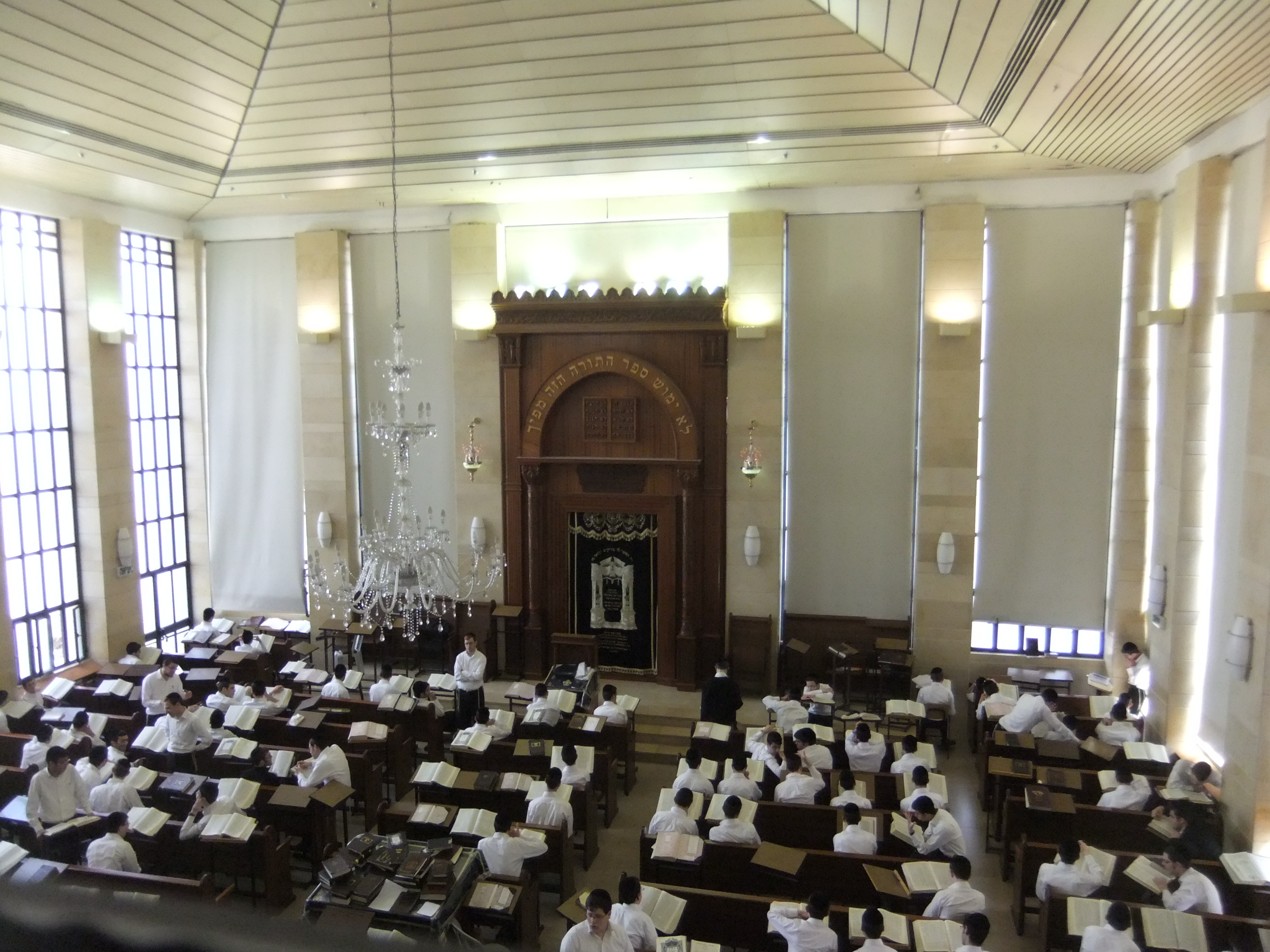
Morning seder at Or-Yisrael, a yeshiva founded by the Chazon Ish

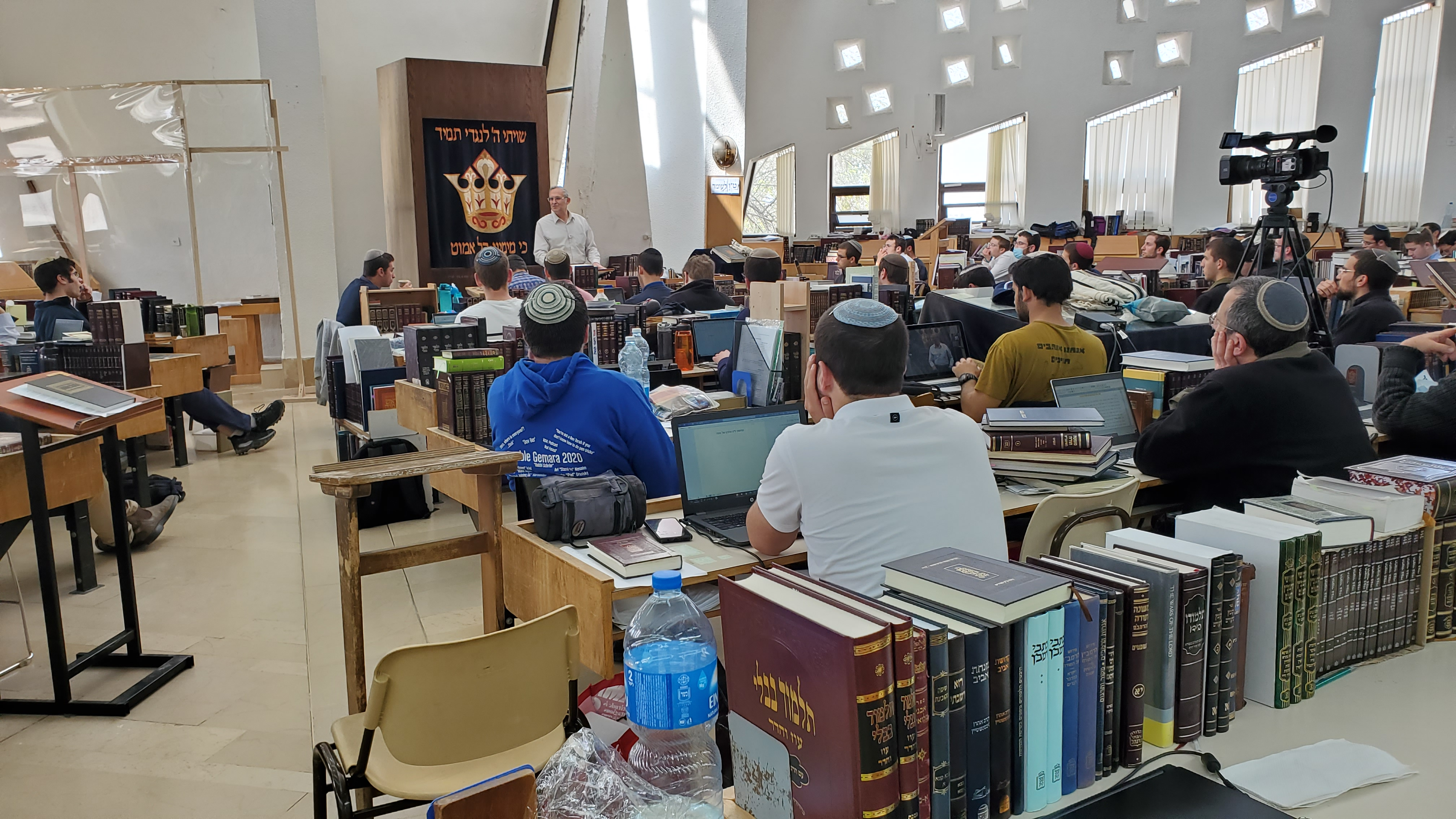
Shiur by Rav Mosheh Lichtenstein in memory of Rav Aharon Lichtenstein at Yeshivat Har Etzion, a Hesder yeshiva

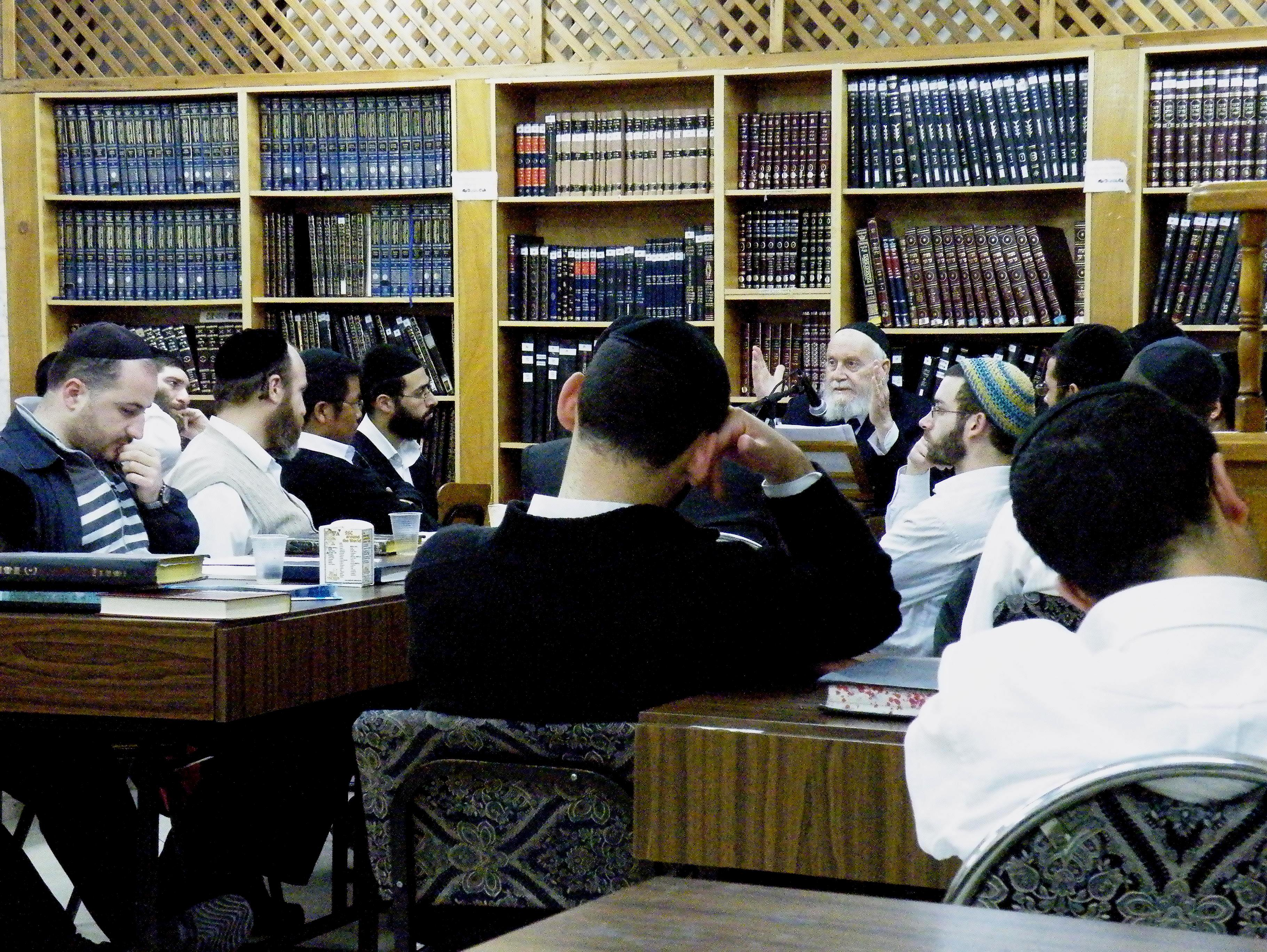
Rabbinical students in shiur in Jerusalem

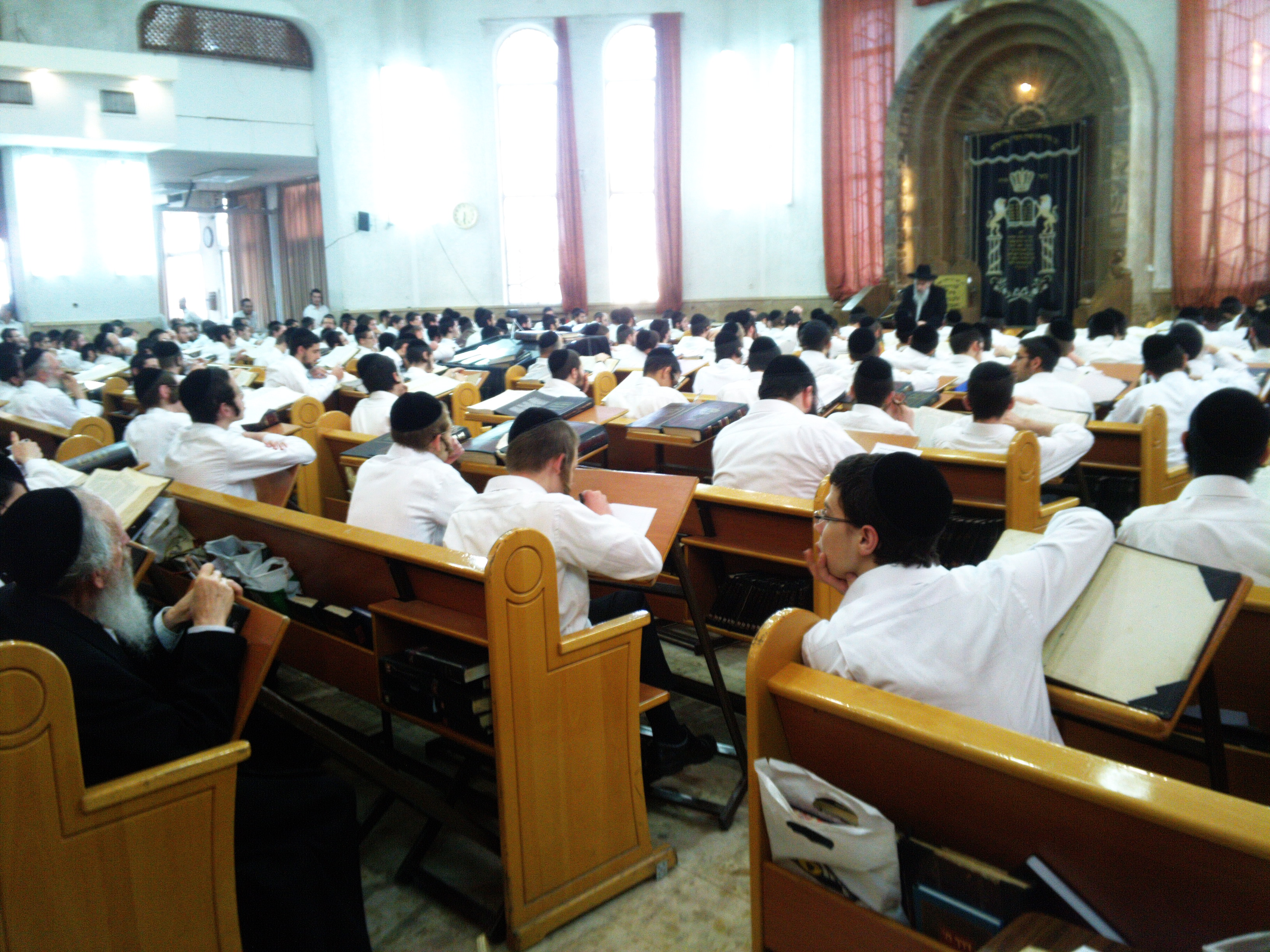
Shiur klali at Slabodka Yeshiva

A yeshiva (/jəˈʃiːvə/; Hebrew: יְשִיבָה, lit. 'sitting'; pl. יְשִיבוֹת, yeshivot) is a traditional Jewish educational institution focused on the study of Rabbinic literature, primarily the Talmud and halacha (Jewish law), while Torah and Jewish philosophy are studied in parallel. The studying is usually done through daily shiurim (lectures or classes) as well as in study pairs called chavrusas (Aramaic for 'friendship' or 'companionship'). Chavrusa-style learning is one of the unique features of the yeshiva.

In the United States and Israel, different levels of yeshiva education have different names. In the U.S., elementary-school students enroll in a cheder, post-bar mitzvah-age students learn in a mesivta, and undergraduate-level students learn in a beit midrash or yeshiva gedola (Hebrew: יְשִיבָה גְדוֹלָה, lit. 'large yeshiva' or 'great yeshiva'). In Israel, elementary-school students enroll in a Talmud Torah or cheder, post-bar mitzvah-age students learn in a yeshiva ketana (Hebrew: יְשִיבָה קְטַנָּה, lit. 'small yeshiva' or 'minor yeshiva'), and high-school-age students learn in a yeshiva gedola. A kollel is a yeshiva for married men, in which it is common to pay a token stipend to its students. Students of Lithuanian and Hasidic yeshivot gedolot (plural of yeshiva gedola) usually learn in yeshiva until they get married.

Historically, yeshivas were for men only. Today, all non-Orthodox yeshivas are open to women. Although there are separate schools for Orthodox women and girls, known as midrasha or "seminary", these do not follow the same structure or curriculum as the traditional yeshiva for boys and men.

== Etymology ==
Alternate spellings and names include yeshivah; metivta and mesivta (Imperial Aramaic: מתיבתא methivta); beth midrash; Talmudical academy, rabbinical academy and rabbinical school. The word yeshiva is applied to the activity of learning in class, and hence to a learning "session."

The transference in meaning of the term from the learning session to the institution itself appears to have occurred by the time of the Talmudic Academies in Babylonia, Sura and Pumbedita, which were known as shte ha-yeshivot (the two colleges).

== History ==
=== Origins ===
The Mishnah tractate Megillah contains the law that a town can only be called a city if it supports ten men (batlanim) to make up the required quorum for communal prayers. Similarly, every beth din ('house of judgement') was attended by a number of pupils up to three times the size of the court (Mishnah, tractate Sanhedrin). According to the Talmud, adults generally took two months off every year to study, these being Elul and Adar, the months preceding the pilgrimage festivals of Sukkot and Pesach (called Yarḥei Kalla, Aramaic for 'Months of Kallah'). The rest of the year, they worked.

=== Geonic period ===
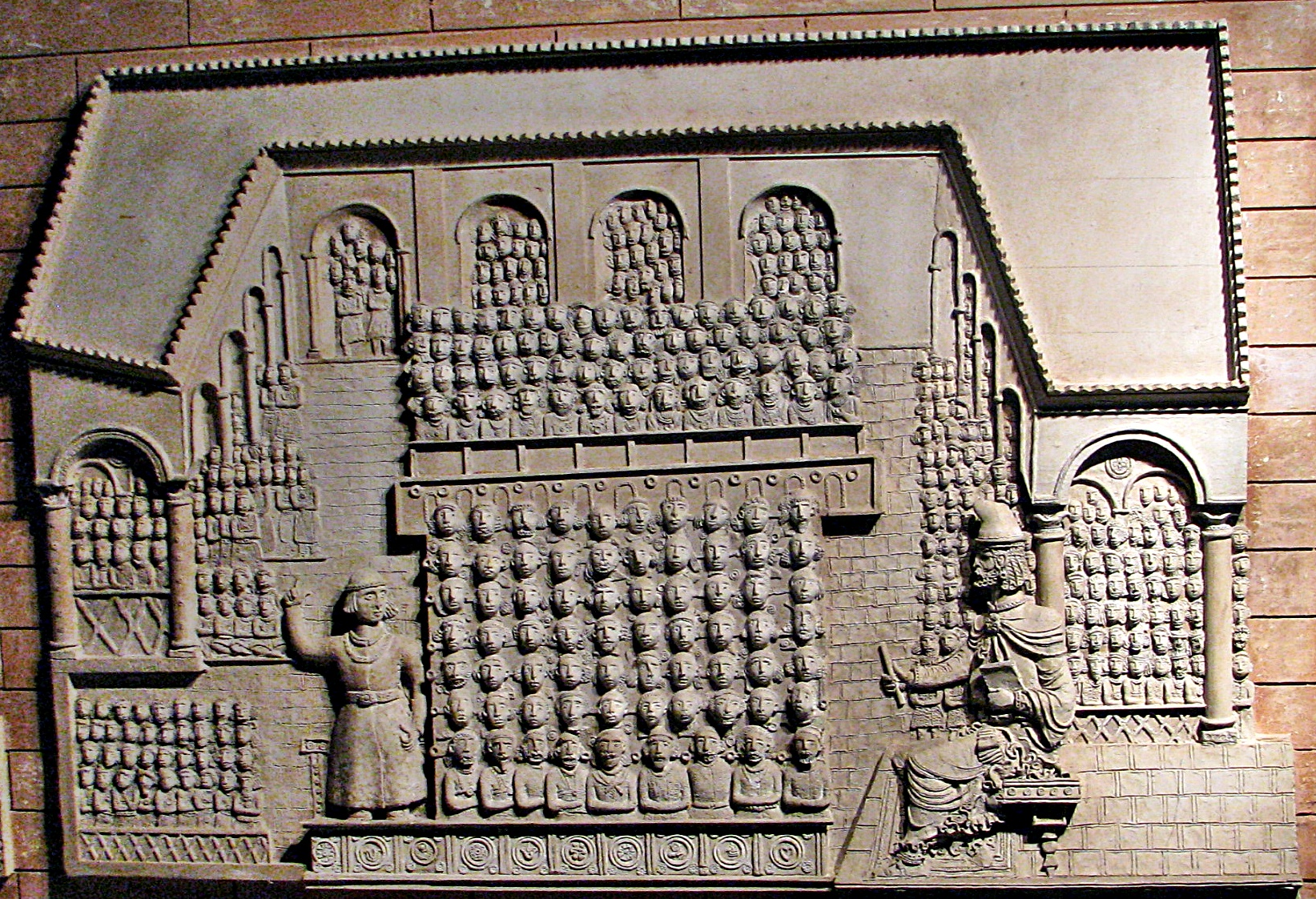
A depiction of Sura (from Beit Hatefutsot)

The Geonic period (589 CE (Hebrew date: 4349) to 1038 CE (Hebrew date: 4798)) takes its name from Gaon, the title given to the heads of the three yeshivas which existed from the third to the thirteenth century. The Geonim acted as the principals of their individual yeshivot, and as spiritual leaders and high judges for the wider communities tied to them. The yeshiva conducted all official business in the name of its Gaon, and all correspondence to or from the yeshiva was addressed directly to the Gaon.

Throughout the Geonic Period there were three yeshivot, each named for the cities in which they were located: Jerusalem, Sura, and Pumbedita; the yeshiva of Jerusalem would later relocate to Cairo, and the yeshivot of Sura and Pumbedita to Baghdad, but retain their original names. Each Jewish community would associate itself with one of the three yeshivot; Jews living around the Mediterranean typically followed the yeshiva in Jerusalem, while those living in the Arabian Peninsula and modern-day Iraq and Iran typically followed one of the two yeshivot in Baghdad. There was no requirement for this, and each community could choose to associate with any of the yeshivot.

The yeshiva served as the highest educational institution for the Rabbis of this period. In addition to this, the yeshiva wielded great power as the principal body for interpreting Jewish law. The community regarded the Gaon of a yeshiva as the highest judge on all matters of Jewish law. Each yeshiva ruled differently on matters of ritual and law; the other yeshivot accepted these divisions, and all three ranked as equally orthodox. The yeshiva also served as an administrative authority, in conjunction with local communities, by appointing members to serve as the head of local congregations. These heads of a congregation served as a link between the congregation and the larger yeshiva it was attached to. These leaders would also submit questions to the yeshiva to obtain final rulings on issues of dogma, ritual, or law. Each congregation was expected to follow only one yeshiva to prevent conflict with different rulings issued by different yeshivot.

The yeshivot were financially supported by a number of means, including fixed voluntary, annual contributions; these contributions being collected and handled by local leaders appointed by the yeshiva. Private gifts and donations from individuals were also common, especially during holidays, consisting of money or goods.

The yeshiva of Jerusalem was finally forced into exile in Cairo in 1127, and eventually dispersed entirely. Likewise, the yeshivot of Sura and Pumbedita were dispersed following the Mongol invasions of the 13th century. After this education in Jewish religious studies became the responsibility of individual synagogues. No organization ever came to replace the three great yeshivot of Jerusalem, Sura and Pumbedita.

=== To 19th century ===
After the Geonic Period Jews established more Yeshiva academies in Europe and in Northern Africa, including the Kairuan yeshiva in Tunisia (Hebrew: ישיבת קאירואן) that was established by Chushiel Ben Elchanan (Hebrew: חושיאל בן אלחנן) in 974.

Traditionally, every town rabbi had the right to maintain a number of full or part-time pupils in the town's beth midrash (study hall), which was usually adjacent to the synagogue. Their cost of living was covered by community taxation. After a number of years, the students who received semikha (rabbinical ordination) would either take up a vacant rabbinical position elsewhere or join the workforce.

==== Lithuanian ====
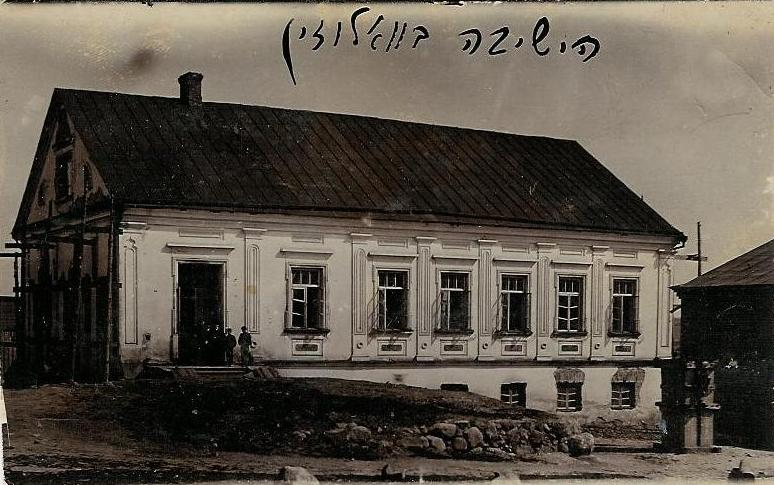
Volozhin yeshiva, "mother of the yeshivas"

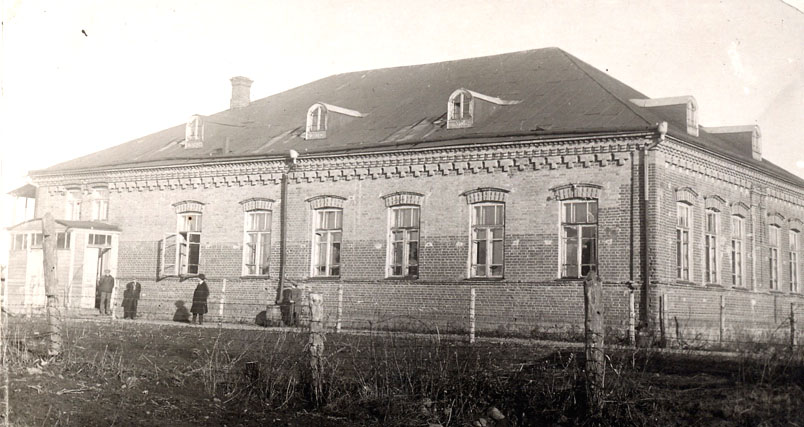
Mir yeshiva, Russian Empire

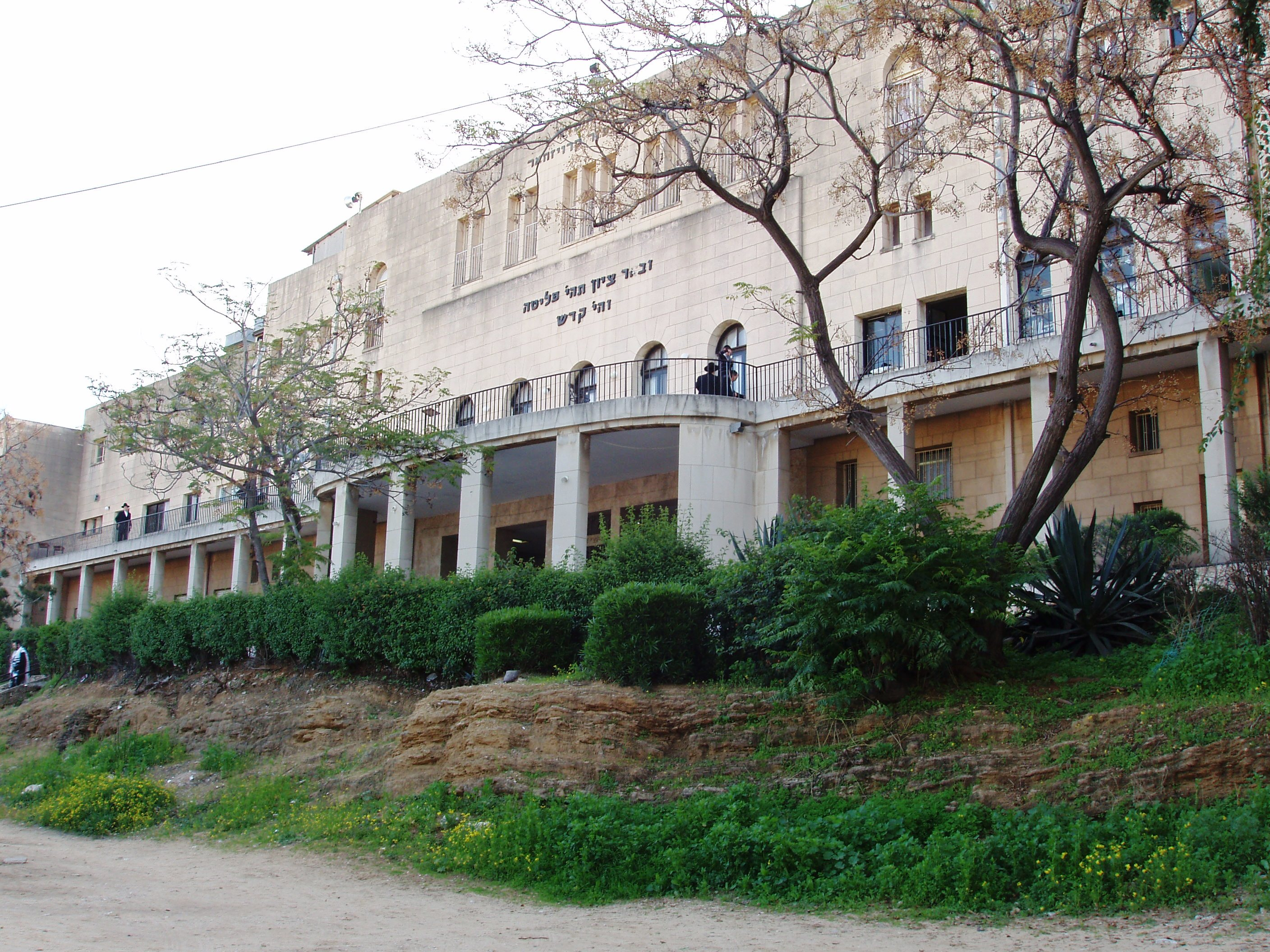
Ponevezh Yeshiva in Bnei Brak, Israel

Organised Torah study was revolutionised by Chaim Volozhin, an influential 18th-century Lithuanian leader of Judaism and disciple of the Vilna Gaon. In his view, the traditional arrangement did not cater to those looking for more intensive study.

With the support of his teacher, Volozhin gathered interested students and started a yeshiva in the town of Valozhyn, located in modern-day Belarus. The Volozhin yeshiva was closed some 60 years later in 1892 following the Russian government's demands for the introduction of certain secular studies. Thereafter, a number of yeshivot opened in other towns and cities, most notably Slabodka, Panevėžys, Mir, Brisk, and Telz. Many prominent contemporary yeshivot in the United States and Israel are continuations of these institutions, and often bear the same name.

In the 19th century, Israel Salanter initiated the Mussar movement in non-Hasidic Lithuanian Jewry, which sought to encourage yeshiva students and the wider community to spend regular times devoted to the study of Jewish ethical works. Concerned by the new social and religious changes of the Haskalah (the Jewish Enlightenment), and other emerging political ideologies (such as Zionism) that often opposed traditional Judaism, the masters of Mussar saw a need to augment Talmudic study with more personal works. These comprised earlier classic Jewish ethical texts (mussar literature), as well as a new literature for the movement. After early opposition, the Lithuanian yeshiva world saw the need for this new component in their curriculum, and set aside times for individual mussar study and mussar talks ("mussar shmues"). A mashgiach ruchani (spiritual mentor) encouraged the personal development of each student. To some degree, this Lithuanian movement arose in response, and as an alternative, to the separate mystical study of the Hasidic Judaism world. Hasidism began in the previous century within traditional Jewish life in Ukraine, and spread to Hungary, Poland and Russia. As the 19th century brought upheavals and threats to traditional Judaism, the Mussar teachers saw the benefit of the new spiritual focus in Hasidism, and developed their alternative ethical approach to spirituality.

Some variety developed within Lithuanian yeshivas to methods of studying Talmud and mussar, for example whether the emphasis would be placed on beki'ut (breadth) or iyyun (depth). Pilpul, a type of in-depth analytical and casuistic argumentation popular from the 16th to 18th centuries that was traditionally reserved for investigative Talmudic study, was not always given a place. The new analytical approach of the Brisker method, developed by Chaim Soloveitchik, has become widely popular. Other approaches include those of Mir, Chofetz Chaim, and Telz. In mussar, different schools developed, such as Slabodka and Novhardok, though today, a decline in devoted spiritual self-development from its earlier intensity has to some extent levelled out the differences.

==== Hasidic ====
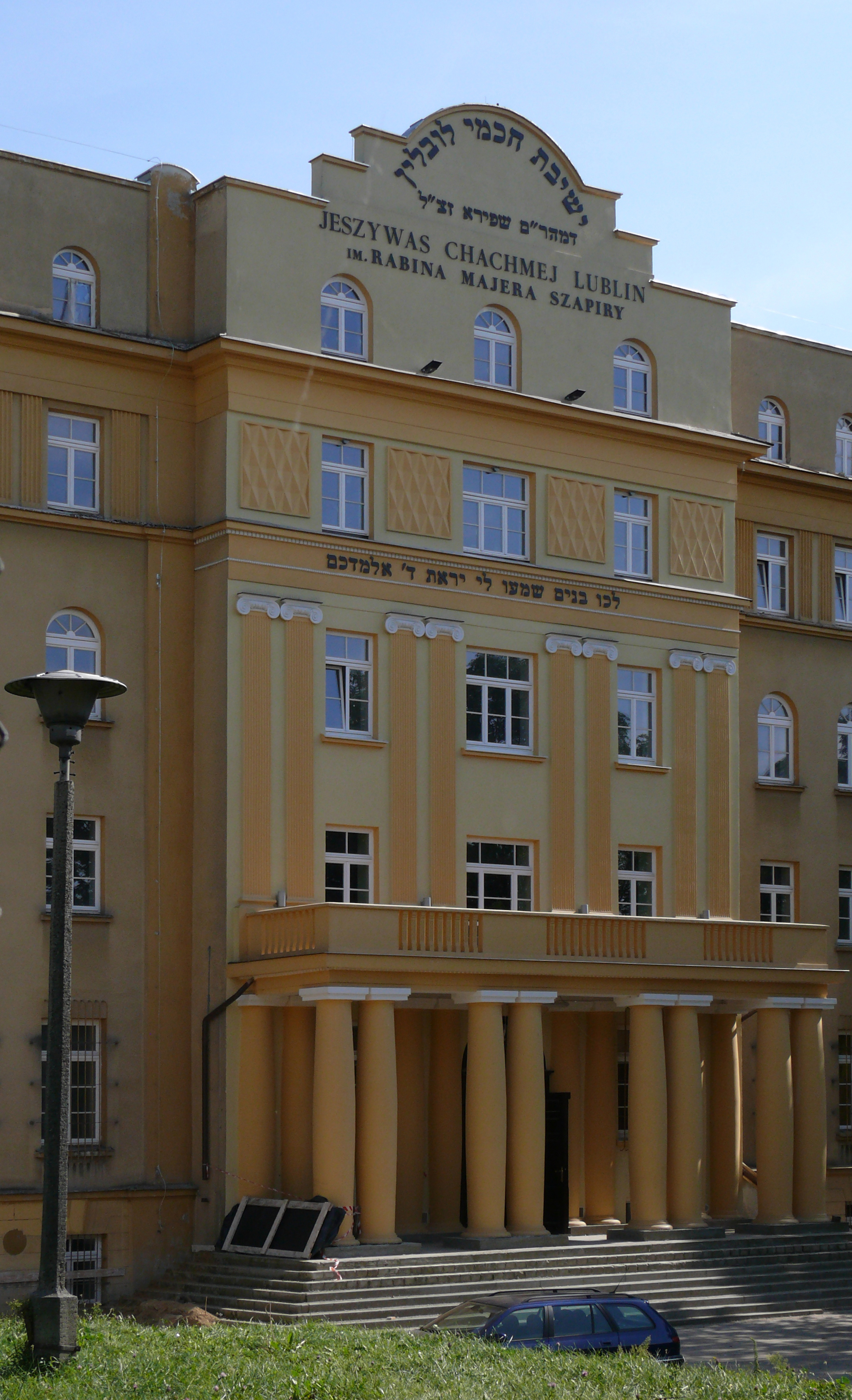
Chachmei Lublin Yeshiva, now a national monument

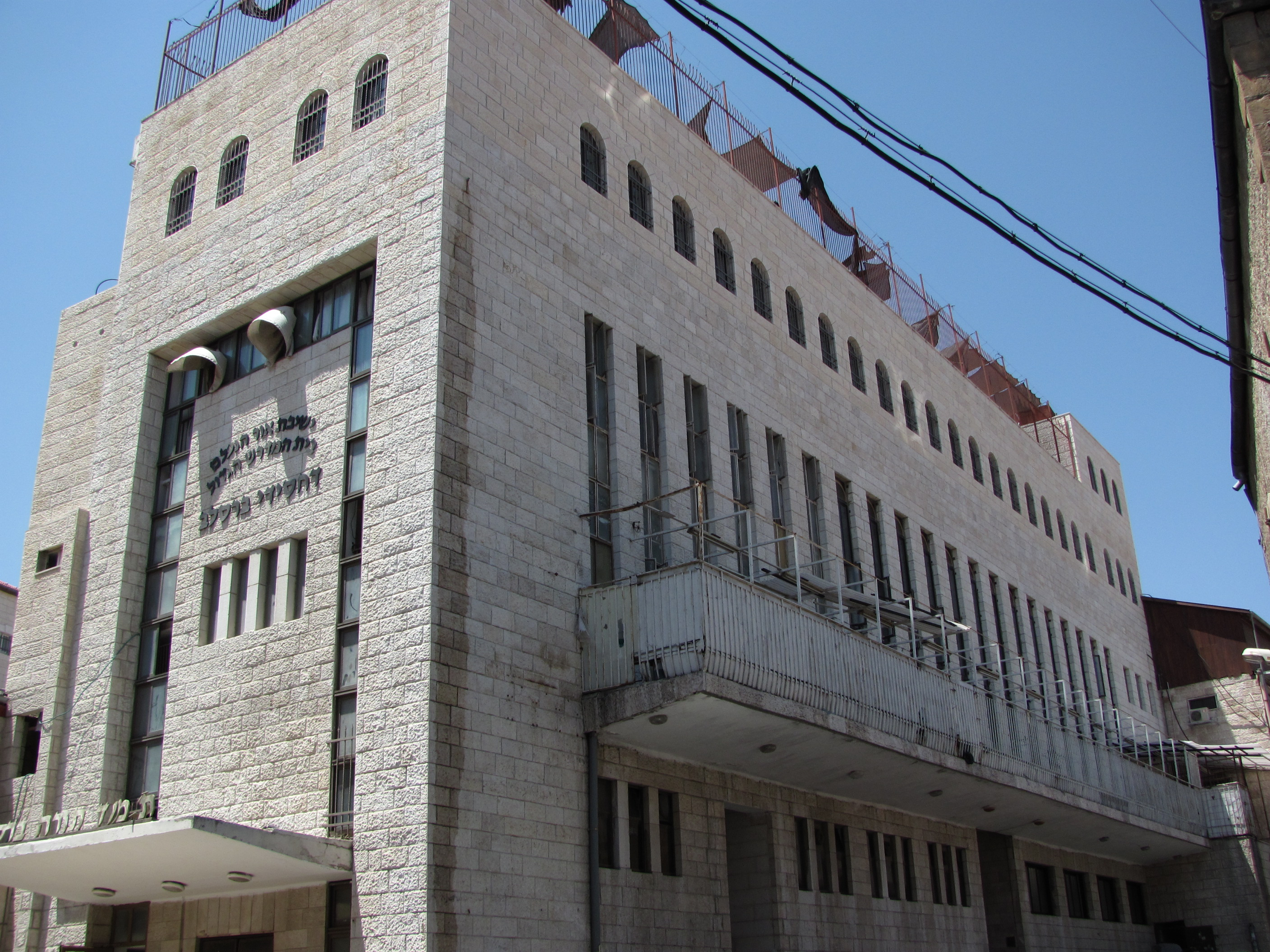
The Breslov Yeshiva in Mea Shearim, Jerusalem.

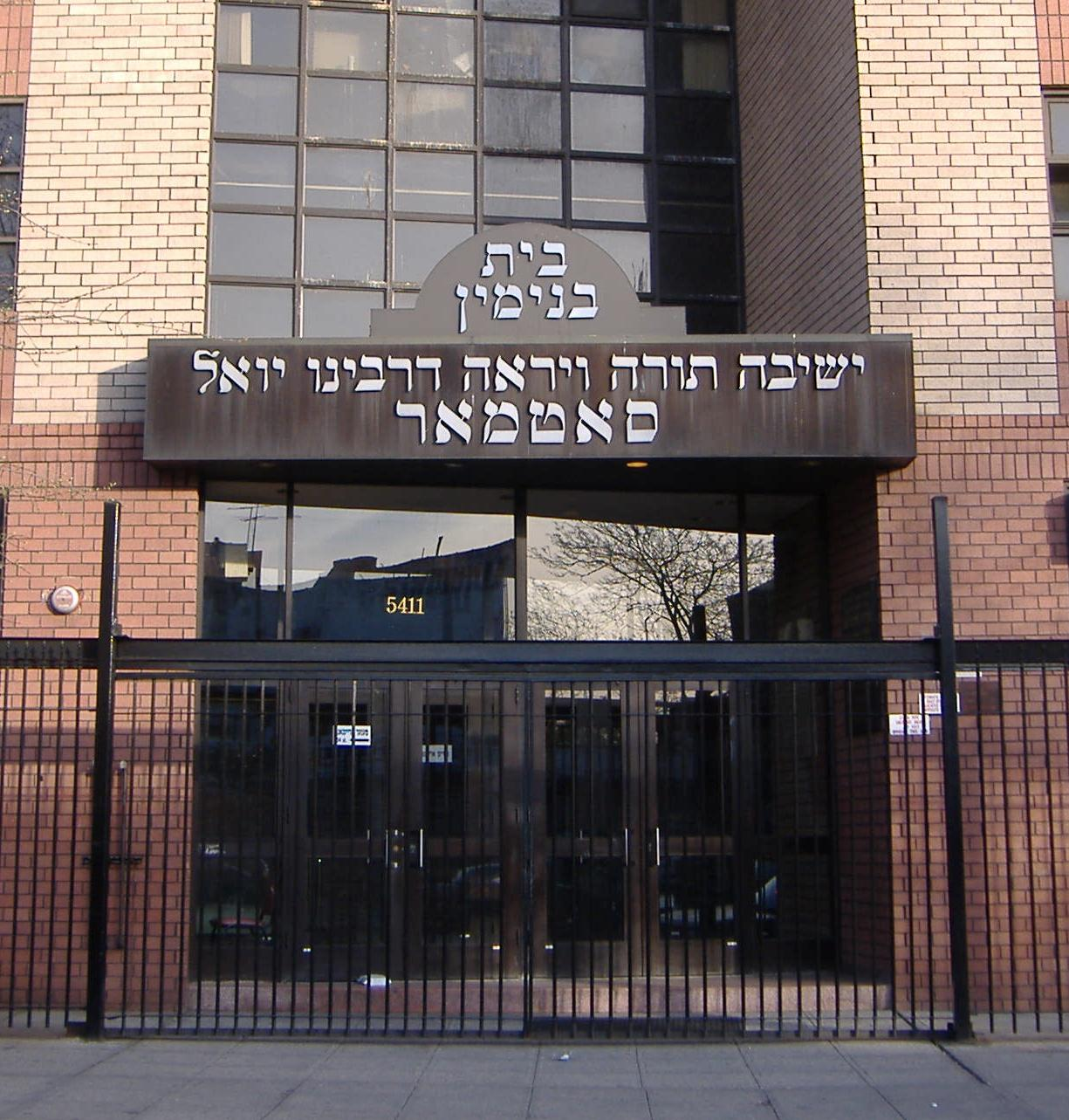
Satmar Yeshiva in Brooklyn, New York.

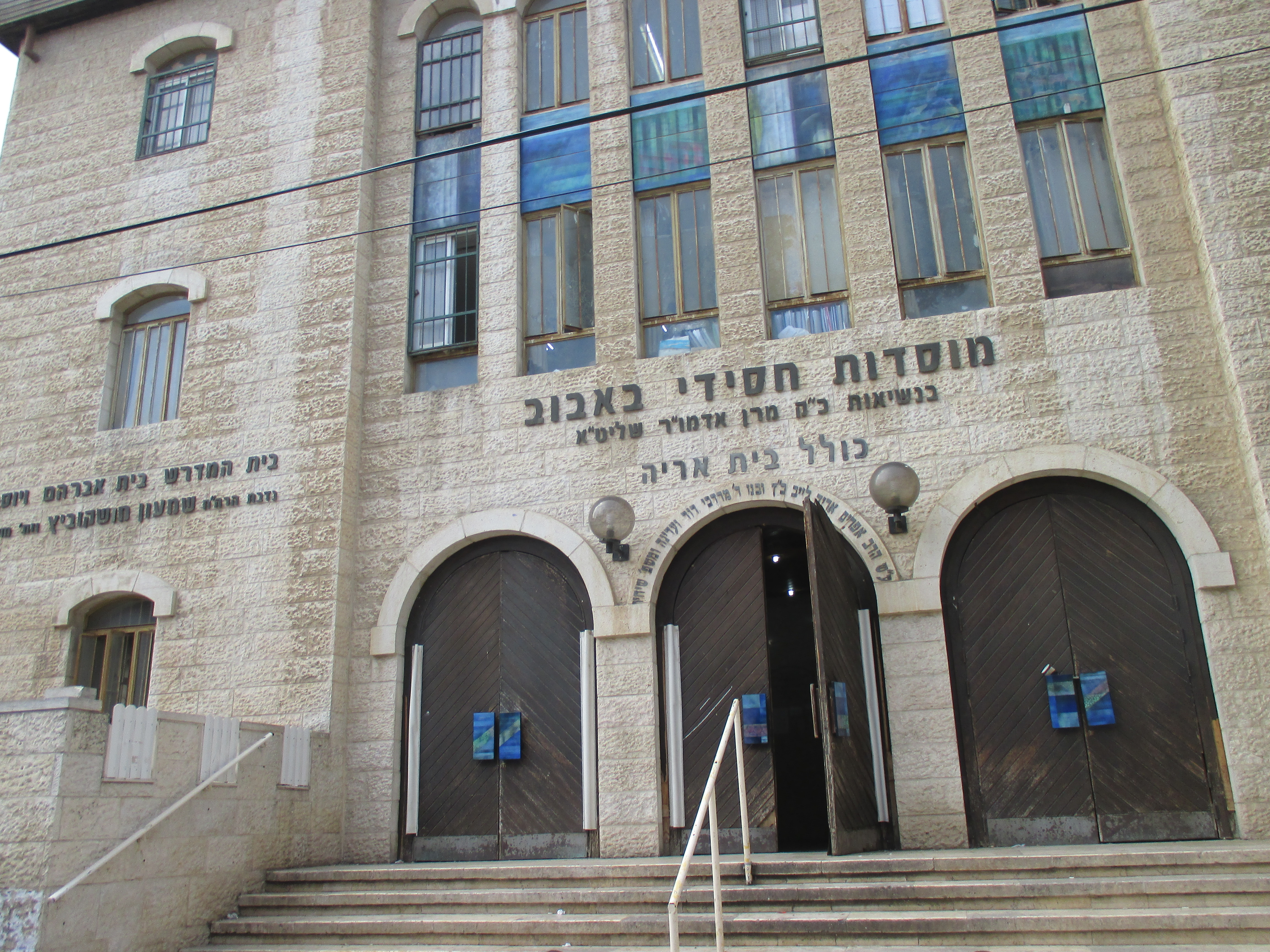
Bobov Kollel in Jerusalem

With the success of the yeshiva institution in Lithuanian Jewry, the Hasidic world developed their own yeshivas, in their areas of Eastern Europe. These comprised the traditional Jewish focus on Talmudic literature that is central to Rabbinic Judaism, augmented by study of Hasidic philosophy (Hasidism). Examples of these Hasidic yeshivas are the Chabad Lubavitch yeshiva system of Tomchei Temimim, founded by Sholom Dovber Schneersohn in Russia in 1897, and the Chachmei Lublin Yeshiva established in Poland in 1930 by Meir Shapiro, who is renowned in both Hasidic and Lithuanian Jewish circles for initiating the Daf Yomi daily cycle of Talmud study. (For contemporary yeshivas, see, for example, under Satmar, Belz, Bobov, Breslov and Pupa.)

In many Hasidic yeshivas, study of Hasidic texts is a secondary activity, similar to the additional mussar curriculum in Lithuanian yeshivas. These paths see Hasidism as a means to the end of inspiring emotional devekut (spiritual attachment to God) and mystical enthusiasm. In this context, the personal pilgrimage of a Hasid to his Rebbe is a central feature of spiritual life, in order to awaken spiritual fervour. Often, such paths will reserve the Shabbat in the yeshiva for the sweeter teachings of the classic texts of Hasidism.

In contrast, Chabad and Breslov, in their different ways, place daily study of their dynasties' Hasidic texts in central focus; see below. Illustrative of this is Sholom Dovber Schneersohn's wish in establishing the Chabad yeshiva system, that the students should spend a part of the daily curriculum learning Chabad Hasidic texts "with pilpul". The idea to learn Hasidic mystical texts with similar logical profundity, derives from the unique approach in the works of the Rebbes of Chabad, initiated by its founder Schneur Zalman of Liadi, to systematically investigate and articulate the "Torah of the Baal Shem Tov" in intellectual forms. Further illustrative of this is the differentiation in Chabad thought (such as the "Tract on Ecstasy" by Dovber Schneuri) between general Hasidism's emphasis on emotional enthusiasm and the Chabad ideal of intellectually reserved ecstasy. In the Breslov movement, in contrast, the daily study of works from the imaginative, creative radicalism of Nachman of Breslov awakens the necessary soulfulness with which to approach other Jewish study and observance.

==== Sephardi ====
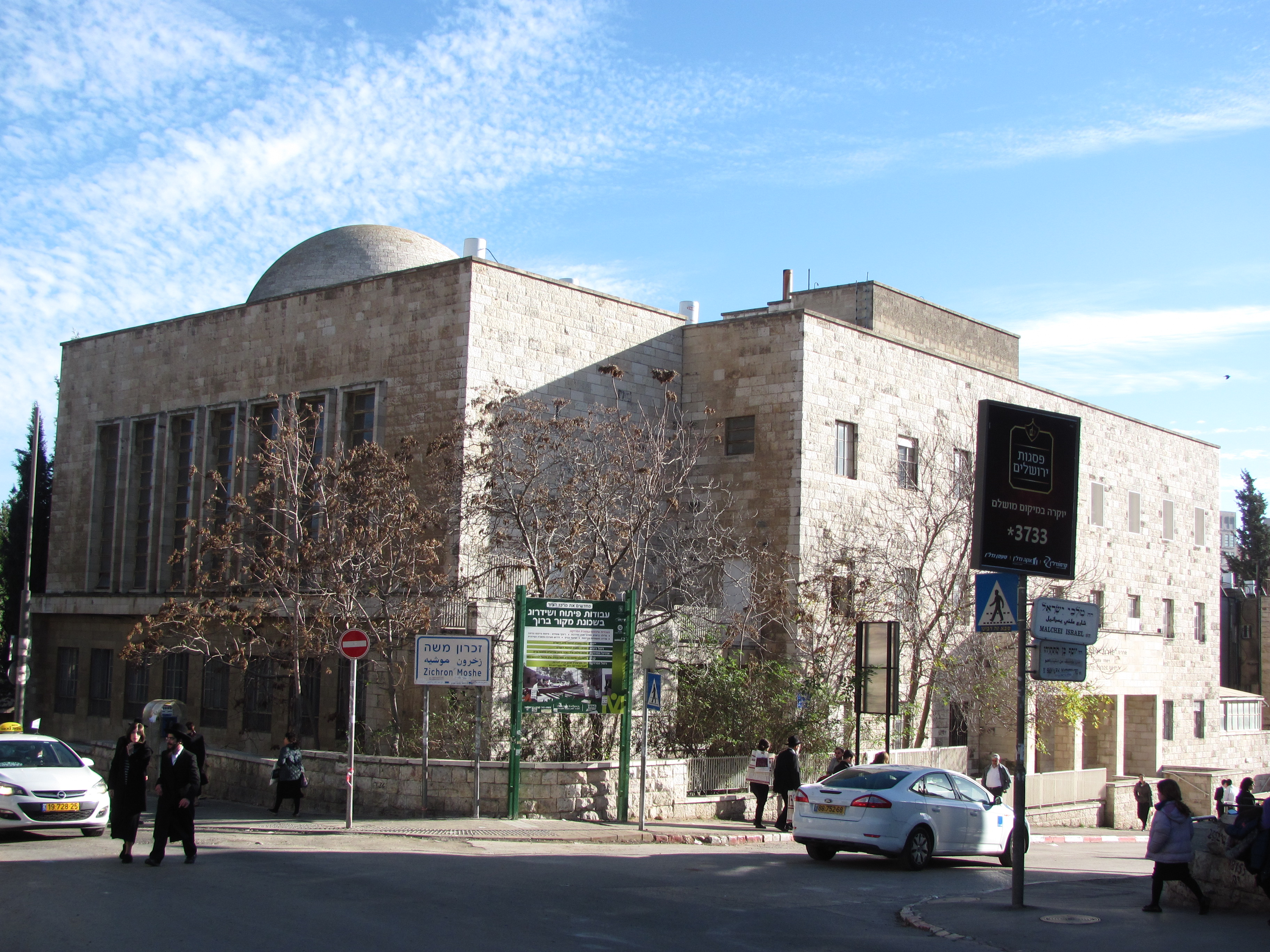
Geula branch of Porat Yosef Yeshiva.

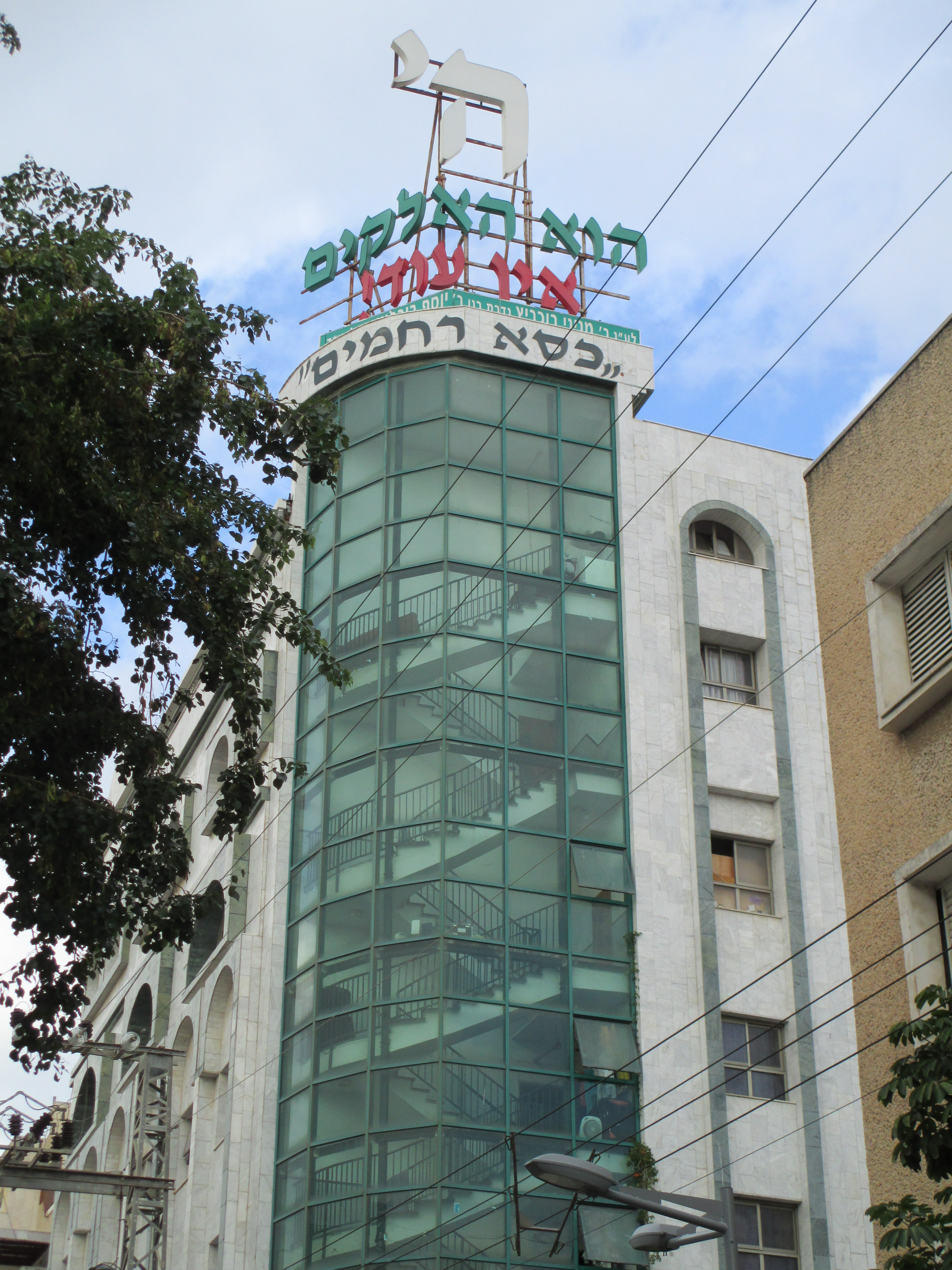
Kisse Rahamim yeshivah, Bnei Brak

Although the yeshiva as an institution is in some ways a continuation of the Talmudic Academies in Babylonia, large scale educational institutions of this kind were not characteristic of the North African and Middle Eastern Sephardi Jewish world in pre-modern times: education typically took place in a more informal setting in the synagogue or in the entourage of a famous rabbi. In medieval Spain, and immediately following the expulsion in 1492, there were some schools which combined Jewish studies with sciences such as logic and astronomy, similar to the contemporary Islamic madrasas. In 19th century Jerusalem, a college was typically an endowment for supporting ten adult scholars rather than an educational institution in the modern sense; towards the end of the century a school for orphans was founded providing for some rabbinic studies. Early educational institutions on the European model were Midrash Bet Zilkha founded in 1870s Iraq and Porat Yosef Yeshiva founded in Jerusalem in 1914. Also notable is the Bet El yeshiva founded in 1737 in Jerusalem for advanced Kabbalistic studies. Later Sephardic yeshivot are usually on the model either of Porat Yosef or of the Ashkenazi institutions.

The Sephardic world has traditionally placed the study of Kabbalah (esoteric Jewish mysticism) in a more mainstream position than in the European Ashkenazi world. This difference of emphasis arose as a result of the Sabbatean heresy in the 17th century, that suppressed widespread study of Kabbalah in Europe in favour of Rabbinic Talmudic study. In Eastern European Lithuanian life, Kabbalah was reserved for an intellectual elite, while the mystical revival of Hasidism articulated Kabbalistic theology through Hasidic thought. These factors did not affect the Sephardi Jewish world, which retained a wider connection to Kabbalah in its traditionally observant communities. With the establishment of Sephardi yeshivas in Israel after the immigration of the Arabic Jewish communities there, some Sephardi yeshivas incorporated study of more accessible Kabbalistic texts into their curriculum. The European prescriptions to restrict advanced Kabbalistic study to mature and elite students also influence the choice of texts in such yeshivas.

=== 19th century to present ===
==== Conservative movement ====
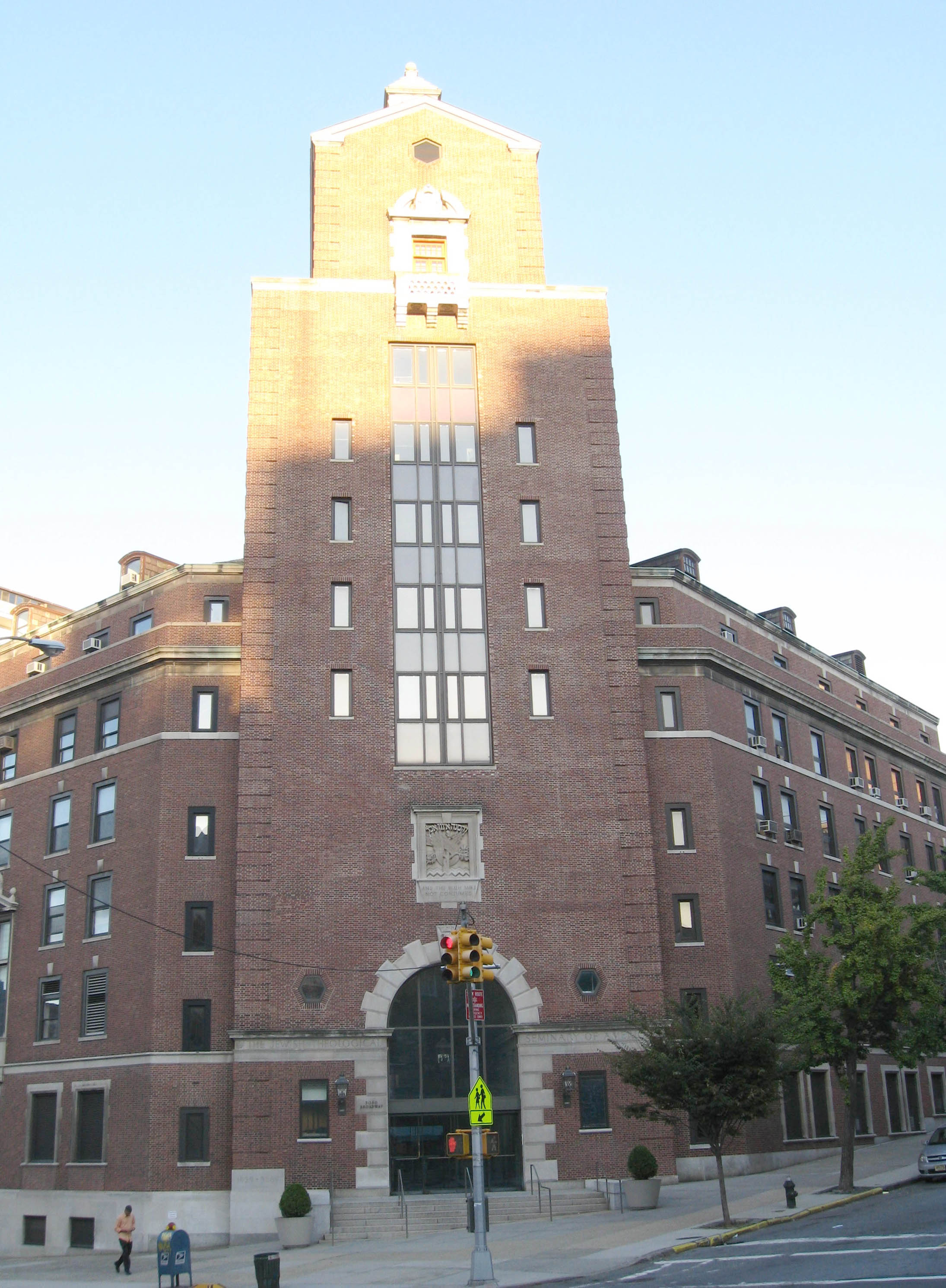
JTS building in Manhattan

In 1854, the Jewish Theological Seminary of Breslau was founded. It was headed by Zecharias Frankel, and was viewed as the first educational institution associated with "positive-historical Judaism", the predecessor of Conservative Judaism. In subsequent years, Conservative Judaism established a number of other institutions of higher learning (such as the Jewish Theological Seminary of America in New York City) that emulate the style of traditional yeshivas in significant ways. Many do not officially refer to themselves as "yeshivas" (one exception is the Conservative Yeshiva in Jerusalem), and all are open to both women and men, who study in the same classrooms and follow the same curriculum. Students may study part-time, as in a kollel, or full-time, and they may study lishmah (for the sake of studying itself) or towards earning rabbinic ordination.

==== Nondenominational or mixed ====
Non-denominational yeshivas and kollels with connections to Conservative Judaism include Yeshivat Hadar in New York, whose leaders include Rabbinical Assembly members Elie Kaunfer and Shai Held. The rabbinical school of the Academy for Jewish Religion in California is led by Conservative rabbi Mel Gottlieb. The faculty of the Academy for Jewish Religion in New York and of the Rabbinical School of Hebrew College in Newton Centre, Massachusetts also includes many Conservative rabbis. See also Institute of Traditional Judaism.

More recently, several non-traditional, and nondenominational (also called "transdenominational" or "postdenominational") seminaries have been established. These grant semikha in a shorter time, and with a modified curriculum, generally focusing on leadership and pastoral roles. These are JSLI, RSI, PRS and Ateret Tzvi. The Wolkowisk Mesifta is aimed at community professionals with significant knowledge and experience, and provides a tailored program to each candidate.

==== Reform and Reconstructionist seminaries ====
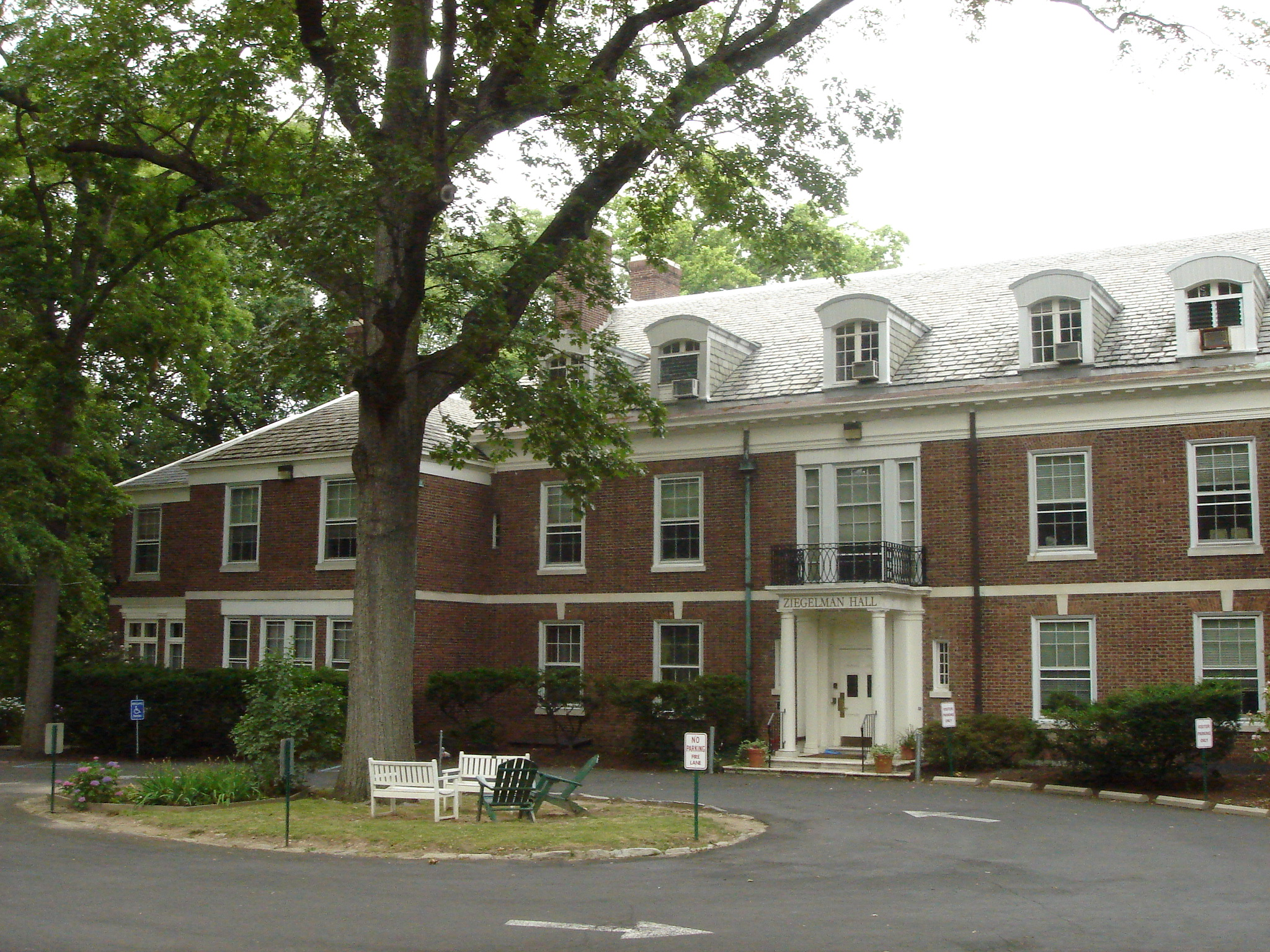
Reconstructionist Rabbinical College

Hebrew Union College (HUC), affiliated with Reform Judaism, was founded in 1875 under the leadership of Isaac Mayer Wise in Cincinnati, Ohio. HUC later opened additional locations in New York, Los Angeles, and Jerusalem. It is a rabbinical seminary or college mostly geared for the training of rabbis and clergy specifically. Similarly, the Reconstructionist Rabbinical College of Reconstructionist Judaism, founded in Pennsylvania in 1968, functions to train its future clergy. Some Reform and Reconstructionist teachers also teach at the non-denominational seminaries mentioned above. In Europe, Reform Judaism trains rabbis at Leo Baeck College in London, UK and Abraham Geiger Kolleg in Potsdam, Germany. None of these institutions describes itself as a "yeshiva".

==== Contemporary Orthodox ====
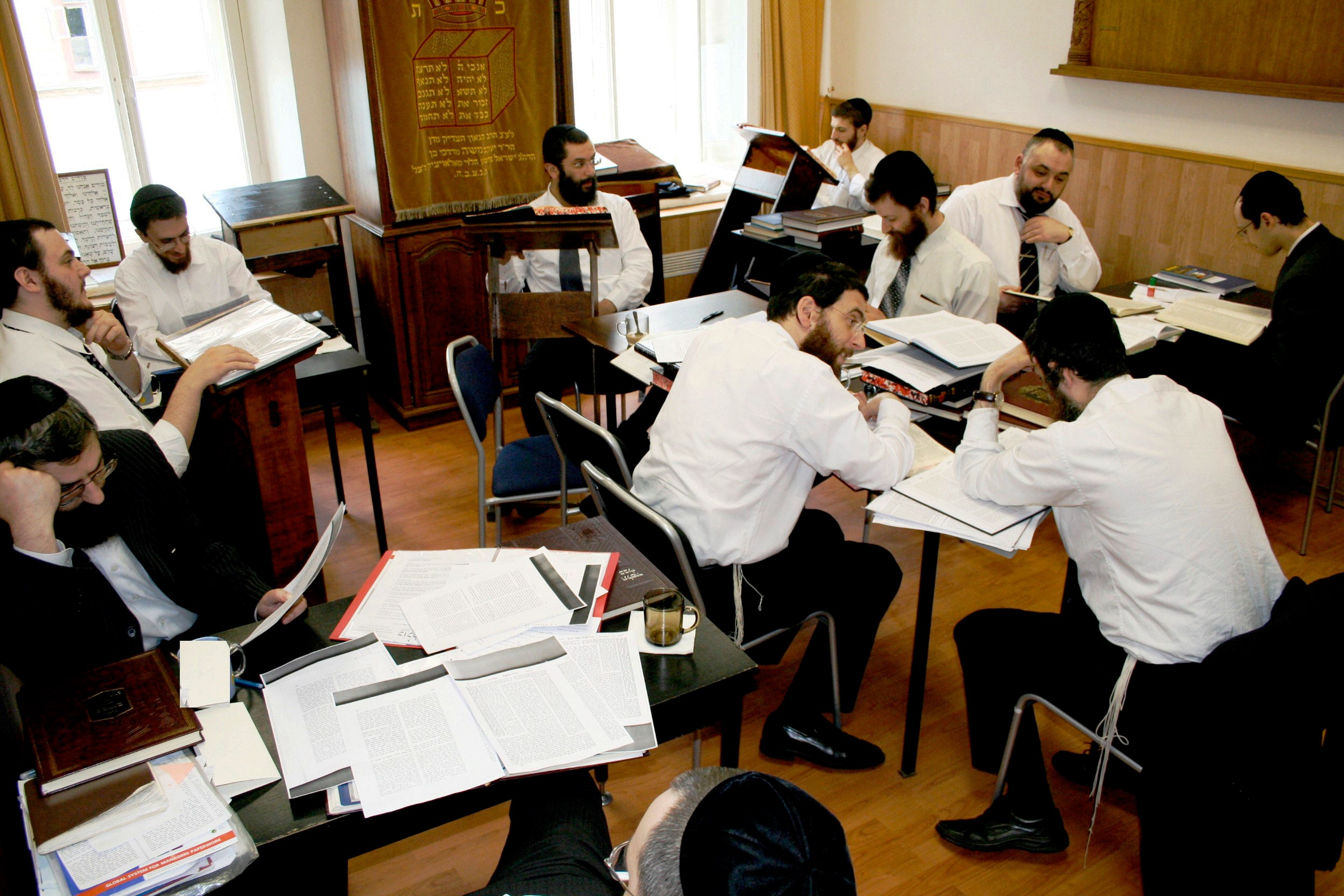
Kollel Birkat Yitzhak, Moscow

World War II and the Holocaust brought the yeshivot of Eastern and Central Europe to an end; although many scholars and rabbinic students who survived the war established yeshivot in Israel as well a number of Western countries. The Yeshiva of Nitra was the last surviving in occupied Europe. Many students and faculty of the Mir Yeshiva were able to escape to Siberia, with the Yeshiva ultimately continuing to operate in Shanghai; see Yeshivas in World War II.

From the mid-20th century the greatest number of yeshivot, and the most important were centered in Israel and in the U.S.; they were also found in many other Western countries, prominent examples being Gateshead Yeshiva in England (one of the descendants of Novardok) and the Yeshiva of Aix-les-Bains, France. The Chabad movement was particularly active in this direction, establishing yeshivot also in France, North Africa, Australia, and South Africa; this "network of institutions" is known as Tomchei Temimim. Many prominent contemporary yeshivot in the U.S. and Israel are continuations of European institutions, and often bear the same name.

===== Israel =====
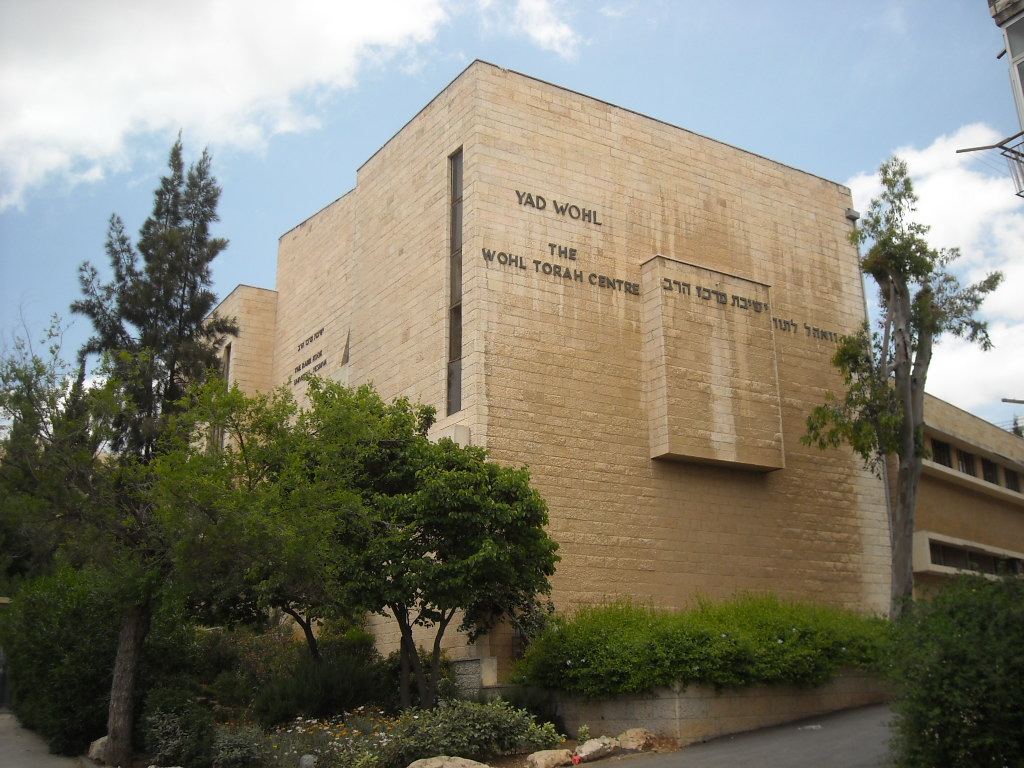
Mercaz Harav, Jerusalem

Yeshivot in Israel have operated since Talmudic times, as above; see Talmudic academies in Eretz Yisrael. More recent examples include the Great Academy of Paris (c. 1280); the Ari Ashkenazi Synagogue (since the mid-1500s); the Bet El yeshiva (operating since 1737); and Etz Chaim Yeshiva (since 1841). Various yeshivot were established in Israel in the early 20th century: Shaar Hashamayim in 1906, Chabad's Toras Emes in 1911, Hebron Yeshiva in 1924, Sfas Emes in 1925, Lomza in 1926. After (and during) World War II, numerous other Haredi and Hasidic Yeshivot were re-established there by survivors. The Mir Yeshiva in Jerusalem – today the largest Yeshiva in the world – was established in 1944, by Rabbi Eliezer Yehuda Finkel who had traveled to Palestine to obtain visas for his students; Ponevezh similarly by Rabbi Yosef Shlomo Kahaneman; and Knesses Chizkiyahu in 1949. The leading Sephardi Yeshiva, Porat Yosef, was founded in 1914; its predecessor, Yeshivat Ohel Moed was founded in 1904. From the 1940s and onward, especially following immigration of the Arabic Jewish communities, Sephardi leaders, such as Ovadia Yosef and Ben-Zion Meir Hai Uziel, established various yeshivot to facilitate Torah education for Sephardi and Mizrahi Jews (and alternative to Lithuanian yeshivot).

The Haredi community has grown with time – In 2018, 12% of Israel's population was Haredi, including Sephardic Haredim – supporting numerous yeshivot correspondingly. Boys and girls here attend separate schools, and proceed to higher Torah study, in a yeshiva or seminary, respectively, starting anywhere between the ages of 13 and 18; see Chinuch Atzmai and Bais Yaakov. A significant proportion of young men then remain in yeshiva until their marriage; thereafter many continue their Torah studies in a kollel. (In 2018, there were 133,000 in full-time learning .) Kollel studies usually focus on deep analysis of Talmud, and those Tractates not usually covered in the standard "undergraduate" program; see § Talmud study below. Some Kollels similarly focus on halacha in total, others specifically on those topics required for Semikha (Rabbinic ordination) or Dayanut (qualification as a Rabbinic Judge). The certification in question is often conferred by the Rosh Yeshiva.

Mercaz Harav, the foundational and leading Religious-Zionist yeshiva was established in 1924 by Ashkenazi Chief Rabbi Abraham Isaac Kook. Many in the Religious Zionist community today attend a Hesder yeshiva (discussed below) during their national service; these offer a kollel for Rabbinical students. (Students generally prepare for the Semikha test of the Chief Rabbinate of Israel; until his recent passing (2020) commonly for that of the posek R. Zalman Nechemia Goldberg.) Training as a Dayan in this community is usually through Machon Ariel (Machon Harry Fischel), also founded by Rav Kook, or Kollel Eretz Hemda. Women in this community, as above, study in a Midrasha. High school students study at Mamlachti dati schools, often associated with Bnei Akiva. Bar Ilan University allows students to combine Yeshiva studies with university study; Jerusalem College of Technology similarly, which also offers a Haredi track; there are several colleges of education associated with Hesder and the Midrashot (these often offer specializations in Tanakh and Machshavah – discussed below). See Religious Zionism § Educational institutions.

===== United States =====
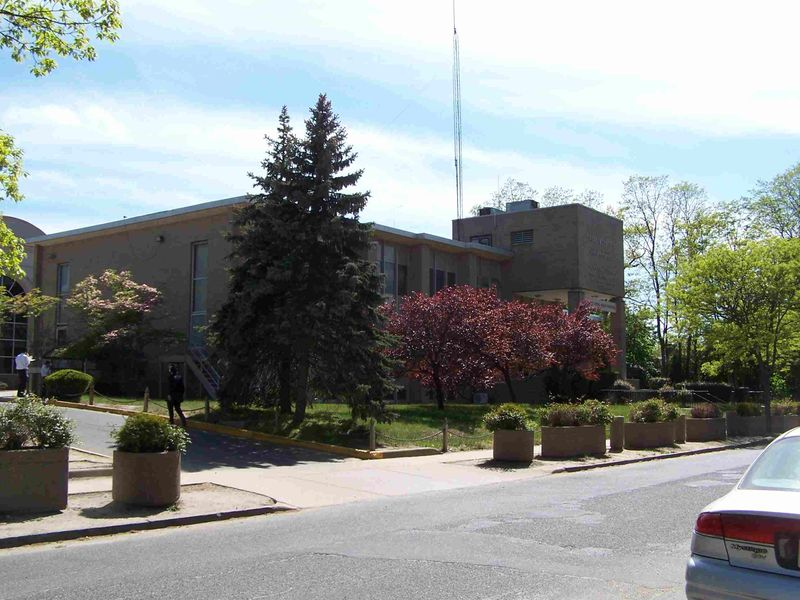
Beth Medrash Govoha, Lakewood, New Jersey – largest yeshiva outside Israel.

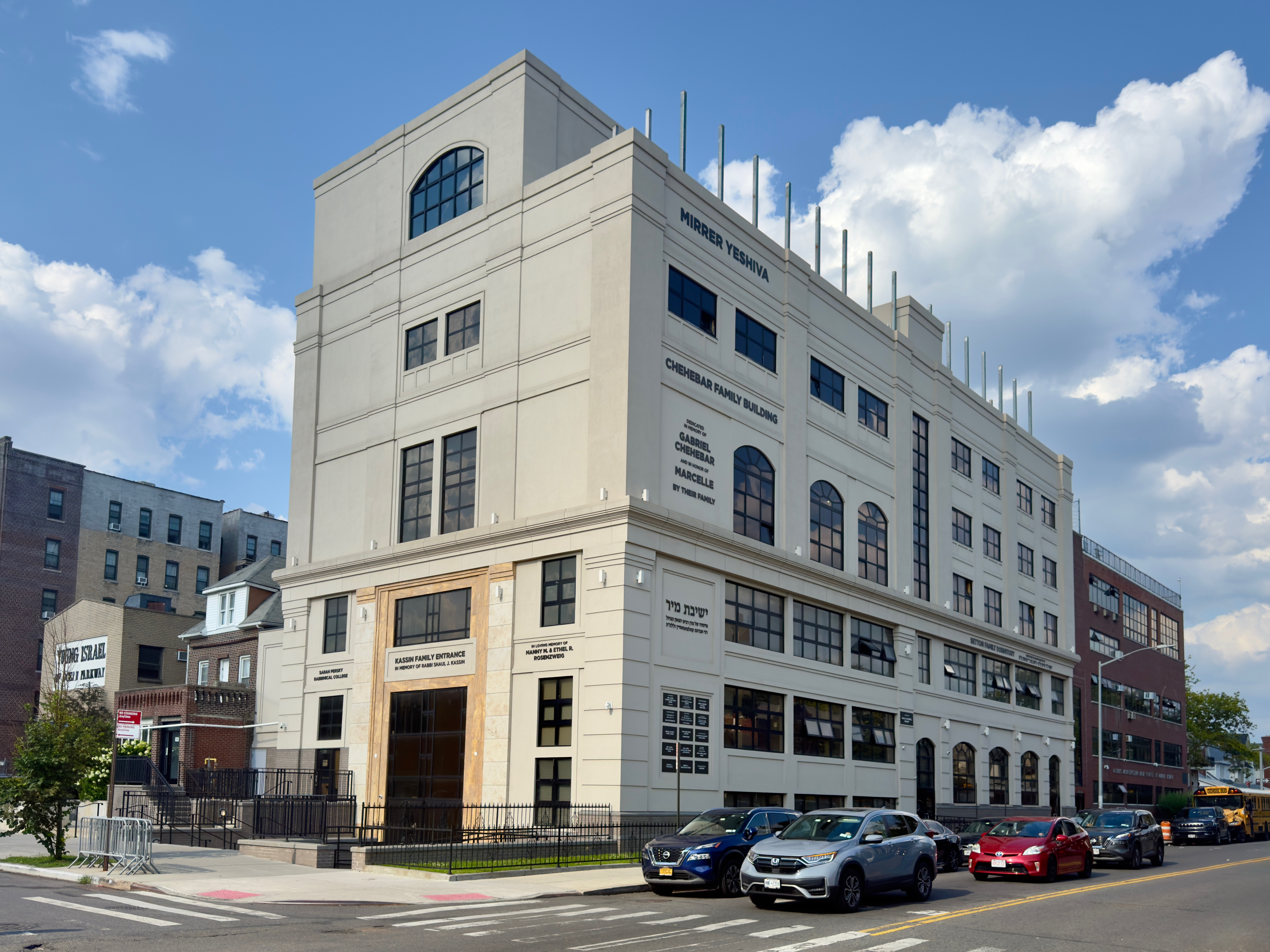
Mir Yeshiva in Brooklyn

The first Orthodox yeshiva in the U.S. was Etz Chaim of New York (1886), modeled after Volozhin. It developed into the Rabbi Isaac Elchanan Theological Seminary (1896; "RIETS") and eventually Yeshiva University in 1945. It was established in the wake of the immigration of Central and Eastern European Jews (1880s – 1924). Mesivtha Tifereth Jerusalem, founded in 1907, was led by Rabbi Moshe Feinstein from the 1940s through 1986; Yeshiva Rabbi Chaim Berlin, est 1904, was headed by Rabbi Yitzchok Hutner from 1943 to 1980. Many Hasidic dynasties have their main Yeshivot in America, typically established in the 1940s; the Central Lubavitcher Yeshiva has over 1000 students.

The postwar establishment of Ashkenazi yeshivot and kollelim parallels that in Israel; as does the educational pattern in the American Haredi community, although more obtain a secular education at the college level. Beth Medrash Govoha in Lakewood, New Jersey with 3,000 students in the early 2000s was founded in 1943 by R. Aaron Kotler on the "rigid Lithuanian model" that demanded full-time study; it now offers a Bachelor of Talmudic Law degree which allows students to go on to graduate school. The best known of the numerous Haredi yeshivas are, additional to "Lakewood", Telz, "Rabbinical Seminary of America", Ner Yisroel, Chaim Berlin, and Hebrew Theological College; Yeshivish (i.e. satellite) communities often maintain a community kollel. Many Hasidic sects have their own yeshivas, such as Satmar and Bobov, while Chabad operates its Tomchei Temimim nationwide. The first Sephardic yeshiva in the Americas was Yeshivat Mikdash Melech, established in 1972 by Rabbi Haim Benoliel. (In 1988, the yeshiva opened a branch in Israel, Mikdash Melech Jerusalem, to serve English-speaking Sephardic students.) There are over today 600 junior and high schools, typically a Mesivta or Bais Yaakov; see Torah Umesorah.

Modern Orthodox typically spend a year, often two, post-high school in a yeshiva (sometimes Hesder) or Midrasha in Israel. Many thereafter, or instead, attend Yeshiva University, undertaking a dual curriculum, combining academic education with Torah study; see Torah Umadda, and S. Daniel Abraham Israel Program. (A percentage stay in Israel, "making Aliyah"; many also go on to higher education in other American colleges.) Semikha is usually through RIETS, although many Modern Orthodox Rabbis study through Hesder, or other Yeshivot in Israel such as Yeshivat HaMivtar, Mizrachi's Musmachim program, and Machon Ariel. RIETS also houses several post-semikha kollelim, including one focused on Dayanut. Dayanim also train through Kollel Eretz Hemda and Machon Ariel; while Mizrachi's post-semikha Manhigut Toranit program focuses on leadership and scholarship, with the advanced semikha of "Rav Ir". Communities will often host a Torah MiTzion kollel, where Hesder graduates learn and teach, generally for one year. There are numerous Modern Orthodox Jewish day schools, typically offering a beit midrash / metivta program in parallel with the standard curriculum, (often) structured such that students are able to join the first shiur in an Israeli yeshiva.

The US educational pattern is to be found around the Jewish world, with regional differences; see Category:Orthodox yeshivas in Europe and Category:Orthodox yeshivas by country.

== Structure and features ==
typical daily schedule
The following is a typical daily schedule for Beit Midrash students in mainstream Lithuanian yeshivas, although the schedule will vary from Yeshiva to Yeshiva:
- 7:00 a.m. – Optional seder (study session)
- 7:30 a.m. – Shacharit – Morning prayers
- 8:30 a.m. – Session on study of Jewish law
- 9:00 a.m. – Breakfast
- 9:30 a.m. – Morning Talmud study (first seder)
- 12:30 p.m. – Shiur (lecture) – advanced students sometimes dispense with this lecture
- 1:30 p.m. – Lunch
- 2:45 p.m. – Mincha – afternoon prayers
- 3:00 p.m. – Mussar seder – Jewish ethics
- 3:30 p.m. – Talmud study (second seder)
- 7:00 p.m. – Dinner
- 8:00 p.m. – Night seder – Review of lecture, or study of choice.
- 9:25 p.m. – Mussar seder – Jewish Ethics
- 9:45 p.m. – Maariv – Evening prayers
- 10:00 p.m. – Optional evening seder

This schedule is generally maintained Sunday through Thursday. On Thursday nights, there may be an extra long night seder, known as mishmar sometimes lasting beyond 1:00 am, and in some yeshivot even until the following sunrise. On Fridays, there is usually at least one seder in the morning, with unstructured learning schedules for the afternoon. Saturdays have a special Shabbat schedule which includes some sedarim but usually no shiur.

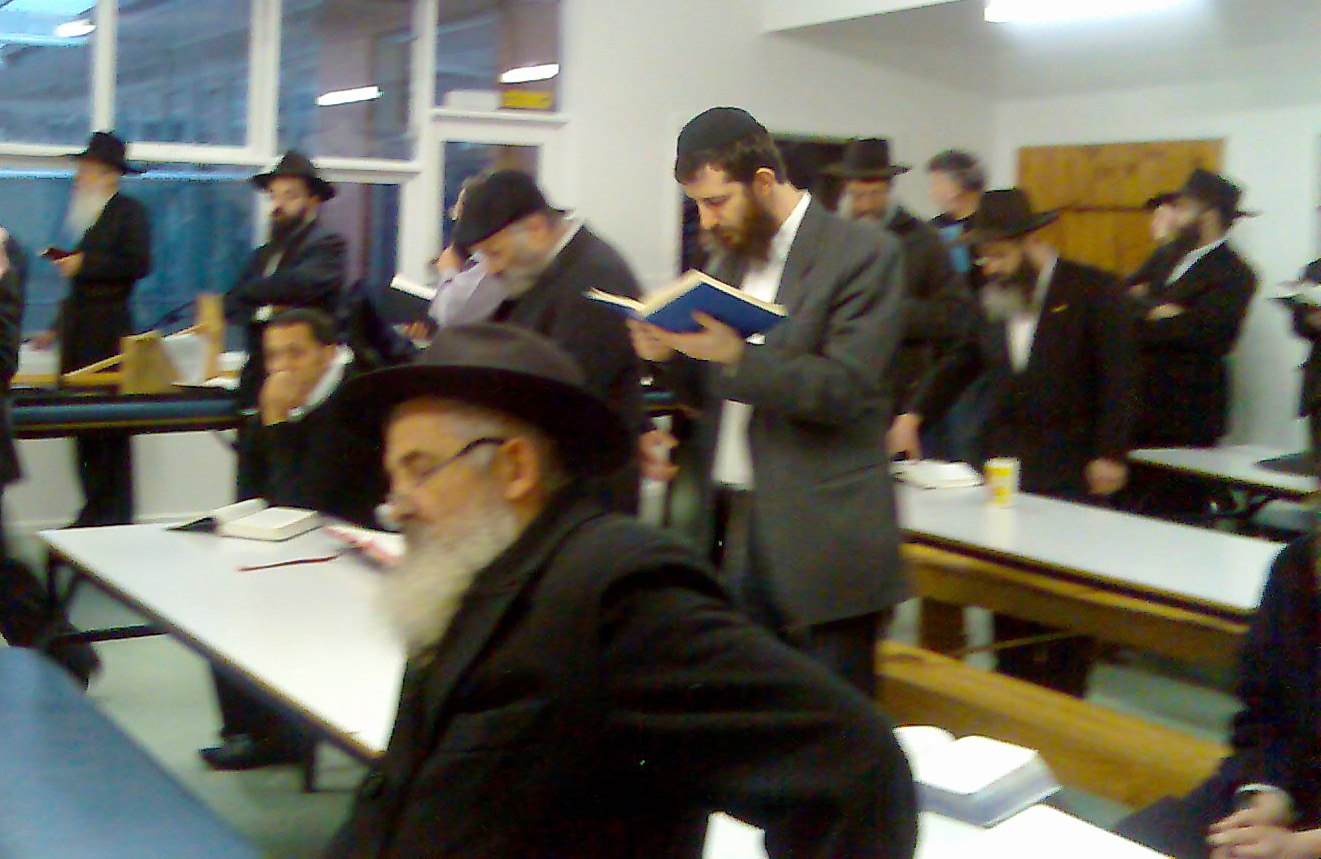
Mincha at Yeshiva Centre, Melbourne

Yeshiva study is differentiated from, for example university study, by several features, apart from the curriculum. The year is structured into "zmanim"; the day is structured into "seders". The learning itself is delivered through a "shiur", a discursive-lecture with pre-specified sources, or "marei mekomot" (מראה מקומות; "bibliography", lit. "indication of the (textual) locations"); study in general, and particularly the preparation for shiur, takes place in "chavruta" or paired-study. This study is in a common venue called the bet midrash (Yiddish, "zal" i.e. "hall").

The institution is headed by its rosh yeshiva, while other senior rabbis are referred to as "Ram" (rosh mesivta or reish metivta); the mashgiach assumes responsibility for students' spiritual development (mashpia, in Hasidic yeshivot). A kollel is headed by its rosh kollel, even when it is part of a yeshiva. A sho'el u'meishiv (Hebrew: שואל ומשיב; lit. transl. ask and he answers; often simply "meishiv", or alternately "nosay v'notayn") is available to consult to students on difficult points in their day's Talmudic studies. The rabbi responsible for the Talmudic shiur is known as a maggid shiur. Students are known as talmidim (sing. talmid). Rav muvhak is sometimes used in reference to one's primary teacher; correspondingly, talmid muvhak may refer to a primary, or outstanding, student.

=== Academic year ===
In most yeshivot, the year is divided into three periods (terms) called zmanim (lit. times; sing. zman). Elul zman starts from the beginning of the Hebrew month of Elul and extends until the end of Yom Kippur. The six-weeks-long semester is the shortest yet most intense session, as it comes before the High Holidays of Rosh Hashanah and Yom Kippur. Winter zman starts after Sukkot and lasts until about two weeks before Passover, a duration of five months (six in a Jewish leap year). Summer zman starts after Passover and lasts until Rosh Chodesh Av or Tisha B'Av, a duration of about three months.

=== Chavruta-style learning ===
Yeshiva students prepare for and review the shiur (lecture) with their chavruta during a study session known as a seder. In contrast to conventional classroom learning, in which a teacher lectures to the student, chavruta-style learning requires the student to analyze and explain the material, point out the errors in their partner's reasoning, and question and sharpen each other's ideas, often arriving at entirely new insights of the meaning of the text. A chavruta is intended to help a student keep their mind focused on the learning, sharpen their reasoning powers, develop their thoughts into words, organize their thoughts into logical arguments, and understand another person's viewpoint. The shiur-based system was innovated at the Telshe yeshiva, where there were five levels.

Chavruta-style learning tends to be animated, as study partners read the Talmudic text and the commentaries aloud to each other, and then analyze, question, debate, and argue their points of view to arrive at an understanding of the text. In the heat of discussion, they may wave their hands, pound the table, or shout at each other. Depending on the size of the yeshiva, dozens or even hundreds of pairs of chavrutas can be heard discussing and debating each other's viewpoints. Students need to learn the ability to block out other discussions in order to focus on theirs.

=== Types ===
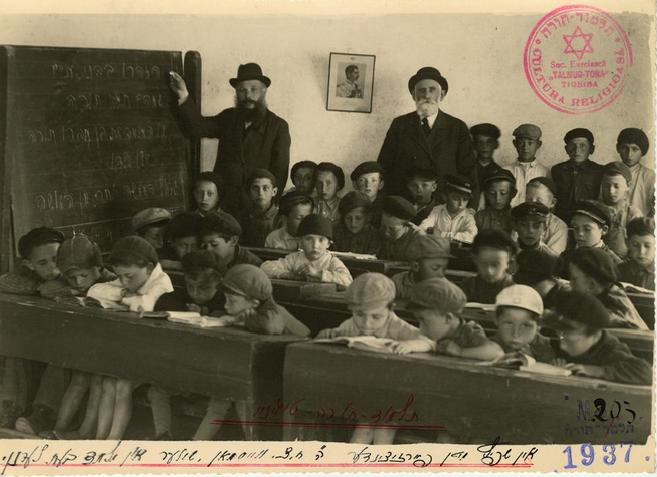
Talmud Torah, Romania, 1937

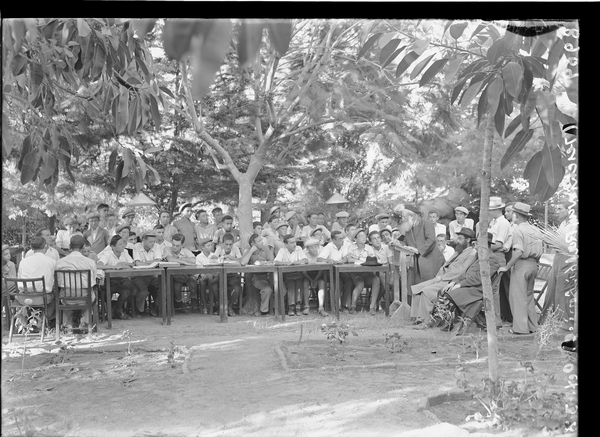
Yeshiva High School, Tel Aviv, 1938

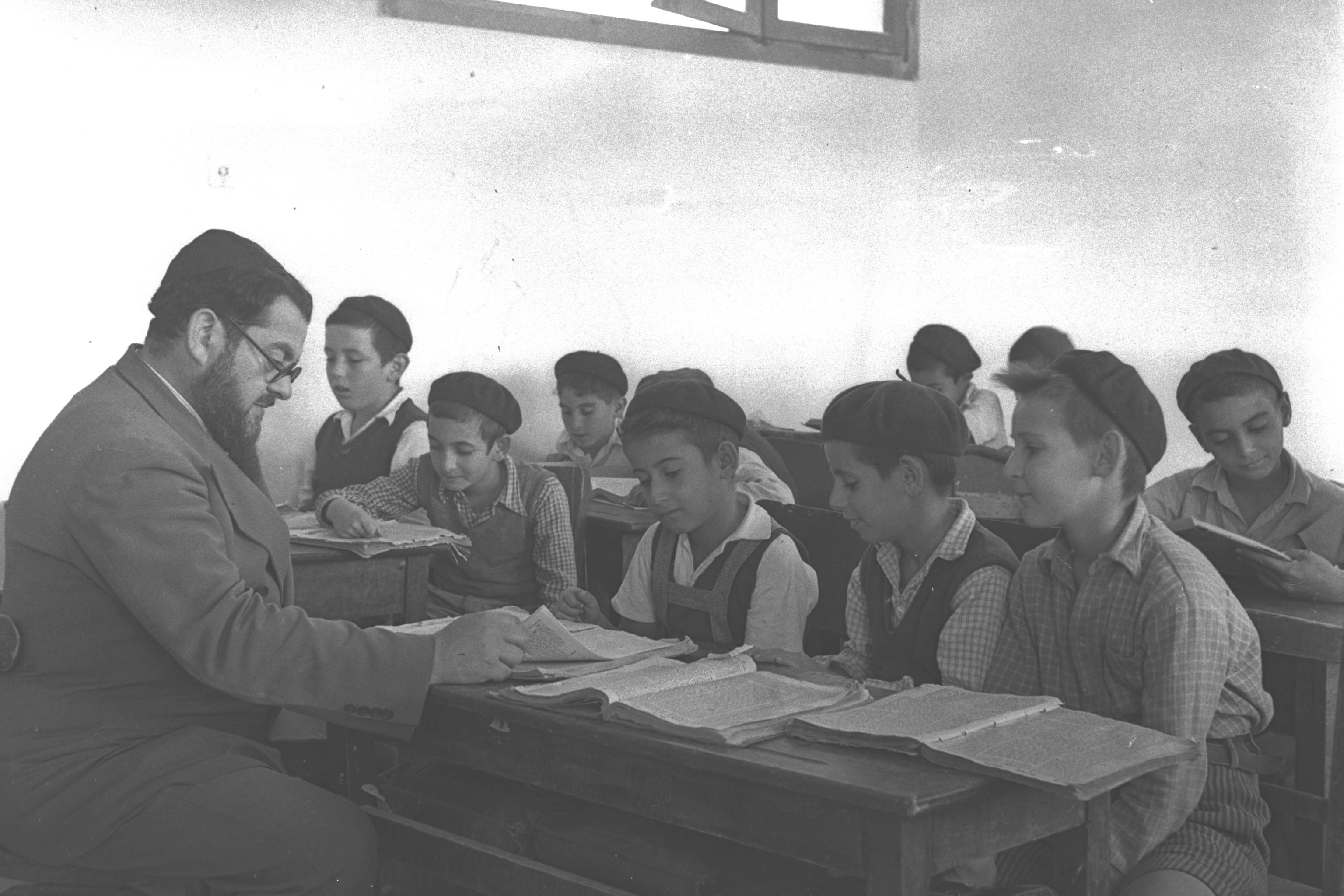
"Cheder"-class in Talmud, Tel Aviv, 1946.

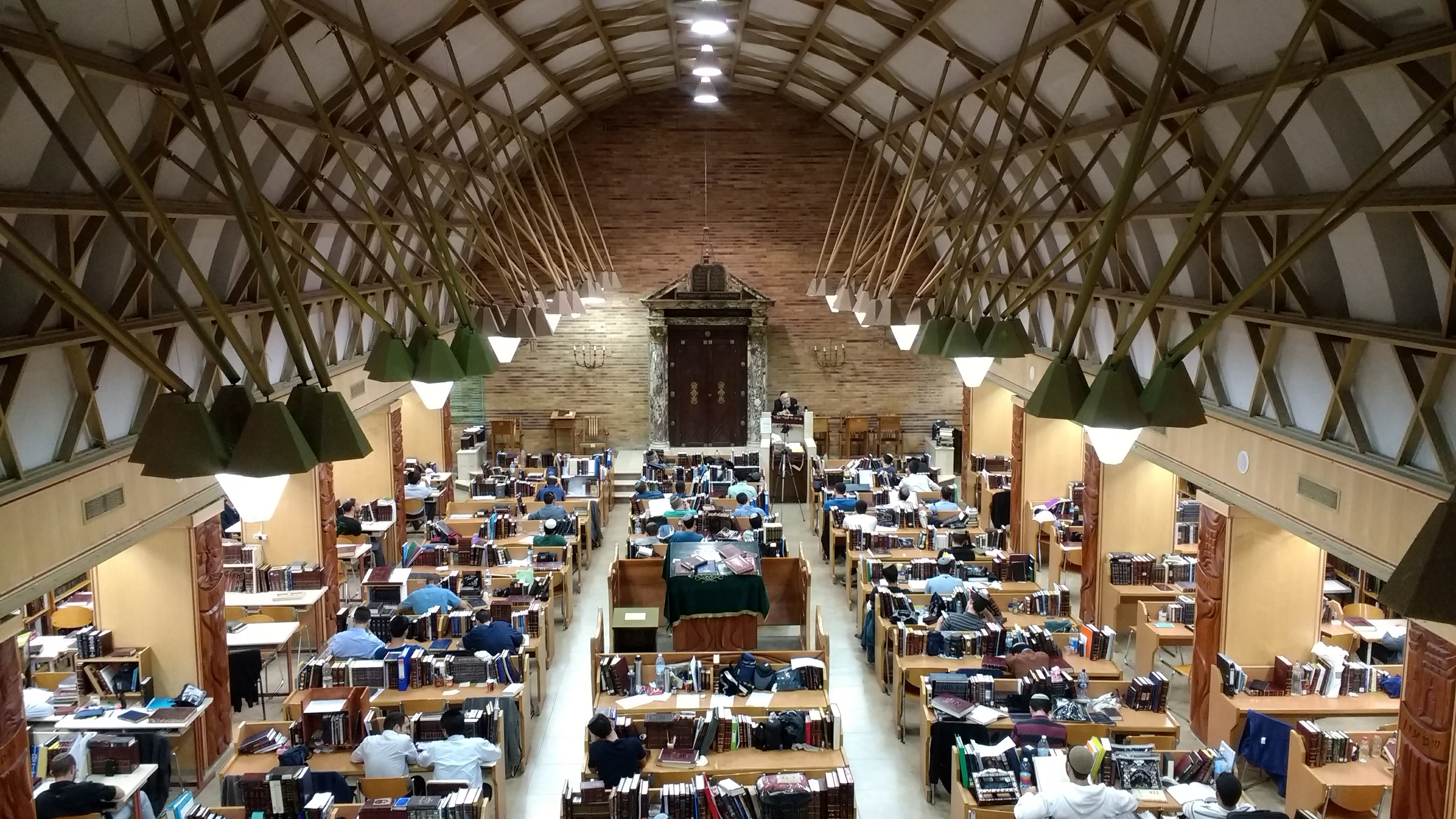
Bet Midrash, Yeshivat Kerem B'Yavneh

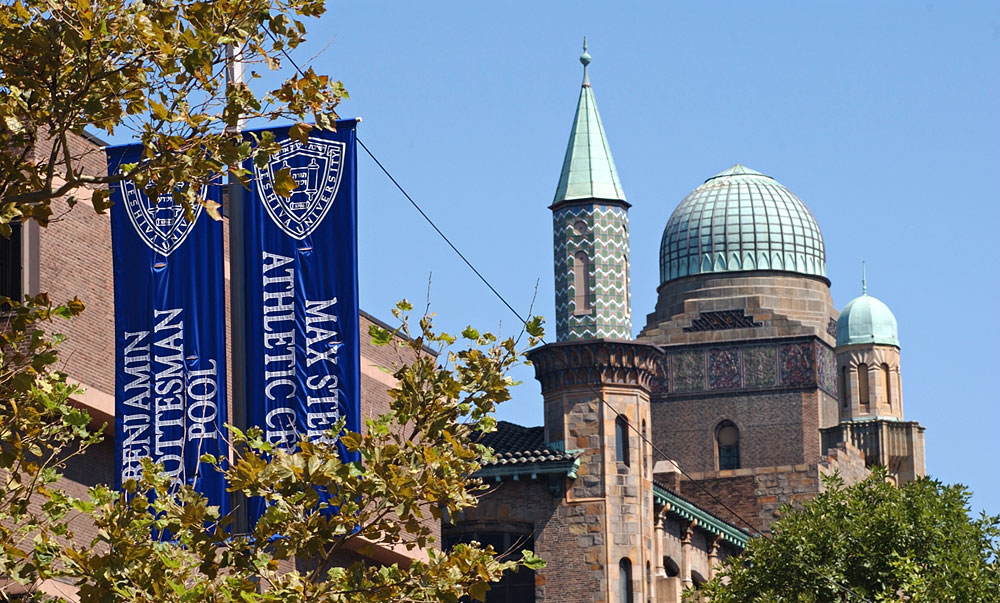
Old Bet Midrash building, Yeshiva University

1. Yeshiva Ketana (junior yeshiva) or "Talmud Torah" – Many Haredi (non-Hasidic and Hasidic) yeshivot ketanot in Israel, and some (primarily Hasidic) in the Diaspora, do not have a secular course of studies, with all students learning Judaic Torah studies full-time.
2. Yeshiva High School – also called Mesivta (Metivta) or Mechina or Yeshiva Ketana, or in Israel, Yeshiva Tichonit – combines the intensive Jewish religious education with a secular high school education. The dual curriculum was pioneered by the Manhattan Talmudical Academy of Yeshiva University (now known as Marsha Stern Talmudical Academy) in 1916; "Aluma" was established in Jerusalem in 1936, and "ha-Yishuv" in Tel Aviv in 1937.
3. Mechina – For Israeli high-school graduates who wish to study for one year before entering the army. In Telshe yeshivas and in Ner Yisroel of Baltimore, the Mesivtas/Yeshiva ketanas are known as Mechinas.
4. Beth midrash – For high school graduates, and is attended from one year to many years, dependent on the career plans and affiliation of the student.
5. Yeshivat Hesder – (Heb. "הסדר", transl. Arrangement) Yeshiva that has an arrangement with the Israel Defense Forces by which the students enlist together in the same unit and, as much as is possible serve in the same unit in the army. Over a period of about 5 years there will be a period of service starting in the second year of about 16 months. There are different variations. The rest of the time will be spent in compulsory study in the yeshiva. The Hesder Yeshiva concept is attributed to Rav Yehuda Amital. The first was Yeshivat Kerem B'Yavneh, established in 1954; the largest is the Hesder Yeshiva of Sderot with over 800 students.
6. Kollel – Yeshiva for married men. The kollel idea has its intellectual roots in the Torah; Mishnah tractate Megillah mentions the law that a town can only be called a "city" if it supports ten men (batlanim) to make up the required quorum for communal learning. It is mostly a modern innovation of 19th-century Europe. A kollel will often be in the same location as the yeshiva.
7. Baal Teshuva yeshivot catering to the needs of the newly Orthodox.

A post-high school for women is generally called a "seminary", or midrasha (plural midrashot) in Israel, and not a yeshiva. (Although there are exceptions such as Prospect Park Yeshiva.) The Haredi Bais Yaakov system was started in 1918 under the guidance of Sarah Schenirer. These institutions provide girls with a Torah education, using a curriculum that skews more toward practical halakha (Jewish law) and the study of Tanakh, rather than Talmud. The curriculum at Religious Zionist and Modern Orthodox midrashot includes some study of Talmud: often Mishnah, sometimes Gemara; in further distinction, curricula generally entail chavruta-based study of the texts of Jewish philosophy, and likewise Tanakh is studied with commentaries. See Midrasha § Curriculum for further discussion.

=== Languages ===
Classes in most Lithuanian and Hasidic yeshivot (throughout the world) are taught in Yiddish; Kol Torah, established in 1939 in Jerusalem and headed by Shlomo Zalman Auerbach for over 40 years, was the first mainstream Haredi yeshiva to teach in Hebrew, as opposed to Yiddish. Sephardi, Modern Orthodox, Zionist, and baal teshuvah yeshivot use Modern Hebrew or the local language. In many American non-Hassidic Yeshivos, the language generally used is English.

Students learn with each other in whatever language they are most proficient, with Hasidic students usually learning in Yiddish, Israeli Lithuanian students in Hebrew, and American Lithuanian students in English.

=== College credit ===
Some yeshivas - especially Modern Orthodox - permit students to attend college. Often there are arrangements for the student to receive credit towards a college degree for their yeshiva studies. Yeshiva University in New York provides a year's worth of credit for yeshiva studies. Institutions with similar arrangements in place include Lander College for Men, Yeshivas Ner Yisroel and Hebrew Theological College.

As above, some American yeshivot in fact award the degrees Bachelor of Talmudic Law (4 years cumulative study), Master of Rabbinic Studies / Master of Talmudic Law (six years), and (at Ner Yisroel) the Doctorate in Talmudic Law (10 years). These degrees are nationally accredited by the Association of Advanced Rabbinical and Talmudic Schools, and may then grant access to graduate programs such as law school.

Non-Orthodox institutions typically integrate a Master's degree into their Ordination Program. The sequence may then be credit-based, and often requires a thesis. Students must also serve an internship, officiating at synagogue services and life-cycle events, and exposed to pastoral care. (Compare shimush, the "apprenticeship" often undertaken by Orthodox students.)

For further discussion on the contemporary integration of secular education, see: Jewish education § Secular education emphasis, Mesivta § Modern-day concept and Controversy over secular education in New York Hasidic schools.

For historical context see: Moses Sofer § Influence against changes in Judaism; Hildesheimer Rabbinical Seminary; Volozhin yeshiva § History; Telshe Yeshiva § History; Vilna Rabbinical School and Teachers' Seminary; Yitzchok Hutner § Rabbinic and teaching career; Torah Lehranstalt § History; Kelm Talmud Torah; Yitzchak Yaacov Reines § Biography.

== Curriculum ==
Torah study at an Orthodox yeshiva comprises the study of rabbinic literature - essentially along the lines established in the Lithuanian Yeshivas as above - principally the Talmud, along with the study of halacha (Jewish law); Musar and Hasidic philosophy are often studied also. In some institutions, classical Jewish philosophy or Kabbalah are formally studied, or the works of individual thinkers (such as Abraham Isaac Kook). See also Rabbi § Contemporary ordination.

Non-Orthodox institutions differ in two respects. First, these offer a synthesis of traditional and critical methods, allowing Jewish texts and tradition to encounter social change and modern scholarship; thus less emphasis is placed on Talmud and Halakha, "but rather on sociology, cultural studies, and modern Jewish philosophy". Second, the curriculum, as above, emphasizes also "the other functions of a modern rabbi such as preaching, counseling, and pastoral work".

Conservative Yeshivot occupy a position midway, in that their training places (significantly) more emphasis on Halakha and Talmud than other non-Orthodox programs. See Conservative halakha.

=== Talmud study ===
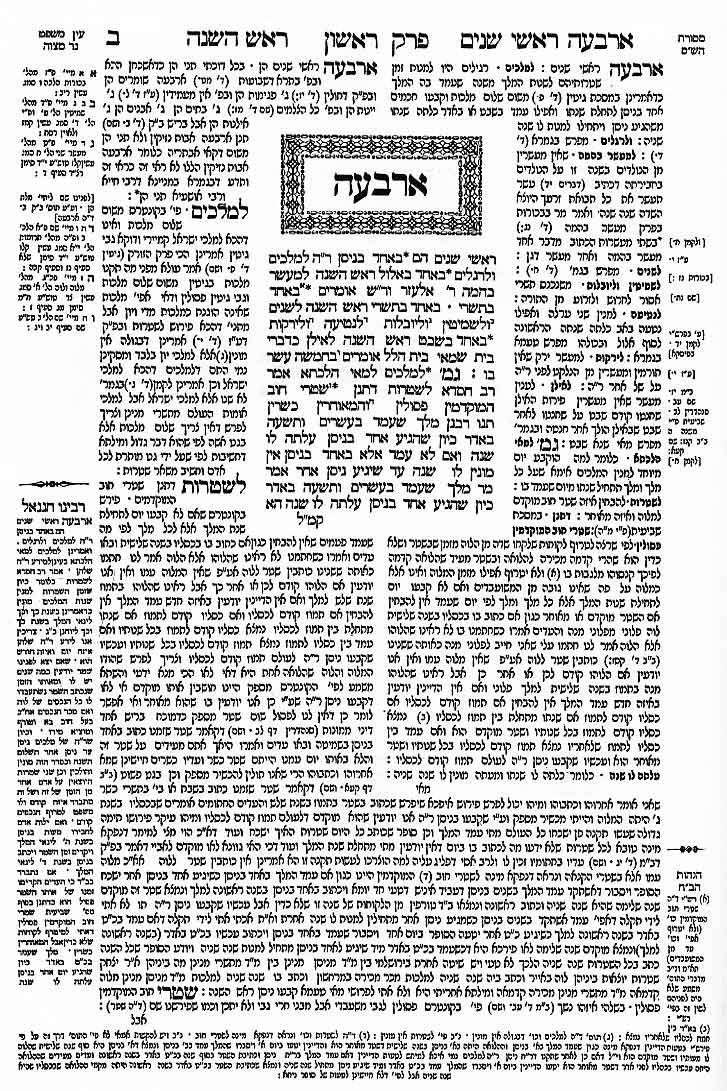
The first page of tractate Rosh Hashanah in the Babylonian Talmud. The center column contains the Talmud text, starting with a section of Mishnah. The Gemara begins on the eighth line, indicated by גמ׳. The large blocks of text on either side are the Tosafot and Rashi commentaries. Other notes and cross references are in the margins. The "standard" commentaries - Rosh, Rif, Mordechai, Maharam, Maharsha, Maharshal - are appended to the tractate, while other major commentators are published separately.

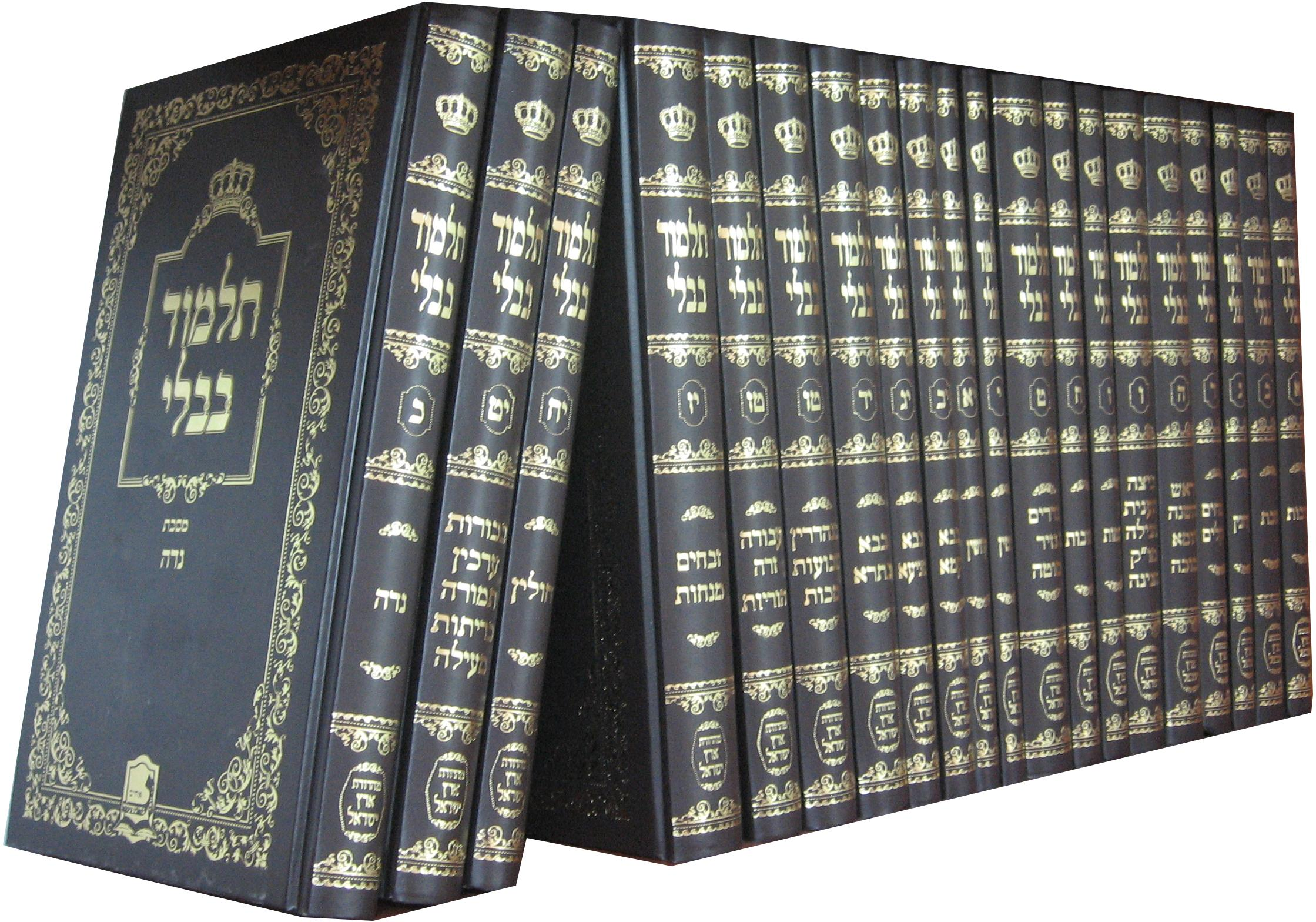
A full set of the Babylonian Talmud

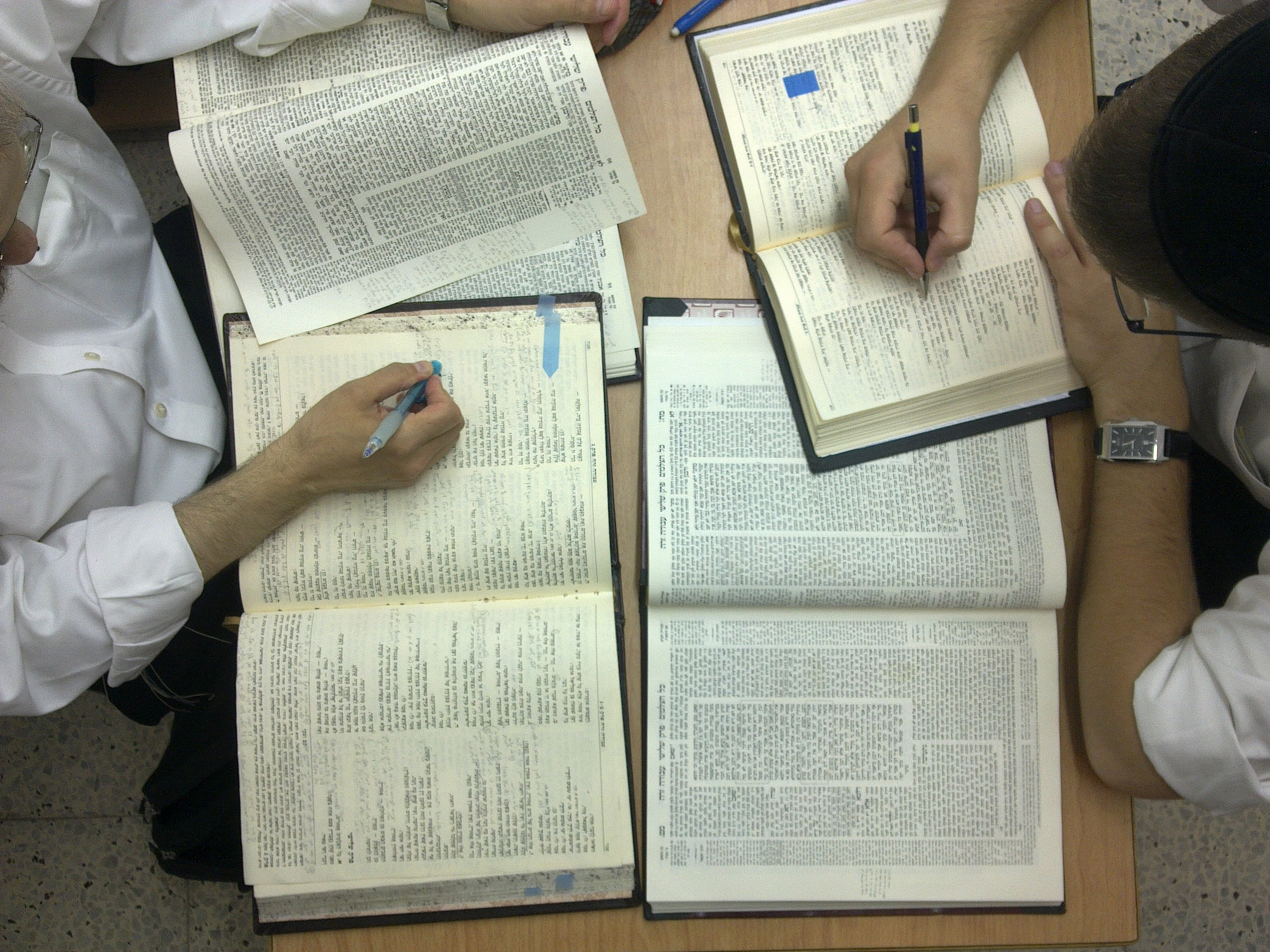
Chavrusas learning beki'ut, recording their summary of each sugya alongside its Mishnah

In a typical Orthodox yeshiva, the main emphasis is on Talmud study, and particularly on its analytic component, Gemara:- an often intensive "dialectic give and take" (Aramaic: shakla v'tarya) where the cases brought in the underlying Mishnah are analyzed, thereby explicating all inherent teachings and insights. For discussion of the nature, structure and characteristics of this activity, see Gemara § Argumentation and debate and § Gemara and Mishnah.

Generally, two parallel Talmud streams are covered during a zman (trimester). The first is iyyun, or in-depth study (variants described below), often confined to selected legally focused tractates with an emphasis on analytical skills and close reference to the classical commentators; and where, characteristically, the analysis permutes and compounds as commentaries are introduced. The second stream, beki'ut ("expertise"), seeks to build general knowledge of the Talmud. In some Hasidic yeshivas, girsa ("text"), is the term used for beki'ut, but may also incorporate an element of memorization.

In the yeshiva system of Talmudic study, the "undergraduate" yeshivot focus on the mesechtohs (tractates) that cover civil jurisprudence and monetary law (Nezikin) and those dealing with contract and marital law (Nashim); through them, the student can best master the proper technique of Talmudic analysis, and in parallel, the halakhic application of Talmudic principles. With these mastered, the student goes on to other areas of the Talmud. Tractates Berachot, Sukkah, Pesachim and Shabbat are often included. Sometimes tractates dealing with an upcoming religious holiday are studied before and during the holiday (e.g. Shabbat 21a–23b for Chanukah, Tractate Megilla for Purim, etc.).

Works initially studied to clarify the Talmudic text are the commentary by Rashi, and the related work Tosafot, a parallel analysis and running critique of the former. The integration of Talmud, Rashi and Tosafot, is considered as foundational – and prerequisite – to further analysis (in fact, this combination is sometimes referred to by its own acronym, "gefet" גפ״ת – Gemara, perush Rashi, Tosafot). The super-commentaries by "Maharshal", "Maharam" and "Maharsha" address the three components together: being at a further remove from the underlying Talmudic debate, these - with their interplay - constitute a higher-order of analysis.

At more advanced levels, additional mefarshim (commentators) are similarly studied: other rishonim, from the 11th to 14th centuries, as well as acharonim, from later generations. There are two main schools of rishonim, from France and from Spain, who will hold different interpretations and understandings of the Talmud (see also Hachmei Provence); the acharonim collate and clarify these opinions, and provide, then, a further layer of analysis. Widely referenced here are the "Meiri", "Ramban", "Rashba", "Ritva", "Ran" and "Rim", as well as the parallel Shitah Mekubezet compilation.

At these levels, students link the Talmudic discussion to codified law – particularly Mishneh Torah (i.e. Maimonides), Arba'ah Turim and Shulchan Aruch – by studying, also, the halakha-focused commentaries of Asher ben Jehiel, Isaac Alfasi and Mordechai ben Hillel, respectively referred to as "Rosh", "Rif", and the "Mordechai". Here, too, any differences give rise to further analysis - especially where these have implications re practice - and the underlying Talmudic opinions, and the other commentaries, are in turn revisited.

As the level of the shiur progresses, so the student must integrate more of these commentaries into their analysis of the sugya (loosely, Talmudic "unit of analysis"), simultaneously considering both the specific "chidush", i.e. novel contribution, as well as the "nafka mina", any implication re practical-halakha. This iyyun will generally take one of the following forms, each the "derech ha-limud" or "way of learning" of the Yeshiva (see the Hebrew article "Approaches to Learning Talmud"):

- At the higher levels, in many Lithuanian influenced Yeshivot, the highly analytic "Brisker method" is employed, as mentioned. The method - often referred to simply as lomdus - seeks to identify the principles underlying each commentator's approach, abstracting beyond the context of the specific sugya, by placing each within a categorical structure (the best known of these "binaries" being cheftza / gavra, "object" / "person").
- Elsewhere, and generally, the approach is more traditional: Students work through each sugya in light of the various rishonim, successively specifying and understanding - and if possible, reconciling - differences (legal and conceptual) between these, such that "every particular contributes to the clarification of the others." Through this, the study builds and deepens the concepts and principles arising from the tractate; sometimes emphasizing the buildout of the Halacha. Throughout, an important simultaneous requirement is that the "simple interpretation", peshat, of the underlying sugyas must maintain.
- Many Yeshivot proceed aliba dehilchasa (אליבא דהלכתא, Seph. pronunciation, dehilchata; lit. "according to the Law"), where the learning focuses more on the Halachik-rules that develop from the sugya, delineating how the opinions of the rishonim and acharonim relate to practice. There are two sub-approaches: The first, often the approach taken at Sephardic Yeshivot, analyzes the sugya as the source of the halacha, understanding how it inheres in each rishon, and is undertaken even for topics with limited application (prototypical are ir nidachat and ben sorer umoreh). The second, often applied when the sugya is studied by semikha students - see following section - especially focuses on the implication re practical-halacha, the above nafka mina, of each commentary, somewhat limiting consequent theoretical and abstract discussion.
- Some Yeshivot – such as Birkat Moshe – particularly emphasize the Rambam, analyzing the sugya in light of the Mishneh Torah and its numerous commentaries. (Brisker yeshivot invariably reference Rambam also: the Mishneh Torah covers all of halacha, and thus provides a consistent reference for the treatment of other rishonim; see Chiddushei Rabbeinu Chaim.)

The Rosh Yeshiva gives the most senior shiur. It is here that the student consolidates the yeshiva's approach to iyyun, i.e. its derech ha-limud; see Rosh yeshiva § Role. At many yeshivot, students are thus expected to learn in this shiur for at least two years before proceeding to Kollel or semikha study (and with the Rosh Yeshiva's sanction). The Rosh Yeshiva also delivers the weekly shiur klali ("comprehensive lecture"), which sums up the week's learning, and revisits a selected topic or concept in further detail; this is attended by all levels, and will often have its own marei mekomot.

Typically, boys begin their study of Talmud in late elementary school, initially studying Mishnah, the component of Talmud where, as outlined above, the underlying "cases" are presented. (At this stage, they have completed their survey of Chumash, with these cases expanding on the legal precepts there; see below.) In early middle school, gemara, the analytic component, is introduced; by late high school some are able to work with Tosafot. Some systems more closely follow Pirkei Avot ch 5:21 as a guideline; where Mishna-study begins at age 10, and Gemara at 15. See Zilberman Method for further discussion.

=== Jewish law ===
Page of Shulchan Aruch; Even Ha'ezer section, laws of Ketubot. The central block contains the law as presented by Yosef Karo, interspersed with the glosses of the Rema in a "cursive" script and preceded by "הגה"; surrounding this are the primary commentators for the section (here, Beit Shmuel and Chelkat Mechokek; on Yoreh Deah, "Shakh" and "Taz"), and on the margins are various other commentaries and cross references.

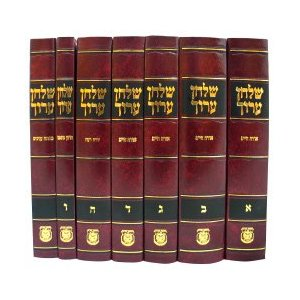
Shulchan Aruch HaRav

Generally, a period is devoted to the study of practical halakha ("Halakha LeMa'aseh"), emphasizing application as opposed to derivation. The text most commonly studied in Ashkenazi yeshivot is the Mishnah Berurah, a commentary on the Orach Chayim section of Shulchan Aruch originally published between 1884 and 1907. In Sephardic yeshivot, the Shulchan Aruch itself is more commonly studied, along with the Bet Yosef commentary; the Yalkut Yosef and Kaf Hachaim are also often studied - similar to Mishnah Berurah - while Ben Ish Hai is a standard reference. In Chabad yeshivot, emphasis is placed upon study of Shulchan Aruch HaRav. In their first year, students are encouraged to work through the Kitzur Shulchan Aruch, so as to survey all areas of applicable halacha, preparatory to further study (and to consolidate their prior, high school, knowledge); this is also often the practice outside of Chabad. More advanced students, additionally and similarly, review the Mishneh Torah through its daily study cycle (this is often outside of any seder), here including halachot relating to, for example, the Temple.

Students in Semikha (Rabbinic ordination) programs, and often those in kollel, devote the largest portion of their schedule to halakha. The focus is on in-depth, source-based study of those areas where (community) Rabbis will typically be asked "shaylas", i.e. halachic questions: the testing invariably covers Kashrut (referred to as "Issur v'Heter"), usually Shabbat, often Niddah, sometimes Avelut (mourning) and/or marriage. This study, typically of two to four year's duration, encompasses a detailed analysis of the halakha in the Arba'ah Turim and Bet Yosef - section Yoreh Deah - through its final presentation in the Shulchan Aruch, with its major commentaries (especially "Shakh" and "Taz"), complemented by a survey of key She'elot u-Teshuvot (responsa), recent and historical. The analysis, in turn, is built on a detailed knowledge of all relevant Talmudic sugyas, which are studied accordingly within the schedule, emphasizing the legal commentaries mentioned; see Talmud § Legal interpretation. Students preparing for Dayanut, similarly focus on the Halakha as it pertains to monetary and property disputes; the basis here is the Choshen Mishpat section of Shulchan Aruch, and often parts of Even Ha'ezer, with the Gemara from seder Nezikin. This study may span up to a decade.

Given the connection of Halakha to Talmud, students in an Orthodox Semikha program will have a thorough background in Talmud, typically having spent at least four preceding years in Yeshiva; Kollel students likewise. (See Rabbi § Orthodox and Modern Orthodox Judaism.) During the morning seder, Semikha students thus continue their Talmud studies, learning the same masechet as the rest of the Yeshiva, often independently, but in many yeshivot, participating in the Rosh Yeshiva's shiur. (Rabbis, then, will have been direct "students of the Rosh Yeshiva" for their final four, or more, years of study.)

=== Ethics, mysticism and philosophy ===
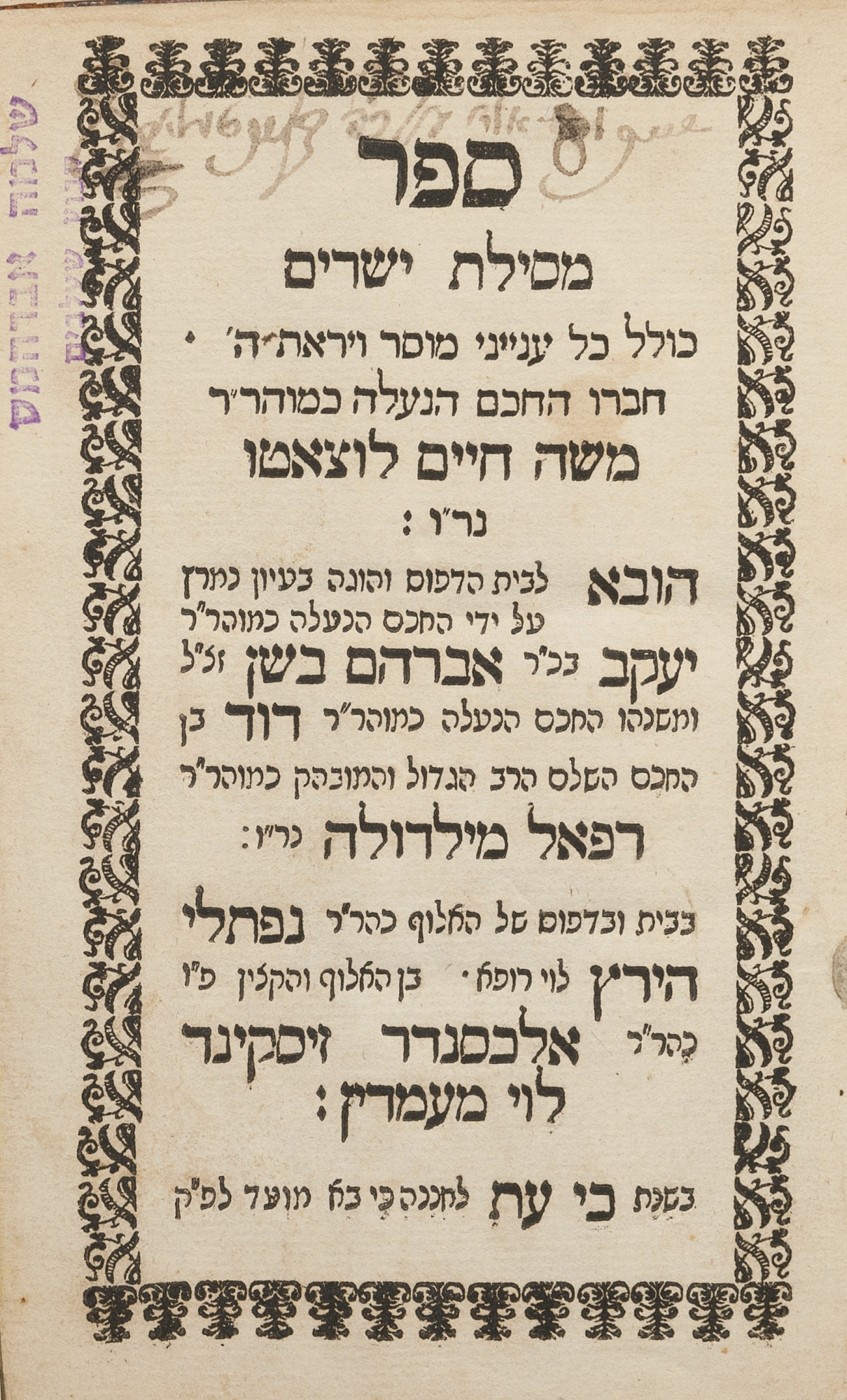
Cover of the first edition of Mesillat Yesharim.

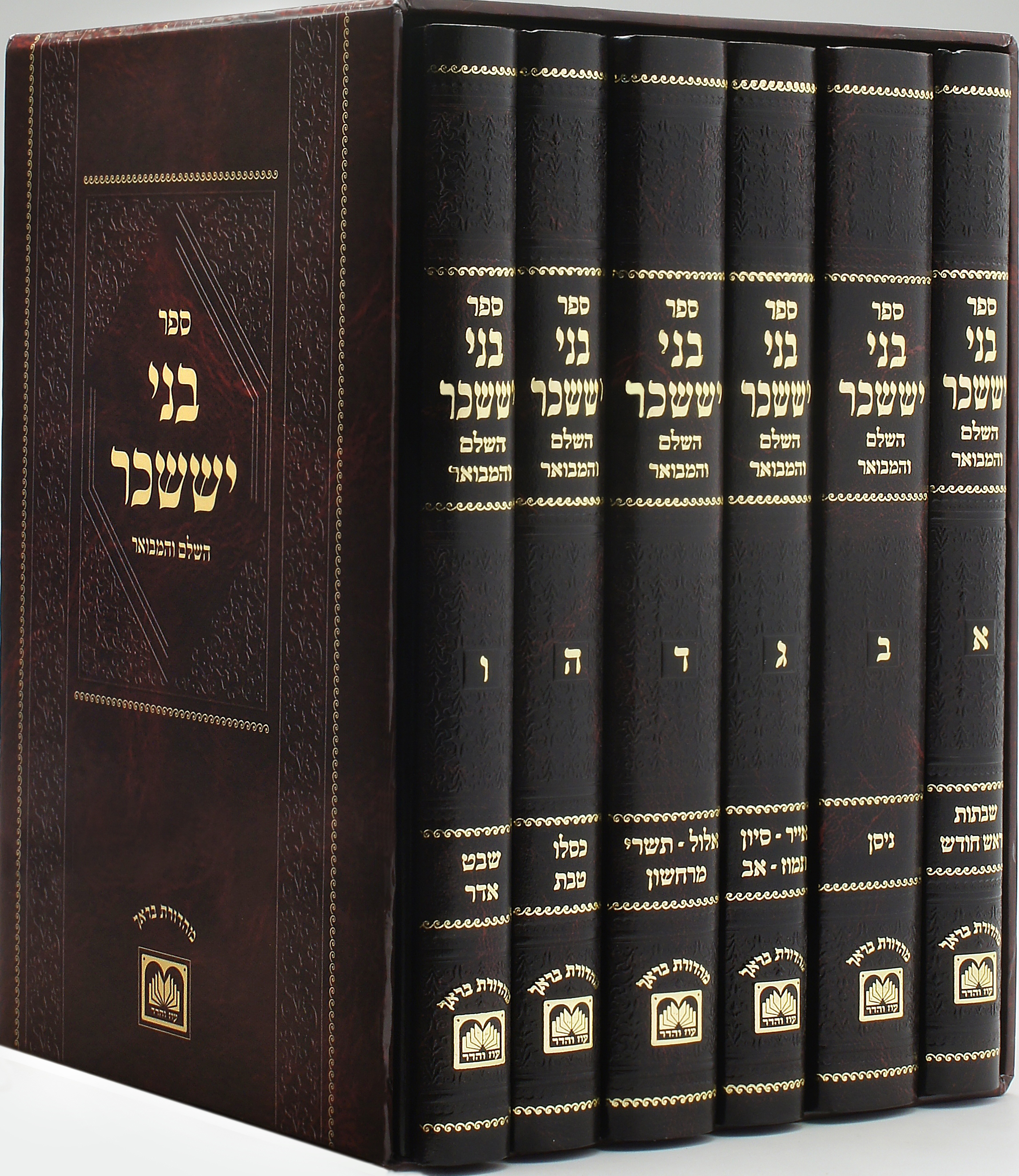
Contemporary print of the Chassidic work Bnei Yissoschar

Haredi Yeshivot (with the exception of Brisker yeshivot) typically devote a seder to mussar (ethics and character development). The preeminent text studied is the Mesillat Yesharim ("Path of the Just") of Moshe Chaim Luzzatto. Other works of mussar literature studied include:

- Orchot Tzaddikim ("Paths of the Righteous"); its authorship and time of writing is uncertain, but as it quotes Maimonides, it was written some time after his works were disseminated.
- Chovot ha-Levavot ("Duties of the Hearts") by Bahya ibn Paquda.
- Ma'alot ha-Middot ("Benefit [of good character] traits") by Jehiel Anav
- Mishnat R' Aharon, Mussar Lectures on many topics by Aharon Kotler.
- Mikhtav me-Eliyahu, the works of Eliyahu Eliezer Dessler.
- Tomer Devorah by Moses Cordovero.
- Sichos Mussar by Chaim Leib Shmuelevitz.
- Pele Yoetz by Eliezer Papo.
- Kav ha-Yashar by Tzvi Hirsch Kaidanover
- Kad ha-Kemach by Bahya ben Asher

As above, these sessions focus the student on self-understanding and introspection, internalizing the spiritual aims of Judaism, and developing the character-traits, or middos, appropriately. Topics in applied Jewish ethics, such as the "laws of speech", are often studied separately.

Hasidic yeshivot study the mystical, spiritual works of Hasidic philosophy (Chassidus). These draw on the earlier esoteric theology of Kabbalah, but articulates it in terms of inner psychological awareness and personal analogies. This study thus makes Jewish mysticism accessible and tangible, so that it inspires emotional dveikus (cleaving to God) and embeds a deep spiritual element in daily Jewish life; it thereby serves a similar purpose to mussar, but through different means and with different contributions to intellectual and emotional life. Chabad yeshivot, for example, study the Tanya, the Likutei Torah, and the voluminous works of the Rebbes of Chabad for an hour and a half each morning, before prayers, and an hour and a half in the evening.

As mentioned, Sephardi yeshivot often incorporate study of selected Kabbalistic texts into their curriculum – standard texts, as well as works by Yosef Hayyim, Yehuda Fatiyah and Yaakov Chaim Sofer. Kabbalistic sources are brought in halachik works such as Kaf Hachaim and Ben Ish Hai – and are then studied indirectly also; see Sephardic law and customs § Lurianic Kabbalah.

In Hesder, Religious Zionist and Modern Orthodox yeshivot, Hashkafa ("worldview") or Machshavah ("Jewish thought") is taught formally. Shiurim here systematically cover the classic topics of Jewish philosophy - coupled with their application to contemporary issues - in light of the leading works in these areas, with the treatment mirroring Talmud-study as above. (Indeed, the maggid shiur may refer to the topic in question as "our sugya".) These works — Kuzari, Moreh Nevukhim, Sefer ha-Ikkarim, Emunot ve-Deot, Derech Hashem, Nefesh Ha-Chaim, and others — in turn draw on Talmudic-Aggadah / Midrash, and on Tanach (see below). Hesder yeshivot additionally devote specific time to the writings of Abraham Isaac Kook, "Rav Kook", who articulated a unique personal blend of mysticism, creative exegesis and philosophy (as well as to Torat Eretz Yisrael generally). The Modern Orthodox, similarly, study the works of Joseph B. Soloveitchik, "Rav Soloveitchik". Hasidic philosophy and Mussar are also often taught; and Maharal may have a dedicated shiur. Machshava is also a focus-area of many Midrashot.

Some Haredi and Hasidic yeshivas also include formal study of Hashkafa, especially at ba'al teshuva focused institutions; many Semikha programs likewise, particularly those with an outreach, or kiruv, component. Regardless, students here typically study the major works independent of a shiur.

=== Torah and Bible study ===
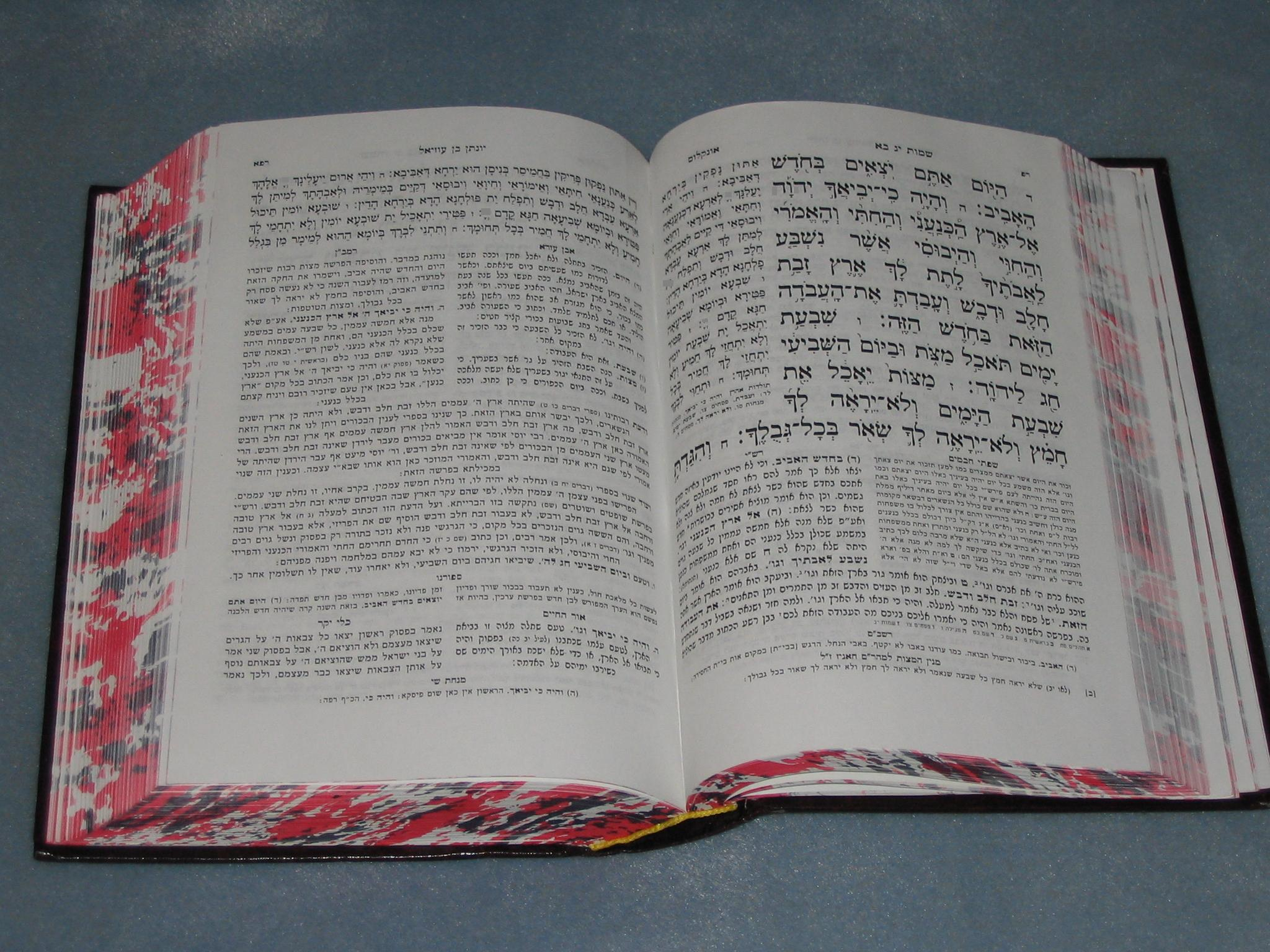
Chumash with Mikraot Gedolot. The Torah text is the block of large, bold letters; adjacent to it is the Targum Onkelos with Rashi's commentary below (with the related supercommentary Siftei Chachamim alongside). Ramban, Ibn Ezra and Sforno are on the facing page; other commentaries and references are in the margins.

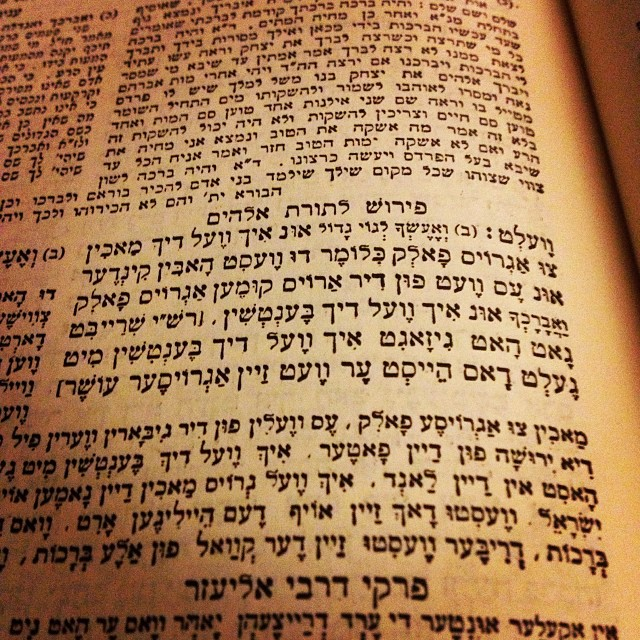
Chumash with Yiddish translation

Intensive study of Chumash (Torah) with the commentary of Rashi is stressed and taught in all elementary grades. In Haredi and Hasidic yeshivas, this is often done with Yiddish translations. The rest of the Tanach (Hebrew Bible; acronym: Torah and Nach = "Torah, Nevi'im u'Ketuvim"; "Torah, Prophets and Writings") is usually taught through high school, although less intensively.

In Yeshivot, thereafter, Chumash, and especially Nach, are studied less directly. Yeshiva students typically follow the practice of Shnayim mikra ve-echad targum, independently reviewing the upcoming parashah (weekly Torah portion) twice in the original Hebrew and once in Targum Onkelos (an Aramaic translation), together with Rashi's commentary. Students often also study Ramban's commentary, functioning in relation to Rashi here, somewhat as Tosafot above; less frequently, other commentaries from the Mikraot Gedolot edition are reviewed. Students may similarly study Nach independently (often using the Metzudos commentary); usually, Tanach is not taught per se, with exceptions being the five Megilloth and Tehillim. The Rosh Yeshiva delivers a weekly shiur on the parashah, exploring a particular question or theme, with a related ethical or hashkafic teaching; this is often open to the public.

At Hesder, Religious Zionist and Modern Orthodox yeshivot, the study of Chumash and Nach continues in parallel with Talmud study. These institutions offer formal shiurim in many, if not all, of the books of Nevi'im and Ketuvim. These are often structured by level, similar to Talmud study, where the text, and its overall structure, is then analyzed in light of the various commentaries and Midrashim, typically complementing the Machshavah shiurim. (See further re this approach under Yeshivat Har Etzion.) Here, the commentaries by Ramban, Abarbanel, "Rabbeinu Behaye", "Rav Hirsch", "Or Hachaim", "Radak" and Maharal (Gur Aryeh) provide much philosophical content. The Sefer ha-Chinuch, which offers a systematic legal and philosophic discussion of the commandments, is similarly studied. (The related Minchat Chinuch is often referenced in legal-focused Talmud shiurim.) More recent commentaries especially studied are "Netziv" and "Malbim", which tend to integrate the Written and Oral Torah, often using Talmudic and Midrashic sources to explain Biblical text. The contemporary Daat Mikra (completed 2003) discusses literary structure, while incorporating geographical, historical and archeological data. Intensive study of Tanach, as for Machshava, is likewise a feature of many Midrashot.

== See also ==
- Bais Yaakov
- Jewish day school
- List of rabbinical schools
- Mesivta
- Religious school
- Yeshivish
