= Yosef Yitzchok Lerner =

Israeli rabbi

Lerner in 2013

Yosef Yitzchok Lerner (Hebrew: יוסף יצחק לרנר) is a Hareidi, American-born, Rabbi in Jerusalem who is known for writing several popular books on Jewish law and custom. He also heads Beis Midrash L'Horaah Toras Shlomo, a Kollel for rabbinic ordination.

== Background ==
Lerner was born to Shmuel Yechiel Lerner a Holocaust survivor from Hungary, in Forest Hills, NY. His mother, Grace Lerner, was born and raised in Newark, New Jersey. At a young age, the family relocated to Chicago, Illinois. As a teenager, he studied in the Telz Yeshiva in Chicago and, later, at the Yeshiva of Rabbi Dovid Soloveitchik in Jerusalem. He also studied at Beth Medrash Govoha in Lakewood, NJ under the tutelage of Rabbi Shneur Kotler.

He married a daughter of the Mohel of Jerusalem, Rabbi Yosef Dovid Weissberg and learned in the Kollel of Shaar Hashamayim Yeshiva under the leadership of the leading posek of his time, Rabbi Shlomo Zalman Auerbach.

He studied Halacha as an apprentice to Rabbi Moshe Halberstam whom he views as his mentor in terms of halachik decisions. He also served as a lecturer for Aish HaTorah's Halacha program.

After leaving his position at Aish HaTorah, Lerner started a Kollel in which he teaches and prepares English-speaking students for rabbinic ordination. The honorary president of his Kollel was originally Rabbi Lerner's mentor, Rabbi Moshe Halberstam, who signed the rabbinic ordination. After Rabbi Halberstam's death in 2006, the mantel of the Kollel's honorary leadership was passed to Rabbi Moshe Sternbuch who co-signed the Rabbinic ordination with Lerner, until other circumstances in his life caused him to pull back from involvement in other projects in 2014. Since then Rabbi Avraham Yitzchok Ulman of the Badatz Eidah Hachareides has taken over honorary leadership and co-sign the Rabbinic ordination.

== Works ==
- Shemiras HaGuf VaHaNefesh (שמירת הגוף והנפש) – Laws and customs about physical and spiritual well-being This two-volume work has been printed many times since its original printing in the 1980s. Later editions of this work contain a special section in mystical Chidushei Halacha and remedies for remembrance which is dedicated as a tribute to Lerner's teacher Rabbi Shnuer Kotler.
- Sefer Habayis (ספר הבית) – Book of Jewish law and customs for the Jewish home, especially the laws and customs of the Hanukat HaBayit (housewarming celebration) Due to its popularity, this book was translated into English to reach a broader audience. (Sefer Habayis: Jewish law and custom for the house and home, 2001, Feldheim: ISBN 9781583304440)
- Shegiyos Mi Yavin (שגיאות מי יבין) – This award-winning two-volume work is a compendium of halachik rulings in situations where mistakes have occurred in ritual performances and how to rectify those situations.

== Controversy ==
A letter of Rav Sholomo Zalman Auerbach in Rabbi Lerner's book played a limited role in the affair surrounding the controversy of the works of Natan Slifkin because in one of his works, Lerner published a letter penned by Rabbi Shlomo Zalman Auerbach which discusses the correlation between rabbinic teachings and contemporary scientific knowledge.
