= Shimon Eider =

Shimon D. Eider (December 2, 1938 - September 28, 2007) was an Orthodox rabbi and a posek (decisor of Jewish law). R. Eider, a graduate of Yeshiva University High School for Boys, was a pioneer in the field of Jewish law in English. He authored several texts. He received his rabbinic ordination from Rabbi Moshe Feinstein. He was a longtime resident of Lakewood Township, New Jersey and an esteemed member of the advanced Kollel of Beth Medrash Govoha where he was a student of Rabbi Aharon Kotler. He was frequently consulted as an expert on the construction of eruvin and he was also a trailblazer in kashrut. Eider died on September 28, 2007.

Eider was best known for his pioneering works in Jewish law. He was among the first to write handbooks of practical Halacha for the English speaking public. Many of the conventions he instituted - for example, writing the main text in English with Hebrew footnotes on the same page - became standard in the field of English works of Jewish law. Eider developed a style of writing intended to be clear for the new student while still useful for the scholar. Eider frequently consulted with major rabbinic authorities in the writing of his books, as seen from the countless footnotes. His style of writing is the foundation of most English works of Halacha published today.

== Works ==
- Halachos of Chanukah
- Halachos of Niddah (Ritual Purity) (two volumes published)
- Halachos of Pesach
- Halachos of Shabbos
- Halachos of Tefillin
- Summary of Halachos of Tefillin
- Summary of Halachos of Eruv (Shabbath)
- Summary of Halachos of the Four Minim (Sukkoth)
- Summary of Halachos of the Three Weeks (Month of Av)
