= Yehudah Jacobs =

Mashgiach ruchani of Beth Medrash Govoha

Rabbi Yehudah Jacobs רב יהודה ג'ייקובס

Personal life
- Born: c. 1935 Cologne, Germany
- Died: April 27, 2020 Lakewood Township, New Jersey, U.S
- Spouse: Ruthie Jacobs (m. 1985, died) Esther Jacobs
- Education: Beth Medrash Govoha

Religious life
- Religion: Judaism

Yehudah Jacobs ( c. 1935 – April 27, 2020) was an American rabbi who served as the mashgiach ruchani of Beth Medrash Govoha.

== Biography ==
Jacobs was born c. 1935 to Rabbi Asher and Esther Jacobs in Cologne, Germany. He studied in Beth Medrash Govoha in Lakewood Township, New Jersey starting in the late 1950s under Rabbi Aharon Kotler. He married his first wife, Ruthie, and they settled in Lakewood. He was soon appointed the mashgiach of Beth Medrash Govoha alongside Rabbi Nosson Meir Wachtfogel, a position he held for many years. After his first wife died (c. 1985), Jacobs married his second wife, Esther. In 2010, he moved to Israel, where he stayed for a few years, all the while keeping up with the Lakewood Yeshiva. He later returned to Lakewood.

On April 27, 2020, he died of COVID-19 in Lakewood.
