= Eli Baruch Shulman =

Rabbi Eli Baruch Shulman (born October 1959) is a Rosh Yeshiva at Yeshiva University's affiliated Rabbi Isaac Elchanan Theological Seminary (RIETS) and a lecturer at its Yeshiva Program/Mazer School of Talmudic Studies (MYP), where he holds the Rabbi Henry H. Guterman chair in Talmud.

== Education ==
Rabbi Shulman received his rabbinic ordination from Rabbi Yaakov Joffen, head of the Beth Yosef Novardok yeshiva. He studied under Rabbi Aharon Lichtenstein at Yeshivat Har Etzion, Rabbi Nochum Partzovitz of the Mir Yeshiva in Jerusalem, Rabbi Yechiel Michel Feinstein of Bnei Brak, and Rabbi Shneur Kotler at Beth Medrash Govoha in Lakewood, NJ, where he was a study partner (chavrusa) with Rabbi Dovid Schustal.

== Career ==
He is the rabbi of the Young Israel of Midwood and has served as both author and editor of a number of volumes of the Artscroll Schottenstein edition of the Babylonian Talmud. He is also the author of eleven scholarly works on Talmudic themes: Binyan Av (1985) and Yesamach Av (10 volumes), as well as a commentary on the Haggadah.
