= Eli Stefansky =

American-Israeli lecturer (born 1972)

- אלי סטפנסקי
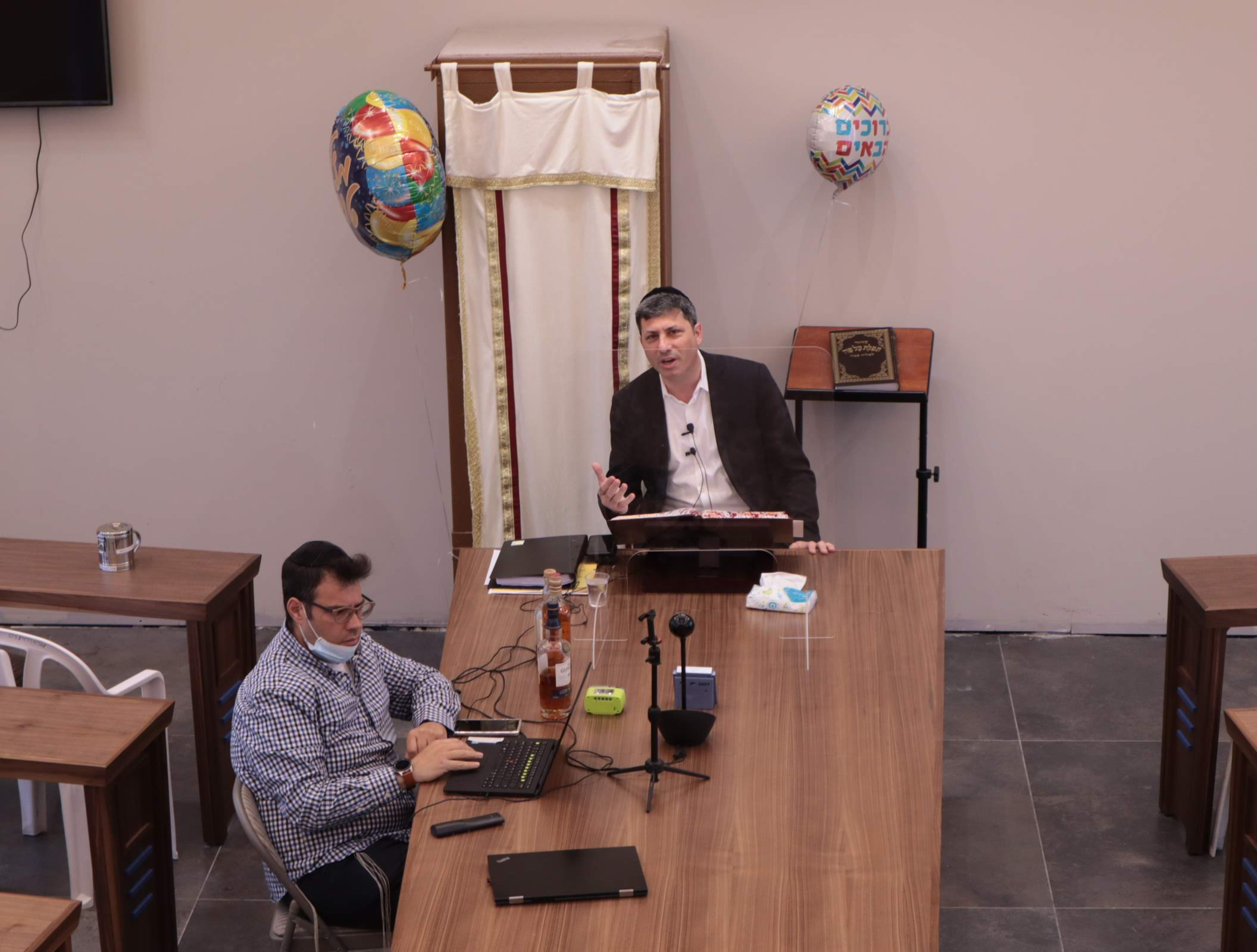
- Born: November 21, 1972 (age 53); Lakewood Township, New Jersey
- Education: Yeshiva Rabbeinu Chaim Berlin
- Website: www.mercazdafyomi.com

Eliyahu Stefansky (Hebrew: אליהו סטפנסקי; born November 21, 1972) is the founder of Mercaz Daf Yomi in Ramat Beit Shemesh, Israel, whose daf yomi broadcasts are the most popular shiurim in the world.

== Early life and education ==
Stefansky was born in Lakewood Township, New Jersey, to Rabbi Yaakov and Rebbetzin Ruthie Stefansky. He is the oldest of seven children. He grew up in Far Rockaway, Queens, where he attended Yeshiva Darchei Torah. In the fifth grade, his family made aliyah, moving to Bnei Brak, Israel, and Stefansky studied at the Ponevezh Yeshiva under Michel Yehuda Lefkowitz. After three years, the Stefanskys returned to the United States, and Stefansky attended Yeshiva Gedola of Passaic. Stefansky returned to Israel to study at the Mir Yeshiva. After his return from Israel he attended Yeshiva Rabbi Chaim Berlin.

Stefansky began his career in Chicago as an electrician, plumber, and carpenter to enter into real estate. On the side, he maintained a catering business, working about 100 weddings per year. At one wedding in 2005, a real estate broker in Indianapolis offered Stefansky the option to purchase 2,000 apartments. This became PrimeQuest. In 2013, at the age of 41, Stefansky moved with his wife and five children to Ramat Beit Shemesh, Israel.

== Career as educator ==
Stefansky began a daf yomi shiur in Chicago that grew to 45 students. He also started the "8 Minute Daf" video series that grew to 2,000 subscribers in 3 months.

In 2018, Stefansky founded the Mercaz Daf Yomi in Ramat Beit Shemesh, from which he broadcasts daily lectures of the daf yomi. He dedicates every class in memory of his mother, who died in 2001. As of 2025, the daily lectures received between 25,000 and 35,000 viewers, making it the most popular shiur in the world. He spends an estimated 14 hours per day to prepare for his lectures.
