= Simcha Bunim Cohen =

Simcha Bunim Cohen (born 1957) is an Orthodox rabbi and author who has written English-language halachic works that deal with the intricate laws of Shabbat and Jewish holidays.

== Biography ==
Simcha Bunim was born in 1957 to Rivkah and Moshe Cohen.

Rabbi Simcha Bunim Cohen is a senior kollel fellow at Beth Medrash Govoha and lives with his wife and children in Lakewood Township, New Jersey. He serves as the rabbi for Khal Ateres Yeshaya. He is a grandson-in-law of Rabbi Avigdor Miller.

== Works ==
Cohen authors his books for those fluent primarily in English. His works on the laws of Shabbat cover their topics in depth and include extensive footnoting and sourcing in Hebrew on the bottom of each page and are "clear, easy to use and authoritative":

- The Shabbos Kitchen: A comprehensive halachic guide to the preparation of food and other kitchen activities on Shabbos
- The Shabbos Home (vol I and II): A comprehensive halachic guide to the preparation of food and other kitchen activities on Shabbos
- The Sanctity of Shabbos: A comprehensive guide to the laws of Shabbos and Yom Tov as they apply to a non-Jew doing work on behalf of a Jew
- The Radiance of Shabbos: The complete laws of the Shabbos and Festival candle lighting, Kiddush, Lechem Mishneh, meals, Bircas Hamazon, and Havdalah
- The Laws of Yom Tov: A comprehensive halachic guide to the laws and practices of the Festivals
- Muktzeh, A Practical Guide: A comprehensive treatment of the principles and common applications of the laws of muktzeh
- Laws of Daily Living: A comprehensive halachic guide to Morning Routines, Preparations for Prayers, Tallis, Tefillin, The Berachos, Amen, Pesukei Dezimrah
- Laws of the Three Weeks, Tishah B'Av and other Fasts (Part of Laws of Daily Living series)
- Children in Halacha: Laws relating to young children: Chinuch, Shabbos, Kashrus, Learning and much more
- The Laws of Aveilus: A comprehensive and practical guide to the laws of mourning

Because his texts make it easy for those with a limited grasp of Hebrew vocabulary, they appear on numerous "must-read" lists for converts and ba'alei teshuva.
