= Yeshiva Gedolah (disambiguation) =

Yeshiva Gedolah may refer to:

- Lubavitch Yeshiva Gedolah of Johannesburg
- Yeshiva Centre, Melbourne
- Yeshiva Gedola of Passaic
- Yeshiva Gedolah
- Yeshivah Centre, Sydney
- Yeshivah Gedolah Zal, Melbourne, Australia
