= Aharon Kotler =

American rabbi; founder of Beth Medrash Govoha

Rabbi Aharon Kotler
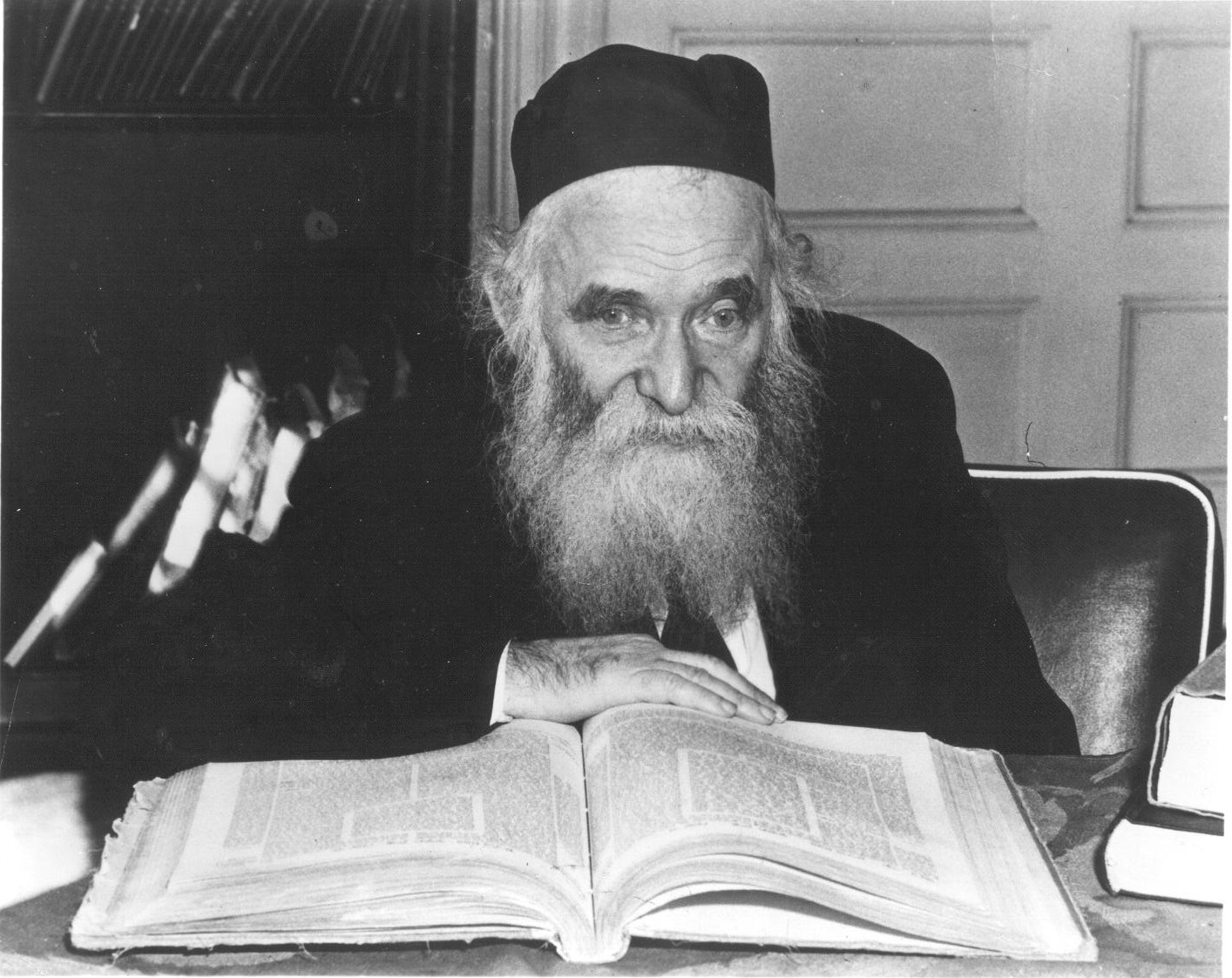

Personal life
- Born: Aharon Kotler; February 2, 1892 (2 Adar 5652) Śvisłač, Russian Empire
- Died: November 29, 1962 (aged 71) (2 Kislev 5723) New York City
- Buried: Har HaMenuchot

Religious life
- Religion: Judaism

Jewish leader
- Successor: Shneur Kotler
- Position: Rosh yeshiva
- Yeshiva: Beth Medrash Govoha, Lakewood Township, New Jersey

Aharon Kotler (February 2, 1892 – November 29, 1962) was a Haredi (ultra-Orthodox) rabbi and a prominent leader of Orthodox Judaism in Lithuania and in the United States, where he founded Beth Medrash Govoha in Lakewood Township, New Jersey.

== Early life ==
Kotler was born Aharon Pines (Note: Pronounced /piːnɪs/ PEE-nis) in Sislevitch, near Minsk, Russian Empire in 1892. He was orphaned at the age of 10 and adopted by his uncle, Yitzchak Pines, a rabbinic judge in Minsk, who sent him to study in the yeshivah in Krinik under the tutelage of Rav Zalman Sender Kahana-Shapiro. He then studied in the Slabodka yeshiva in Lithuania under Nosson Tzvi Finkel, and Moshe Mordechai Epstein, where he became known as an exceptional scholar.

== Career ==
Kotler joined his father-in-law, Isser Zalman Meltzer, in running the yeshiva of Slutsk. After World War I, the yeshiva moved from Slutsk to Kletsk in interwar Poland. With the outbreak of World War II, Kotler and the yeshiva relocated to Vilna, then the major refuge of most yeshivas from the occupied areas. The smaller yeshivas followed the lead of the larger ones, and either escaped with them to Japan and China, or were arrested by the communists and sent to Siberia or Kazakhstan. Kotler turned down transit visas to Curacao via Japan for his students, arranged by Zorach Warhaftig and issued by Chiune Sugihara, calling them mere "toilet paper." Most of his students did not manage to escape and were murdered by the Nazis. He was brought to America on April 10, 1941, by the Vaad Hatzalah rescue organization, and guided it during the Holocaust. At first, he settled in New York City's Upper West Side, and in 1949, he moved to the Borough Park neighborhood of Brooklyn.

In 1943, Kotler founded Beth Medrash Govoha in Lakewood Township, New Jersey, with 15 students. By the time of his death in 1962, the yeshiva had grown to 250 students. He was succeeded by his son, Shneur Kotler, as rosh yeshiva (dean). As of 2011, Beth Medrash Govoha is run by his grandson, Malkiel Kotler, and three of his grandsons-in-law, Yerucham Olshin, Yisroel Neuman, and Dovid Schustal. By 2019 the yeshiva had grown into the largest institution of its kind in the United States with 6,715 students, 2,748 regular and 3,967 in Kollel status. while the surrounding Lakewood community supports a network of more than 100 other yeshivas and approximately 200 synagogues for an Orthodox population estimated at more than 66,000.

Upon the death of his father-in-law, Kotler inherited the latter's position of rosh yeshiva of Etz Chaim Yeshiva of Jerusalem. In an unusual arrangement, he held this position while continuing to live in the United States, and visiting Jerusalem occasionally. Today, his grandson, Zevulun Schwartzman, heads a kollel located at Etz Chaim Yeshiva.

== Activism ==
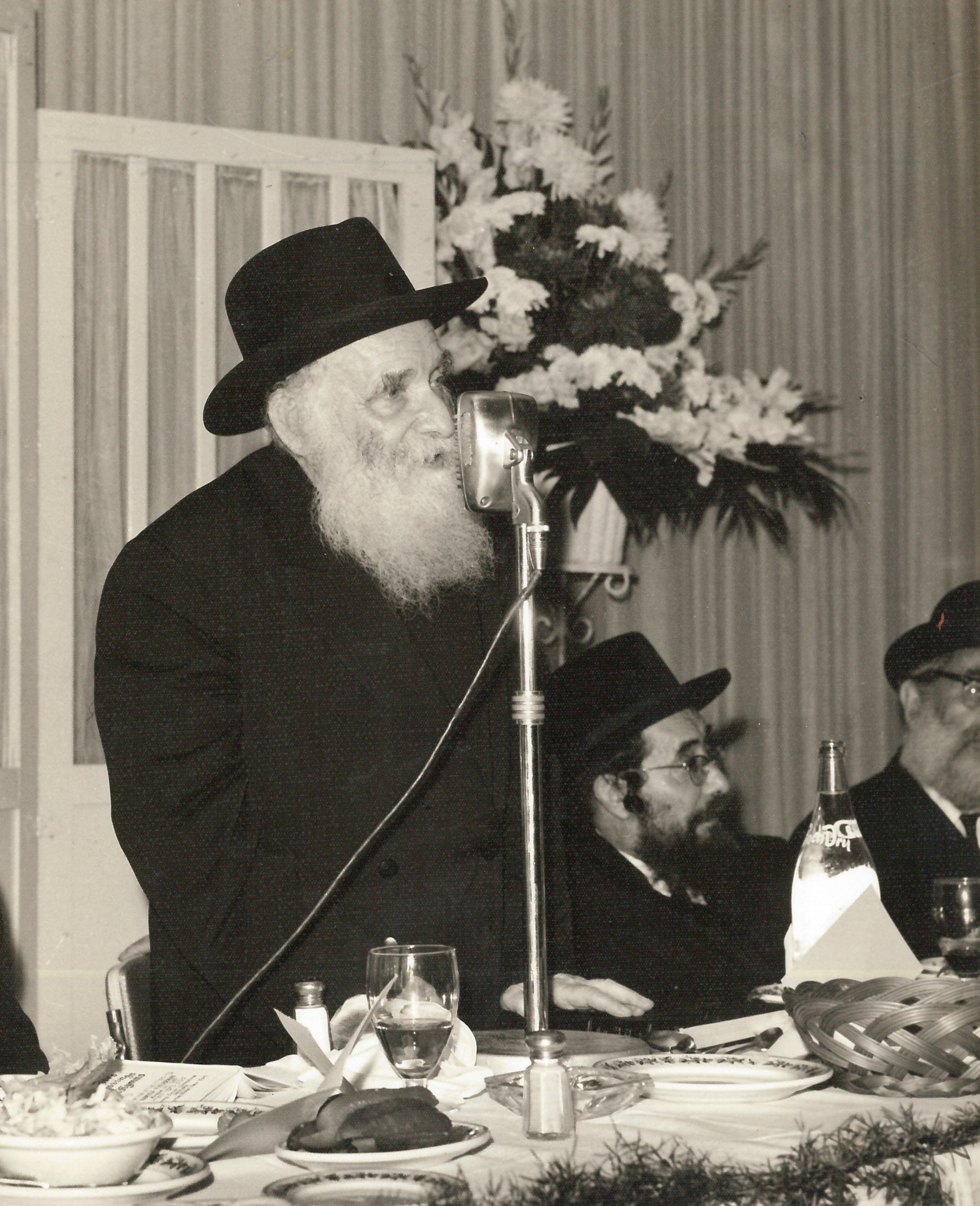
Rab Kotler shortly before his death

Following his arrival in the United States, Kotler joined the presidium of the Vaad Hatzalah, working feverishly to save rabbis and yeshiva students who were trapped in Europe. Along with Eliezer Silver, Avraham Kalmanowitz and others, he worked day and night, using both private and government channels to try and save lives. A committed anti-Zionist, Kotler also helped establish Chinuch Atzmai, the independent religious school system in Israel, and was the chairman of the Moetzes Gedolei HaTorah of Agudath Israel. He chaired the Rabbinical administration board of Torah Umesorah, and was on the presidium of the Agudas HaRabbonim of the U.S. and Canada.

Some of those noted Jewish activists who supported Kotler in his efforts were Irving Bunim, Moses Feuerstein, Stephen Klein and Zev Wolfson.

== Death ==
Kotler died at Columbia-Presbyterian Medical Center in New York City on November 29, 1962. A funeral service at the Congregation Sons of Israel Kalwarier on Manhattan's Lower East Side drew 25,000 mourners, with 200 officers from the New York City Police Department assigned to the event. Kotler was buried in Israel on Har HaMenuchot.

== Works ==
- Shu"t Mishnas R' Aharon, responsa
- Mishnas Rabbi Aharon on various tractates of the Talmud

== Notable students ==
- Yitzchak Abadi (born 1933), posek in Lakewood, New Jersey
- Philip Berg (1927–2013), dean of the Kabbalah Centre
- Shlomo Brevda (1931–2013), maggid and Vilna Gaon scholar
- Shlomo Carlebach (musician)
- José Faur (1934–2020), Sepharadi hakham, teacher and scholar
- Moshe Heinemann, posek in Baltimore
- Leib Heyman, Rav Beis Knesses HaGra, Jerusalem Israel
- Moshe Hillel Hirsch, rosh yeshiva Slabodka Yeshiva in Bnei Brak
- Shmuel Kamenetsky, rosh yeshiva Talmudical Academy of Philadelphia
- Shlomo Korach (1935–2018), chief rabbi of Bnei Brak
- Shlomo Leifer of Nadvorna
- Shlomo Miller, rosh kollel and posek in Toronto
- Yechiel Perr (born 1935), rosh yeshiva Yeshiva of Far Rockaway
- Elyakim Rosenblatt, rosh yeshiva of Yeshiva Kesser Torah
- Gedalia Schorr (born 1910), rosh yeshiva of Torah Vodaas
- Meir Stern, rosh yeshiva Yeshiva Gedola of Passaic
- Elya Svei (1924–2009), rosh yeshiva Talmudical Academy of Philadelphia
- Yisroel Taplin, International Date Line scholar
