= Matisyahu Salomon =

English-born American rabbi (1937–2024)

Rabbi Matisyahu Salomon הרב מתתיהו חיים סולומן
- Salomon in 2018
- Title: Lakewood Mashgiach

Personal life
- Born: Matisyahu Chaim Salomon; November 28, 1937 London, England
- Died: January 2, 2024 (aged 86) Lakewood, New Jersey, U.S.
- Buried: Har HaMenuchot
- Spouse: Miriam Salomon (née Falk) (m. 1960; died 2016)
- Children: 10
- Education: Yeshivas Etz Chaim (London)

Religious life
- Religion: Judaism
- Denomination: Orthodox

Jewish leader
- Predecessor: Moshe Schwab; Nosson Meir Wachtfogel
- Position: Mashgiach ruchani
- Yeshiva: Yeshivas Beis Yosef (Gateshead); Beth Medrash Govoha
- Began: 1979
- Ended: 2024
- Yahrtzeit: 22 Tevet

Matisyahu Chaim Salomon (November 28, 1937 – January 2, 2024) was an English-born American rabbi, author and public speaker. He served as the mashgiach ruchani (spiritual supervisor) of Beth Medrash Govoha, one of the world's largest yeshivas, located in Lakewood, New Jersey, United States. An opponent of unrestrained internet access in the Orthodox Jewish community, he spearheaded a campaign to have internet filters installed on all computers and smartphones.

== Early life and education ==
Matisyahu Chaim Salomon was born in London, England to Yaakov and Ettel. After receiving his primary education in London, he moved with his family to Gateshead in the early 1940s, where he studied in a yeshiva and kollel. His study partner for 16 years was Chaim Kaufman, who went on to found the Gateshead Yeshiva L'Zeirim. Salomon studied under Elyah Lopian, the former rosh yeshiva of Etz Chaim Yeshiva for less than a year. He considered Lopian to be his main rebbe (mentor). Lopian, who had studied under Simcha Zissel Ziv, sparked in Salomon a life-long interest in following the Kelm Talmud Torah mussar school of philosophy.

== Career ==
Salomon started out as assistant mashgiach ruchani (spiritual supervisor) in the Gateshead Yeshiva, working under Moshe Schwab. He later took over as the senior mashgiach at Gateshead, a position Salomon would hold for almost 30 years. In the fall of 1997, he was invited by Nosson Meir Wachtfogel to come to the United States in order to assume the position of mashgiach ruchani of Beth Medrash Govoha, one of the world's largest yeshivas located in Lakewood, New Jersey. Salomon was succeeded at Gateshead by Mordechai Yosef Karnowsky. Around this time, Salomon began to take a leadership position in the Vaad L'Hatzolas Nidchei Yisroel, an advocacy organization seeing to the spiritual needs of Jews in Russia, Georgia and Azerbaijan.

Salomon was a lecturer on topics relating to Jewish religious growth and communal issues in the yeshiva world. On May 3, 2009, Salomon comforted the mourners of a 9-year-old boy who was struck and killed by an errant baseball, reminding them that the boy had already achieved the afterlife, and we "are not here for this world". One week later, Salomon gave the keynote address at the 46th annual Agudath Israel of America National Siyum Mishnayos, which honored students' achievements in the study of Mishnah. On September 15, 2009, he was one of the main speakers at a hachnosath Sefer Torah (inauguration of a Torah scroll) ceremony in Lakewood which was attended by over 6,000 people.

While Salomon preferred that cases pertaining to sexual abuse in the Orthodox community be handled by a beth din (rabbinical court) rather than the secular justice system—in order to "protect human dignity" and because "we are guided by the Torah"—he closed down the beth din in 2009 due to pressure from child advocates, victims' relatives and mental health professionals. Salomon was not opposed to whistleblowing blogs focused on the Orthodox community, so long as the bloggers avoided the use of profanity and sarcasm. But he was opposed to unfettered internet access, due to the perceived risk of harm to the mores of the Orthodox Jewish community. Instead, he advocated for the installation of internet filters on all computers and smartphones. In May 2012 he organized, together with the Skulener Rebbe, a mass gathering of over 60,000 people at both Citi Field and the adjacent Arthur Ashe Stadium in Queens, New York in order to bring attention to the dangers of using the internet. For similar reasons, Salomon discouraged the adoption of kosher versions of forbidden foods such as cheeseburgers, pork and shellfish. In 2015 he signed a letter, along with Shmuel Kamenetsky and Malkiel Kotler, imploring school principals to admit unvaccinated children into the classroom.

== Personal life and death ==
Salomon was married to Miriam, a descendant of Jacob Joshua Falk, from 1960 until her death in 2016. They had ten children. He died in Lakewood on January 2, 2024, at age 86, and was buried in Jerusalem's Har HaMenuchot cemetery.

== Works ==
A number of books have been published in Hebrew based on Salomon's public shmuesin (mussar discourses) and shiurim (lectures) under the title Matnas Chaim:

- Salomon, Matisyahu (1994). מתנת חיים - קונטרס לחג השבועות [Chaim's Offering – Shavuot Edition] (in Hebrew) (1st ed.). מוציא לאור לא ידוע.
- Salomon, Matisyahu (2001). מתנת חיים [Chaim's Offering] (in Hebrew) (1st ed.). Z. Gotlib. p. 46.
- Salomon, Matisyahu; Reinman, Yosef (2002). With Hearts Full of Faith (1st ed.). ArtScroll. p. 274. ISBN 9781578195831.
- Salomon, Matisyahu; Gottlieb, Zeev; Naiman, Yisrael Yaakov (2005). מתנת חיים [Chaim's Offering] (in Hebrew). Vol. 2 (1st ed.).
- Salomon, Matisyahu; Reinman, Yosef (2009). With Hearts Full of Love (1st ed.). ArtScroll. p. 319. ISBN 9781422608913.
- Salomon, Matisyahu (2019). קונטרס מתנת חיים - מאמרים יסודיים בימים הנוראים [Chaim's Offering – Basic Essays On the High Holy Days] (in Hebrew) (1st ed.). Mekhon Be'er HaTorah. p. 274.
- Salomon, Matisyahu (2019). קונטרס מתנת חיים - מאמרים יסודיים בעניני יו"ט פורים: מסודר ומיוסד על פיוט שושנת יעקב [Chaim's Offering – Basic Essays On the Purim Holiday: Arranged and Based On the Poem Shoshanat Yaakov] (in Hebrew) (1st ed.). Moshe Yehuda Halpern. p. 110.

The Jewish Observer published an interview with Salomon on the Jewish approach to marriage.
