= Yisroel Taplin =

Rabbi Yisroel Taplin is an American Talmud scholar and author of a work of Jewish Law (Halacha) concerning the International Date Line.

Taplin studied in Beth Medrash Govoha in Lakewood Township, New Jersey, where he continues to study and reside. He initially began his studies there under the tutelage of its founder, Rabbi Aharon Kotler. He holds the position of Official Examiner ("bochen") for Beth Medrash Govoha.

Taplin's magnum opus was first published in Hebrew under the title Taarich Yisroel (תאריך ישראל); it was subsequently condensed and adopted into English (The Date Line in Halacha) by Zalman Tropper in 1999 and "thoroughly reviewed" by Taplin himself, with another edition being republished through Feldheim Publications in 2003. His work explores the various opinions on the location of the international date line as recognized by Jewish Law and the various outcomes of the differences between the varying opinions spanning many facets of Jewish Law.
