= Malkiel Kotler =

American Haredi rabbi

Rabbi Malkiel Kotler
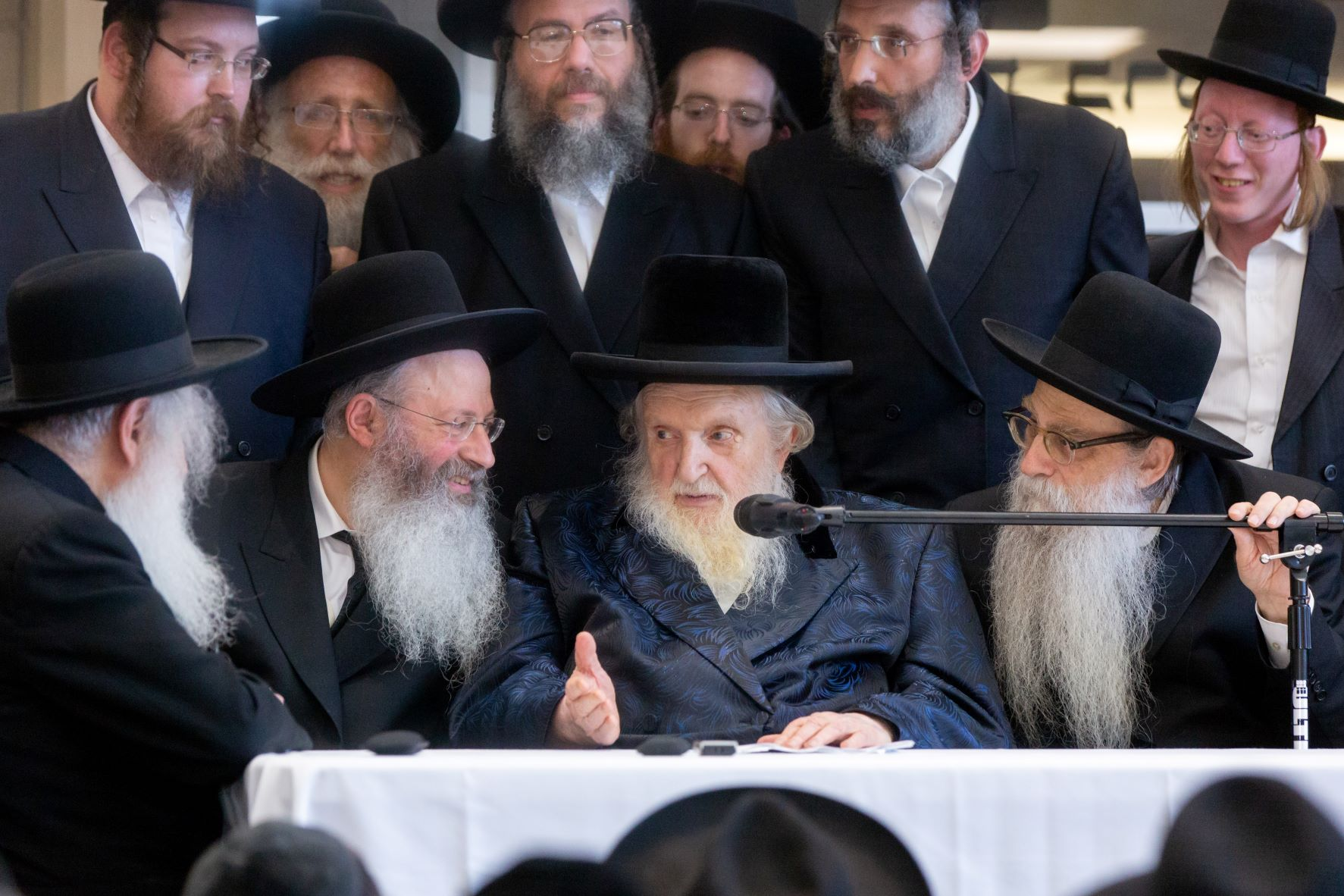
- Kotler (left), seated beside Rabbi Moshe Sternbuch (center)

Personal life
- Born: Aryeh Malkiel Kotler; April 1951 (age 75)
- Parent(s): Shneur Kotler; Rischel Friedman

Religious life
- Religion: Judaism
- Denomination: Haredi

Jewish leader
- Predecessor: Shneur Kotler
- Yeshiva: Beth Medrash Govoha
- Position: Rosh yeshiva
- Began: 1982
- Residence: Lakewood, New Jersey

Aryeh Malkiel Kotler (born April 1951) is a Haredi (ultra-Orthodox) rabbi and rosh yeshiva (dean) of Beth Medrash Govoha in Lakewood, New Jersey, one of the largest yeshivas in the world. He is a member of the Moetzes Gedolei HaTorah (Council of Torah Sages) of Agudath Israel of America.

== Biography ==
Aryeh Malkiel Kotler was born to Shneur Kotler and his wife, Rischel (née Friedman). He is the second of 9 children. The elder Kotler was the rosh yeshiva (dean) of Beth Medrash Govoha in Lakewood, New Jersey and son of the yeshiva's founder, Aharon Kotler. On his father's side, Kotler is the great-grandson of Isser Zalman Meltzer.

Upon the death of his father in 1982, Kotler was named co-rosh yeshiva of Beth Medrash Govoha along with Dovid Schustal, Yeruchem Olshin, and Yisroel Neuman, who are all married to grandchildren of Aharon Kotler. At that time, the yeshiva had an enrollment of approximately 800 students, which has since grown to approximately 6,300.

Kotler is a member of the Moetzes Gedolei HaTorah (Council of Torah Sages) of Agudath Israel of America.

== Family ==
Kotler's first wife Hinda was the daughter of Yechiel Michel Feinstein and Lifsha, the daughter of Yitzchok Zev Soloveitchik. When Kotler succeeded his father, who died while Kotler was in the US visiting him, as rosh yeshiva of Beth Medrash Govoha, Hinda Kotler refused to join her husband in Lakewood or accept a get (Jewish divorce document) without a rabbinical court in Israel hearing the case; she refused to submit to an American rabbinical court. Kotler was issued a rarely used exemption known as a heter meah rabbanim (permission of 100 rabbis) which allowed him to take a second wife upon depositing the divorce document for the first wife with the rabbinical court. This created a rift within the non-hassidic Hareidi world, with some claiming that the heter meah rabbanim was invalid. Several months later he married his second wife, Chana Leah Tikotzky.
