= Meir Stern =

Dean of Yeshiva Gedola of Passaic

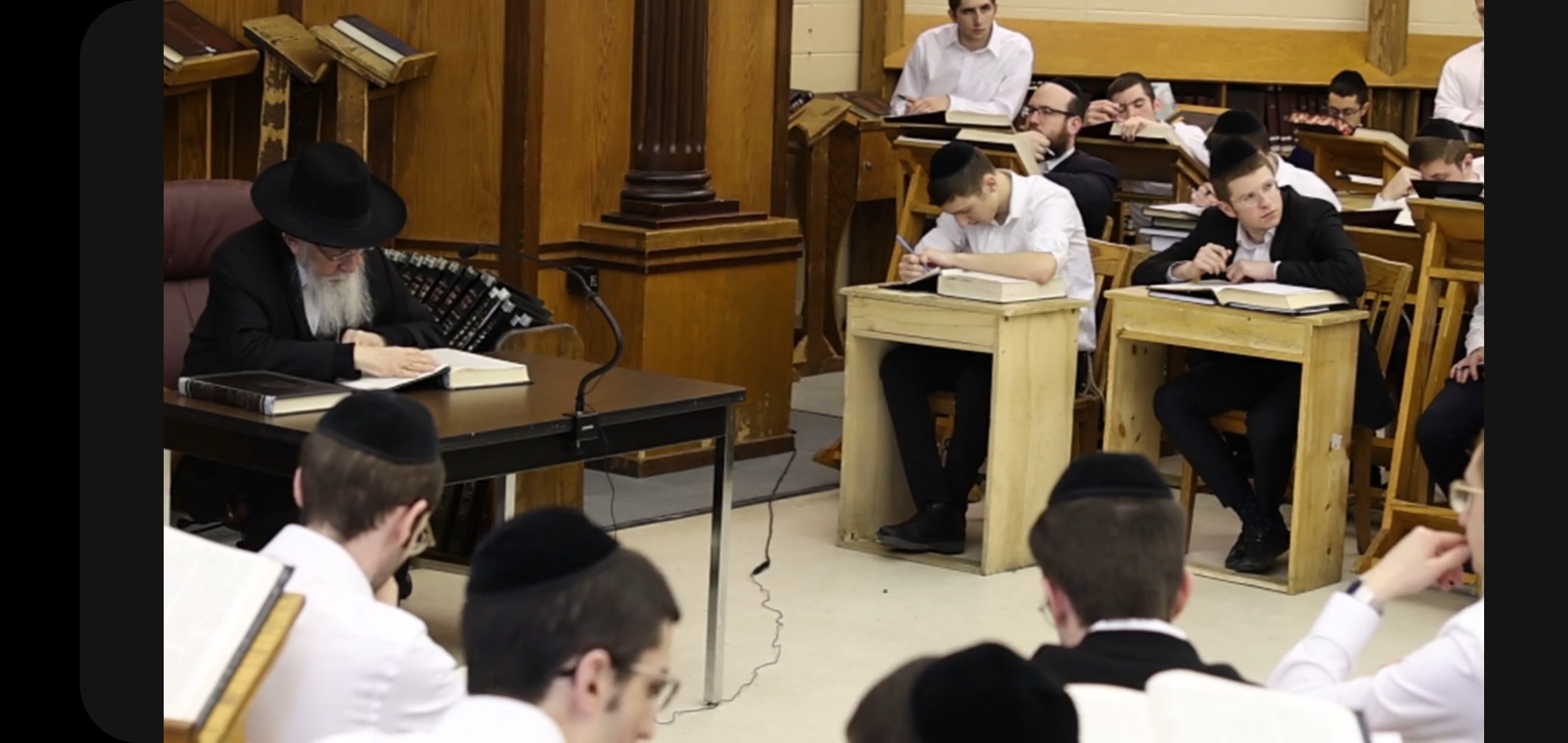

Rabbi Meir Stern is the rosh yeshiva (dean) of the Yeshiva Gedola of Passaic, a large yeshiva and kollel in the United States. He is known for the revival of the Orthodox communities of Passaic and Clifton. Because he is the sole lecturer at Yeshiva Gedola, with enrollment of approximately 200 students, it is estimated that he gives the largest regular Talmud class in the United States. In addition to his Talmudic acumen and lecture he is also known for his incredible integrity.

He grew up in Boro Park, Brooklyn. As a young man, he studied in Beth Medrash Govoha, Lakewood, NJ, in the mid-1950s. Those were the early years of the institution, when it was a small yeshiva under the guidance of Rabbi Aharon Kotler. He later learned in Brisk Yeshiva in Israel under the guidance of Rabbi Berel Soloveitchik, where he developed his primary approach to Torah study and teaching.
