= Lake Carasaljo =

Man-made lake in New Jersey, United States

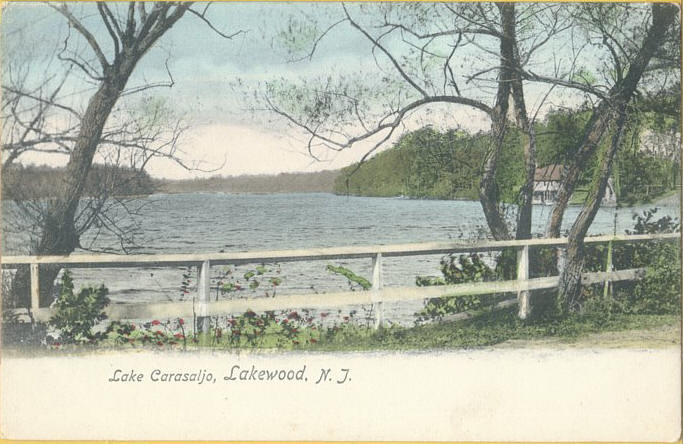
- Early postcard view

- Location within New Jersey Location within the United States
- Location: Lakewood Township, New Jersey
- Coordinates: 40.091189°N 74.223944°W
- Type: Reservoir
- Basin countries: United States

A man-made lake in the center of Lakewood Township, New Jersey, Lake Carasaljo was created in the mid-1700s when the South Branch of the Metedeconk River was dammed to provide power for a sawmill, which became known as Three Partners Mill. The lake was given its present name in 1865, when the town was renamed from Bergen Iron Works to Bricksburg.

Lake Carasaljo is named after the three daughters of the owner of the Bergen Iron Works, Joseph Woolston Brick, for whom Brick Township, New Jersey is named. His daughters were named Caroline (nicknamed 'Carrie'), Sarah ('Sally') and Josephine ('Jo'). Brick's wife Manetta lent her name to its sister lake, which was created when the Watering Place Branch was dammed in 1816.

Local legend is that the three girls drowned in the lake, which was subsequently named after them. Historical documents show the three girls were alive when the lake was named.

Another man-made lake, Lake Shenandoah, is also found along the same branch of the Metedeconk River and is part of the Ocean County, New Jersey Department of Parks and Recreation.

Georgian Court University, which is on the grounds of what was once an estate of George Jay Gould, is on the northern shore of the lake. The lake is bounded on the north side by North Lake Drive, on the south by South Lake Drive, and on the east by U.S. Route 9 (also known as River Road). It is separated from Lake Manetta by the Central Avenue Bridge.
