= Yeshiva Gedola of Passaic =

Location
- 55 Ascension St. Passaic, New Jersey; Passaic, New Jersey 07055; USA; 40.8480°N 74.1285°W

Information
- Established: 1973
- Rosh Yeshiva: Rabbi Meir Stern
- Mashgiach: Rabbi Nosson Weissman
- Affiliation: Orthodox
- Bachurim: 160–180

Yeshiva Gedola of Passaic is an advanced yeshiva in the Passaic Park neighborhood of Passaic, New Jersey catering to post-high-school-age men. Founded in 1973 by Rabbis Chaim Davis and Gershon Weisenfeld, and further developed by Rabbi Meir Stern who replaced Rabbi Wiesenfeld when the latter became ill before the yeshiva's opening, it developed into one of the leading yeshiva gedolas (advanced Talmudic institutions) in the United States and revitalized the small Orthodox community of Passaic.

== History ==
In 1973 Rabbi Shneur Kotler, rosh yeshiva of Beth Medrash Govoha, Rabbi Nosson Meir Wachtfogel, mashgiach ruchani of Beth Medrash Govoha, and Rabbi Dov Lesser supported the idea of opening a community kollel in Passaic. These Gedolim chose Rabbi Chaim Davis, founder of the Toronto Community Kollel, and Rabbi Wiesenfeld, then a rosh mesivta (head) of Beth Hatalmud Rabbinical College, to head the new institution. In mid-1973, however, Rabbi Wiesenfeld became seriously ill and was replaced by Rabbi Meir Stern. Rabbi Wiesenfeld died at age 49 on 24 September 1981.

The Yeshiva Gedola of Passaic opened with 10 unmarried students in the yeshiva section and 10 married students in the kollel section. By the mid-1980s enrollment had reached nearly 100 students.

In 1989 the yeshiva relocated to its own campus, including a beth midrash (study hall), dining room and dormitories.

The growing yeshiva, together with the installation of an eruv and a mikveh, turned Passaic into a more desirable location for Orthodox Jewish families. Passaic's close proximity to New York also appealed to breadwinners who commuted to New York daily. Beginning in the mid-1980s, more and more Orthodox families began moving to Passaic. As of 2006, the Jewish community had mushroomed to 1300 families in a two-square-mile area, with a net gain of 80 families per year, making it the second fastest-growing Jewish community behind Lakewood, New Jersey.

== Faculty and staff ==
- Rabbi Meir Stern, rosh yeshiva
- Rabbi Nosson Weissman, mashgiach ruchani
- Rabbi Osher Dovid May, rosh kollel
- Rabbi Eliezer Breslauer, rosh kollel

== Noted alumni ==
- Rabbi Yissochor Fishman, administrator of the Hebrew Academy of Cleveland's yeshiva high school
- Rabbi Chaim Bin-Nun
- Rabbi Daniel Mechanic, founder and director of Project Chazon
- Rabbi Moshe Taub, former rabbi of Young Israel of Greater Buffalo, New York and currently a Rabbi in Queens New York, Rav Hamachshir of the Buffalo Vaad Hakashrut
- Rabbi Heshie Hirth, Founder and administrator of Yeshiva Ktana of Passaic and Mikvah Yisroel of Passaic.
- Rabbi Yoel Gold, Orthodox rabbi, filmmaker, and inspirational speaker.
- Rabbi Eli Stefansky, Daf Yomi educator and founder of Mercaz Daf HaYomi.
- Rabbi Yehoshua Rubanowitz, Rosh Yeshiva, educator, and community leader.
