= Dovid Schustal =

American-Austrian Orthodox Jewish rabbi

Rabbi Dovid Schustal

Personal life
- Born: Dovid Tzvi Schustal; July 1947 (age 79) Monsey, New York, U.S.

Religious life
- Religion: Judaism
- Denomination: Haredi

Jewish leader
- Predecessor: Shneur Kotler
- Position: Rosh yeshiva
- Yeshiva: Beth Medrash Govoha
- Began: 1982
- Residence: Lakewood, New Jersey, U.S.

Dovid Tzvi Schustal (Hebrew: דוד צבי שוסטאל; born July 1947) is an Orthodox rabbi and one of the four roshei yeshiva (deans) of Beth Medrash Govoha (the Lakewood Yeshiva) in Lakewood, New Jersey. He shares this post with rabbis Malkiel Kotler, Yerucham Olshin, and Yisroel Neuman.

== Biography ==
Schustal is the eldest child of Rabbi Simcha Schustal and his wife, Sarah, the daughter of Rabbi Shmuel Ehrenfeld. He was born a year after his parents' marriage and their move to Monsey, New York, where Simcha Schustal was rosh kollel of the kollel attached to Beth Medrash Elyon for nearly 30 years.

Schustal married the daughter of the previous rosh yeshiva of Beth Medrash Govoha, Shneur Kotler.
