= Nosson Meir Wachtfogel =

Orthodox rabbi (1910–1998)

Rabbi Nosson Meir Wachtfogel
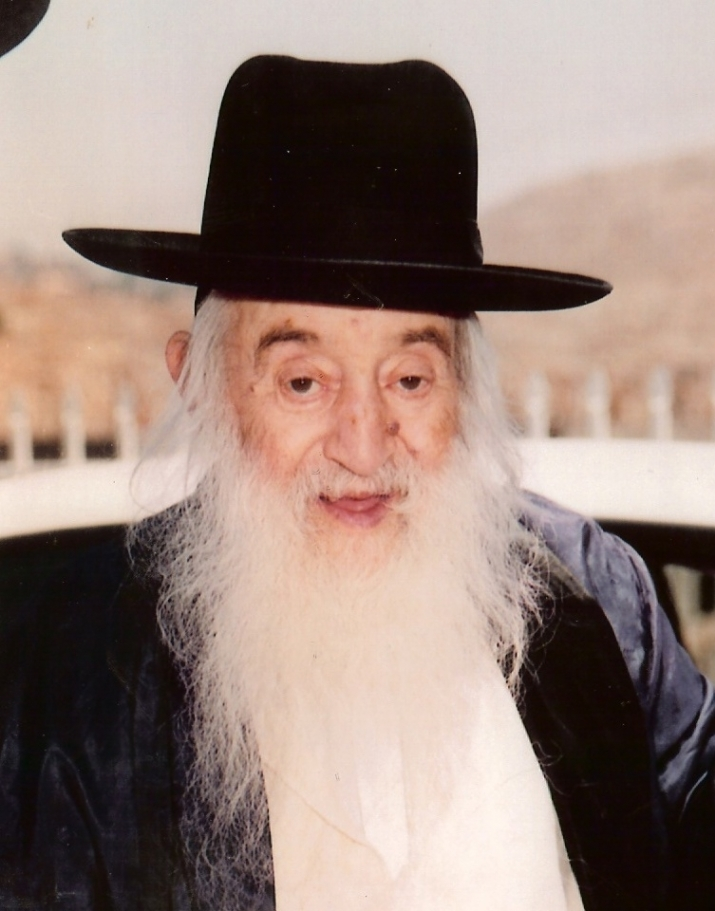
- Nosson Meir Wachtfogel.
- Title: Lakewood Mashgiach

Personal life
- Born: Nosson Meir Wachtfogel; 18 February 1910 Kuliai, Kovno Governorate, Russian Empire
- Died: 21 November 1998 (aged 88) Lakewood, New Jersey, USA
- Buried: Har HaMenuchot
- Spouse: Chava Shlomowitz
- Children: Rabbi Elya Ber Wachtfogel, Miriam Rubnitz, Sheina Leah Bursztyn, Mashie.
- Parent: Moshe Yom Tov Wachtfogel
- Education: Kelm Talmud Torah, Kelme Lithuania; Yeshivas Rabbeinu Yitzchak Elchanan; Mir yeshiva, Belarus

Religious life
- Religion: Judaism

Jewish leader
- Successor: Rabbi Matisyohu Salomon
- Position: Mashgiach ruchani
- Yeshiva: Beth Medrash Govoha
- Began: 1941
- Ended: 1998
- Semikhah: Boruch Ber Leibowitz, Shimon Shkop, Eliezer Yehuda Finkel

Nosson Meir Wachtfogel (Hebrew: נתן מאיר וכטפוגל) (18 February 1910 in Kuliai, Lithuania – 21 November 1998 in Lakewood, New Jersey, USA), known as the Lakewood Mashgiach, was an Orthodox rabbi and long-time mashgiach ruchani (spiritual supervisor) of Beth Medrash Govoha (the Lakewood Yeshiva) in Lakewood, New Jersey. He also helped establish branches of the Lakewood Yeshiva in dozens of cities, and opened a combination Torah study and Orthodox outreach centers in the United States and other countries.

== Early life ==
Nosson Meir Wachtfogel was born on 9 Adar I, 1910, in the small Lithuanian town of Kuliai, where his father, Moshe Yom Tov Wachtfogel, was a rabbi.

He studied in the Kelm Talmud Torah as a child. In the early 1920s, his father accepted a rabbinical post in Montreal, Quebec, Canada and moved there with his mother, while Nosson Meir remained in Kuhl to complete his mesivta (Jewish secondary school) program. At age 15 he joined his parents in Canada and then went to Yeshiva University's Yeshivas Rabbeinu Yitzchak Elchanan in New York. Among his study partners was Avigdor Miller.

A few years later, when the yeshiva added secular studies to its curriculum, Wachtfogel staged a protest, urging his friends to quit the yeshiva and go to study in European yeshivas. At age 17, he himself enrolled at the Mir yeshiva in the town of Mir, Belarus, where he remained for seven years. He was influenced there by rabbis Yeruchom Levovitz, Yechezkel Levenstein, and Boruch Ber Leibowitz.

When Wachtfogel's mentor, Levovitz, died in the summer of 1936, he decided to return to Canada. At that point he received semicha (rabbinic ordination) from Leibowitz, Shimon Shkop, the rosh yeshiva of the Grodno yeshiva, and Eliezer Yehuda Finkel, rosh yeshiva of the Mir.

When Wachtfogel arrived in New York Elchonon Wasserman, rosh yeshiva of the Baranowitz Yeshiva, was also there, and they spoke of Wachtfogel's concerns about living in materialistic America. Wasserman advised him to return immediately to Europe and study in the Kelm Talmud Torah. He stayed in Kelm for over three years, remaining there after World War II broke out, when he could have left with his Canadian passport. Near the end of this period he became engaged to Chava Shlomowitz, daughter of Rabbi Yisrael Zalman Shlomowitz of Geniendz and a graduate of Sarah Schenirer's teacher's seminary in Kraków.

In June 1940 the Russians entered Kelm as part of the Russian occupation of the Baltic states and proceeded to confiscate businesses, enforce rationing, and put their sympathizers in control. British citizens in Kelm were advised by the British Consulate in Kaunas to travel to Kaunas and from there to be evacuated to Australia. Wachtfogel and Chava joined a group of British citizens stranded in Kelm including the wife and daughter of Rabbi Eliyahu Eliezer Dessler and a group from the Telshe Yeshiva on their flight to Australia. In order to procure a visa for Chava, Wachtfogel had to prove that they were married. They did this by conducting the first half of their Jewish marriage ceremony, erusin, in Kovno; their chuppah took place after they reached Montreal.

The group departed on a Shabbat, 26 October 1940, taking a train to Moscow via Riga. The next day they boarded the Trans-Siberian Express to Vladivostok, a journey of nine days, during which they had no kosher food but fruit and tea. From Vladivostok they traveled by steamship to Brisbane, a voyage of nearly four and a half weeks (here their rations were limited to sardines, eggs, and tomatoes). While the British citizens in the group spent over six years in Australia waiting to be repatriated, Wachtfogel, Schechter and Wachtfogel's bride were given first-class tickets to New York by the Board of Governors of the Australian Jewish community, which feared that they would foment a religious revival in their community.

== Mashgiach ==
In spring 1942 Wachtfogel and 19 other avreichim (young married men) started the first kollel in America, called Beth Medrash Govoha, in White Plains, New York. They offered the leadership to Rabbi Aharon Kotler, who asked that they move the kollel to Lakewood, New Jersey, and admit bachurim (unmarried young men) in order to turn it into a full-scale, European-style yeshiva. The avreichim agreed and became Kotler's first students when he founded Beth Medrash Govoha. In 1943 Kotler asked Wachtfogel to become the yeshiva's mashgiach ruchani, a position he held for more than 50 years until his death.

He helped to establish kollels in 30 cities, including Montreal, Boston, Long Beach, New York, Scranton, Pennsylvania, Miami Beach, Denver, Pittsburgh, Deal, New Jersey, and Melbourne. He was involved in founding Talmudical Yeshiva of Philadelphia in 1953.

== Community kollel pioneer ==
In the 1960s and onwards, Wachtfogel oversaw the opening of community kollels (part-time learning programs) in cities including Passaic, New Jersey (which developed into the Yeshiva Gedola of Passaic), Chicago, Pittsburgh, Detroit, Los Angeles, Toronto, and Melbourne, Australia.

In his final years he founded and directed a new organization called Kollel International to fund-raise and establish kollels in small communities. Two such kollels were founded near Lakewood, in Manalapan Township and Howell Township, New Jersey, before his death. Less than a week before his death, he was involved in establishing another kollel on Long Island.

== Final years ==
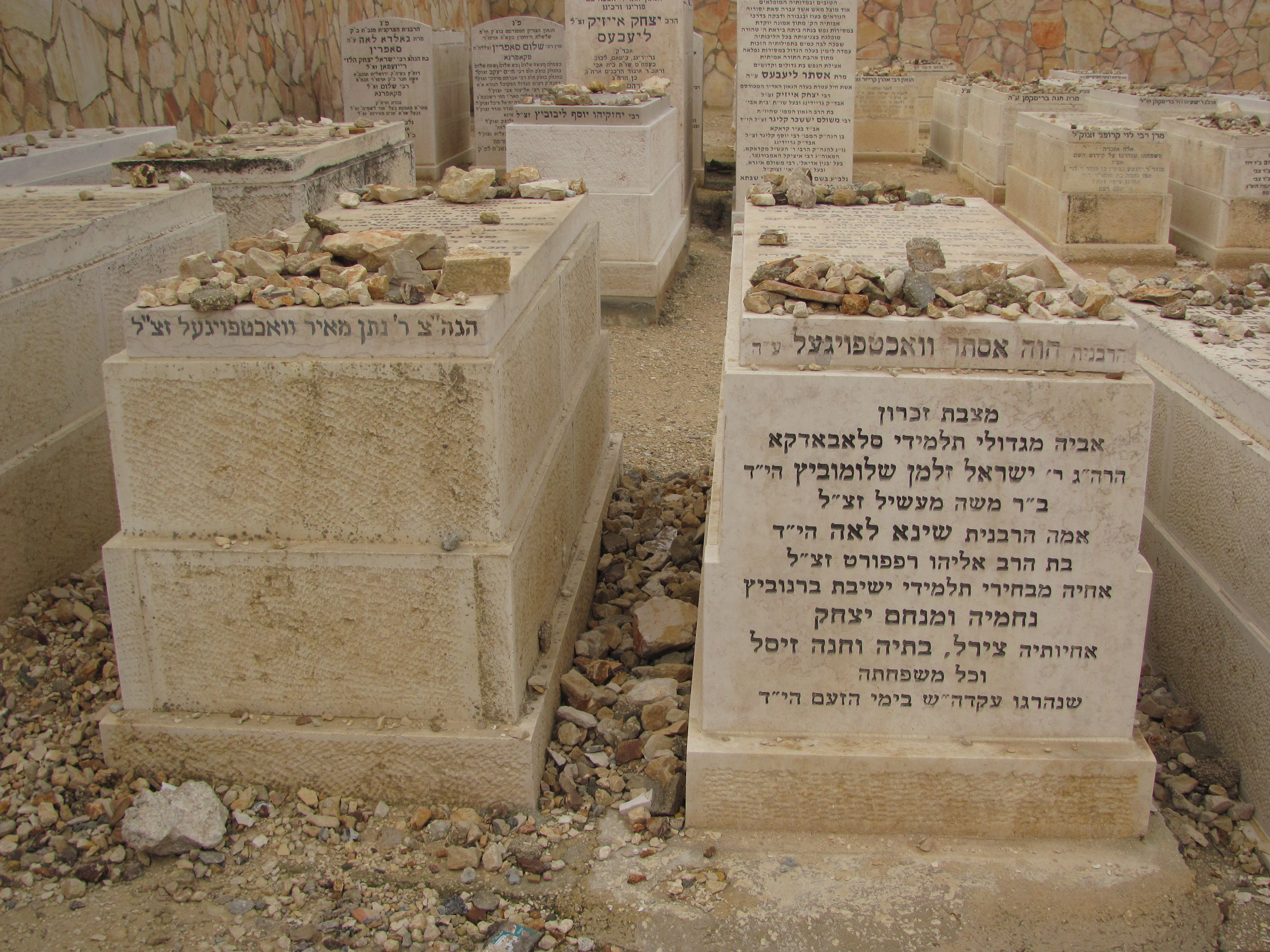
The graves of Wachtfogel (left) and his wife, Chava, in the Har HaMenuchot cemetery of Jerusalem. The names of her parents and siblings killed in the Holocaust are engraved on the side of her tombstone.

In 1997 Wachtfogel and Rabbi Shlomo Wolbe led a delegation of senior rabbis, roshei yeshiva and mashgichim to try to save a Jewish cemetery from destruction in the city of Kaliningrad. The mayor said that this prompted him to sign the permit for its protection.

Wachtfogel died on 21 November 1998. He was buried in the Chelkas HaRabbonim (rabbinical section) of the Har HaMenuchot cemetery in Jerusalem.

His son, Rabbi Elya Ber Wachtfogel, is rosh yeshiva of the Yeshiva of South Fallsburg, New York. After his father's death, he became the leader of Kollel International together with Rabbi Malkiel Kotler.

== Bibliography ==
- Kovetz Sichos Vol. 1-8
- Leket Reshimos B'inyanei Beis Hamikdash
- Leket Reshimos B'inyanei Chanukah
- Leket Reshimos B'inyanei Elul v'Yamim Nora'im
- Leket Reshimos B'inyanei Tefillah
- Noam Hamusar

== Sources ==
- Dershowitz, Rabbi Yitzchok (2006). The Legacy Of Maran Rav Aharon Kotler. Feldheim Publishers. ISBN 1-58330-875-X.
- Rosenblum, Yonoson (2000). Rav Dessler: The life and impact of Rabbi Eliyahu Eliezer Dessler, the Michtav M'Eliyahu. Mesorah Publications, Ltd. ISBN 1-57819-506-3.
- Silber, Dovid (2003). Noble Lives, Noble Deeds II: Captivating stories and biographical profiles of spiritual giants. Mesorah Publications. ISBN 1-57819-794-5.
- Arem, Heshy (2002), "Mashgiach from a Previous Generation: Rabbi Nosson Meir Wachtfogel", in Wolpin, Rabbi Nisson (ed.), Torah Leaders: A treasury of biographical sketches, Mesorah Publications, ISBN 1-57819-773-2
