= Shneur Kotler =

American rabbi; dean of Beth Medrash Govoha

Rabbi Shneur Kotler
- Kotler as a young man in the 1940s, while studying at the Hevron yeshiva in Jerusalem

Personal life
- Born: Yosef Chaim Shneur Kotler; 10 July 1918 Slutsk, Russia
- Died: 24 June 1982 (aged 63) Boston, Massachusetts, U.S.
- Buried: Har HaMenuchos, Jerusalem
- Spouse: Rischel Friedman
- Children: 9, including Malkiel
- Parent: Aharon Kotler (father)
- Education: Hebron Yeshiva

Religious life
- Religion: Judaism
- Denomination: Orthodox

Jewish leader
- Predecessor: Aharon Kotler
- Successor: Malkiel Kotler; Yerucham Olshin; Dovid Schustal; Yisroel Neuman
- Yeshiva: Beth Medrash Govoha
- Position: Rosh yeshiva
- Began: 1962
- Ended: 1982

Yosef Chaim Shneur Kotler (10 July 1918 – 24 June 1982) was an Ashkenazi Orthodox rabbi from the Lithuanian movement and rosh yeshiva of Beth Medrash Govoha (also known as the Lakewood Yeshiva) in Lakewood, New Jersey, from 1962 to 1982. During his tenure, he developed the Lithuanian-style, Haredi but non-Hasidic yeshiva into the largest post-graduate Torah institution in the world. He also established Lakewood-style kollels in 30 cities, and pioneered the establishment of community kollels in which Torah scholars study during the morning and afternoon hours and engage in community outreach during the evenings. Upon his death, he had served as the Lakewood rosh yeshiva for exactly the same amount of time as had his father, Rabbi Aharon Kotler, the founding rosh yeshiva of Beth Medrash Govoha: nineteen years, seven months, and one day.

== Early life ==
Yosef Chaim Shneur Kotler was born on 10 July 1918 in Slutsk, Russia, to Rabbi Aharon Kotler and his wife, Chana Perel, the daughter of Rabbi Isser Zalman Meltzer. Of his parents' children, only he and his sister, Sarah, survived infancy. He was named after his father's father, Shneur Zalman Pines.

Kotler was educated in his youth by his father. He later studied in the Yeshivas Knesses Beis Yitzchak-Kaminetz in Poland and became a student of Rabbi Boruch Ber Leibowitz.

In 1940, when most yeshivas in Lithuania fled to Vilna, including the yeshiva in Kletzk (where Aharon Kotler had moved the Slutsk yeshiva), Kotler went to Vilna where he became engaged to Rischel Friedman. He escaped Europe and went to Mandatory Palestine in 1940 while his fiancée was a refugee in Shanghai. They married in America after the war. His father escaped to Japan and from there to America in 1941. During the war he studied in the Eitz Chaim Yeshiva led by his grandfather, Rabbi Isser Zalman Meltzer, who had also emigrated to Palestine, and attended shiurim given by Rabbi Yechezkel Sarna, rosh yeshiva of the Hevron yeshiva in Jerusalem, and Rabbi Yitzchok Zev Soloveitchik, known as the Brisker Rav.

In 1946 Kotler rejoined his father in America, where he enrolled in the kollel division of the Lakewood Yeshiva which his father had founded. His father sent him to attend the lectures of Joseph B. Soloveichik at RIETS for several months.

== Rosh Yeshiva ==
After his father died in 1962, Kotler took over his father's yeshiva. Whereas his father had actively restricted enrollment to a select group of students, Kotler accepted a broader range of students and post-graduate fellows. Enrollment grew from less than 200 students in 1962 to over 1,000 by the time of his death in 1982.

Kotler supervised the opening of 30 Lakewood-style kollels in 30 cities, including Los Angeles, Detroit, Toronto, Montreal, Boston, Long Beach, New York, Scranton, Pennsylvania, Miami Beach, Denver, Pittsburgh, Deal, New Jersey, and Melbourne.

He also established community kollels in several countries. Unlike a kollel, which is a full-time learning program, a community kollel is a part-time learning program, part-time outreach program. His assistant in this was Rabbi Nosson Meir Wachtfogel (1910–1998), the Lakewood mashgiach. Kotler and Wachtfogel oversaw the opening of community kollels in cities including Passaic, New Jersey (a kollel which developed into the Yeshiva Gedola of Passaic), Chicago, Pittsburgh, Detroit, Los Angeles, Toronto, and Melbourne, Australia.

Kotler served on the Moetzes Gedolei HaTorah of Agudath Israel of America and the rabbinical boards of the Torah Umesorah National Society for Hebrew Day Schools and Chinuch Atzmai. He was also active in the effort to help Jewish refugees from Russia and Iran.

== Death ==
Kotler died on 24 June 1982 (3 Tammuz 5742) in Massachusetts General Hospital, Boston, at the age of 63. His funeral processions in Lakewood and Jerusalem were attended by tens of thousands, with an additional stop in Borough Park, Brooklyn attended by 30,000. He was buried near his father, Rabbi Aharon Kotler, and his grandfather, Rabbi Isser Zalman Meltzer, on Har HaMenuchot.

Kotler was married to Rischel and had eight children and fifteen grandchildren. His widow, Rischel, died at her home in Lakewood on July 17, 2015.

Kotler served as rosh yeshiva for nineteen years, seven months, and one day, exactly the same amount of time as did his father. This coincidence was noted throughout the Torah world and seen as a sign that he had been a worthy son and successor who carried on his father's mission.

He was succeeded as rosh yeshiva by his son, Rabbi Malkiel Kotler, alongside his son-in-law Rabbi Dovid Schustal, and Rabbis Yerucham Olshin and Yisroel Neuman, who are married to other grandchildren of Rabbi Aharon Kotler.

== Sources ==
- Dershowitz, Rabbi Yitzchok (2006). The Legacy Of Maran Rav Aharon Kotler. Feldheim Publishers. ISBN 1-58330-875-X.
