= Yitzchak Abadi =

Venezuelan-born American Haredi rabbi (1933–2025)

Rabbi Yitzchak Abadi
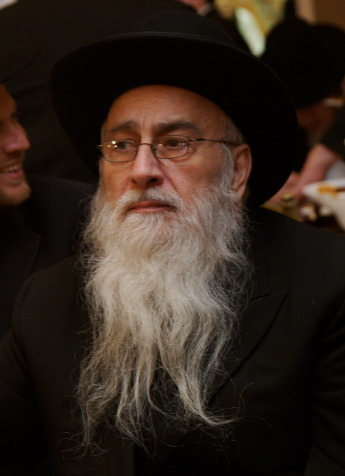
- Abadi in 2008
- Title: Posek

Personal life
- Born: March 12, 1933 Venezuela
- Died: December 16, 2025 (aged 92) Lakewood, New Jersey, U.S.
- Spouse: Chaya
- Children: Esther, Chaim Yisrael, Eliyahu Zev, Avraham, Nechama, Aaron, Yehuda, Rivka
- Occupation: Rabbi

Religious life
- Religion: Judaism
- Denomination: Haredi – Orthodox Judaism

Jewish leader
- Position: Rosh Kollel
- Yeshiva: Kollel Ohel Torah, Lakewood Township, New Jersey
- Residence: Lakewood, New Jersey, U.S.

Yitzchak Abadi (March 12, 1933 – December 16, 2025) was a Venezuelan-born American Orthodox rabbi and posek. He was a prominent leader of Orthodox Judaism in the United States and elsewhere.

== Early life ==
Yitzchak Abadi was born in Caracas (Venezuela) to a Syrian-Jewish family from Aleppo. He moved with his parents to Tiberias, Mandatory Palestine at age 2. As a child, Abadi attended school in Haifa. His studies began at Yeshivat HaYishuv HeHadash in Tel Aviv, Israel and continued in Yeshivat Chevron in Jerusalem. At 19 years old, he was sent by the Chazon Ish to study in Montreux, Switzerland. A year later, the Chazon Ish sent Abadi to study in Lakewood, New Jersey under Aharon Kotler.

== Career ==
Abadi emerged as one of the leading poskim for the Lakewood community. Rabbi Shlomo Gissinger Zt”l, who was his Talmid Muvhak, predeceased in 2019. He branched out on his own there in 1980, opening a premier halakha (Jewish law) Kollel. In 1993, he transferred his Kollel to Har Nof, Jerusalem, where it continued to produce scholars trained to decide halakhic questions touching on every aspect of Jewish law. Abadi moved back to Lakewood in 2009.

=== Notable decisions ===
Holding his Megilla on Purim 2013

Owing to his prominence as a posek, Abadi was asked the most difficult questions, in which he issued a number of innovative and controversial decisions. He ruled that it is permitted to write a sefer torah through a silk screen process, although this decision was contested by J. David Bleich. Abadi ruled that wigs made with Indian tonsured hair may be used. He also composed a short version of Birkat Hamazon—based on the Rambam and other Rishonim—for those who find it difficult to recite the full version, who may use it ab initio.

== Death ==
Abadi died in Lakewood, New Jersey, on December 16, 2025, at the age of 92.

== Works ==
- Ohr Yitzchak - 2 Volumes
- Laws of Nidah / קיצור הלכות נדה (in English and Hebrew). Jerusalem: Kashrut.org. 2004. OCLC 1340647963.
- Birkat Hamazon Hakatzar (based on the views of the Rambam and the other Rishonim)
