= Shlomo Brevda =

American-born rabbi (1931–2013)

Rabbi Shlomo Leib Brevda

Personal life
- Born: 1931
- Died: January 2013 (aged 81–82)

Religious life
- Religion: Judaism

Jewish leader
- Yahrtzeit: 26 Tevet, 5773

Shlomo Leib Brevda (1931 – January 2013) was an American-born rabbi, inspirational Torah leader and mashpia who authored numerous books. Growing up as an average American boy, he attended Yeshiva University’s Rabbi Isaac Elchanan Theological Seminary (RIETS) with plans to pursue a college education. However, he was advised by RIETS’s Rabbi Yeruchim Gorelik to pursue his learning elsewhere; thus, he joined the Mir Yeshiva following its escape from the Holocaust and became a disciple of Rabbi Chatzkel Levenstein, the yeshiva's mashgiach ruchani. In the 1950s he moved to Israel. Much of Shlomo's writing was about musar and the Vilna Gaon, of whom he was a descendant. He was survived by his wife and their "six children, Reb Chaike, Reb Velvel, Reb Aharon, Rachel Altusky, Frume Yasolvsky and Estie Druk."

== Works ==
- Biyur on the Peirush HaGra on Yonah
- Miracles of Chanukah
- The Miracles of Purim

His first work, Ameilus HaTorah, was published anonymously.
