= Yerucham Olshin =

American rabbi

Rabbi Yerucham Olshin Shlitah
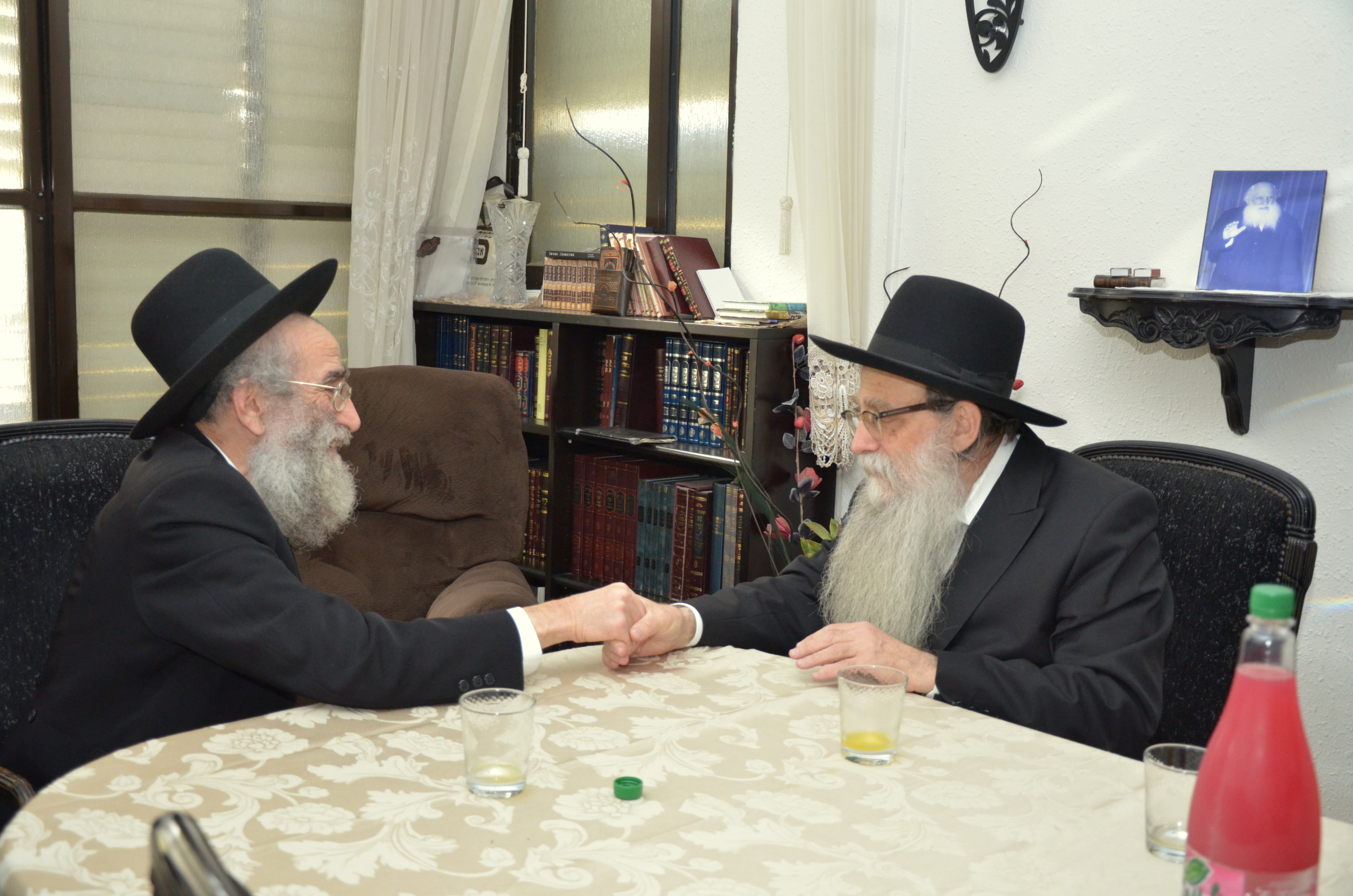
- Rabbi Olshin (right) with Rabbi Markowitz, rosh yeshiva of Ponovezh
- Title: Rav

Personal life
- Born: Yerucham Olshin
- Spouse: Shalva Schwartzman
- Children: Reb Isser Zalman Olshin

Religious life
- Religion: Judaism
- Yeshiva: Beth Medrash Govoha
- Position: Rosh yeshiva

Yerucham Olshin is an Orthodox rabbi and a member of the Moetzes Gedolei HaTorah (Council of Torah Sages). He is one of the four roshei yeshiva (deans) of Beth Medrash Govoha, an Orthodox yeshiva located in Lakewood, New Jersey.

Olshin's works about Jewish holidays have been published under the title Yareach L'Moadim. Olshin was a student of Rabbis Eliyahu Moshe Shisgal (son in law of Rabbi Moshe Feinstein), Abba Berman, and Shneur Kotler. He is married to Shalva, who is the daughter of Rabbi Dov Schwartzman, and granddaughter of the founder of the yeshiva, Rabbi Aharon Kotler.
