= Beth Medrash Govoha =

Largest yeshiva in the US

Coordinates: 40.09562°N 74.22207°W

- בית מדרש גבוה
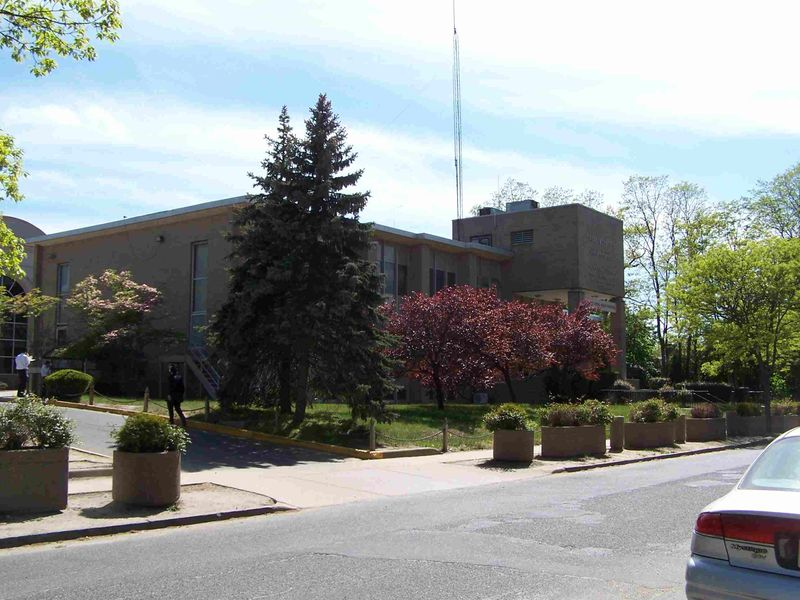
- Lakewood Township, New Jersey; United States

Information
- Other name: Lakewood Yeshiva (unofficial)
- Type: Beis medrash and kollel
- Religious affiliation: Haredi
- Established: 1943
- Dean: Rabbi Yerucham Olshin; Rabbi Dovid Schustal; Rabbi Malkiel Kotler; Rabbi Yisrael Neuman
- Enrollment: 4,027 (undergraduate); 5,630 (graduate) (2024)
- Website: https://bmg.edu

Beth Medrash Govoha (Hebrew: בית מדרש גבוה, pronounced: Beis Medrash Gavo'ha. lit: "High House of Learning"; also known as Lakewood Yeshiva or BMG) is a Haredi Jewish Litvishe yeshiva in Lakewood Township, New Jersey. It was founded by Rabbi Aharon Kotler in 1943 and is the second-largest yeshiva in the world, after Mir Yeshiva in Jerusalem. As of 2024, it had 9,657 students, between bochurim (unmarried members) and married with Kollel status. The principal Rosh yeshiva since 1982 is Rabbi Malkiel Kotler. Talmud and halakha studies in the institution are carried in the form of over 200 small groups, Chaburos, which consist of several students mentored by a veteran, each pursuing its own specific curriculum with an emphasis on individual learning.

== History ==
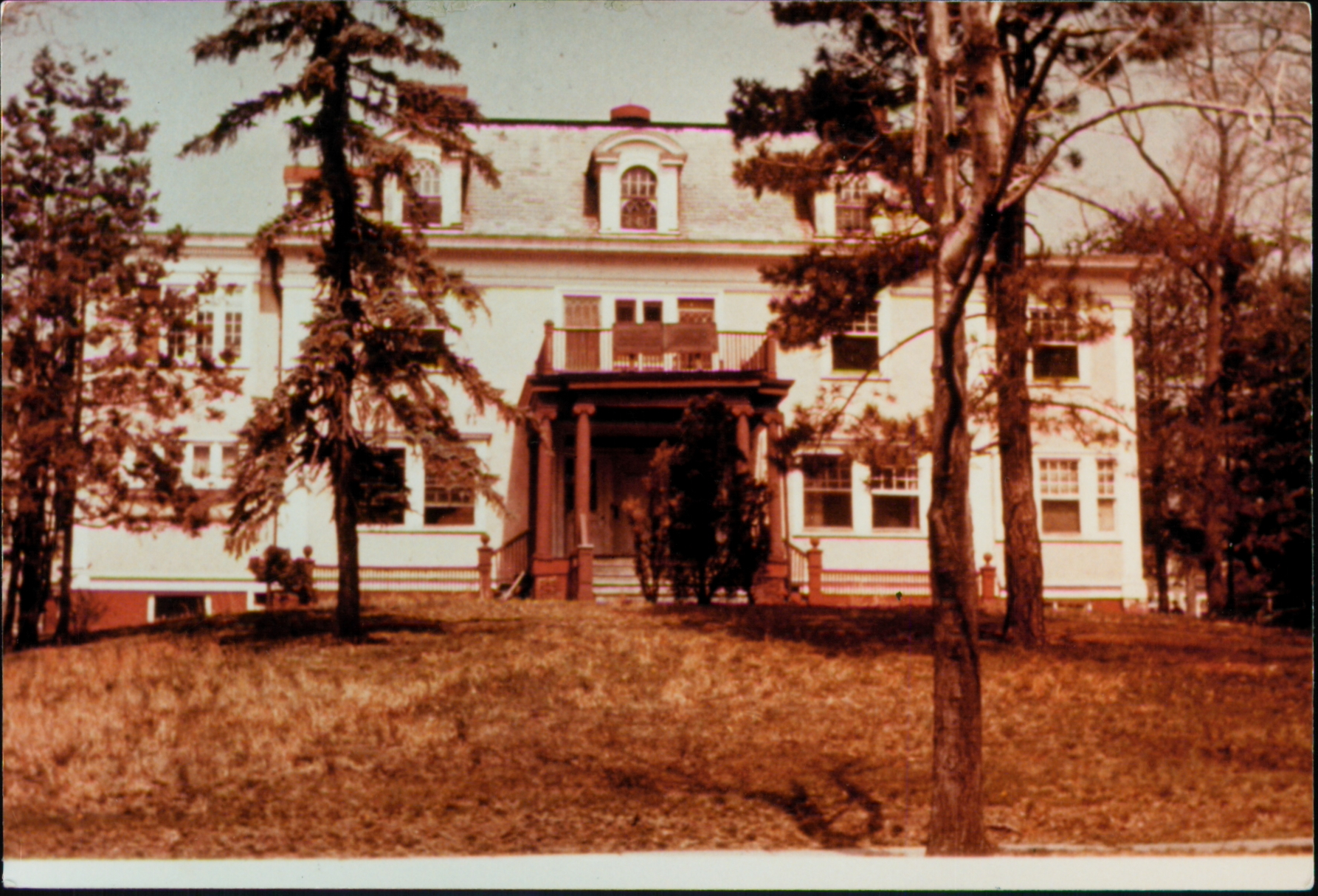
BMG - 7th Street Study Hall 1943

Beth Medrash Govoha was originally established as a kollel with 20 students in White Plains, New York, in 1942, by Rabbis Nosson Meir Wachtfogel, Shmuel Schecter, and Hershel Genauer, alumni of the Kelm Talmud Torah in Lithuania. It was the first kollel in the United States. When Rabbi Aharon Kotler came to New York from Europe in 1943, the kollel members asked him to lead the institution. Kotler agreed on the condition that it be move away from New York City and that he would be granted final say on matters related to curriculum and policy. The yeshiva relocated to Lakewood Township, New Jersey, and opened with an initial enrollment of 14 students.

Beth Medrash Govoha is a successor institution to Yeshivas Etz Chaim, which was located in Slutzk, in what is today Belarus. That institution was led by Rabbi Isser Zalman Meltzer and by Rabbi Aaron Kotler, until it was forcibly closed after the Russian Revolution of 1917, which banned all forms of Jewish studies. Etz Chaim was reestablished in Kletzk, under then Polish rule by Rabbi Aaron Kotler, where it thrived until World War II and the destruction of much of European Jewry. Rabbi Kotler escaped the Nazis in 1941 and came to the United States where he opened BMG in 1943.

== Description ==
BMG's four campuses are located on 35 acres (0.14 km^{2}) in Lakewood, with numerous academic facilities, libraries and residence halls.

The newest building was completed in the summer of 2015, on the land where Bais Eliyahu (the "trailers") used to be. It was first used on Rosh Hashanah 5776, seating over one thousand people for the services. The building was sponsored by Ralph Herzka and Meir Levine.

The yeshiva is licensed by the New Jersey Commission on Higher Education and accredited by the Association of Advanced Rabbinical and Talmudic Schools. It is authorized to grant bachelor's and master's degrees in Talmudics, as well as two post-master's diplomas in Talmudics. What students seek in Beth Medrash Govoha is to at first attain the skills necessary to properly understand and analyze the Talmud and to be able to do independent research on a scholarly level, and then use these skills to become accomplished Talmudic scholars.

Beth Medrash Govoha is a postgraduate institution and the general age of entry for new students is about 22. A high level of analytic skill and comprehension in understanding the Talmud is required, to the extent that a student is able to study a subject from the starting point all the way to the most complex areas of that subject on his own. The yeshiva does not have a remedial program for weak or unprepared students, and reaching the level required to be a successful student at the yeshiva takes several years of intense, full-time study. As such, in general, only students who have already studied in an undergraduate level yeshiva geared for students aged 18–22, will be accepted.

== Curriculum ==
The yeshiva studies are based on classical Torah study traditions using the Talmud, Rishonim, Shulchan Aruch, Responsa, and Rabbinic literature as texts and sources.

=== Subjects ===
Although all students study the Talmud regardless of whether they just joined the yeshiva or have already been studying for well over a decade, when students first arrive they study the mesechta (Talmudic tractate) that the yeshiva has officially selected to study at that time. This mesechta will always be one of eight that deal with areas of civil law. Some students will continue learning these subjects for many years, developing great expertise in these areas, while others will study other areas of the Talmud. Some students focus primarily on the practical application of the talmudic laws based on the Halachic conclusions of the Shulchan Aruch. Because of the large number of students in the Yeshiva there are groups studying virtually every subject in the Talmud. Beth Medrash Govoha is unique among Yeshivas in that a student can study any subject in the Talmud or Halachah that he prefers.

=== Schedule ===
The daily schedule consists of three sedarim (study sessions) – a morning session, an afternoon session, and an evening session, in which a total of 10 hours of each day is spent studying. For each session there is a limud (subject) which is a chapter of the mesechta that that group is learning. The morning session is the most important of the sessions and is the subject that students will devote their after-hours time to and are most likely to write papers on; it is also the subject of the lectures.

=== Chaburah system ===
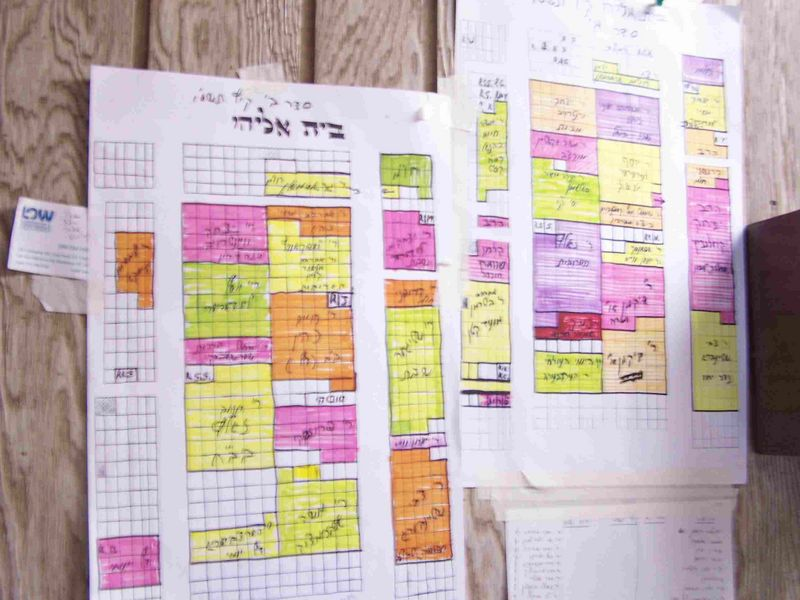
A colored map hanging in one of the study halls designating where each chaburah (study group) sits.

All learning is done within a system of chaburos (study groups) in which 15 to 200 scholars are seated together to study the same subject at the same pace with their individual chavrusa (study partner). Every chaburah is headed by a rosh chaburah (head/leader of the study group). The rosh chaburah is typically somebody that is more advanced than the members of the chaburah and his primary function is to assist the chabura in their studies. Additionally some roshai chaburah assist in pairing the members of their chaburah with an appropriate chavrusah (study partner). Most roshei chaburah will study the material on their own time so that they are proficient and thoroughly knowledgeable on the subject. Some roshai chaburah (plural of rosh hachaburah) also give a weekly discourse on the topic that was studied that week. Many of the chaburos require members themselves to prepare and give discourses of their own on a rotating basis. Other responsibilities of the rosh chaburah include submitting the number of seats needed for the members of his chaburah, and to decide the topic of study for the semester.

== Programs, testing and acceptance ==
=== Semesters/Zmanim ===
Three zmanim (semesters) exist in a year, based on the Hebrew calendar:

1. Winter zman, which is from Rosh Chodesh Cheshvan through the seventh of Nisan.
2. Summer zman from Rosh Chodesh Iyar through the tenth of Av.
3. Elul zman from Rosh Chodesh Elul through the eleventh of Tishrei.

The three zmanim span two official semesters. The Fall semester runs through the Winter zman. The Spring semester includes the Summer zman and Elul zman.

=== Application ===
Applications to enroll into the yeshiva are accepted twice a year, before the summer and winter semesters. There are no enrollments for the fall semester. The deadlines vary, and they are generally close to the 1st of Elul for the winter enrollment, and the 1st of Adar for summer enrollment.

=== Testing and acceptance ===
This is generally a four-part process. Only applicants who have received a "bechina (entrance exam) card" authorizing them to advance will be able to proceed with these steps:

1. The applicant completes a secondary registration application which asks for additional, detailed information that was not required on the original application.
2. The admissions officer holds a general interview with the applicant. With him are usually one or two other members of the faculty. The meeting will usually be short, allowing the admissions department an opportunity to evaluate the candidate's general potential for success in the institute.
3. A faculty member tests the candidate in general Talmudic knowledge. A grade is issued, on a scale of one to five, reflecting the applicant's possession of the requisite knowledge.
4. One of the four roshei yeshiva (deans) listens to a Pilpul, or talmudic discourse, from the applicant. This part of the exam is to test the applicant's ability to engage in specialized Talmudic reasoning called Lomdus. Here too, a grade is issued on a scale of one to five.
5. After completing the two exams acceptance will depend on a combination of all the factors in the admissions process. Usually applicants are notified during Chol HaMoed about the decision. If the applicant is accepted, he and his parents are then required to set up a meeting with the tuition department to discuss tuition arrangements. However it is the policy of the yeshiva that no eligible student be denied the opportunity to study Torah because of an inability to pay tuition.

=== Alumni program ===
Shivti, the yarchei kallah program, is a highly acclaimed weekly Sunday program for laymen. The shivti was created by Rav Yaakov Tescher.

=== Registration ===
After acceptance, tuition is negotiated. The stated policy of the yeshiva is that no eligible student is denied the opportunity to study Torah because of their inability to pay tuition. The accepted student must also complete steps required by the State of New Jersey of all students entering dormitories and post-secondary schools in New Jersey. Additionally, in a signed acceptance agreement, the matriculating student agrees to abide by the rules of the institution.

"The freezer" is a three-month period in which new students may not date while acclimating to the yeshiva.

== Tumult day ==
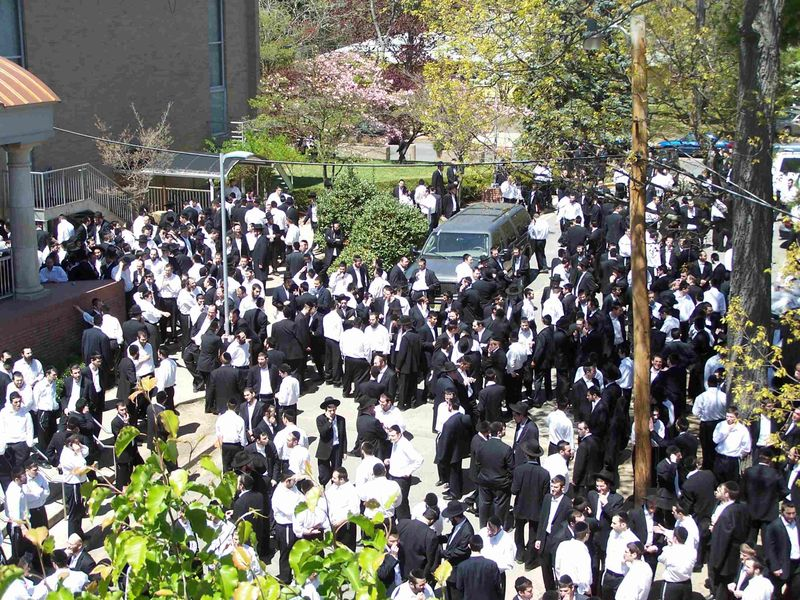
Tumult day in Beth Medrash Govoha outside the main and Beren buildings

By long-standing institutional tradition, each semester begins with the majority of students exploring the many study groups (called "Chaburos") available in each field of study and choosing the one that they find of greatest interest. They then pair up with a study partner, who will join them in their study group. As the first days back on campus for returning students, and the first ever day for new students, the atmosphere can seem tumultuous, with much milling about, good spirit and cheer, hence that day has become known as "Tumult day," during which little study takes place and instead much socializing along with the more serious work of choosing both study group and study partner.

== Leadership ==
Rabbi Aharon Kotler served as the academic and spiritual leader of the institution, from 1943 until his passing in 1962. He was succeeded by Rabbi Shneur Kotler, then 44 years old, who died in 1982. Today, Rabbi Malkiel Kotler, Rabbi Shneur's son, and Rabbis Yerucham Olshin, Dovid Schustal, and Yisroel Neuman, serve in that role. Rabbi Aaron Kotler, a grandson of Rabbi Aharon Kotler, was President and CEO of the institution until he retired towards the end of 2021.

Rabbi Nosson Meir Wachtfogel served as dean of students (mashgiach ruchani) from the mid 1950s until his death in 1998, he was succeeded by Rabbi Matisyohu Salomon until his death in 2024 and Rabbi Abba Brudny. In January 2026 Rabbi Reuven Hechster, Mashgiach in Mir-Brachfeld, was Appointed Mashgiach Of BMG. Other mashgichim in the yeshiva have included Rabbi Yehuda Jacobs, Rabbi Aharon Schustal, Rabbi Eliezer Stefansky, and Rabbi Yaakov Pollack.

== Notable alumni ==
- Yitzchak Abadi (born 1933), rabbi, posek, rosh kollel
- Philip Berg (1927–2013), rabbi who was dean of the worldwide Kabbalah Centre organization
- Elya Brudny (born 1948), rosh yeshiva, Mir Yeshiva of Brooklyn
- Shlomo Carlebach (1925–1994), musician
- José Faur (1934–2020), rabbi and professor
- Shraga Feivish Hager (1948–2024), Kosover Rebbe
- Moshe Hirsch, head of the Neturei Karta group in Israel
- Moshe Hillel Hirsch, rosh yeshiva, Slabodka yeshiva, Bnai Brak, Israel
- Yaakov Yitzchak Horowitz, rabbi
- Yehudah Jacobs (c. 1935–2020), rabbi and mashgiach ruchani in Beth Medrash Govoha
- Shmuel Kamenetsky rosh yeshiva, Talmudical Yeshiva of Philadelphia
- Yosef Yitzchok Lerner, rabbinical ordinator
- Uri Mayerfeld, rosh yeshiva, Yeshivas Ner Yisroel, Toronto
- Shlomo Miller, rosh kollel, Kollel Avreichim Institute for Advanced Talmud Study, Toronto
- Yaakov Pearlman, Chief Rabbi of Ireland
- Yechiel Perr, rosh yeshiva, Yeshiva of Far Rockaway
- Aharon Pfeuffer, rosh yeshiva in London and Johannesburg, known for his works on Kashrut
- Aaron Rakeffet-Rothkoff, rabbi
- Ezra Schochet, rosh yeshiva, Yeshiva Ohr Elchonon Chabad/West Coast Talmudical Seminary, Los Angeles
- Dov Schwartzman, rosh yeshiva, Talmudical Yeshiva of Philadelphia and Yeshivas Bais Hatalmud, Jerusalem
- Eli Baruch Shulman, rosh yeshiva, Rabbi Isaac Elchanan Theological Seminary (RIETS)
- Meir Stern, rosh yeshiva, Yeshiva Gedola of Passaic
- Elya Svei, rosh yeshiva, Talmudical Yeshiva of Philadelphia
- Yisroel Taplin, Talmudic scholar and author
- Hillel Zaks, rosh yeshiva, Chevron and Knesset Hagedola, Israel

== See also ==
- Lakewood East, an institution in Israel that is loosely affiliated with BMG
- Talmudical Yeshiva of Philadelphia
