= Lakewood Township, New Jersey =

Township in Ocean County, New Jersey, US

- Township
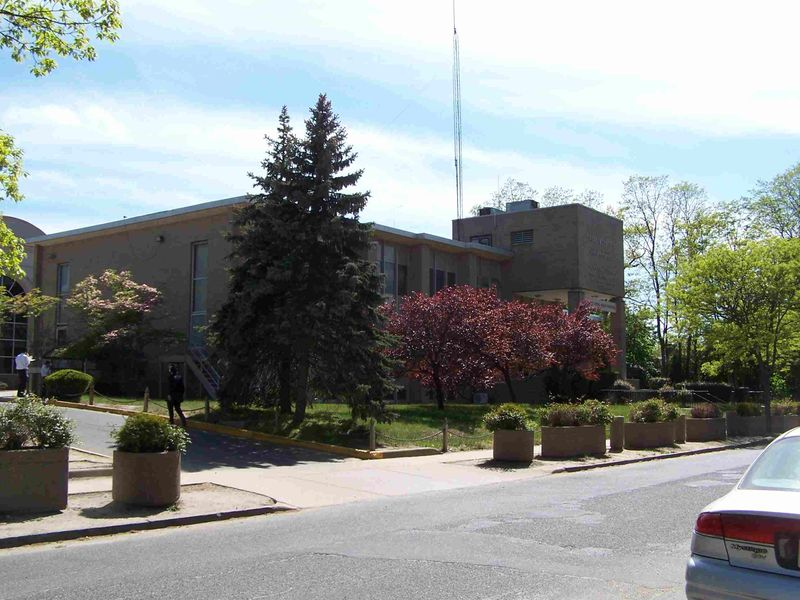
- Beth Medrash Govoha, the largest yeshiva outside of Israel

- Seal

- Location of Lakewood Township in Ocean County highlighted in red (right). Inset map: Location of Ocean County in New Jersey highlighted in orange (left).

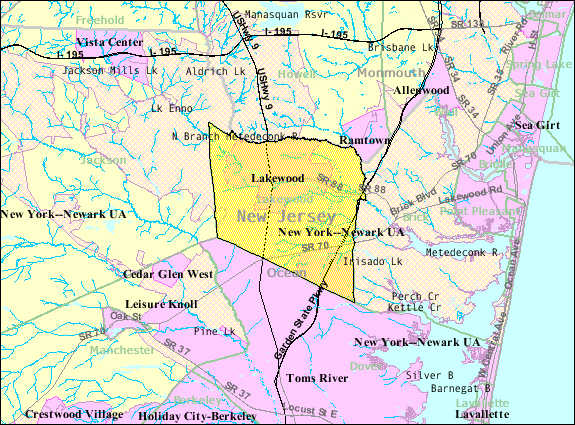
- Census Bureau map of Lakewood Township, New Jersey
- Interactive map of Lakewood Township, New Jersey
- Location in Ocean County Location in New Jersey Location in the United States
- Coordinates: 40.077069°N 74.19851°W
- Country: United States
- State: New Jersey
- County: Ocean
- Incorporated: March 23, 1892

Government
  - Type: Township
  - Body: Township Committee
  - Mayor: Raymond G. Coles (D) (term ends December 31, 2026)
  - Manager: Patrick Donnelly
  - Municipal clerk: Lauren Kirkman

Area
  - Total: 25.08 sq mi (64.95 km^{2})
  - Land: 24.68 sq mi (63.92 km^{2})
  - Water: 0.40 sq mi (1.03 km^{2}) 1.59%
  - Rank: 108th of 565 in state 12th of 33 in county
- Elevation: 49 ft (15 m)

Population (2020)
  - Total: 135,158
  - Estimate (2025): 143,765 ▲
  - Rank: 4th of 565 in state (2023); 1st of 33 in county
  - Density: 5,825/sq mi (2,249/km^{2})
  - Rank: 100th of 565 in state 1st of 33 in county 199th in U.S. (2021)
- Time zone: UTC−05:00 (Eastern (EST))
  - Summer (DST): UTC−04:00 (Eastern (EDT))
- ZIP Code: 08701
- Area code: 732, 848
- FIPS code: 34-38550
- GNIS ID: 882076
- Website: www.lakewoodnj.gov

Lakewood Township is the most populous township in Ocean County, in the U.S. state of New Jersey. A rapidly growing community, as of the 2020 United States census, the township's population was 135,158, its highest decennial count ever and an increase of 42,315 (+45.6%) from the 2010 census count of 92,843, which in turn reflected an increase of 32,491 (+53.8%) from the 60,352 counted in the 2000 census. The township ranked as the fifth-most-populous municipality in the state in 2020, after ranking seventh in 2010, and 22nd in 2000, placing the township only behind the state's four biggest cities (Newark; Jersey City; Paterson; Elizabeth). The sharp increase in population from 2000 to 2010 was led largely by increases in the township's Orthodox Jewish and Latino communities. Further growth in the Orthodox community led to a sharp increase in population in the 2020 census, with a large number of births leading to a significant drop in the township's median age. The Census Bureau's Population Estimates Program calculated that the township's population was 141,985 in 2024, helping the fast-growing township surpass Elizabeth as the fourth-most-populous municipality in the state.

As a major hub of Orthodox Judaism, Lakewood is home to Beth Medrash Govoha, the largest yeshiva outside of Israel. The large Orthodox population, which comprises more than half the township's population, strongly influences the township's culture and wields considerable political clout in the township as a voting bloc.

== History ==
The earliest documented European settlement of the present Lakewood area was by operators of sawmills, from about 1750 forward. One such sawmill—located at the east end of the present Lake Carasaljo—was known as Three Partners Mill from at least 1789 until at least 1814. From 1815 until 1818, in the same area, Jesse Richards had an iron-smelting operation known as Washington Furnace, using the local bog iron ore. The ironworks were revived in 1833 by Joseph W. Brick, who named the business Bergen Iron Works, which also became the name of the accompanying township. In 1865, the community was renamed Bricksburg, and in 1880, it was renamed Lakewood and became a fashionable winter resort.

Lakewood's developers thought that "Bricksburg" did not capture their vision for the community, and the names "Brightwood" and "Lakewood" were proposed. After reaching out to area residents, "Lakewood" was chosen, and the United States Postal Service approved the name in March 1880. The name "Lakewood" was intended to focus on the location near lakes and pine forests.

Lakewood was incorporated as a township by an act of the New Jersey Legislature on March 23, 1892, from portions of Brick Township. Portions of Howell Township in Monmouth County were annexed to Lakewood Township in 1929.

Lakewood's three most prominent hotels were the Laurel House (opened in 1880; closed in 1932), the Lakewood Hotel (opened January 1891, closed in 1925), and the Laurel-in-the-Pines (opened December 1891, burned down in 1967). Lakewood's promoters claimed that its winter temperature was usually about ten degrees warmer than that of New York City and were warmer than points located further south, but this claim is not substantiated by official records of the United States Weather Bureau. During the 1890s, Lakewood was a resort for the rich and famous, and The New York Times devoted a weekly column to the activities of Lakewood society. Grover Cleveland spent the winters of 1891–1892 and 1892–1893 in a cottage near the Lakewood Hotel, commuting to his business in New York City. This cottage became part of the Tuberculosis Preventorium for Children in 1909. Mark Twain also enjoyed vacationing in Lakewood. George Jay Gould I acquired an estate at Lakewood in 1896, which is now Georgian Court University. John D. Rockefeller bought a property in 1902 which later became Ocean County Park. Lakewood's hotel business remained strong in the 1920s and 1950s, but went into severe decline in the 1960s.

In 1943, Aharon Kotler founded Beth Medrash Govoha. In time, it would grow to become the largest yeshiva outside of Israel. In the 1960s, much of the woods and cranberry bogs in the township were replaced by large housing developments. Leisure Village, a condominium retirement development on the south side of Route 70, opened for sale in 1963.

== Geography ==
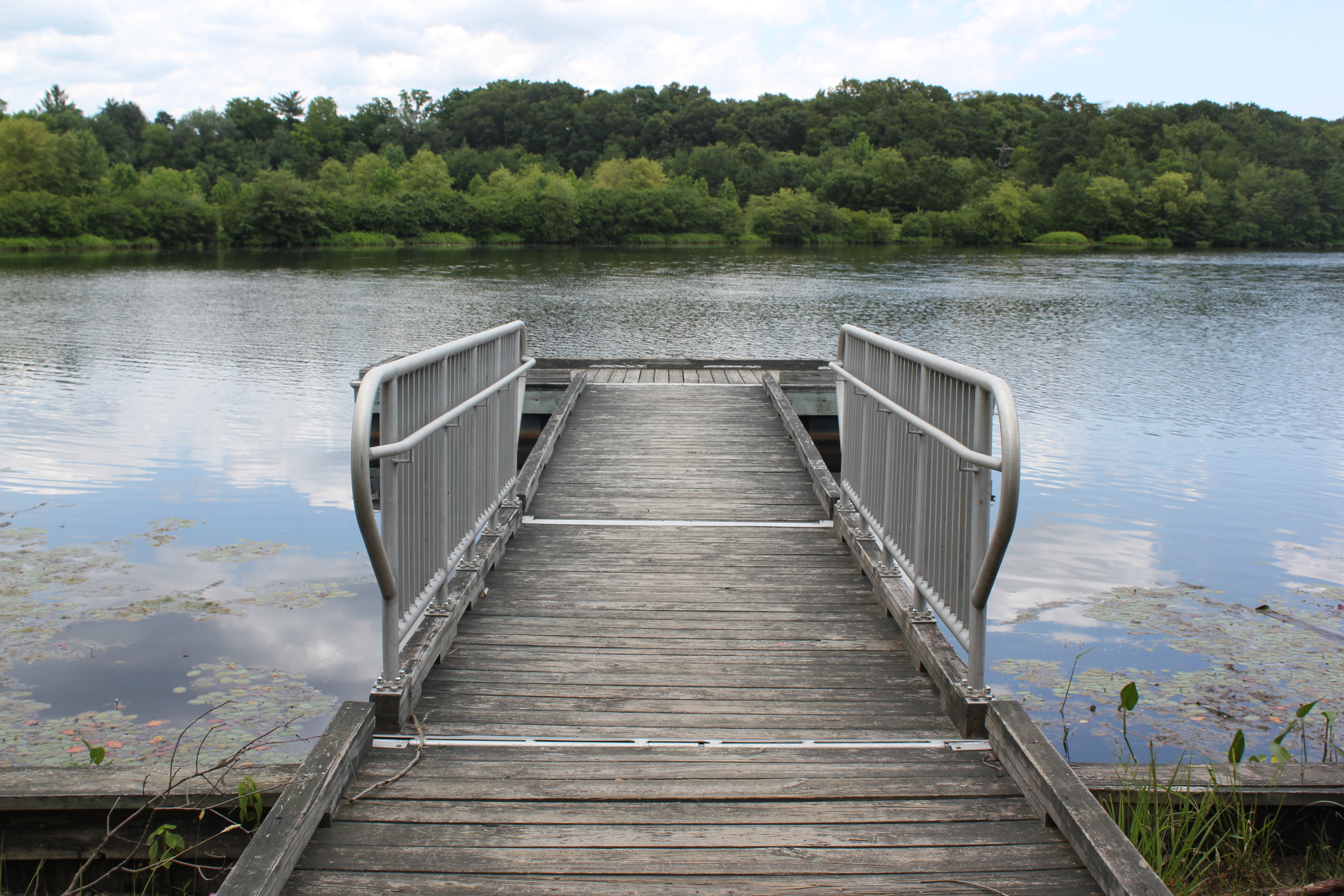
Lake Shenandoah

According to the United States Census Bureau, the township had a total area of 25.08 square miles (64.95 km^{2}), including 24.68 square miles (63.92 km^{2}) of land and 0.40 square miles (1.03 km^{2}) of water (1.59%). Lying on the coastal plain, Lakewood is a fairly flat place: three-quarters of it is 20 to 80 feet (6.1 to 24.4 m) above sea level, and its highest point is about 150 feet (46 m).

The North Branch of the Metedeconk River forms the northern boundary and part of the eastern boundary of the township, while the South Branch runs through the township. A southern portion of the township is drained by the north branch of Kettle Creek. As implied in its name, Lakewood township has four lakes, all of them man-made; three of them—Lake Carasaljo, Manetta, and Shenandoah—are on the South Branch of the Metedeconk River, whereas the fourth—Lake Waddill—is on Kettle Creek.

Lakewood CDP (2020 Census population of 69,398), Leisure Village (4,966) and Leisure Village East (4,189) are unincorporated communities and census-designated places (CDPs) located within Lakewood Township.

Other unincorporated communities, localities and place names located partially or completely within the township include Greenville, Lake Carasaljo, Seven Stars and South Lakewood.

The township borders the municipalities of Brick Township, Jackson Township, and Toms River in Ocean County; and Howell Township in Monmouth County.

The township, including a portion of its southwestern portion, is one of 11 municipalities in Ocean County that are part of the Toms River watershed.

== Demographics ==
Historical population
Census	Pop.	Note	%±
1880	1,044		—
1900	3,094		—
1910	5,149		66.4%
1920	6,110		18.7%
1930	7,869		28.8%
1940	8,502		8.0%
1950	10,809		27.1%
1960	16,020		48.2%
1970	25,233		57.5%
1980	38,464		52.4%
1990	45,048		17.1%
2000	60,352		34.0%
2010	92,843		53.8%
2020	135,158		45.6%
2025 (est.)	143,765	▲	6.4%
Population sources: 1880 1900-2000 1900-1920; 1900-1910 1910-1930; 1940–2000 2000; 2010 2020 2024

A study of Jewish communities published under the auspices of the Berman Jewish DataBank estimated that Lakewood had a total Jewish population of 54,500 in 2009, about 59% of the township's 2010 population. NJ.com estimated in 2018 that two-thirds of the township's residents, or about 90,000 people, were Orthodox Jews.

After the Second World War, Lakewood had a significant Estonian population. The community had an Estonian-language Saturday school, church, Boy Scout troop, and folk dance group.

The median value of owner occupied housing is $322,000 with an average mortgage of $2,216 and additional housing expenses of $807. The median gross rent is $1,463.

=== 2020 census ===
Lakewood Township, New Jersey – Racial and ethnic composition Note: the US Census treats Hispanic/Latino as an ethnic category. This table excludes Latinos from the racial categories and assigns them to a separate category. Hispanics/Latinos may be of any race.
Race / Ethnicity (NH = Non-Hispanic)	Pop 1990	Pop 2000	Pop 2010	Pop 2020	% 1990	% 2000	% 2010	% 2020
White alone (NH)	33,685	42,816	70,005	111,388	74.78%	70.94%	75.40%	82.41%
Black or African American alone (NH)	5,995	6,878	5,346	3,290	13.31%	11.40%	5.76%	2.43%
Native American or Alaska Native alone (NH)	71	40	39	91	0.16%	0.07%	0.04%	0.07%
Asian alone (NH)	593	799	737	699	1.32%	1.32%	0.79%	0.52%
Pacific Islander alone (NH)	N/A	5	6	7	N/A	0.01%	0.01%	0.01%
Other race alone (NH)	54	114	74	2,056	0.12%	0.19%	0.08%	1.52%
Mixed race or Multiracial (NH)	N/A	765	574	1,859	N/A	1.27%	0.62%	1.38%
Hispanic or Latino (any race)	4,650	8,935	16,062	15,768	10.32%	14.80%	17.30%	11.67%
Total	45,048	60,352	92,843	135,158	100.00%	100.00%	100.00%	100.00%

=== 2010 census ===
The 2010 United States census counted 92,843 people, 24,283 households, and 17,362 families in the township. The population density was 3,777.7 inhabitants per square mile (1,458.6/km^{2}). There were 26,337 housing units at an average density of 1,071.6 per square mile (413.7/km^{2}). The racial makeup was 84.33% (78,290) White, 6.35% (5,898) Black or African American, 0.30% (276) Native American, 0.84% (777) Asian, 0.02% (14) Pacific Islander, 6.68% (6,199) from other races, and 1.50% (1,389) from two or more races. Hispanic or Latino of any race were 17.30% (16,062) of the population.

Of the 24,283 households, 43.2% had children under the age of 18; 58.5% were married couples living together; 9.1% had a female householder with no husband present and 28.5% were non-families. Of all households, 24.6% were made up of individuals and 16.4% had someone living alone who was 65 years of age or older. The average household size was 3.73 and the average family size was 4.49.

41.8% of the population were under the age of 18, 10.3% from 18 to 24, 24.6% from 25 to 44, 11.1% from 45 to 64, and 12.2% who were 65 years of age or older. The median age was 23.9 years. For every 100 females, the population had 98.7 males. For every 100 females ages 18 and older there were 94.0 males.

The Census Bureau's 2006-2010 American Community Survey showed that (in 2010 inflation-adjusted dollars) median household income was $41,527 (with a margin of error of +/− $1,797) and the median family income was $45,420 (+/− $2,296). Males had a median income of $39,857 (+/− $4,206) versus $32,699 (+/− $2,365) for females. The per capita income for the township was $16,430 (+/− $565). About 21.9% of families and 26.1% of the population were below the poverty line, including 36.0% of those under age 18 and 5.7% of those age 65 or over.

=== 2000 census ===
As of the 2000 United States census there were 60,352 people, 19,876 households, and 13,356 families residing in the township. The population density was 2,431.8 inhabitants per square mile (938.9/km^{2}). There were 21,214 housing units at an average density of 854.8 per square mile (330.0/km^{2}). The racial makeup of the township was 78.77% White, 12.05% African American, 0.17% Native American, 1.39% Asian, 0.03% Pacific Islander, 4.61% from other races, and 2.98% from two or more races. Hispanic or Latino of any race were 14.80% of the population.

There were 19,876 households, out of which 32.2% had children under the age of 18 living with them, 53.3% were married couples living together, 10.6% had a female householder with no husband present, and 32.8% were non-families. 28.5% of all households were made up of individuals, and 19.5% had someone living alone who was 65 years of age or older. The average household size was 2.92 and the average family size was 3.64.

In the township the population was spread out, with 31.8% under the age of 18, 10.1% from 18 to 24, 23.5% from 25 to 44, 15.7% from 45 to 64, and 18.9% who were 65 years of age or older. The median age was 31 years. For every 100 females, there were 91.6 males. For every 100 females age 18 and over, there were 85.5 males.

The median income for a household in the township was $35,634, and the median income for a family was $43,806. Males had a median income of $38,967 versus $26,645 for females. The per capita income for the township was $16,700. About 15.7% of families and 19.8% of the population were below the poverty line, including 28.9% of those under age 18 and 7.7% of those age 65 or over.

== Economy ==
Portions of the township are part of an Urban Enterprise Zone (UEZ), one of 32 zones covering 37 municipalities statewide. Lakewood was selected in 1994 as one of a group of 10 zones added to participate in the program. In addition to other benefits to encourage employment within the UEZ, shoppers can take advantage of a reduced 3.3125% sales tax rate (half of the 6 5/8% rate charged statewide) at eligible merchants. Established in November 1994, the township's Urban Enterprise Zone status expired in October 2025. The UEZ is overseen by the Lakewood Development Corporation, which works to foster the UEZ and the businesses that operate inside it through loan and grant programs.

== Education ==
Lakewood School District serves students in pre-kindergarten through twelfth grade, and is broken up into three different stages of schooling. As of the 2021–22 school year, the district, comprised of eight schools, had an enrollment of 5,433 students and 511.0 classroom teachers (on an FTE basis), for a student–teacher ratio of 10.6:1. Schools in the district (with 2021–22 enrollment data from the National Center for Education Statistics) are Lakewood Early Childhood Center with 247 students in PreK, Ella G. Clarke School with 375 students in grades 2-5, Clifton Avenue School with 387 students in grades 2-5, Oak Street School with 633 students in grades 1-5, Piner Elementary School with 415 students in grades PreK-1, Spruce Street School with 384 students in grades PreK-1, Lakewood Middle School with 1,126 students in grades 6-8 and Lakewood High School with 1,458 students in grades 9-12.

In recent years, the Lakewood School District has had budgetary issues, shutting down briefly in 2019 due to a funding deficit. The district spends more money on special education programs than any other district in the state and has a high bill for mandatory busing to non-public schools. Town leaders also cite imbalanced state funding formulas as the root of the district's financial problems.

Georgian Court University is a private, Roman Catholic university located on the shores of Lake Carasaljo. Founded in 1908 by the Sisters of Mercy as a women's college in North Plainfield, New Jersey, the school moved to the former estate of George Jay Gould I in Lakewood in 1924. Women made up 88% of the student population in Fall 2006.

There are many yeshivas and Jewish day schools serving the Orthodox Jewish community, with the school district providing busing to 18,000 students enrolled at 74 yeshivas as of 2011, and 25,000 by 2016. Beth Medrash Govoha, one of the world's largest yeshivas, had an enrollment in excess of 6,500. It is a post high school institution for higher education, where students primarily focus on the study of the Talmud and halakha (Jewish law).

The non-denominational Calvary Academy serves students in kindergarten through twelfth grade.

The Roman Catholic-affiliated Holy Family School served youth from preschool through eighth grade under the auspices of the Roman Catholic Diocese of Trenton. In 2014, the diocese announced that the school was closing at the end of the 2014–2015 school year, as fewer students were enrolling.

== Arts and culture ==
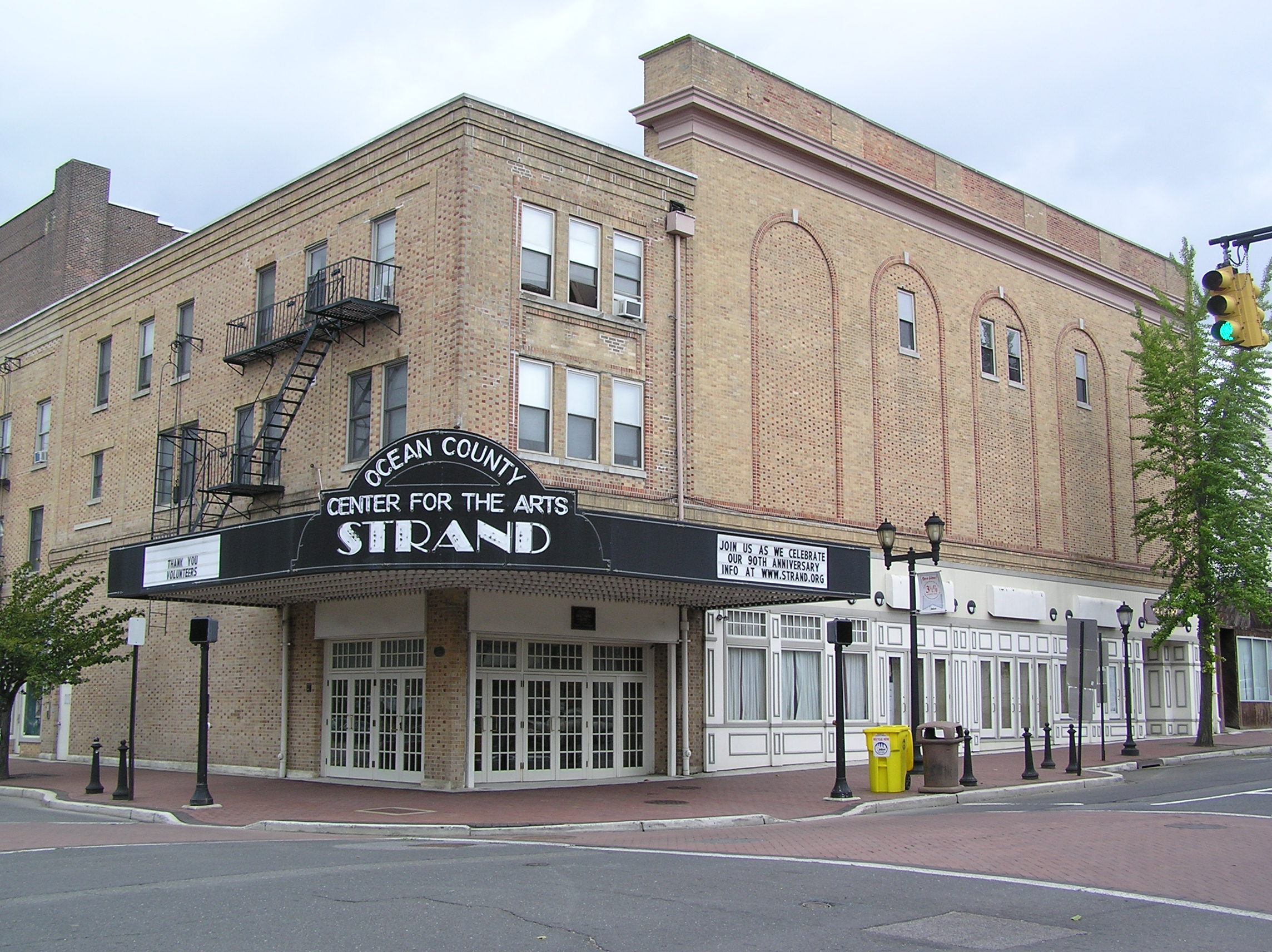
Strand Theater

The Strand Theater, established in 1922, was designed by architect Thomas W. Lamb.

== Sports ==
ShoreTown Ballpark, home of the Jersey Shore BlueClaws, is a 6,588-seat stadium constructed at a cost of $22 million through funds raised from the township's Urban Enterprise Zone.

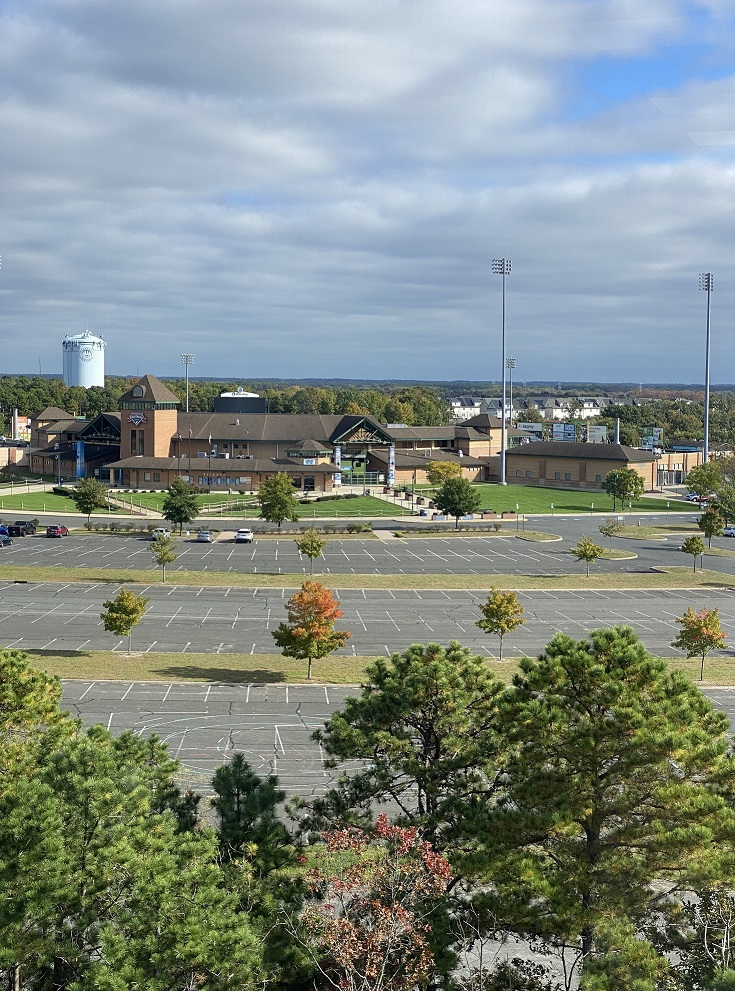
ShoreTown Ballpark—Blueclaws Stadium

The BlueClaws, previously known as the Lakewood Blue Claws, have led the league in attendance every year since its formation in 2001 up until 2011, with more than 380,000 fans in the 2001 season, representing an average attendance of more than 6,200 fans per game.

== Parks and recreation ==
Ocean County Park offers tennis courts, sports fields, hiking trails, beach volleyball, a driving range, swimming and cross-country skiing. Lakes Carasaljo and Shenandoah have canoe and kayak access, and jogging trails. The Sister Mary Grace Burns Arboretum is located on the campus of Georgian Court University.

== Government ==
=== Local government ===
Lakewood Township is governed under the Township form of New Jersey municipal government, one of 141 municipalities (of the 564) statewide that use this form, the second-most commonly used form of government in the state. The Township Committee is comprised of five members, who are elected directly by the voters at-large in partisan elections to serve three-year terms of office on a staggered basis, with either one or two seats coming up for election each year as part of the November general election in a three-year cycle. At an annual reorganization meeting, the Township Committee selects one of its members to serve as Mayor and another as Deputy Mayor.

The Township Committee controls all legislative powers of the Township except for health matters, which are controlled by the Board of Health. The Committee appoints members to boards, commissions, and committees. Each member of the township committee serves as a liaison to different divisions, departments and other committees.

The mayor, elected from among members of the committee, presides at meetings and performs other duties as the Township Committee may prescribe. The mayor has the power to appoint subcommittees with the consent of the committee. When authorized, the mayor may execute documents on behalf of the township, makes proclamations concerning holidays and events of interest, and exercises ceremonial power of the Township and other powers conferred by law.

As of 2025, the members of the Lakewood Township Committee are Mayor Raymond G. Coles (D, term on committee ends December 31, 2026; term as mayor ends 2025), Deputy mayor Menashe Miller (R, term on committee ends 2027; term as deputy mayor ends 2025), Albert Akerman (R, 2025), Deborah Fuentes (R, 2026) and Meir Lichtenstein (D, 2027).

==== Police ====
Lakewood Township is served by the Lakewood Police Department (LPD), which provides police protection for the township. Specialized units include Traffic and Safety, School Resource Officers, Special Response Team (SWAT), Dive Team, and a Motorcycle Patrol and Bicycle Patrol unit in the spring and summer. The current Chief of Police is Gregory Meyer.

==== Fire ====
Lakewood Township is served by the Lakewood Fire Department (LFD), a unified combination consisting of four Volunteer Fire Stations and one career fire station which provide fire protection for the township.

The fire department was founded in October 1888. The Board of Fire Commissioners was created in 1896. The first motorized equipment was purchased in 1915. The largest fire in township history occurred on April 20, 1940, when a forest fire destroyed over 50 structures and burned down most of the southern half of town. The largest loss of life caused by fire occurred on February 12, 1936, when the Victoria Mansion Hotel, valued at $100,000 (equivalent to $2.3 million in 2025), located on the southeast corner of Lexington Avenue and Seventh Street, was destroyed in a fire and 16 people died. The largest structure fire in department history occurred on March 29, 1967, when the block-long Laurel in the Pines Hotel was leveled by a suspicious fire that also killed three people. The last fire hose was picked up a week later when the fire was finally declared out.

There are 33 career firefighters (including a career Fire Chief) and approximately 50 volunteer firefighters.

The Chief of the Lakewood Fire Department is Jonathan Yahr.

===== Fire stations =====
Fire stations are located across the township:

- Engine Company 1 – Engine 1, Engine 11; 119 First Street
- Engine 2, 1350 Lanes Mills Road
- Engine 3; 976 New Hampshire Avenue
- Ladder 3, Engine 33; 170 Lafayette Boulevard
- Engine 4, Engine 44; 300 River Avenue
- Engine 5 735 Cedar Bridge Avenue (Career)
- Ladder 5 800 Monmouth Avenue (Career)
- Support Services & RAC Unit (Rehab) 733 Cedar Bridge Avenue

==== EMS ====
Lakewood Township is served by four emergency medical services (EMS) entities, which include Lakewood EMS (LEMS), Lakewood First Aid & Emergency Squad (LFAS), Hatzolah EMS and Hatzulas Nefashos. The squads are all independently operated, but work together to provide emergency medical services for the township. Lakewood First Aid & Emergency Squad, Hatzolah EMS and Hatzulas Nefashos are volunteer organizations, while Lakewood EMS is a career municipal service under the direction of EMS Chief Crystal Van de Zilver. In the event of a motor vehicle accident, Lakewood First Aid & Emergency Squad are the primary providers of vehicle extrication services for the township and Hatzolah EMS serves as backup.

The three organizations collectively have approximately 150 volunteer and paid EMTs. Hatzolah also has a paramedic unit by special arrangement with RWJBarnabas Health.

- Lakewood First Aid & Emergency Squad – Squad 25 – 1555 Pine Street
- Hatzolah EMS – Squad 45 – Monmouth Avenue and 3rd Street, 501 West County Line Road at Heathwood Avenue

EMS Department

- Lakewood EMS – Squad 52 – 1555 Pine Street

=== Federal, state, and county representation ===
Lakewood Township is located in the 4th Congressional District, and is part of New Jersey's 30th state legislative district.

For the 119th United States Congress, New Jersey's 4th congressional district is represented by Chris Smith (R, Manchester Township). New Jersey is represented in the United States Senate by Democrats Cory Booker (Newark, term ends 2027) and Andy Kim (Moorestown, term ends 2031).

For the 2026–2027 session, the 30th legislative district of the New Jersey Legislature is represented in the State Senate by Robert Singer (R, Lakewood Township) and in the General Assembly by Sean T. Kean (R, Wall Township) and Avi Schnall (D, Lakewood Township).

Ocean County is governed by a Board of County Commissioners composed of five members who are elected on an at-large basis in partisan elections and serving staggered three-year terms of office, with either one or two seats coming up for election each year as part of the November general election. At an annual reorganization held in the beginning of January, the board chooses a director and a deputy director from among its members. As of 2025, Ocean County's Commissioners (with party affiliation, term-end year and residence) are:

John P. Kelly (R, 2025, Eagleswood Township), Virginia E. Haines (R, 2025, Toms River), Robert Arace (R, Manchester Township, 2027) Jennifer Bacchione (R, Berkeley Township, 2027) and Frank Sadeghi (R, 2026, Toms River).

Constitutional officers elected on a countywide basis are: Clerk Scott M. Colabella (R, 2025, Barnegat Light), Sheriff Michael G. Mastronardy (R, 2025; Toms River) and Surrogate Jeffrey Moran (R, 2028, Beachwood).

=== Politics ===
Presidential Elections Results
Year	Republican	Democratic	Third Parties
2024	88.0% 36,904	11.6% 4,860	0.5% 192
2020	82.5% 30,648	17.2% 6,397	0.3% 117
2016	74.4% 17,914	24.2% 5,841	1.4% 333
2012	72.9% 19,273	26.7% 7,062	0.3% 87
2008	69.1% 19,173	29.7% 8,242	0.5% 144
2004	66.4% 16,045	32.5% 7,852	0.4% 137

As of March 2011, there were a total of 37,925 registered voters in Lakewood Township, of which 6,417 (16.9%) were registered as Democrats, 13,287 (35.0%) were registered as Republicans, and 18,202 (48.0%) were registered as Unaffiliated. There were 19 voters registered to other parties. Among the township's 2010 Census population, 40.8% (vs. 63.2% in Ocean County) were registered to vote, including 70.2% of those ages 18 and over (vs. 82.6% countywide). The Vaad in Lakewood is an 11-member council of elders from the Orthodox community, which greatly influences the way the community will vote, often after interviewing political candidates.

Gubernatorial election results for Lakewood Township
Year	Republican		Democratic		Third party(ies)	
Year	No.	%	No.	%	No.	%
2025	36,803	90.34%	3,900	9.57%	37	0.09%
2021	12,505	61.38%	7,820	38.38%	48	0.24%
2017	5,616	48.85%	5,704	49.62%	176	1.53%
2013	11,850	82.38%	2,427	16.87%	107	0.74%
2009	10,528	61.62%	5,910	34.59%	648	3.79%
2005	6,533	43.51%	8,098	53.93%	385	2.56%

In the 2013 gubernatorial election, Republican Chris Christie received 82.4% of the vote (11,850 cast), ahead of Democrat Barbara Buono with 16.9% (2,427 votes), and other candidates with 0.7% (107 votes), among the 14,921 ballots cast by the township's 41,567 registered voters (537 ballots were spoiled), for a turnout of 35.9%. In the 2009 gubernatorial election, Republican Chris Christie received 54.9% of the vote (10,528 ballots cast), ahead of Democrat Jon Corzine with 30.8% (5,910 votes), Independent Chris Daggett with 2.6% (506 votes) and other candidates with 0.7% (142 votes), among the 19,171 ballots cast by the township's 37,928 registered voters, yielding a 50.5% turnout.

United States Senate election results for Lakewood Township1
Year	Republican		Democratic		Third party(ies)	
Year	No.	%	No.	%	No.	%
2024	25,122	79.45%	6,260	19.80%	237	0.75%
2018	10,848	58.17%	7,509	40.26%	292	1.57%
2012	13,154	55.16%	10,539	44.19%	155	0.65%
2006	7,876	54.28%	6,414	44.20%	221	1.52%

United States Senate election results for Lakewood Township2
Year	Republican		Democratic		Third party(ies)	
Year	No.	%	No.	%	No.	%
2020	26,893	79.64%	6,686	19.80%	188	0.56%
2014	7,511	56.12%	5,769	43.11%	103	0.77%
2013	8,770	73.80%	3,058	25.73%	56	0.47%
2008	16,345	63.86%	8,981	35.09%	268	1.05%

== Transportation ==
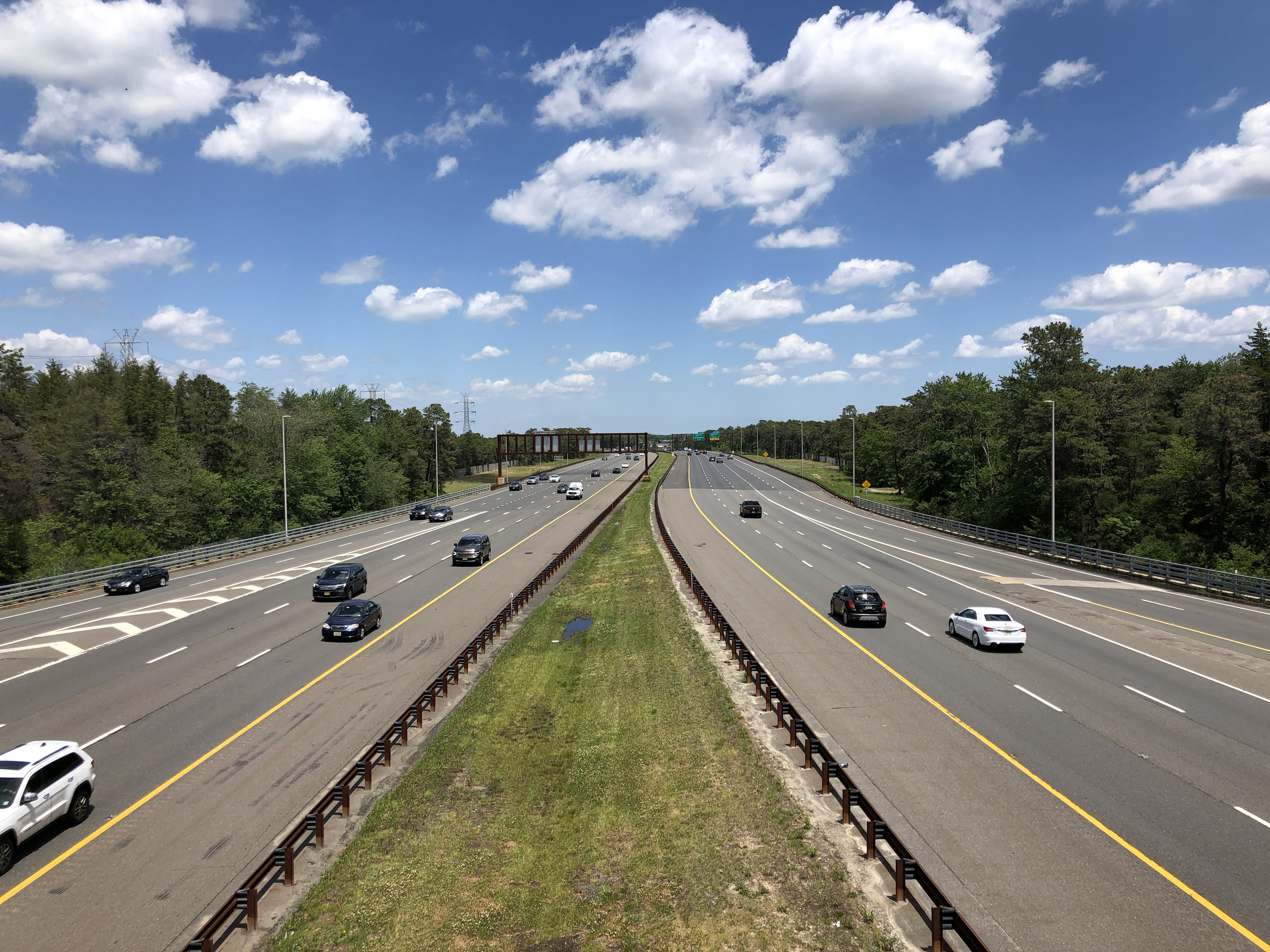
The northbound Garden State Parkway at CR 528 in Lakewood

=== Roads and highways ===
As of May 2010, the township had a total of 193.15 miles (310.84 km) of roadways; of which 135.26 miles (217.68 km) were maintained by the municipality, 43.28 miles (69.65 km) by Ocean County, 11.22 miles (18.06 km) by the New Jersey Department of Transportation, and 3.39 miles (5.46 km) by the New Jersey Turnpike Authority.

The Garden State Parkway is the most prominent highway in Lakewood. It passes through the eastern part of the municipality, connecting Toms River in the south to Brick in the north with one major interchange serving Lakewood at exit 89. Drivers can access Route 70 from exit 89, after exit 88 was permanently closed in November 2014. The state and U.S. routes that pass through are Route 70, Route 88 and Route 9. Major county routes that pass through are CR 526, CR 528, CR 547 and CR 549.

=== Public transportation ===
The Lakewood Bus Terminal is a regional transit hub. NJ Transit provides bus service on the 137 and 139 routes to and from the Port Authority Bus Terminal in New York City, to Philadelphia on the 317 route, to Newark on the 67 and to Atlantic City on the 559.

The Lakewood Shuttle is a bus with two routes: one in town, and one in Industrial Park.

Ocean Ride local service is provided on the OC3 Brick / Lakewood / Toms River and OC4 Lakewood – Brick Link routes.

Lakewood Airport is a public-use airport located 3 miles (4.8 km) southeast of the township's central business district. The airport is publicly owned.

The Monmouth Ocean Middlesex Line is a passenger rail project proposed by NJ Transit Rail Operations to serve the Central New Jersey counties of Monmouth, Ocean and Middlesex which would serve Lakewood.

== Notable people ==
People who were born in, residents of, or otherwise closely associated with Lakewood Township include:

- Yitzchak Abadi (1933–2025), rabbi and posek
- Morton I. Abramowitz (1933–2024), diplomat
- Val Ackerman (born 1959), first president of the Women's National Basketball Association
- Jay Alders (class of 1996), fine artist, photographer and graphic designer, best known for his original surf art paintings
- Joe Baum (1920–1998), restaurateur
- Spider Bennett (born 1943), professional basketball player in the ABA with the Dallas Chaparrals and Houston Mavericks
- Tyrice Beverette (born 1995), professional Canadian football linebacker for the Montreal Alouettes of the Canadian Football League
- Yisroel Pinchos Bodner, rabbi and author of books on various topics of halakha
- Brandon Carter (born 1986), former offensive lineman for the Tampa Bay Buccaneers
- Haakon Chevalier (1901–1985), author, translator, and professor of French literature at the University of California, Berkeley, best known for his friendship with physicist J. Robert Oppenheimer
- Simcha Bunim Cohen, rabbi, posek and author
- Michael Cudlitz (born 1964), actor who has appeared in Southland and Band of Brothers
- Ngo Dinh Diem (1901–1963), first president of South Vietnam
- Marc Ecko (born 1972), founder and CEO of Eckō Unltd.
- Shimon Eider (1938–2007), rabbi, author on halakha and expert on the construction of eruvin
- Mendel Epstein, convicted leader of the New York divorce coercion gang
- Dick Estelle (born 1942), pitcher who played for the San Francisco Giants
- Mike Gesicki (born 1995), tight end who plays for the Cincinnati Bengals of the National Football League
- Hazel Gluck (born 1934), politician and lobbyist who served in the New Jersey General Assembly and held several posts in the cabinet of Governor Thomas Kean
- William Goldstein (born 1942), composer, recording artist, arts philosopher and improvisational pianist
- George Jay Gould I (1864–1923), financier and railroad executive, whose estate became Georgian Court University
- Virginia E. Haines (born 1946), politician who serves on the Ocean County Board of Chosen Freeholders and had served in the New Jersey General Assembly from 1992 to 1994 and as Executive Director of the New Jersey Lottery from 1994 to 2002
- Yehudah Jacobs (c. 1935–2020), mashgiach ruchani (spiritual guidance counselor) at Beth Medrash Govoha
- Serge Jaroff (1896–1985), conductor, composer and founder of the Don Cossack Chorus
- C.S. Eliot Kang (born 1962), diplomat and member of the Senior Executive Service
- Stan Kasten (born 1952), president and part-owner of the Los Angeles Dodgers, and former President of the Washington Nationals, Atlanta Braves, Atlanta Hawks and Atlanta Thrashers
- Shoshanna Keats Jaskoll (born 1975), activist and writer whose work focuses on women's rights in Orthodox Judaism and the visibility of women in Israel's Orthodox communities
- Edith Kingdon (1864–1921), actress wife of George Jay Gould I
- Aharon Kotler (1892–1962), founding rosh yeshiva (dean) of Beth Medrash Govoah and a pre-eminent authority on Torah among Haredi Jews
- Malkiel Kotler (born 1951), current rosh yeshiva of Beth Medrash Govoha
- Shneur Kotler (1918–1982), rosh yeshiva of Beth Medrash Govoha
- Cliff Kresge (born 1968), professional golfer
- Joseph Mayer (1877–1942), mayor of Belmar, New Jersey, who later served on the Ocean County Board of Chosen Freeholders
- Rich Medina (born 1969), DJ, producer, spoken word poet, archivist and journalist
- Sonia Handelman Meyer (1920–2022), photographer best known for her street photography as a member of the New York Photo League
- Purnell Mincy (1916–2003), Negro league baseball pitcher from 1938 to 1940
- Charles W. Morse (1856–1933), Wall Street speculator
- Loren Murchison (1898–1979), Olympic athlete who won gold medals in 1920 and 1924 in the 4x100m relay event
- Yisroel Neuman, (born 1947) rosh yeshiva of Beth Medrash Govoha
- Yerucham Olshin, rosh yeshiva of Beth Medrash Govoha
- Arthur Newton Pack (1893–1975), naturalist and writer who founded the American Nature Association and the periodical Nature Magazine
- Haydn Proctor (1903–1996), member of the New Jersey Senate
- Yosef Reinman (born 1947), rabbi and author who has written about inter-community dialogue within Judaism
- Richard Roberts (born 1957), pharmaceutical executive, philanthropist and political activist
- John D. Rockefeller (1839–1937), industrialist and philanthropist, had an estate in Lakewood, as well as other homes in Ohio, New York, and Florida. His family donated a large tract of land it owned in Lakewood to Ocean County, where the County built the current Ocean County Park on Route 88, Lakewood
- Matisyahu Salomon (1937–2024), mashgiach ruchani of Gateshead Talmudical College and of Beth Medrash Govoha
- Eliezer Schindler (1892–1957), writer, poet, activist and missionary
- Robert Schmertz (1926–1975), founder and CEO of Leisure Technology Corp. and former owner of the Portland Trail Blazers and Boston Celtics
- Dovid Schustal (born 1947), rosh yeshiva of Beth Medrash Govoha
- Art Seitz (1942–2025), sports photographer who specialized in tennis
- Armin Shimerman (born 1949), actor, best known for playing the Ferengi bartender Quark in the television series Star Trek: Deep Space Nine and voicing General Skarr in the animated series Grim & Evil
- Betsy Sholl (born 1945), poet who was poet laureate of Maine from 2006 to 2011
- Arthur Siegel (1923–1994), songwriter
- Robert Singer (born 1947), member of the New Jersey Senate and former Mayor of Lakewood Township
- Sarri Singer, activist who founded and directs Strength to Strength, an organization that supports survivors of terrorist attacks
- J. R. Smith (born 1985), former basketball player in the NBA and in the Chinese Basketball Association
- Lew Soloff (1944–2015), jazz trumpeter
- Eli Stefansky, rabbi known for popular daf yomi shiur
- Yisroel Taplin, author of The Date Line in Halacha
- Penina Taylor, counter-missionary speaker
- Steve Tisch (born 1948), film producer and chairman of the New York Giants
- Harry Lancaster Towe (1898–1991), politician who represented New Jersey's 9th congressional district in the United States House of Representatives from 1943 to 1951
- Marc Turtletaub (born 1946), CEO of The Money Store and film producer and director
- Jake Turx (born 1986), senior White House correspondent and chief political correspondent for Ami magazine
- Charles Waterhouse (1924–2013), artist
- Mookie Wilson (born 1956), baseball player, most notably with the New York Mets

== Sister cities ==
- Bnei Brak, Israel, since 2011

== See also ==
- Jewish population by city

== General and cited references ==
- Axel-Lute, Paul. Lakewood-in-the-Pines: A History of Lakewood, New Jersey, self-published, 1986 (South Orange, NJ)
