= Yeshiva Gedola of Carteret =

Jewish institution in Carteret, New Jersey

Coordinates: 40.5811°N 74.2219°W

Yeshiva Gedola and Mesivta of Carteret
- Type: Yeshiva (Orthodox)
- Established: 2006
- Location: 42 Noe St, Carteret, New Jersey, US
- Campus: Urban

Yeshiva Gedola and Mesivta of Carteret (Hebrew: ישיבה תפארת יהודה אריה) informally, "YGOC", also called Yeshiva Tiferes Yehuda Aryeh, is a yeshiva and non-profit organization located in Carteret in Middlesex County, New Jersey, United States.

== History ==
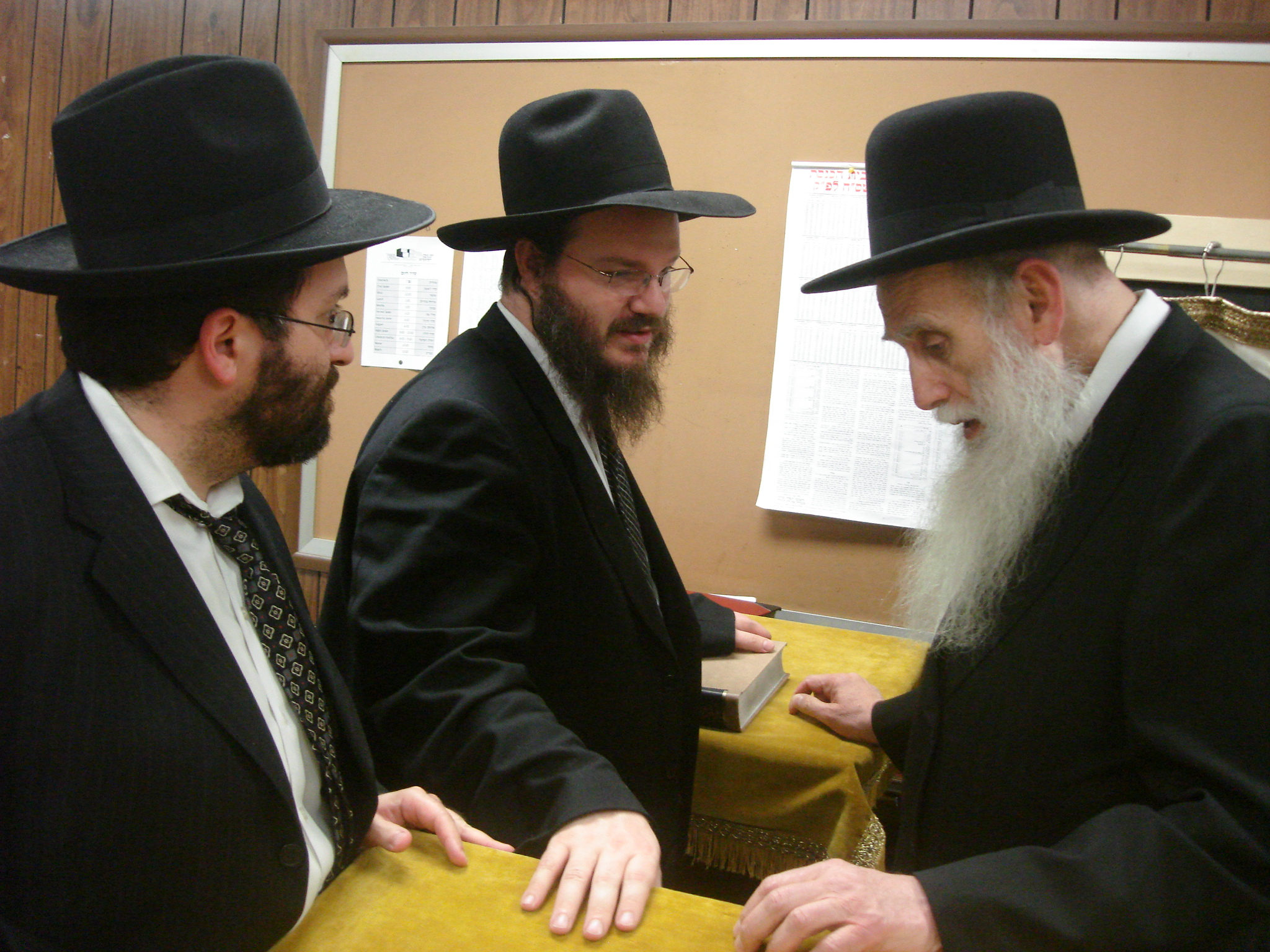
(L-R) Rabbi Yaakov Mayer and Rabbi Azriel Brown with Rabbi Aharon Feldman in 2006

The yeshiva was founded in 2006 by Rabbi Azriel Brown and Rabbi Yaakov Mayer, both graduates of the Mir yeshiva in Jerusalem, and Yeshivas Ner Yisroel of Baltimore, talmidim of Rabbi Shmuel Yaakov Weinberg the son-in-law of Rabbi Yaakov Yitzchok Ruderman, and Rabbi Yaakov Moshe Kulefsky, a very close Student of Reb Shlomo Heiman.

With the backing of Rabbi Aharon Feldman, Rabbi Shmuel Kamenetzky, and Rabbi Yaakov Perlow, among numerous others, Rabbis Brown and Mayer decided to open a yeshiva in the suburban north Jersey town of Carteret. Carteret had previously boasted a Jewish community with two synagogues in the 1950s but its Jewish presence had dwindled since then, to the point that it was no longer able to support the remaining synagogue, a Jewish community center, which closed in 2002. Garson Gruhin and Lou Raiman, remaining board members of the Jewish community center, worked hard to preserve Jewish life in Carteret. Garson Gruhin along with his son Mark I. Gruhin, Esq., arranged to transfer the former synagogue and community center building and an adjoining five-bedroom rabbi's residence to the yeshiva.

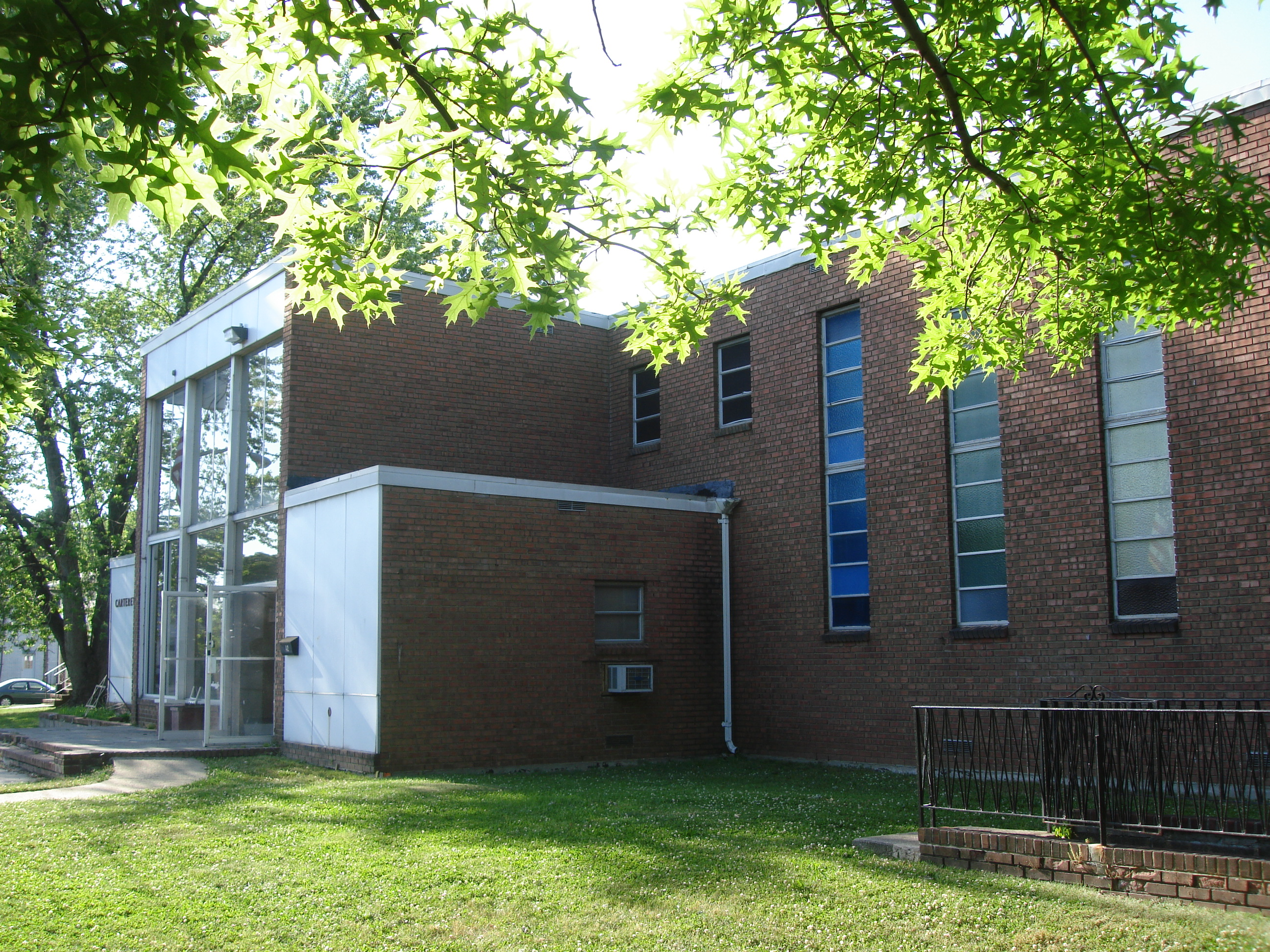
Exterior view of the main building – formerly a Jewish community center

The yeshiva opened in September 2006, starting with a small group of 14 students. Initially, Donya Brown and Chani Mayer, wives of the founders, handled the food preparation and bookkeeping for the fledgling institution, and each family hosted all the students in their home for one Shabbos meal. As enrollment grew and the students began staying in the Yeshiva full-time, the Browns and Mayers took an active role in each student's education, and personal growth, helped them with shidduchim (marriage proposals), and even hosted their sheva brachos (festive meals held during the week after the wedding).

In 2015, Rabbi Yaakov T. Biderman became the executive director of the yeshiva. Biderman is an alumnus of the Yeshiva, who was intimately involved in its operations as a student and remained involved throughout the years in between. He also founded the Alumni Association in August 2013, with the help of Alumnus Zecharya Michelsohn. Rabbi Biderman transitioned to the Executive Board in 2024.

In 2017, a Mesivta was added. Rabbi Avraham Yeshaya Roth, who was Rebbi in the Yeshiva for several years prior, was appointed The Rosh Mesivta.

In 2024, Rabbi Chaim Tzvi Brog became the executive director of the yeshiva.

=== Program ===
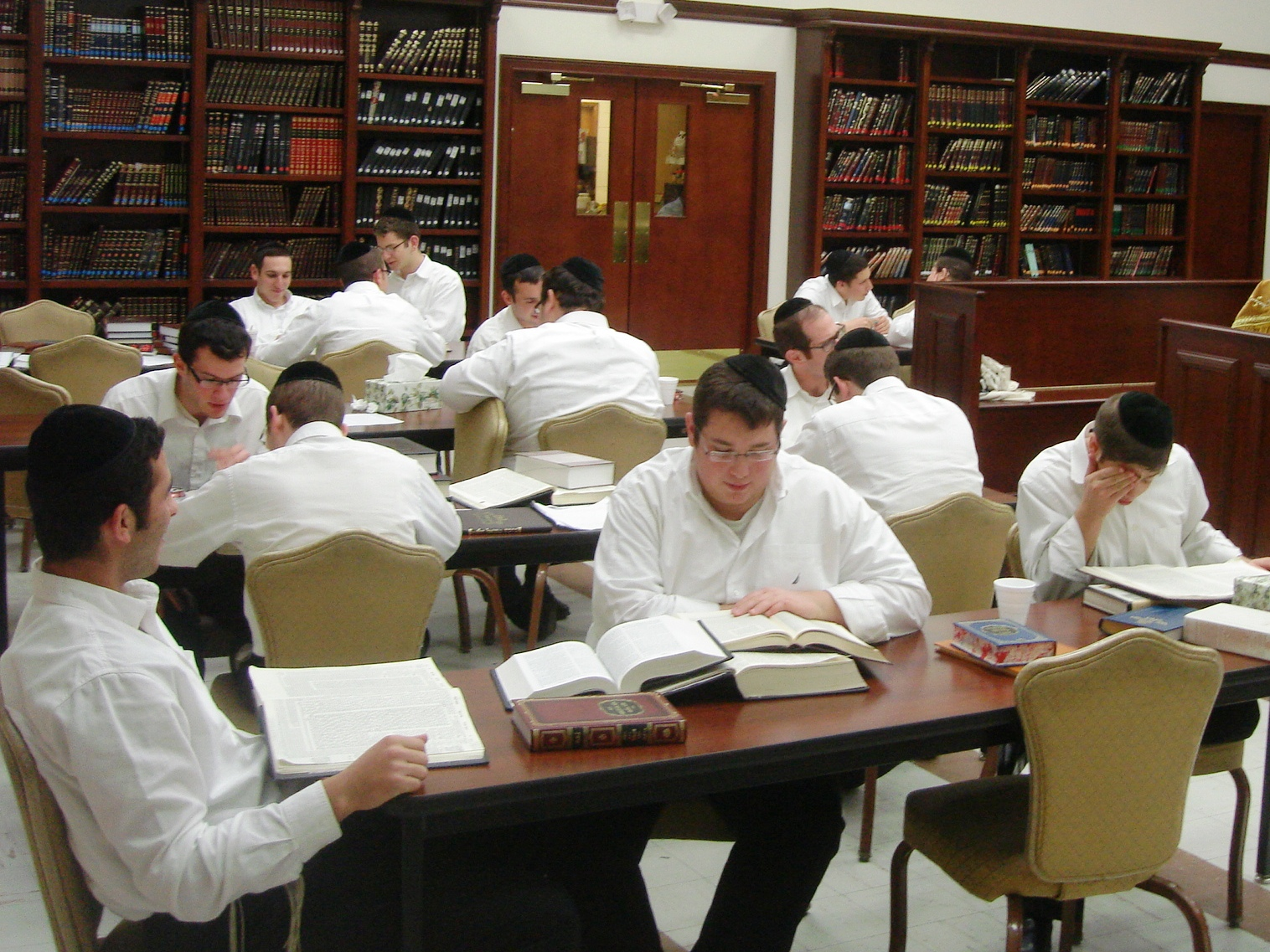
Partial view of the beis medrash (study hall) during seder in 2011

The yeshiva is an all-male Lithuanian (Litvish)-style Talmudic college. Currently, it consists of a mesivta (high school) program.

== Curriculum ==
The Mesivta's studies are broken into two portions. The first half of the day is focused on Talmudic texts and rabbinic literature, mussar (Jewish ethical literature) and practical halacha (Jewish law). The afternoon is focused on general studies, including math, history, science, language arts, computers, business economics, public speaking and more. The evening is once again focused on Talmudic texts and rabbinic literature, mussar (Jewish ethical literature) and practical halacha (Jewish law).

== Leadership ==
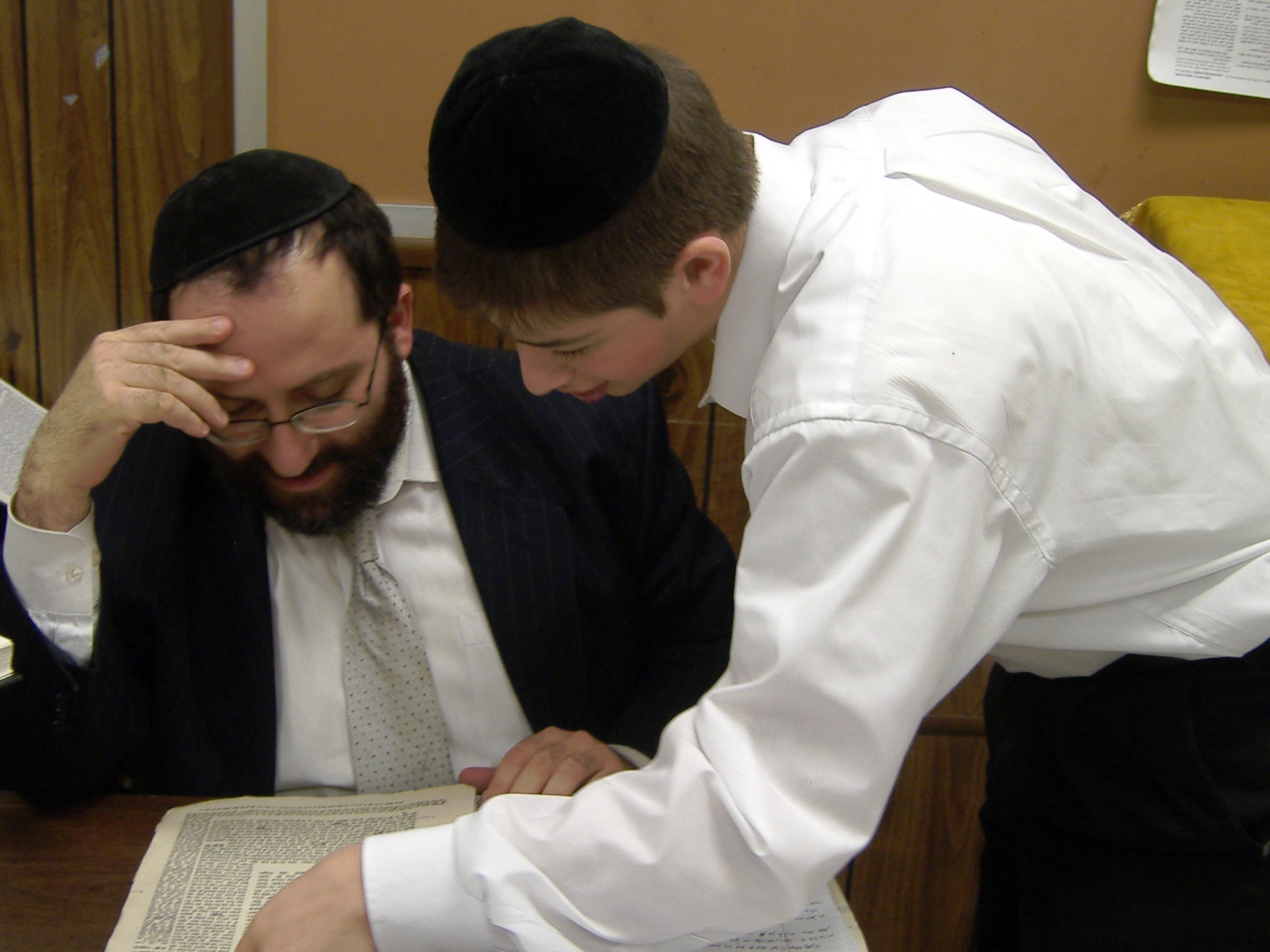
Rabbi Mayer answering a student's question

- Rabbi Yaakov B. Mayer, Rosh Yeshiva
- Rabbi Azriel Brown, Rosh Yeshiva
- Rabbi Chaim Tzvi Brog, Executive Director
- Rabbi Heshy (Yisroel Tzvi) Fireworker, Mashgiach Ruchani
- Rabbi Avraham Yeshaya Roth, Rosh mesivta
- Rabbi Eliyahu D. Teitz, General Studies Principal

=== Azriel Brown ===
Rabbi Azriel Brown
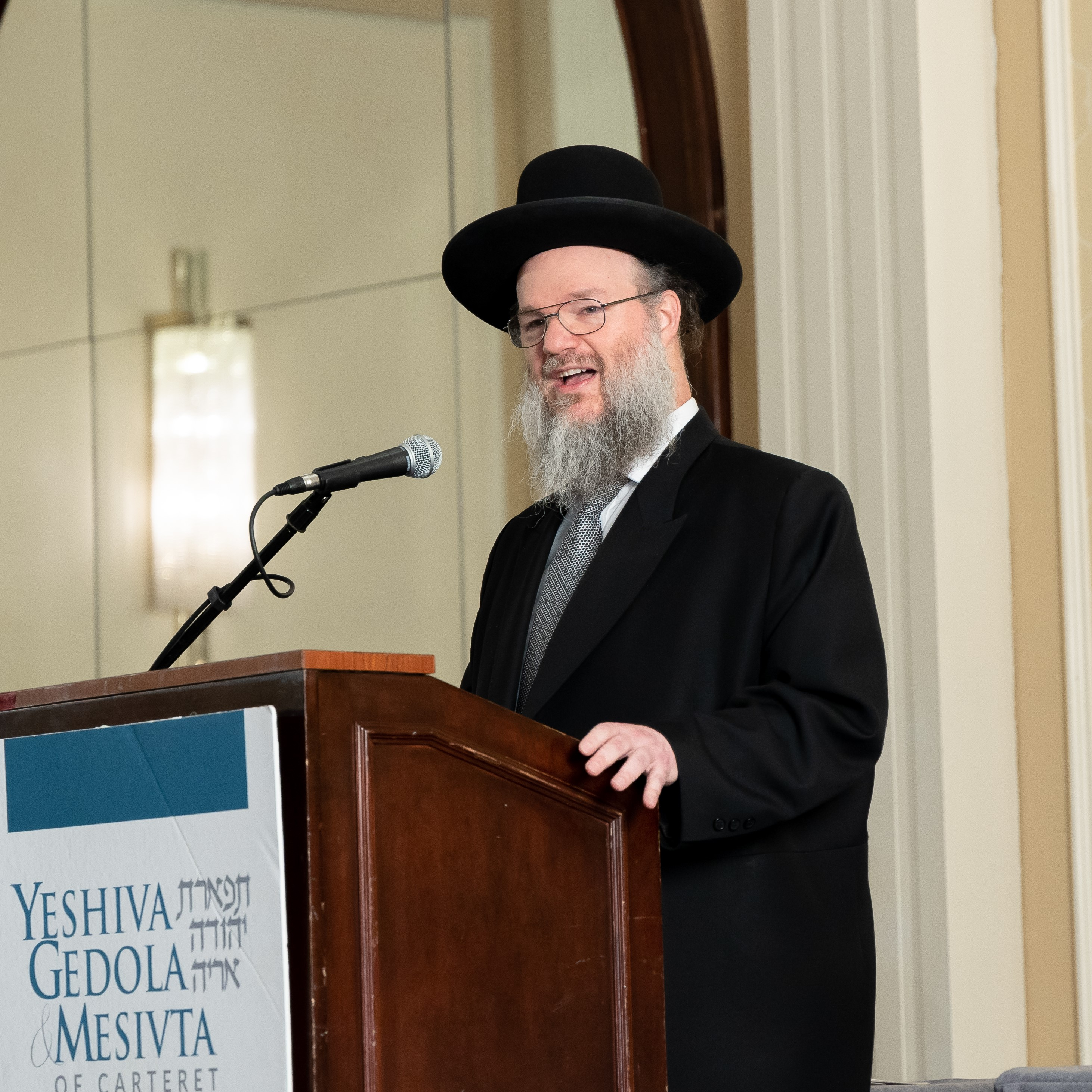
- Brown in 2023
- Title: Rabbi

Personal life
- Born: Azriel Brown
- Spouse: Donya Trenk Brown
- Parent(s): Moshe Brown and Leah Weinberg Brown

Religious life
- Religion: Judaism

Jewish leader
- Position: Rosh Yeshiva
- Yeshiva: Yeshiva Gedola of Carteret
- Residence: Carteret, New Jersey
- Semikhah: Ner Israel

Azriel Brown (Hebrew: עזריאל בראון) (born August 1972) is an Orthodox Jewish Rabbi and Rosh Yeshiva of the Yeshiva Gedola of Carteret. He is the oldest son of Rabbi Moshe Brown, a prominent Rabbi in Far Rockaway and the 5 Towns, New York, and a Maggid Shiur at Yeshiva of Far Rockaway.

Rabbi Brown studied at Yeshiva Darchei Torah (Far Rockaway), Yeshiva of Far Rockaway, Mir Yeshiva (Jerusalem), and Ner Israel, where he received a PhD in Talmudic Law. Brown has mastered the Talmud and completed it at least 12 times.

Rabbi Brown has written numerous works in Hebrew on various subjects within Torah literature.

- ספר עוז והילול on Hallel
- ספר עוז לעמו on Jewish History
- ספר עדות לאברהם on Mesches Nedorim
- ספר עבודה בים on Safek Doraisa L'Chumra
- קונטרס עוז לתורה on Three Mesoras HaTorah

He also authored a portion of "Introduction to the Talmud" by Artscroll Mesorah Publications, as well as contributed to numerous other of their works.

== Rabbinical Advisory Board ==
- Harav Shmuel Kamenetsky
- Harav Reuven Feinstein
- Harav Aharon Feldman
- Harav Eliyahu (Elya) Brudny

== Executive Board ==
- Rabbi Avrohom Biderman
- Rabbi Yaakov T. Biderman
- Mr. Nachum Futersak
- Dr. Alan Goldsmith
- Mr. Leon Mayer
- Mr. Shlomo Mayer
- Rabbi Dovid Merkin
- Rabbi Naftali Miller

== Hachnasas Sifrei Torah ==
In December 2008, the yeshiva celebrated a Hachnasas Sefer Torah, the traditional festivity upon the completion of a new Torah scroll. Several hundred guests came to Carteret for the procession, including several eminent Torah figures. Noe Street was barricaded off to outside traffic as the crowd wound its way to the yeshiva building accompanied by live music and dancing.

In September 2011, the yeshiva held a kesivas osios (Torah scroll-writing ceremony) in Lakewood for another new Torah scroll, that was to be dedicated after Sukkos 2011. The Hachnosas Sefer Torah took place in Carteret.

== Hurricane Sandy ==
In October 2012 the yeshiva building experienced substantial damage from Hurricane Sandy. The flooding reached nearly 2 feet (0.61 m) above the main floor, as well as damaged dormitory houses. One dormitory, hit by the flood and by an explosion from a neighboring building, was condemned by the township. Total damage was estimated at close to $200,000. The Yeshiva was ineligible for FEMA assistance, due to the exclusion of religious institutions at the time. This set back the Yeshiva tremendously.

== Hurricane Ida and fire ==
In September 2021, the Yeshiva suffered massive amounts of damage from Hurricane Ida. Later the same school year (early summer 2022), the Yeshiva had a fire.
