= Sandek =

Role in the Jewish circumcision ceremony

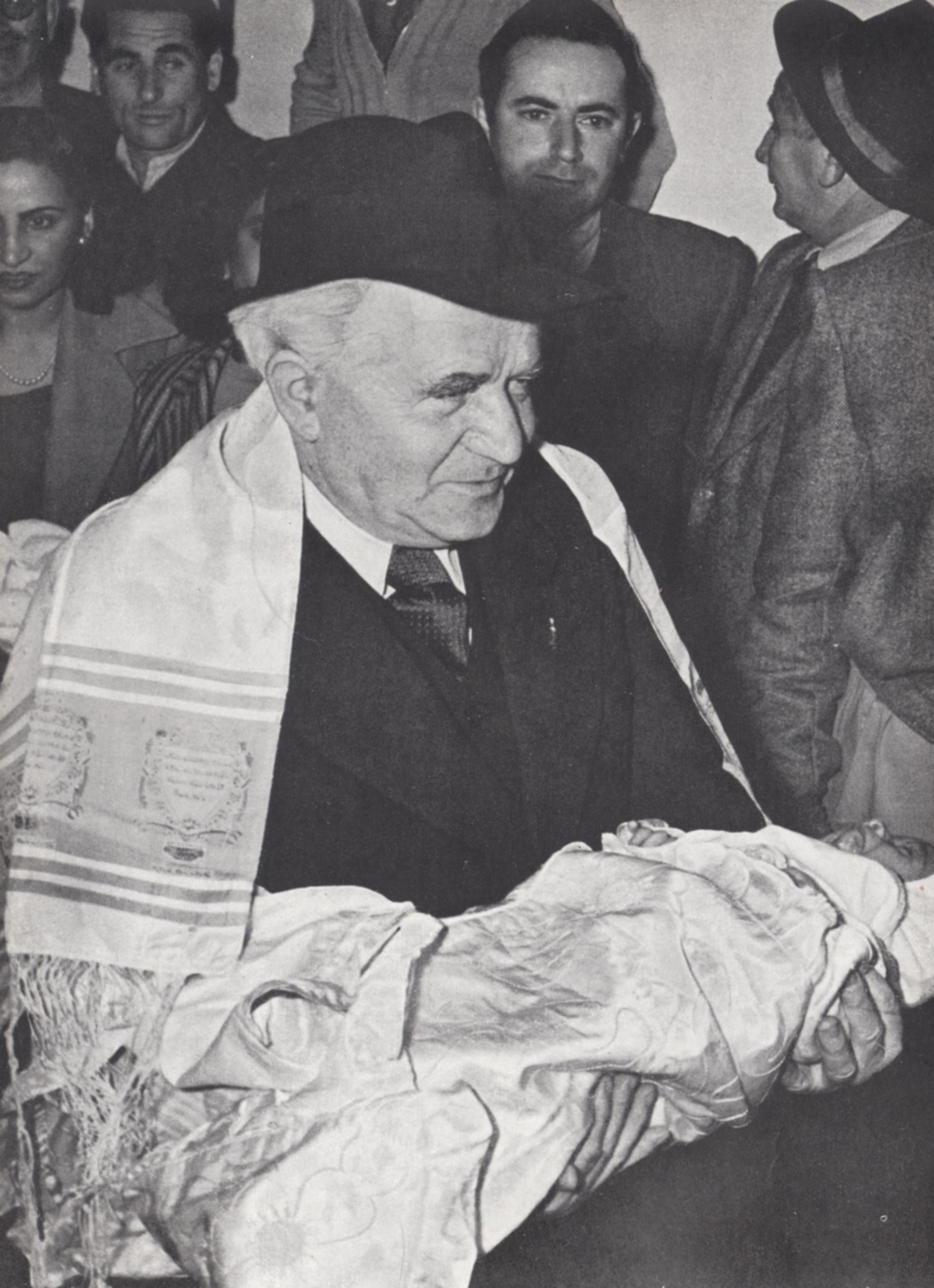
David Ben-Gurion, the first Prime Minister of Israel, honored with godparents in circumcision

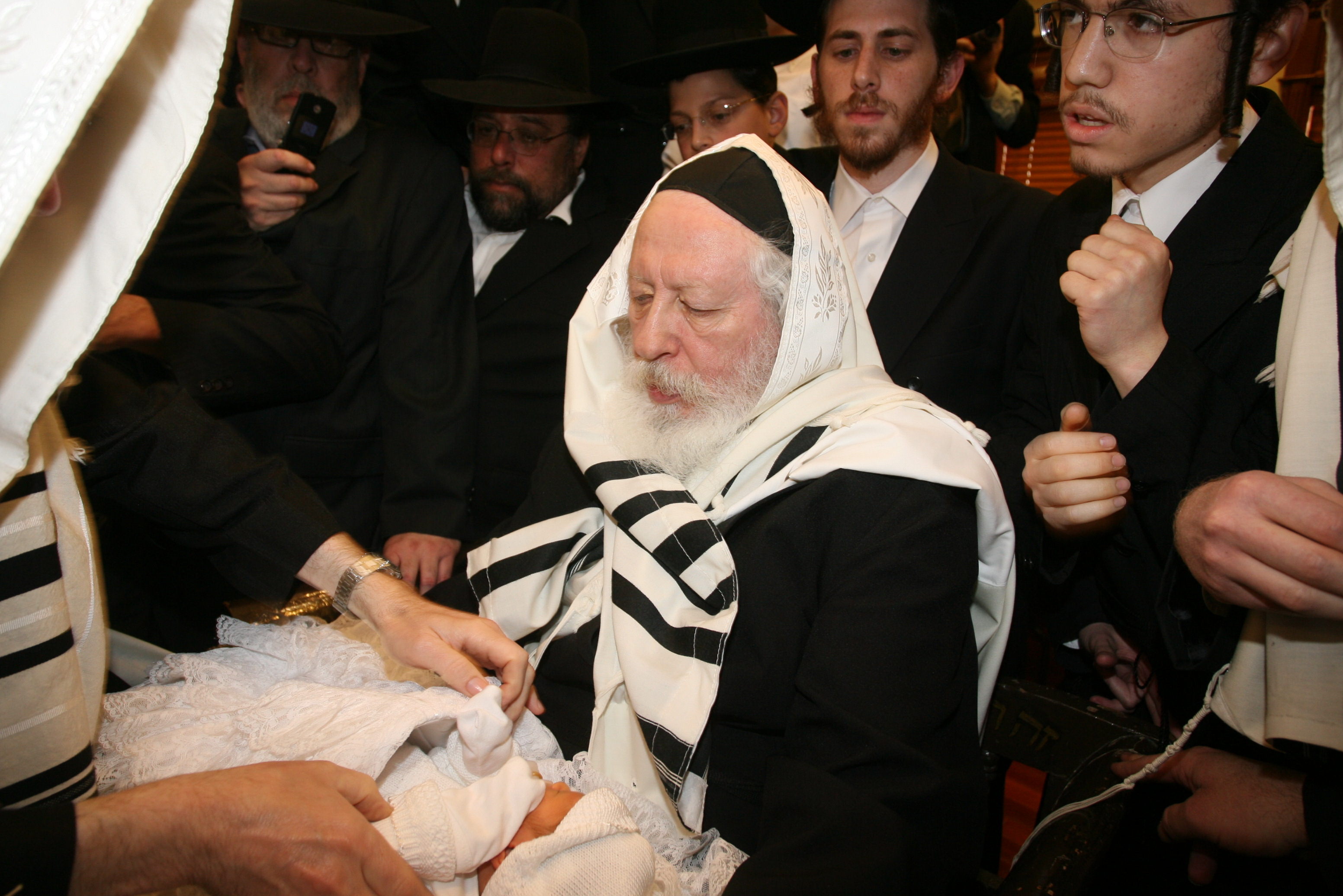
Rabbi Yaakov Aryeh Alter (the seventh Rebbe of Gur Hassidism) is honored as a Sandek.

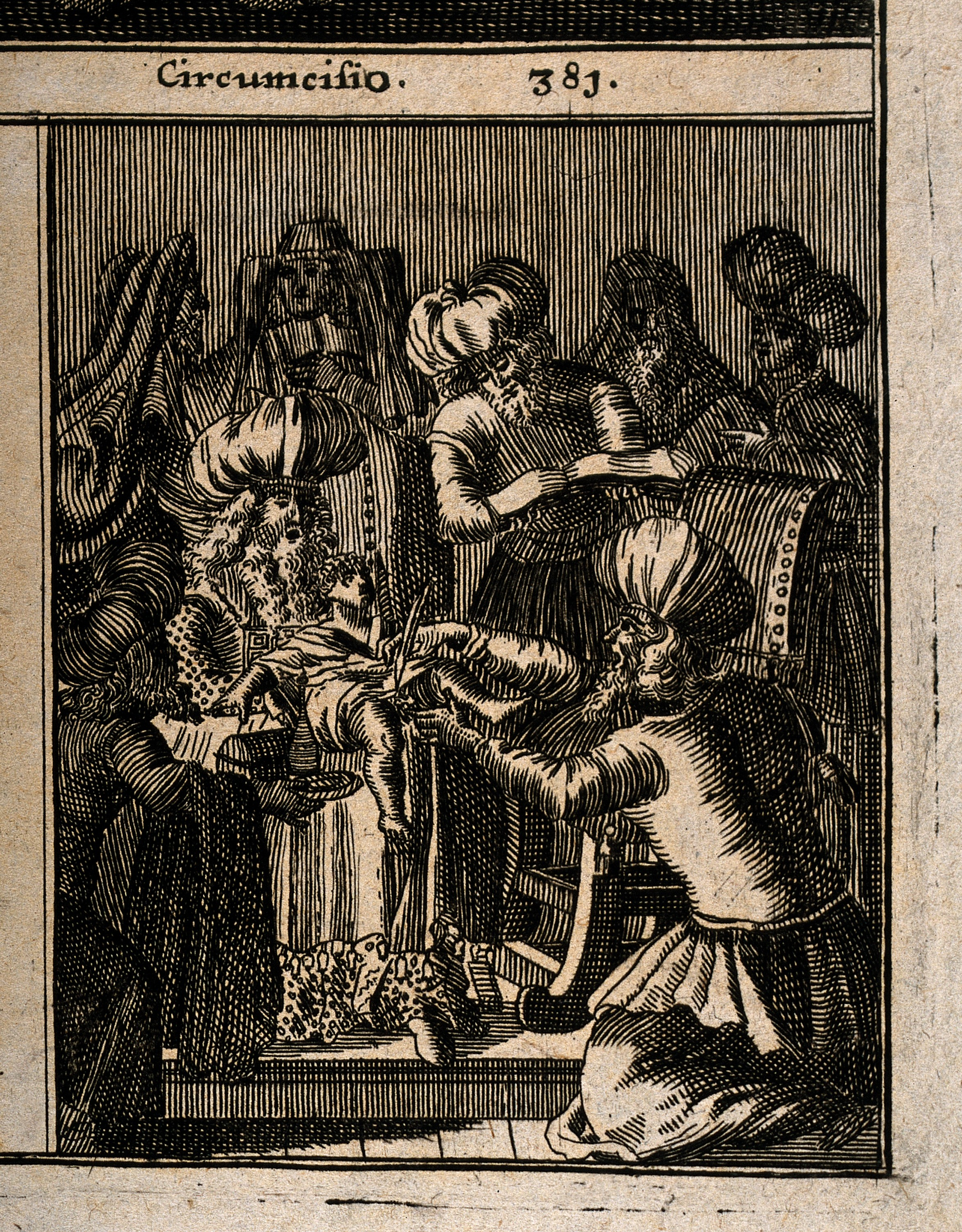
An ancient illustration of circumcision

A sandek or sandak (Hebrew: סנדק "companion of child", from Koine Greek: σύντεκνος) is a person honored at a brit milah in Judaism, traditionally either by holding the baby boy on the knees or thighs when the mohel performs the circumcision or by handing the baby to the mohel.

In Modern Hebrew, sandak is also the word for godfather; the film The Godfather is known in Hebrew as HaSandak. The role is distinct from that of the kvater, a Yiddish term for the person who carries the baby in Ashkenazi ceremonies.

== Etymology ==
The origin of the term has been attributed to a derivation from the Greek sunteknos (syn-, meaning "plus", and tekno, meaning "child"), which means "companion of child". Alternatively, it may be derived from Greek σύνδικος (Latin, "syndicus"), in the sense of "representative," "patron," "advocate."

== History ==
A number of references in midrashim and other early rabbinical works testify to the existence of the sandek in the Talmudic age. In medieval rabbinical literature the references to the office are numerous, and it appears to have been well established and highly esteemed. Thus the "Haggahot Maimuniyyot" mentions that many "covet and eagerly desire to hold the child upon their knees as it is circumcised."

In medieval times the sandek was known by many other names as well, including "ba'al berit" (master of the covenant), "ba'al berit ha-milah" (master of the covenant of circumcision), "tofes ha-yeled" (holder of the child), "av sheni" (second father), and "shaliach" (messenger). The office was surrounded with marks of honor. A special seat, usually richly decorated, was prepared in the synagogue for the sandik, and if the circumcision happened on a day of Torah reading, he was entitled to receive an aliyah. The privilege was reserved for persons of standing and of good moral and religious character. It was restricted also in other ways. Rabbinical authorities (for instance, Rabbenu Peretz and Judah the Hasid) decreed that the privilege should not be given more than once to the same man in the same family, neither should it, unless unavoidable, be given to women. This latter prohibition was based on motives of delicacy. Women were, however, permitted to participate indirectly in the privilege as associates to the sandek. They carried the child to the entrance of the synagogue or to the room in which the circumcision was about to take place, where it was taken by the sandek.

== Customs ==
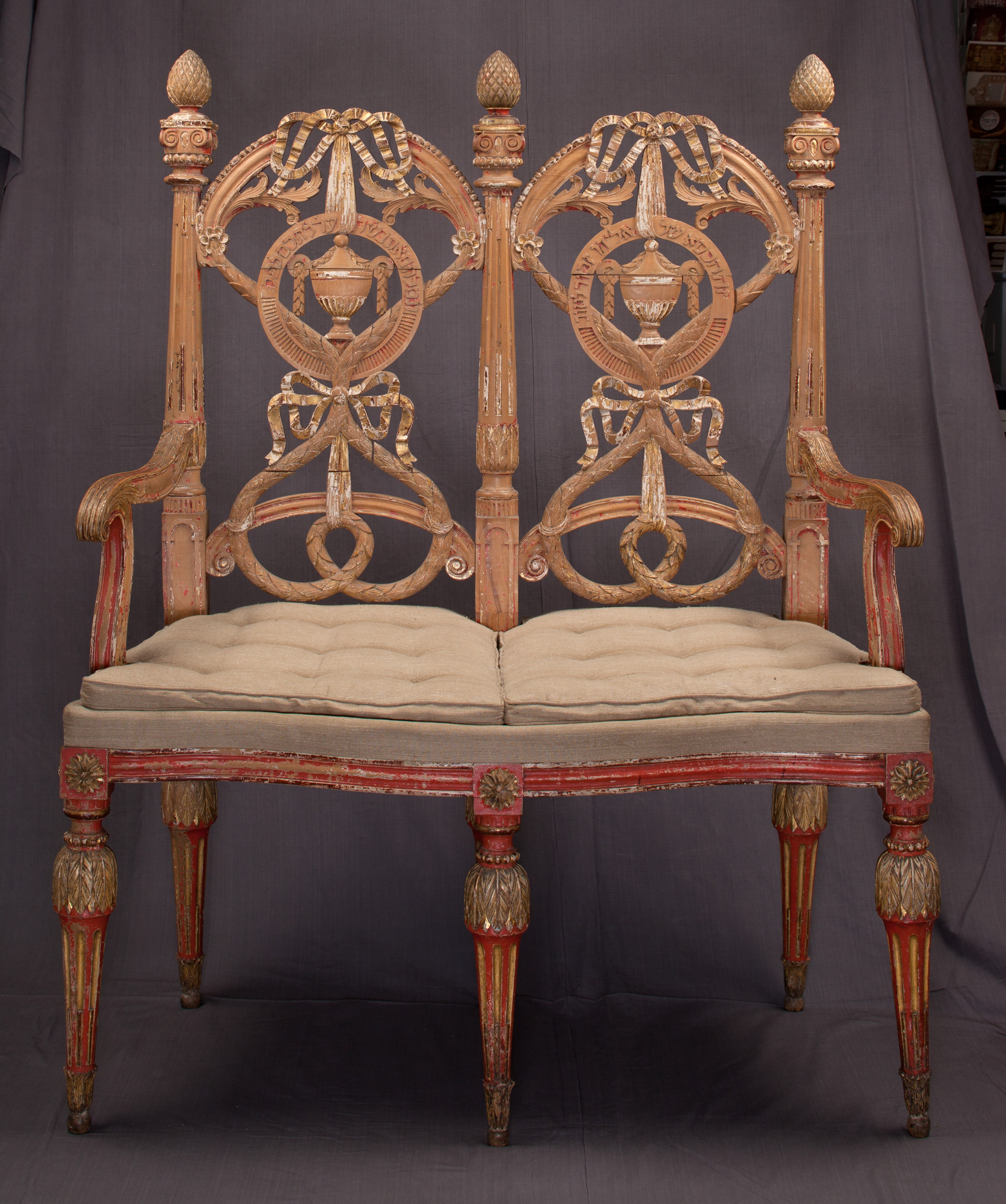
Circumcision bench, 18th century. The sandek sits on the left, and the seat on the right is reserved for the prophet Elijah. In the collection of the Jewish Museum of Switzerland.

Moses Isserles (d. 1572) recorded the practice of the sandek holding the baby on his thighs. The Vilna Gaon cites Midrash Tehillim, explaining that this is based on Psalms 35:10, which states, "All my bones shall say: 'YHWH, who is like you?'"; the midrash outlines how every body part is used in the service of God, and says that the sandek's thighs participate in the service of God by placing the baby on them during the brit.

The Rema records a custom that a father should not honor the same individual twice by being the sandek for his children. The reason is that the sandek is compared to a kohen (priest) offering the incense offering in the Temple in Jerusalem. The procedure regarding the incense is that a kohen does not perform this mitzva more than once in his lifetime: as God is presumed to reward with wealth the kohen who offers the incense, as many kohanim as possible are allowed to become wealthy. Similarly, the opportunity is afforded to as many people as possible to serve as a sandek and receive God's blessing to become wealthy.

The Vilna Gaon expresses some skepticism regarding this custom. First, based on its reasoning, the custom should have been that one should not serve more than once as a sandek for any child, not just two children of one family. Second, the Vilna Gaon writes that no one has become wealthy because he served as a sandek. Nevertheless, the Aruch HaShulchan concludes that the custom recorded by Isserlies should be observed. The Aruch Hashulchan notes, though, that the custom in many locales is that the rav (rabbi) of the city serves as the sandek for all the baby boys. The Aruch Hashulchan justifies this practice by comparing the local rav to the High Priest of Israel, who had the right to offer a korban (sacrifice) or incense any time he desired. Indeed, it is related that Avrohom Yeshaya Karelitz served as the sandek for innumerable baby boys. Yissocher Frand relates that Yaakov Yitzchak Ruderman, rosh yeshiva (dean) of Yeshivas Ner Yisroel, also served as the sandek for countless baby boys.

The honor was given traditionally to one Jewish male: some older family member (grandfather, great-grandfather), a rabbi, or another important male who was observant and righteous. The sandek also wore the tallit (prayer shawl) and held the baby on a pillow while the mohel completed the circumcision. In modern times, a sandek may be female or even non-Jewish. At most ceremonies, there is only a single sandek, but two are permissible, although more than two is uncommon.

During the brit, a chair is sometimes placed next to the sandek's seat. The chair is reserved for the prophet Elijah, and remains unoccupied during the ceremony; this practice is derived from the tradition that Elijah protects children from danger. According to some sources, the sandek is the "representative" of Elijah.
