= Yeshivas Ner Yisroel =

Yeshiva in Pikesville, Maryland, US

Ner Israel Rabbinical College
- Motto: Building Greatness One Talmid at a Time
- Established: 1933; 93 years ago
- Founder: Yaakov Yitzchok Ruderman
- Religious affiliation: Orthodox Judaism
- Chairman: Aharon Feldman
- President: Boruch Neuberger
- Principal: Beryl Weisbord
- Location: Pikesville, Maryland, United States; 39°23′18″N 76°45′17″W
- Campus: Rural, 100 acres (40 ha)
- Website: nirc.edu

Ner Israel Rabbinical College (Hebrew: ישיבת נר ישראל), also known as NIRC and Ner Yisroel, is a Haredi Jewish yeshiva (Jewish educational institution) in Pikesville, Maryland. It was founded in 1933 by Rabbi Yaakov Yitzchok Ruderman, a disciple of Rabbi Nosson Tzvi Finkel (a.k.a. the Alter of Slabodka), dean of the Slabodka yeshiva in Lithuania. Rabbi Aharon Feldman, a disciple of Rabbi Ruderman and a member of the Moetzes Gedolei HaTorah of America, became its head in 2001.

The yeshiva is an all-male Lithuanian (Litvish)-style Talmudic academy and is politically affiliated with Agudath Israel of America. The yeshiva is composed of three departments: The Mechina for high school students (Mesivta Bochurim), the yeshiva for post high school students (Beis Medrash Bochurim), and the Kollel for married students (yungerleit—literally translated as "young men"). The graduates of Ner Yisroel are known for their dedication to Torah study and communal leadership.

In 2000, The New York Times described Ner Yisroel as being "unusual in that it has always allowed students access to secular, professional education." This takes place off-premises, as university-accredited night-courses, with the participation of some students.

The yeshiva's alumni have been estimated as 50% rabbis and religious-school teachers, and 50% as professionals: bankers, accountants, physicians, attorneys, psychologists, etc.

== History and past leadership ==
Yaakov Yitzchak Ruderman founded the yeshiva in 1933 with six students. It was based in a local shul. The yeshiva was named after Rabbi Yisrael Lipkin Salanter, the founder of the mussar movement.

Dovid Kronglass, of the Mirrer Yeshiva in Europe (and during World War II in Shanghai) was the yeshiva's first mashgiach ruchani until his death on December 16, 1972. Besides his role as Mashgiach, he also served as a Maggid Shiur and was the Posek of the Yeshiva.

Herman Naftali Neuberger, a son-in-law of Sheftel Kramer, brother-in-law of Ruderman, and an alumnus of the Mirrer Yeshiva in Europe, and of Ner Israel itself, was president of Ner Israel from 1940 until his death in 2005. Neuberger joined the Yeshiva as a student when he arrived from his native Bavaria in 1938.

His son Sheftel Neuberger was full-time assistant 'menahel' from May 1987, the menahel (president) of the yeshiva from 2005, when he succeeded his father, until his death on February 10, 2021. Prior to 2005, Sheftel Neuberger was a Maggid Shiur in the yeshiva for many years, ending that position before Passover 1987 to become full-time assistant 'menahel'.

Shmuel Yaakov Weinberg was on the Ner Yisroel faculty for nearly 50 years. He served as a Maggid Shiur from 1945 to 1965, as well as dean of the Kollel from 1953 to 1965. From 1971 until 1987, he was an assistant to the Rosh Yeshiva and head of the Kollel. From Ruderman's death in 1987 until his own death on July 1, 1999, Weinberg served as Rosh Yeshiva. Yaakov Moshe Kulefsky was the Rosh Yeshiva from Weinberg's death in 1999 until his death on November 30, 2000. Other rabbis who served on the faculty included: Shimon Schwab, later rabbi of the German-Jewish Frankfurt Kehillah / community in Washington Heights N.Y.; Rabbi Simcha Zissel Broide of the Chevron Yeshiva in Jerusalem; Ephraim Eisenberg, the son-in-law of Mordechai Gifter, and Zvi Dov Slanger, a disciple of Rav Shach, who was a Maggid Shiur in the high school for many years until 1996 when he founded and became Rosh Yeshiva of the Bais Medrash & Mesivta Of Baltimore.

The Mechina was founded in 1957 and went through seven principals until Yosef Tendler became the principal of the Mechina in 1964, and remained in that position until his death on February 8, 2012.

== Accreditation ==
Ner Israel is a Maryland state-accredited college through the Association of Advanced Rabbinical and Talmudic Schools – Accreditation Commission (AARTS), and has agreements with Johns Hopkins University, Towson University, Loyola College in Maryland, University of Baltimore, and University of Maryland, Baltimore County allowing undergraduate students to take night courses at these colleges and universities in a variety of academic fields. The agreement also allows the students to receive academic credits for their religious studies. Ner Yisrael also has a pre-med program in association with Stevenson University of Owings Mills.

== Curriculum ==
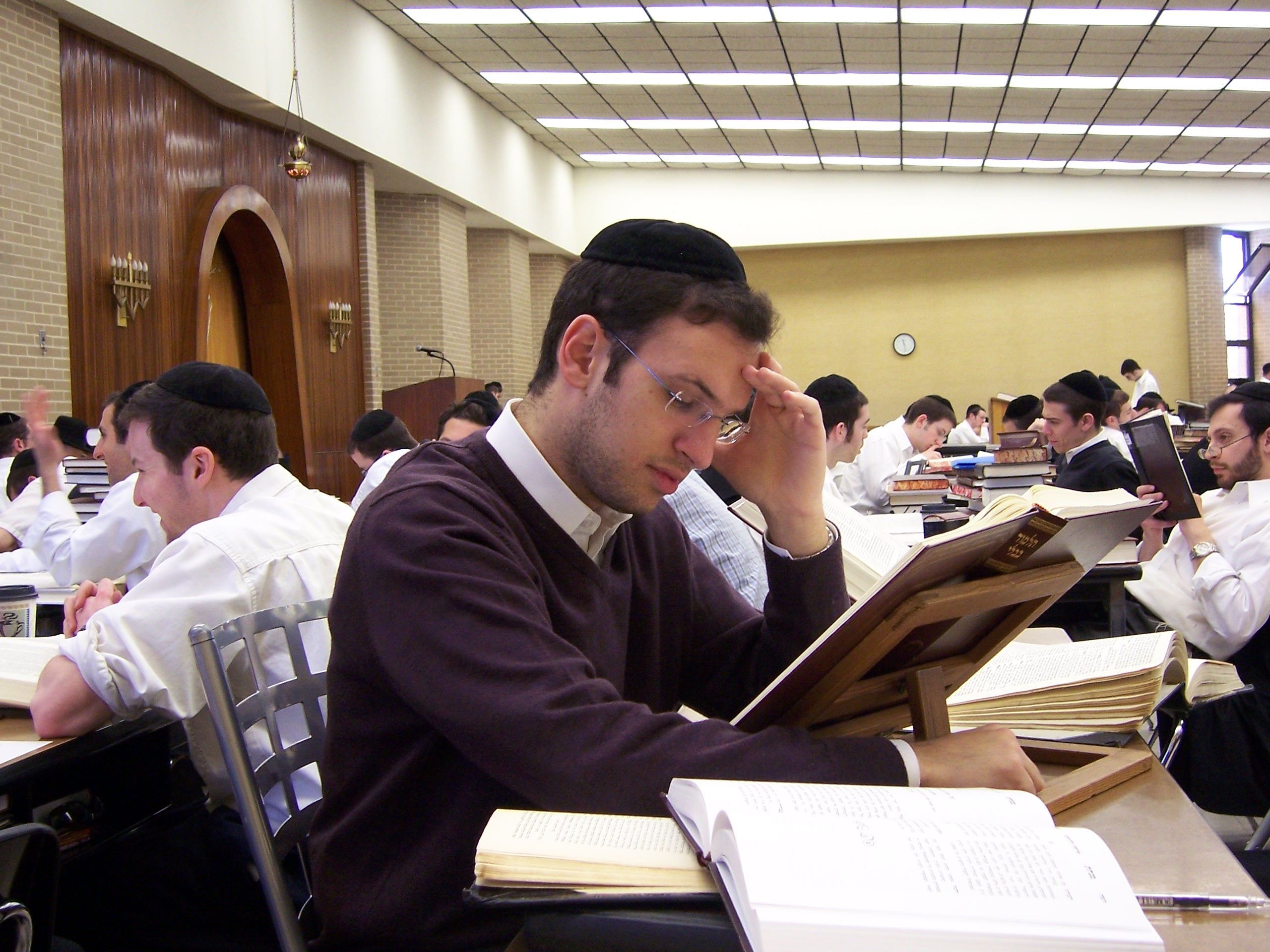
A student studying inside the Bais Medrash

=== Kollel Avodas Levi ===
Ezra Neuberger, son of Herman became Rosh Kollel/Dean of the Kollel/Graduate school in his father's lifetime.

== Degrees and certificates ==
Ner Yisroel's Machon program, which began in 1962, trains religious educators for Jewish communities and schools and students earn a Torah Umesorah recognized certification.

== Student body ==
=== Persian students ===
In the 1970s, due to the political turmoil following the Iranian Revolution and the outbreak of the Iran-Iraq war, life became difficult for Iranian Jews. Rabbi Herman Neuberger was instrumental in bringing over 1,000 young Persian men to the United States, most of whom studied in Ner Yisroel. Ner Yisroel still maintains a special minyan on Shabbos for Persian students. There are large communities of Orthodox Persian Jews in Baltimore, Los Angeles, and New York that are a direct result of Rabbi Neuberger's efforts.

=== South American Students ===
There are many South American students in the yeshiva. This is primarily due to Camp Or Haner, which is a camp for South Americans that is located in Ner Yisroel. Many of the campers remain as students in the yeshiva. The camp was founded by Rabbi Moshe Fuller, who began himself as a South American student of the yeshiva. Fuller died in 2008.

== Notable alumni ==
- Jeff Ballabon – Political consultant and Community activist
- Moishe Bane - President Emeritus of the Orthodox Union
- Rabbi David Bashevkin - American rabbi and professor
- Rabbi Yitzchak Breitowitz – Rav of Kehillas Ohr Somayach, Jerusalem, law professor, and lecturer
- Rabbi Shmuel Bloom - Executive Vice President Emeritus of Agudath Israel of America
- Rabbi Azriel Brown, Rosh Yeshiva, Yeshiva Gedola of Carteret
- Rabbi Abba Cohen, Vice President of Government Affairs of Agudath Israel of America
- Rabbi Aharon Feldman – rosh yeshiva, Yeshivas Ner Israel and member of Moetzes Gedolei HaTorah
- Rabbi Emanuel Feldman – Rabbi Emeritus of Congregation Beth Jacob of Atlanta, Georgia, lecturer
- Rabbi Ilan D. Feldman – Senior Rabbi of Congregation Beth Jacob of Atlanta
- Rabbi Yissocher Frand – maggid shiur and lecturer, Yeshivas Ner Israel
- Hershey Friedman – Canadian billionaire businessman and philanthropist with interests spanning the plastics packaging business and kosher meat in North America to luxury real estate development and Jewish books in Israel.
- Rabbi Pinchas Goldschmidt – Former Chief Rabbi of Moscow
- Rabbi Moshe Hauer, Executive Vice President of the Orthodox Union
- Rabbi Shmuel Kamenetsky – rosh yeshiva, Talmudical Yeshiva of Philadelphia, and member of Moetzes Gedolei HaTorah
- Rabbi Sam (Shlomo) Kassin - Head of the Shehebar Sephardic Center and Chief Rabbi of the Bukharian Quarter of Jerusalem
- Rabbi Dov Lipman – former Israeli Knesset Member, Yesh Atid
- Rabbi Nahum Rabinovitch – Rosh Yeshiva, Yeshivat Birkat Moshe
- Rabbi Idan Scher - Rabbi of Congregation Machzikei Hadas
- Rabbi Nota Schiller – Rosh Yeshiva, Ohr Somayach, Jerusalem
- Rabbi Moshe Sherer – former president of Agudath Israel of America
- Aaron Twerski (born 1939) - the Irwin and Jill Cohen Professor of Law at Brooklyn Law School, as well as a former Dean and professor of tort law at Hofstra University School of Law
- Rabbi Michel Twerski, The Hornosteipler Rebbe of Milwaukee
- Rabbi Noach Weinberg – Rosh Yeshiva, Aish HaTorah
- Rabbi Dr. Ephraim Wolf - Founding Rabbi of the Great Neck Synagogue and the North Shore Hebrew Academy
- Rabbi Yochanan Zweig – Rosh Yeshiva, Yeshiva Bais Moshe Chaim, Miami
