= Rabbinical degree =

Rabbinical degree could mean:

- Bachelor of Talmudic Law
- Master of Rabbinic Studies
