= Moshe Hauer =

American Orthodox rabbi (1965 – 2025)

Rabbi Moshe Hauer

Executive Vice President of the Orthodox Union
- In office May 1, 2020 – October 14, 2025
- Preceded by: Allen Fagin
- Succeeded by: Vacant

Senior Rabbi of Congregation Bnai Jacob Shaarei Zion
- In office 1994 – April 2020
- Succeeded by: Daniel Rose

Personal life
- Born: 1965 Montreal, Quebec, Canada
- Died: October 14, 2025 (aged 60) Baltimore, Maryland, U.S.
- Buried: Har HaMenuchot; October 17, 2025
- Spouse: Mindi Baumgarten
- Children: 7
- Education: Yeshivas Ner Yisrael (BTL); Johns Hopkins University (ME)

Religious life
- Religion: Judaism
- Denomination: Orthodox

Jewish leader
- Disciple of: Yaakov Weinberg
- Semikhah: Yeshivas Ner Yisroel
- Hauer's voice Hauer testifying before the House Committee on Education & Workforce; Recorded November 14, 2023

Moshe I. Hauer (June 20, 1965 – October 14, 2025) was an American rabbi who was the Executive Vice President of the Orthodox Union from 2020 to 2025. He previously served as the senior rabbi of the Bnai Jacob Shaarei Zion Congregation in Baltimore, Maryland from 1994 to 2020.

== Early life and education ==
Hauer was born and raised in Montreal, Quebec, Canada. His father Benjamin, a Romanian Holocaust survivor, and his mother Miriam were the rabbinic couple of the Beth Jacob congregation. He attended Yeshiva Gedola of Montreal for both elementary and high school, followed by Yeshivas Ner Yisrael in Baltimore, where he became a student of Rabbi Yaakov Weinberg. He studied there for over ten years and received rabbinical ordination, a Doctorate in Talmudic Law, and a Bachelor of Talmudic Law. He also received a Master of Engineering from Johns Hopkins University.

== Career ==
Hauer was appointed the senior rabbi of the Bnai Jacob congregation in Baltimore, Maryland in 1994. In 1999, the congregation merged with Shaarei Zion, and was renamed Bnai Jacob Shaarei Zion. In his position he emphasized improving education, social service and support for at-risk children. In 2011, he founded and served as the editor of Klal Perspectives, a journal which addressed contemporary issues through an Orthodox view.

In May 2020, following the retirement of Allen Fagin, Hauer was appointed the Executive Vice President of the Orthodox Union, the oldest and largest Orthodox umbrella organization in the United States. He directed the communal activities of the OU and was its primary spokesman. He was an advocate for Jewish causes in Washington, DC and in local communities. He served as the organization's rabbinic leader and helped lead its outreach to government officials and lawmakers.

In September 2022, Hauer was one of 25 people appointed by US Department of Homeland Security Secretary Alejandro Mayorkas as members of its new Faith-Based Security Advisory Council. In November 2023, he testified at a hearing of the United States House Committee on Education and Workforce regarding antisemitism on college campuses. The hearing led to investigations into several universities for failing to protect Jewish students from antisemitism.

== Personal life and death ==
Hauer identified as Orthodox. He was married to Mindi Baumgarten of Baltimore, and had three sons and four daughters: Yissachar, Yehuda Leib, Shlomo, (Note: One source names him Shalom.) Devorah, Batsheva, Chana, and Rachel. They lived in Baltimore, and Hauer commuted to the OU's headquarters in Manhattan a few times every week.

Hauer died of a heart attack at his home in Baltimore, on October 14, 2025, during the Jewish holiday of Shemini Atzeret. His death at the age of 60 was announced on October 15, following the end of the holiday. His funeral took place on October 16, at Bnai Jacob Shaarei Zion, and he was buried on October 17, at Har HaMenuchot in Jerusalem.

President Donald Trump sent a letter to the Orthodox Union expressing his and the First Lady's "deepest condolences" and adding that Hauer was "a man of deep faith, wisdom, and compassion".

Israeli Prime Minister Benjamin Netanyahu posted on Twitter, calling Rabbi Hauer "a towering leader of faith and unity." He also noted that "As head of the Orthodox Union, he devoted his life to strengthening Jewish identity, bringing Jews closer to one another and closer to Israel."

Israeli president Isaac Herzog said that he is "deeply saddened by the sudden passing of my friend, leader of the OU Rabbi Moshe Hauer, a true leader and teacher in the Jewish world. Each and every conversation I was privileged to have with him was so very meaningful and showed his warmth and kindness, and his unwavering love for Torah, Israel, Zionism and the Jewish people."

Israeli Minister of Diaspora Affairs Amichai Chikli said "I don't use the term 'righteous' often, but in my opinion, Rabbi Moshe Hauer was a righteous man. He was an exceptional Jewish leader and scholar, who guided many with wisdom, courage and deep humility. Nothing concerned Hauer more than instilling love of Torah, of Israel and of the Land of Israel in Jewish children. I was very privileged to work alongside him." Minister of Finance Bezalel Smotrich posted on Twitter that Hauer was a "unique man" and was "committed with all his might to the Jewish people and their unity, to the State of Israel and the connection between it and Diaspora Jewry".

US Senator Josh Hawley said that he was "deeply grieved by the death of my friend, Rabbi Moshe Hauer, leader of the Orthodox Union. His sudden death is a tremendous loss to America and to friends of Israel everywhere. Rabbi Moshe was a man of remarkable integrity and kindness and also foresighted leadership. He was a true and dear friend to me. Erin and I are praying the grace of the Lord for his family and the many people whose lives he touched."

New York Governor Kathy Hochul posted her condolences on Twitter, calling Hauer "a beloved leader and educator in the Jewish community." New York attorney general Letitia James posted her condolences on Twitter.

Yonoson Rosenblum is writing a biography of Hauer as of 2026.
