= Idan Scher =

Canadian rabbi

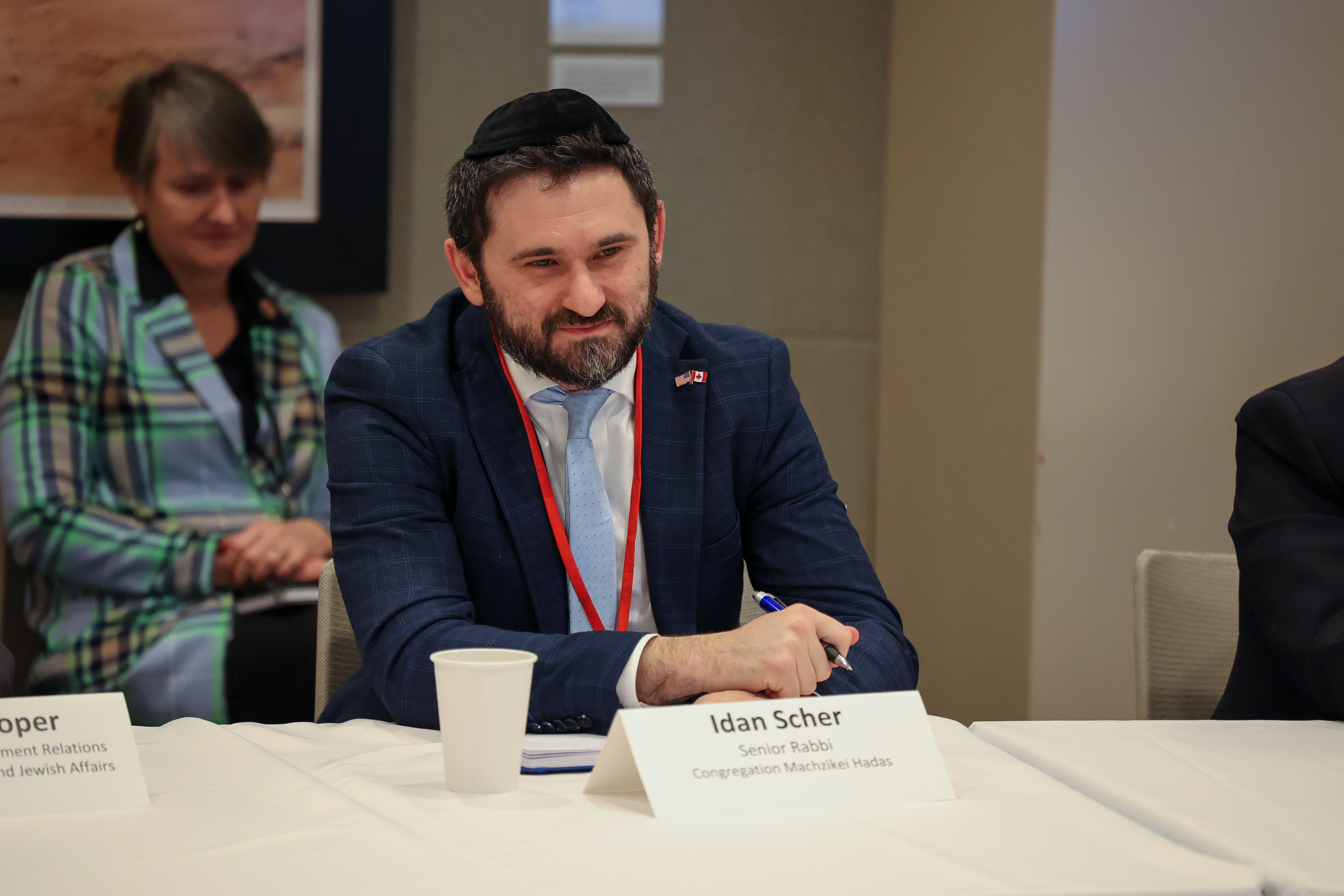
- Scher in 2018
- Education: Johns Hopkins University (MA) Ner Israel Rabbinical College (MTL) Yeshiva Shaar HaTorah (BTL)
- Occupation: Rabbi
- Employer: Congregation Machzikei Hadas
- Website: www.rabbischer.com

Idan Scher is rabbi of Congregation Machzikei Hadas, a modern orthodox synagogue in Ottawa, Ontario, Canada. He was installed as the congregation's next spiritual leader in 2015 making him the youngest senior rabbi of a synagogue this size in all of Canada at the time. Rabbi Scher serves as a vice-president at the Rabbinical Council of America and is a representative of the Canadian Rabbinic Council.

== Education ==
Scher holds rabbinic ordination from both Rabbi Zalman Nechemia Goldberg, the director of the Jerusalem Rabbinical Court, and from Rabbi Gedalya Schwartz, the director of the Beth Din of America. He has an undergraduate degree from Yeshiva Shaar HaTorah in New York, a master's degree in Talmudic law from the Ner Israel Rabbinical College in Baltimore, and an M.A. in public policy and management from Johns Hopkins University.

== Media ==
In 2018, he launched a series of podcasts as part of his nationally acclaimed Jewish-learning platform. The project received funding from a local innovation grant. Scher is a frequent guest on both CTV and CBC News. In addition, Rabbi Scher gives an annual Remembrance Day speech on Parliament Hill, which is broadcast nationwide.

== Personal life ==
Scher lives with his wife and children in Ottawa, Canada.
