= M. Gary Neuman =

M. Gary Neuman is a rabbi, licensed family counselor, Florida Supreme Court-certified family mediator and founder of the Sandcastles Program Inc., a nationwide divorce therapy program for children.

== Author ==
Neuman is the author of three books:

- The Truth about Cheating: Why Men Stray and What You Can Do to Prevent It (Wiley)
- Emotional Infidelity: How to Affair-Proof Your Marriage (Crown)
- Helping Your Kids Cope with Divorce the Sandcastles Way (Random House).

In conjunction with the publication The Truth about Cheating, Neuman appeared on The Oprah Winfrey Show on September 11, 2008 and September 18, 2008.

== Education ==
Neuman holds a masters of science in mental health counseling from Barry University (1987) and rabbinical ordination from Talmudic University (1988).

He resides in Miami Beach, Florida.
