= Frand =

Frand can mean:

- Fair, Reasonable and Non-Discriminatory (FRAND) licensing, also known as reasonable and non-discriminatory licensing
- Rabbi Yissocher Frand, American Orthodox rabbi and author
