= Yeshivas Ner Yisroel of Toronto =

Coordinates: 43°50′21.5″N 79°27′52″W

Yeshivas Ner Yisroel
- ישיבת נר ישראל

Location
- 250 Bathurst Glen; Thornhill, Ontario; Canada

Information
- Motto: Ki Ner Mitzva V'Torah Ohr כי נר מצוה ותורה אור
- Established: 1959
- Head teacher: Uri S. Mayerfeld and Meyer D. Greenberger
- Accreditation: Full Ontario Diploma
- Affiliation: Orthodox
- Website: neryisroel.info

Yeshivas Ner Yisroel of Toronto (Ner Israel Yeshiva College) (Hebrew: נר ישראל) is a Haredi yeshiva (Jewish educational institution) in Vaughan, Ontario, Canada with government recognition of its degree-granting programs. The yeshiva includes both a Beis Midrash program and a high school.

== Programs ==
The yeshiva has been granted restricted degree-granting authority by the Legislative Assembly of Ontario, to grant degrees in the field of religious studies and research in higher Jewish learning at the Bachelors, and Masters levels. In addition, the college offers University Diplomas and Certificates.

The current Roshei HaYeshiva (headmasters) are Rabbi Uri Mayerfeld and Rabbi Meyer D. Greenberger. The Menahel of the High School is Rabbi Dov Diena. The Mashgiach of the High School is Rabbi Yerucham F. Kravetz.

== History ==
The yeshiva was established by Rabbi Sholom Gold in 1959 as a branch of Yeshivas Ner Yisroel in Baltimore (NIRC). Meyer Lebovic and Rabbi Moshe Hochman were also involved. The yeshiva opened in September of that year with 12 students. The yeshiva was located on Finch Avenue for 27 years. The yeshiva has grown to approximately 130 students since then. It is no longer affiliated with Ner Yisroel in Baltimore.

Rabbi Yaakov Weinberg assumed the post of Rosh Yeshiva until 1971. The yeshiva was next headed by Rabbi Naftali Friedler. The mantle of Rosh Yeshiva was then assumed by Rabbi Gavriel Ginsburg in 1988.

== See also ==
- Ontario Student Assistance Program
- Higher education in Ontario
