= Dovid Kronglas =

Baltimore spiritual leader & Yeshiva mentor

Dovid Kronglas (May 6, 1908 – December 16, 1972) was an Orthodox Rabbi in Baltimore, Maryland, who was the Mashgiach Ruchni (spiritual supervisor) of Yeshivas Ner Yisroel of Baltimore, and wrote on Talmudic topics and on Mussar literature.

Kronglas was born in Kobryn on May 6, 1908. to his father, Ezra, and his mother Chaya, and was orphaned at a young age. He studied in the Mirrer Yeshiva where he was known as "Dovid Kobryner" and was a disciple of Rabbi Yeruchom Levovitz. During World War II he traveled with the yeshiva to Shanghai. In 1948, he married Baila, who died on September 15, 2020.

During his years studying in the Mirrer Yeshiva, he oversaw the students from Germany and the United States. As a result, Kronglas became acquainted with Herman N. Neuberger who later joined the leadership of Ner Yisroel and was responsible for bringing Kronglas to join the staff of Ner Yisroel.

== Career ==
In 1945, Kronglas arrived in Canada with a group of refugees, and was invited to serve as the Mashgiach Ruchni of Ner Yisroel where he remained until his death on Saturday, December 16, 1972. He was also a Maggid Shiur, and lectured for the most advanced students. Kronglas also developed many of the liturgical customs of the yeshiva, especially as they relate to the High Holy Days. Every year on his Yahrzeit, a lecture is delivered in Ner Yisroel based on his Talmudic discourses.

== Books ==
- Divrei Dovid - Chidushim on Zeraim
- Chiddushei Reb Dovid Kronglas - on Bava Metzia
- Sichos Chuchma U’Mussar

Additionally, his wife published memories of her husband in a booklet called Sichas Chulin Shel Talmidei Chachamim
