= Machzikei Hadas =

Machzikei Hadas may refer to:

- Machzikei Hadas (synagogue), in Ottawa, Canada
- Machzikei Hadas (organization), founded by Yehoshua Rokeach
