= Aharon Feldman =

American Orthodox Jewish rabbi

Rabbi Aharon Feldman אהרן פלדמן
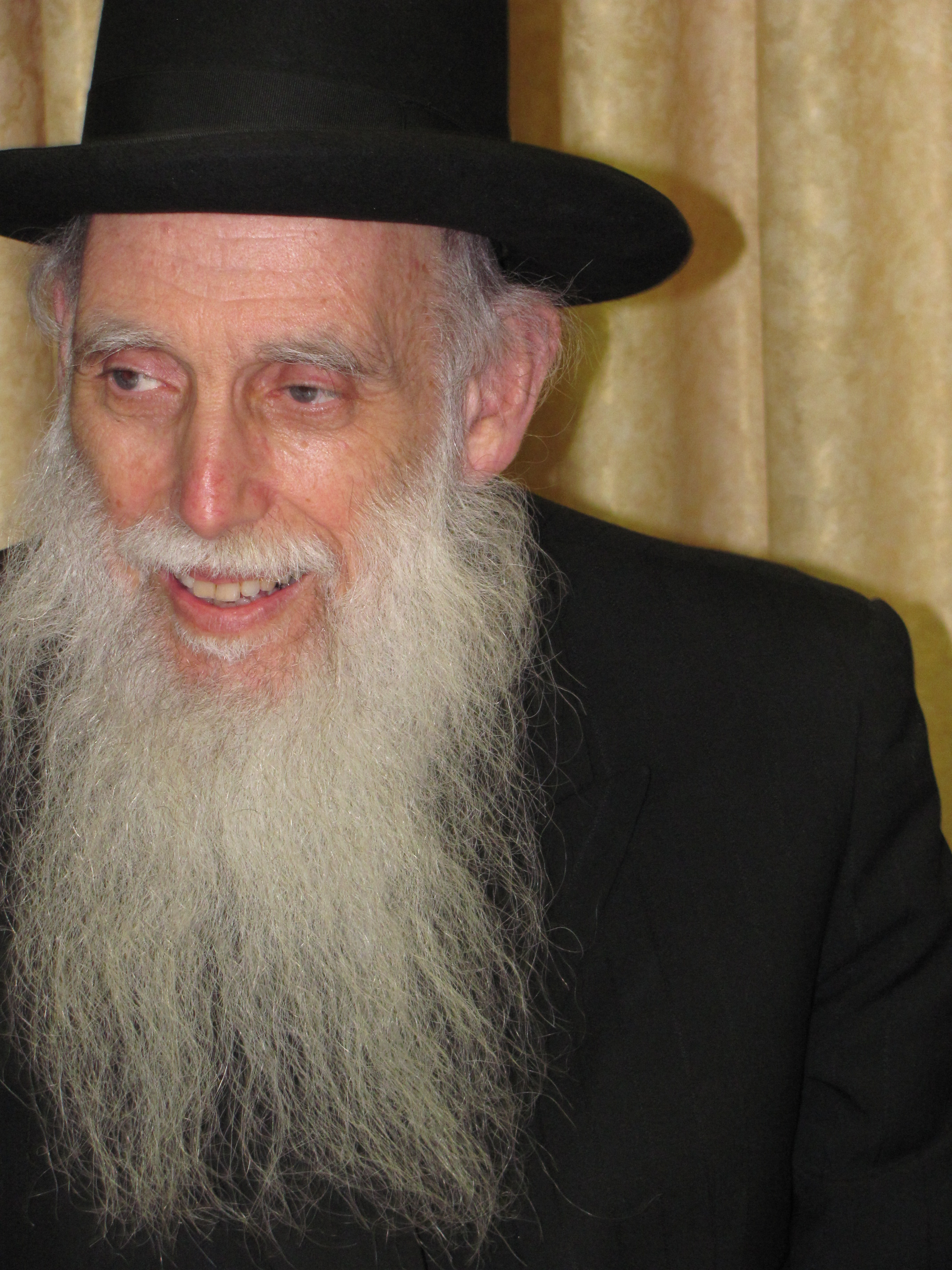
- Rabbi Aharon Feldman in 2010
- Title: Rosh Yeshiva, Yeshivas Ner Yisroel

Personal life
- Born: Aharon Feldman; January 18, 1932 (age 94) Baltimore, Maryland, U.S.
- Spouse: Lea
- Parent: Rabbi Joseph H. Feldman
- Education: Talmudical Academy
- Occupation: Rosh HaYeshiva

Religious life
- Religion: Judaism

Jewish leader
- Predecessor: Rabbi Yaakov Moshe Kulefsky
- Position: Rosh yeshiva
- Yeshiva: Yeshivas Ner Yisroel
- Began: 2001
- Residence: Baltimore/Israel

Aharon Feldman (Hebrew: אהרן פלדמן; born 18 January 1932) is an Orthodox Jewish rabbi and rosh yeshiva (dean) of Yeshivas Ner Yisroel (Ner Israel Rabbinical College) in Baltimore, Maryland. He has held this position since 2001. He is also a member of the Moetzes Gedolei HaTorah (Council of Torah Sages).

== Biography ==
Rabbi Aharon Feldman is the son of Rabbi Josef Feldman (died 1993), a native of Warsaw and scion of a rabbinical family. Rabbi Josef Feldman served as a rabbi in Manchester, New Hampshire, in the 1930s, but left that post to assume the helm of Baltimore's Franklin Street Synagogue so his sons could attend a Hebrew day school. He was the last rabbi to formally serve as chief rabbi of Baltimore. Rabbi Aharon Feldman has two brothers; his elder brother, Rabbi Emanuel Feldman, was the prominent spiritual leader of Congregation Beth Jacob in Atlanta, Georgia, for 40 years. His younger brother, Rabbi Joel Feldman, was a dean of Talmudical Academy of Baltimore.

Rabbi Feldman was born and raised in Baltimore, where he attended the Talmudical Academy and Ner Yisroel, becoming a disciple of Rosh Yeshiva Rabbi Yitzchak Ruderman.

Afterwards, he taught in several yeshivas in New York. He has dual citizenship in both Israel and the US.

In 1961, Rabbi Feldman and his wife Leah made aliyah with their family to Israel, intending to raise their eight children in a more religious environment. They lived in Bnei Brak for 12 years and relocated to Jerusalem in 1973. Rabbi Feldman served as one of the roshei yeshiva of Ohr Somayach, Jerusalem for about 15 years and founded Yeshiva Be'er HaTorah in Jerusalem in the early 1990s.

In 2001, Rabbi Feldman accepted the request of Ner Yisroel to serve as its rosh yeshiva.

In 2005, he was one of 15 Jewish educators invited to an informal discussion on Jewish education in the White House's Roosevelt Room.

Rabbi Feldman serves on the Moetzes Gedolei HaTorah of America.

== Public positions ==
In 1994, Rabbi Feldman spoke publicly against the actions of Baruch Goldstein, saying that there could be "no justification", and describing the actions as "way beyond the pale". Furthermore, in 2026, Rabbi Feldman said that he does not know about “man-made opinions”, meaning that the opinions of Goldstein and Meir Kahane were man-made, “I only know about the opinions of Gedolim” Rabbi Feldman related.

In 2003, in response to a question from Gil Student, Feldman issued a ruling regarding Chabad messianists. He distinguished what he terms the "meshichists" (those who believe the deceased Rabbi Menachem Mendel Schneerson is the messiah) and the "elokists" (those who believe he was a part of God or God "clothed in a body"). He ruled that it is forbidden to associate with elokists under any circumstances due to their heresy and that they cannot be counted for a minyan, stating that most Chabad adherents do not fall under that category. Regarding the meshichists, he determined that while their beliefs do not make them heretics, it is forbidden to conduct any action which would be seen as lending credence to their messianic beliefs.

Feldman has penned a lengthy critical review of the Steinsaltz Talmud. Among many criticisms, he writes, "Specifically, the work is marred by an extraordinary number of inaccuracies stemming primarily from misreadings of the sources; it fails to explain those difficult passages which the reader would expect it to explain; and it confuses him with notes which are often irrelevant, incomprehensible, and contradictory." Feldman says he fears that, "An intelligent student utilizing the Steinsaltz Talmud as his personal instructor might in fact conclude that Talmud in general is not supposed to make sense." Furthermore, writes Feldman, the Steinsaltz Talmud gives off the impression that the Talmud is intellectually flabby, inconsistent, and often trivial.

In 2005, he wrote a critique of Rabbi Natan Slifkin, explaining and defending the 2004 ban issued against Slifkin's books.

Feldman has been an opponent of Open Orthodoxy. He argues that "The basis of Orthodox Judaism is a belief in the Divine origin of both the Oral and Written Torah. Yeshivat Chovevei Torah’s leaders or their graduates have said clearly or implicitly on many occasions that they do not accept that the Torah was authored by Hashem, that parts of the Torah can be excised, and that the Oral Law was developed by Rabbis to adjust the Written Torah to the realities of the time that they lived in. This basic philosophy is what writes them out of Orthodox Jewry."

Rav Feldman has written and spoken strongly against the ideology of Zionism. In a letter to R. Aharon Lichtenstein, he quoted their mutual Rebbe, Rav Yitzhok Hutner, as saying that Zionism is "pure apikorsus." He also quoted Rav Yosef Dov HaLevi Soloveitchik (R. Lichtenstein's father in law) “I remember my father used to say, ‘leum’us [Zionism] is apikorsus“.

In 2020, Rav Feldman gave the keynote address at the Annual Agudah Convention. He spoke about the fact that the Eretz Hakodesh slate joining the WZO violated what a century of Gedolei Torah (from the Chofetz Chaim to Rav Elyashiv) warned Torah Jews not to do. He asserted that alleged support for the project from Rav Chaim was not true. He stated that all of the reasons the Gedolim had for not joining in with the Zionist organization still held today. Among the reasons he gave is that to join one had to agree to the kfirah of the Jerusalem Program, and that by joining with reform and other groups it seems like a legitimization of those groups, which are strictly forbidden. He described the kefirah of Zionism as a dismantling of the Torah by making the land, language, and culture central to the Jewish People as opposed to only the Torah.

== Selected bibliography ==
- The River, the Kettle and the Bird: A Torah guide to successful marriage. Feldheim Publishers. 1987. ISBN 0873064402.
- The Juggler and the King: The Jew and the Conquest of Evil: An elaboration of the Vilna Gaon's insights into the hidden wisdom of the Sages. Feldheim Publishers. 1990. ISBN 0873065573.
- The Eye of the Storm: A calm view of raging issues. Yad Yosef Publications. 2009. ISBN 978-1598264548.
- Mishnah Berurah: The Classic Commentary to Shulchan Aruch Orach Chayim, Comprising the Laws of Daily Jewish Conduct (editor, Hebrew-English edition, 12 volumes)
- Yad L'Peah on Maseches Peah (1967) (Book Review in HaPardes; digital edition of Yad L'Peah at the Ner Israel Archive).
