= Yeshiva of Far Rockaway =

- Derech Ayson Rabbinical Seminary
- יְשִׁיבָה דֶרֶךְ אֵיתָן

Location
- 802 Hicksville Rd. Far Rockaway, Queens, New York 11691; United States
- 40°36′01″N 73°44′38″W

Information
- Religious affiliation: Judaism
- Founded: 1969
- Founder: Rabbi Nachman Bulman, Rabbi Yechiel Yitzchok Perr
- CEEB code: 331892
- English studies principal: Rabbi Eli Goldgrab
- Judaic studies principal: Rabbi Mordechai Miller
- Head of school: Rabbi Moshe Perr
- Grades: 9–12, seminary
- Gender: Male
- Enrollment: 160
- Average class size: 25
- Language: English
- Website: http://www.yofr.org

Yeshiva of Far Rockaway (also known as Yeshiva Derech Ayson (Hebrew: יְשִׁיבָה דֶרֶךְ אֵיתָן) and Derech Ayson Rabbinical Seminary) is a yeshiva located at 802 Hicksville Road, Far Rockaway, Queens in New York City. It comprises a high school, beis medrash, and Kollel. The school was founded by Rabbi Yechiel Yitzchok Perr, and by Rabbi Nachman Bulman. Rabbi Yechiel Yitzchok Perr was the rosh yeshiva (dean) until his death in May 2024, and was succeeded by his son, Rabbi Moshe Perr. It has intensive Talmudic studies, and features the rosh yeshiva's musar (ethics) lectures in the Novardok tradition. The yeshiva also has a kollel, Kollel Ner Rochel Leah, for married students.

== History ==
Rabbi Yechiel Perr, an alumnus of Yeshiva Beis Yosef-Novardok in Brooklyn, Beth Medrash Govoha, the Talmudical Yeshiva of Philadelphia, and Mesivta Yeshiva Rabbi Chaim Berlin, founded the Yeshiva of Far Rockaway in 1969. The name of the yeshiva, Derech Ayson, is derived from a sefer (Jewish religious book) by Rabbi Avraham Yoffen of Novardok. After Perr's death his son, Rabbi Moshe Perr, succeeded him as dean.

The yeshiva's principal from 1970 was Rabbi Aaron Brafman, older brother of attorney Benjamin Brafman. After Rabbi Brafman's passing, Rabbi Mordechai Miller became the principal of judaic studies in his place.

== Notable alumni ==
- Rabbi Azriel Brown, Rosh Yeshiva, Yeshiva Gedola of Carteret
- Rabbi Yaakov Mayer, Rosh Yeshiva, Yeshiva Gedola of Carteret
- Ari Goldwag, Jewish recording artist, songwriter, and producer
- Rabbi Ezra Schwartz, Rosh Yeshiva, Yeshiva University
- Rabbi Chaim Steinmetz, Senior Rabbi, Congregation Kehilath Jeshurun
