= Yechiel Perr =

American rabbi (1935–2024)

Rabbi Yechiel Yitzchok Perr
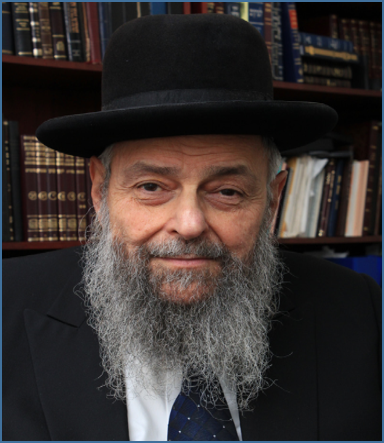

Personal life
- Born: 1935 South Ozone Park, Queens, New York, U.S.
- Died: May 3, 2024 (aged 88–89)
- Spouse: Shoshana Nekritz
- Parent: Menachem Mendel Perr
- Education: Talmudical Yeshiva of Philadelphia; Lakewood Yeshiva
- Occupation: Rosh yeshiva

Religious life
- Religion: Judaism
- Denomination: Orthodox

Jewish leader
- Yeshiva: Yeshiva Derech Ayson (Yeshiva of Far Rockaway)
- Organization: Founder and rosh yeshiva
- Main work: Shoshanas Ha'amakim: Parsha Lessons, Life Lessons (2019), Tzidkus Stands Forever (2011)

Yechiel Yitzchok Perr (1935– May 3, 2024) was an American rabbi. He was the founder and rosh yeshiva of Yeshiva Derech Ayson (Yeshiva of Far Rockaway) in Far Rockaway, New York.

== Biography ==
Yechiel Yitzchak Perr was born and raised in South Ozone Park, Queens, where his father, Menachem Mendel Perr served as a rabbi for over 50 years. He attended high school at Mesivta Yeshiva Rabbi Chaim Berlin. After completing high school, he studied at the Talmudical Yeshiva of Philadelphia, and then at Lakewood Yeshiva in Lakewood, New Jersey, under Aharon Kotler from 1954 to 1962.

== Personal life and death ==
Rabbi Perr married Shoshana Nekritz, daughter of Rabbi Yehuda Leib Nekritz, granddaughter of Rabbi Avraham Yoffen, and great-granddaughter of 'the Alter of Novardok', Rabbi Yosef Yozel Horwitz. After his marriage he came into contact with the Novardok tradition. He went on to study at Yeshivat Beis Yosef-Novardok in Brooklyn, New York. In 1969, he established the Yeshiva of Far Rockaway, which also runs a high school and an accredited rabbinical studies program. Rabbi Perr died on May 3, 2024, at the age of 89.

== Published works ==
- "Reb Yisroel – Who Was He?" The Jewish Observer, June 1969.
- Tzidkus Stands Forever: The Life and Lessons of Rabbi Menachem M. Perr zt”l, September 2011.
- Shoshanas Ha'amakim: Parsha Lessons, Life Lessons, 2019.
- מגילות רות ואסתר עם פירוש שושנת העמקים, 2020. A commentary on the books of Esther and Ruth, in Hebrew.
- שושנת העמקים על מועדי השנה, 2021. Lectures on the festivals, in Hebrew.

Additionally, Yehuda Keilson published two books, Mind Over Man and Faith Over Fear, based on Rav Perr's Mussar lectures on Madreigas Ha’adam.

On July 20, 2022, David Jemal published Choosing Not To Choose, based on Rav Perr's Mussar lectures on the Tekufos Ha'Olam section of the Madreigas Ha'adam.

A series of Rav Perr's conversations on Mussar are described in the following books by Alan Morinis:

- Climbing Jacob's Ladder. Broadway, 2002. ISBN 0-7679-0645-4.
- Everyday Holiness: The Jewish Spiritual Path of Mussar. Trumpeter Books, 2007. ISBN 1-59030-368-7.
