= Aaron Twerski =

American lawyer and professor (born 1939)

Aaron D. Twerski
- Born: May 1939 (age 87); Milwaukee, Wisconsin, U.S.
- Education: J. D., Marquette University Law School; B. S., University of Wisconsin–Milwaukee; A. B., Beth Medrash Elyon Talmudic Research Institute; Ner Israel Rabbinical College
- Known for: Tort and product liability law
- Title: Irwin and Jill Cohen Professor of Law
- Spouse: Kreindel Twerski (m. 1960)
- Relatives: Michel Twerski (brother); Abraham J. Twerski (brother)
- Awards: Robert B. McKay Law Professor Award (2007); William L. Prosser Award; R. Ammi Cutter Reporter Award
- Scientific career
- Fields: Law
- Workplaces: Brooklyn Law School, Hofstra University, Duquesne University School of Law, Cornell University, Harvard Law School, University of Michigan, and Boston University

Aaron D. Twerski (born May 1939) is an American lawyer and professor. He is the Irwin and Jill Cohen Professor of Law at Brooklyn Law School, as well as a former dean and professor of tort law at Hofstra University School of Law.

== Early and personal life ==
He is descended from the Hasidic dynasties of Chernobyl, Chabad, Sanz, and Bobov. He and his twin brother Rabbi Michel Twerski were the youngest sons of Rabbi Jacob Israel Twerski (1899–1973) and Rebbetzin Dvorah Leah Twerski (1900–1995). He was born and raised in Milwaukee, Wisconsin, where his father was the rabbi of Congregation Beth Jehudah. Aaron Twerski is the younger brother of Rabbi Abraham J. Twerski (1930–2021), a psychiatrist and author of 55 books on Judaism and self-image. His twin brother is the rabbi of Congregation Beth Jehudah.

He has been married to Kreindel Twerski since 1960. They live in Brooklyn, New York.

== Education ==
Twerski has an A.B. in Talmudic Law from Beth Medrash Elyon Talmudic Research Institute (1962), and attended Ner Israel Rabbinical College. He received his Bachelor of Science in philosophy from the University of Wisconsin–Milwaukee (1970), where he was a member of the Phi Eta Sigma National Honor fraternity. He holds a Juris Doctor, cum laude, from Marquette University Law School (1965), where he was the student editor of the Marquette Law Review. He received the Marquette Law School Lifetime Achievement Award in 2019.

== Career ==
He was a trial attorney with the United States Department of Justice, Civil Rights Division – Honors Program, 1965–66, and a teaching fellow at Harvard Law School from 1966 to 1967. Twerski has been a visiting professor at Cornell Law School, Boston University, and the University of Michigan.

He has been a professor since 1986 at Brooklyn Law School, where he is the Irwin and Jill Cohen Professor of Law and teaches conflict of laws, product liability, and torts. He served as Dean of Hofstra University School of Law beginning in 2005. In 2017 he left Hofstra Law School and returned to Brooklyn Law School.

He is the author of six books and more than 80 articles in scholarly journals about torts, products liability, and conflict of laws. He is a scholar who served as co-reporter for the American Law Institute’s Restatement of Torts Third: Products Liability, receiving the prestigious designation of "R. Ammi Cutter Reporter" for his outstanding performance.

He received the William L. Prosser Award from the Association of American Law Schools. He also received the Robert B. McKay Law Professor Award from the American Bar Association's Tort Trial & Insurance Practice Section.

He was appointed by federal judge Alvin Hellerstein as one of two Special Masters to handle cases filed by workers who suffered respiratory illnesses as a result of cleaning up the World Trade Center site after the September 11, 2001 terror attacks.
