= Uri Mayerfeld =

21st-century Canadian Rosh Yeshiva

Rabbi Uri Mayerfeld שליט"א

Personal life
- Born: Uri Shraga Mayerfeld Vineland, New Jersey
- Spouse: Esther Mayerfeld (Friedler)
- Parent(s): Manfred Mayerfeld and Else (Lustig) Mayerfeld
- Occupation: Rosh Yeshiva

Religious life
- Religion: Judaism

Jewish leader
- Predecessor: Rabbi Gavriel Ginsburg
- Yeshiva: Yeshivas Ner Yisroel of Toronto
- Position: Rosh Yeshiva
- Residence: Vaughan, Ontario
- Semikhah: Beis Medrash Govoha

Uri Shraga Mayerfeld is a Rabbi and posek in Canada. He is the current Rosh Yeshiva (headmaster) of Yeshivas Ner Yisroel of Toronto in Toronto, Ontario.

== Biography ==
Rabbi Mayerfeld was born in Vineland, New Jersey. His father, Manfred Mayerfeld, was in the poultry business and was an active member of the Vineland Jewish community.

In his early years, Rabbi Mayerfeld studied in Philadelphia Yeshiva under the tutelage of Rabbi Shmuel Kamenetsky and Rabbi Elya Svei, and in Brisk yeshiva under the tutelage of Rabbi Berel Soloveitchik. He also studied under Rabbi Shneur Kotler and Rabbi Nosson Wachtfogel, and received smicha (rabbinic ordination) in 1971 from their yeshiva Beth Medrash Govoha of Lakewood, New Jersey.

When Rabbi Mayerfeld joined the Ner Yisroel faculty, he was a high school rebbi (religious studies teacher). He was promoted to Rosh Yeshiva after the death of the former Rosh Yeshiva, Rabbi Dov Gavriel Ginsburg.

Currently, Rabbi Mayerfeld is an active leader of the Toronto Jewish community. He leads a daf yomi (Talmud) class for the general public and frequently speaks at public Jewish events.
