= Association of Advanced Rabbinical and Talmudic Schools =

Association of Jewish Orthodox Schools

Coordinates: 38.909113°N 77.04443°W

The Association of Advanced Rabbinical and Talmudic Schools (AARTS) is a faith-based national accreditation association for rabbinical and Talmudic schools. It is based in New York, NY, and is recognized by the Council for Higher Education Accreditation and United States Department of Education.

In the field of rabbinical and Talmudic education, the association sees itself as both a gatekeeper and a historical authority. They aim to hold traditional thought in a modern world through a balance of the old and new.

== Operations ==
AARTS is an independently run, non-profit organization composed of experts in rabbinical and Talmudic training that sets educational standards nationwide. The association evaluates both undergraduate and graduate programs. All of these programs must meet established standards in education, finance, and graduate requirements to be considered for accreditation.

== Compared ==
Since AARTS meets Council for Higher Education Accreditation and United States Department of Education recognition criteria, AARTS standards correspond to those of regional accreditors. AARTS accreditation, however, does not guarantee regional accreditation and vice versa. Contrary to the principles laid out by the Council for Higher Education Accreditation in Transfer and the Public Interest: A Statement to the Community, many regionally accredited institutions continue to base transfer credit decisions solely or primarily upon regional accreditation.

== See also ==
- List of Jewish universities and colleges in the United States
- List of recognized accreditation associations of higher learning
- School accreditation
- Bachelor of Talmudic Law
- Master of Rabbinic Studies
