= Dawhinava =

Agrotown in Minsk Region, Belarus

Dawhinava Даўгінава (Belarusian) Dolginovo
- Agrotown
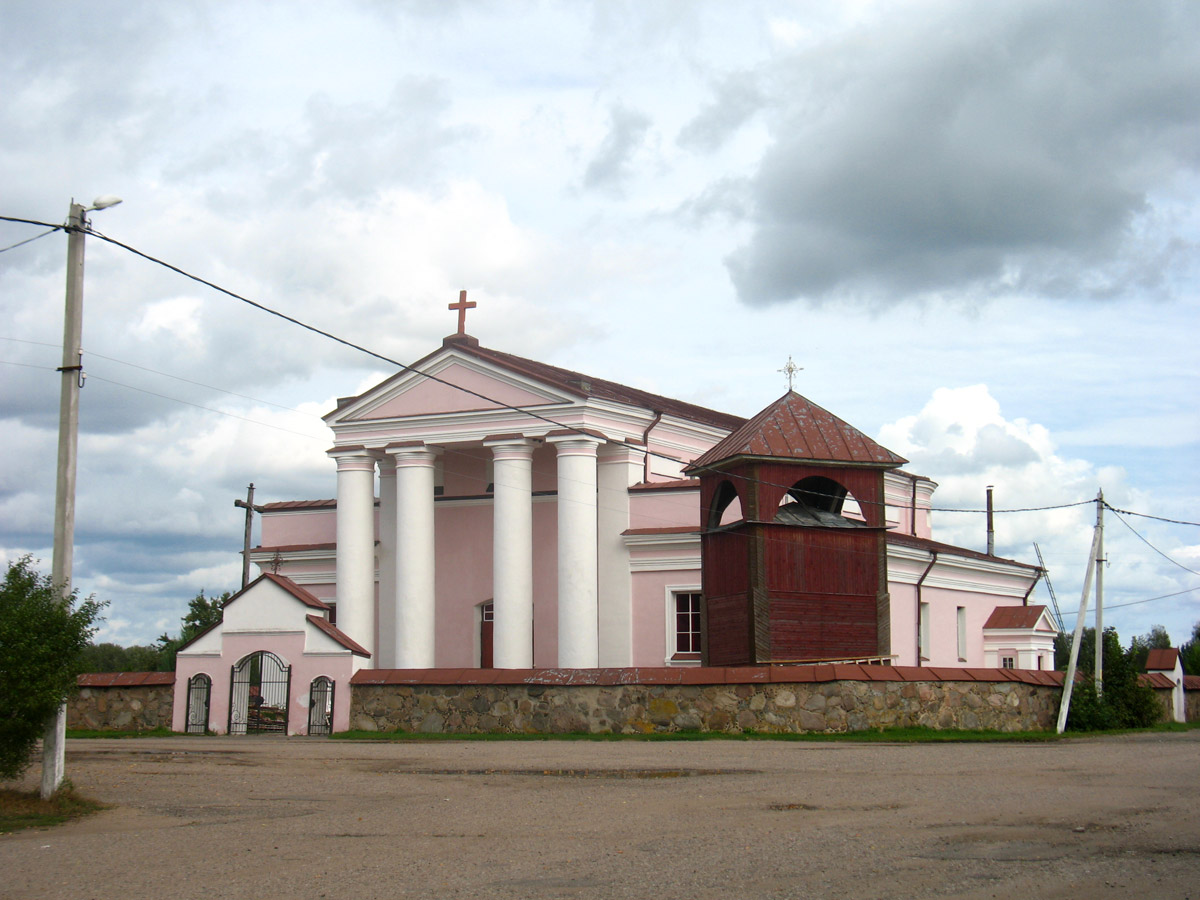
- Saint Stanislaus Catholic Church

- Location within Belarus
- Coordinates: 54°39′N 27°29′E
- Country: Belarus
- Region: Minsk Region
- District: Vileyka District
- Time zone: UTC+3 (MSK)

Dawhinava (Belarusian: Даўгінава, romanized: Daŭhinava; Russian: Долги́ново, romanized: Dolginovo; Lithuanian: Dauginava; Polish: Dołhinów; Yiddish: דאלהינאוו) is an agrotown in Vileyka District, Minsk Region, Belarus. It is located 82 kilometres (51 mi) north of the capital Minsk and 40 km (25 mi) east-northeast of Vileyka. It serves as the administrative center of Dawhinava selsoviet.

== History ==
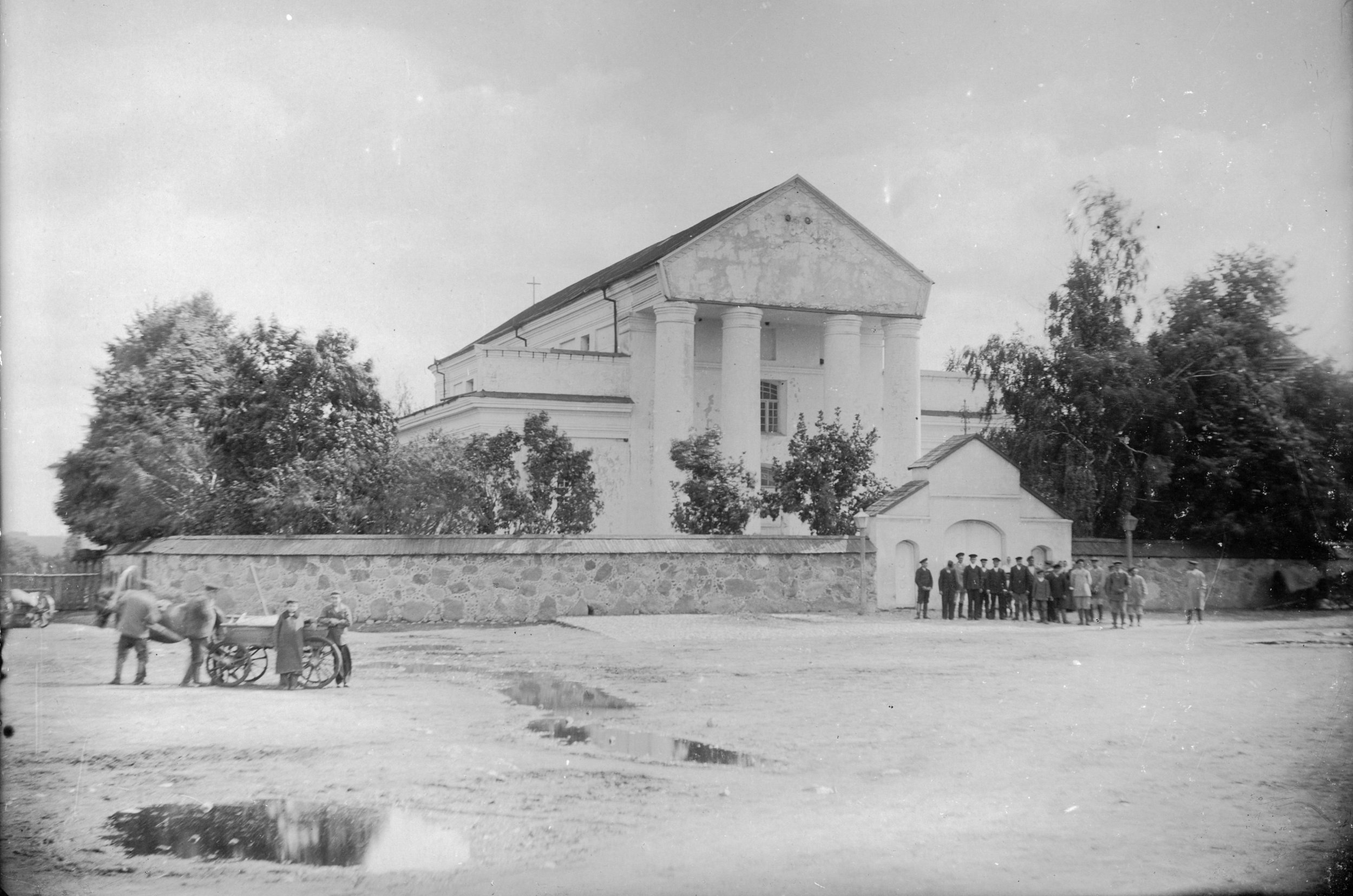
Saint Stanislaus Catholic Church in the early 20th-century

King Stephen Bathory passed through the town before recapturing Polotsk. During the Russo-Polish War of 1654–1667, a battle between Lithuanian and Russian forces was fought in the town's vicinity in 1661.

During the interwar period, it was part of the Wilno Voivodeship of the Second Polish Republic. In the 1921 census, 52.2% people declared Jewish nationality, 39.4% declared Polish nationality, 7.9% declared Belarusian nationality.

Following the joint German-Soviet invasion of Poland, which started World War II in September 1939, the town was first occupied by the Soviet Union until 1941, then by Nazi Germany until 1944, and re-occupied by the Soviet Union afterwards.

=== Jewish history ===
There were 1,194 Jews in Dawhinava in 1847, 2,559 in 1897 out of a total population of 3,551 (based on statistical analysis of the 1897 All Russia Census, for the Vileyka district town of Dolginovo), 2,259 in 1900 and 1,747 in 1921 (out of 2,671). See the Dolhinow yizkor book for additional information. Rabbi Yaakov Yitzchok Ruderman was born in Dawhinava, and his cousin Rabbi Yaakov Kamenetsky grew up in the town.

== Demographics ==
Historical population
Year	Pop.	±%
1886	1,439	—
1921	2,671	+85.6%
