= Michel Twerski =

American rabbi (born 1939)

Hornosteipler Rebbe Michel Twerski
- Born: May 1939 (age 87); Milwaukee, Wisconsin
- Education: Hebrew Theological College (Chicago); Ner Israel Yeshiva (Baltimore); Beth Hamedrosh Govoha Yeshiva (Lakewood, New Jersey); Marquette University (Milwaukee)
- Occupation: Rabbi
- Organization: Congregation Beth Jehudah
- Predecessor: Jacob Israel Twerski
- Spouse: Feige Twerski
- Children: 11
- Relatives: Aaron Twerski (brother); Abraham J. Twerski (brother); Motel Twerski (brother); Shlomo Twerski (brother)

Michel Twerski (born May 1939) is an American Hasidic rabbi and composer of Jewish music who heads the Beth Jehudah congregation in Milwaukee. He is the brother of the psychiatrist and rabbi Abraham J. Twerski. Twerski is a descendant of the Chernobyler Hasidic dynasty. He is also known as the Hornosteipler Rebbe of Milwaukee.

== Family ==
Twerski is married to Feige Twerski (née Stein), a Jewish author and lecturer.

Twerski is a son of Grand Rebbe Jacob Israel Twerski (1898–1973) of Hornosteipel of Milwaukee, Wisconsin a scion of the Chernobyl Hasidic dynasty, and Dvorah Leah Twerski (1900–1995), daughter of Grand Rabbi Ben Zion Halberstam of the Bobov Hasidic dynasty. After his father's death, Twerski succeeded him as Rebbe of Milwaukee.

Twerski is the brother of author, rabbi and psychiatrist Abraham J. Twerski of Israel, and the twin brother of Aaron Twerski, the Irwin and Jill Cohen Professor of Law at Brooklyn Law School, as well as a former Dean at Hofstra University School of Law.

== Tributes ==
Thomas M. Barrett of Wisconsin gave a tribute to Twerski in the United States Congress. Twerski was honored for his contribution to Jewish life and to the world of music.

The Milwaukee Symphony Orchestra conducted a tribute honoring Twerski's musical contributions.
