= Master of Rabbinic Studies =

The Master of Rabbinic Studies (MRb) is a graduate degree granted by a Yeshiva or rabbinical school. It involves the academic study of Talmud, Jewish law, philosophy, ethics, and rabbinic literature (see Yeshiva § Curriculum. In many institutions, this degree is a standard component in the study for semicha (rabbinic ordination). At accredited institutions, this degree requires between 72 and 90 credit hours of study; 72 being the minimum determined by academic accrediting agencies and 90 being on the upper end of certain schools that wish to ensure a broader study of the related material. The Master of Talmudic Law is closely related.

== Contemporary usage ==
The MRb is a significantly more extensive program than most master's degrees. The degree usually consists on average of 90 semester hours, as opposed to the usual 36 or 48. Ordination in a mainstream yeshiva or rabbinical school requires seven or eight years of education past high school: the first four in undergraduate studies leading to a Bachelor of Talmudic Law and then three or four years of seminary or rabbinical school leading to the MRb. See Rabbi § Orthodox and Modern Orthodox Judaism and Yeshiva § Jewish law.

== Accreditation and recognition ==
In North America, four entities that accredit religious schools in particular are recognized by the United States Department of Education and the Council for Higher Education Accreditation:

1. Association for Biblical Higher Education (ABHE)
2. Association of Advanced Rabbinical and Talmudic Schools (AARTS)
3. Association of Theological Schools in the United States and Canada (ATS)
4. Transnational Association of Christian Colleges and Schools (TRACS)

Since these accreditors meet Council for Higher Education Accreditation and United States Department of Education recognition criteria, standards correspond to those of regional accreditors. Contrary to the principles laid out by the Council for Higher Education Accreditation in Transfer and the Public Interest: A Statement to the Community, many regionally accredited institutions continue to base transfer credit decisions solely or primarily upon regional accreditation.

== See also ==
- Bachelor of Talmudic Law
- List of rabbinical schools § Orthodox
- Talmudic law
- Yeshiva § College credit
