= Rosh mesivta =

The title rosh mesivta (alt. rosh metivta; Hebrew: ראש מתיבתא; from Jewish Babylonian Aramaic rêsh mṯivtā ריש מתיבתא), abbreviated as Ram (ר״מ), is a term in Jewish education for the person in charge of a Jewish all-boys high school, as "Rosh" in Hebrew means "Head", and "Mesivta" is the accepted term for a Jewish all-boys high school. The term has a long history, going back many centuries.

The role is comparable to a dean in a university. Just as a chancellor outranks a dean, a rosh yeshiva, when both exist, is higher.

== See also ==
- Mesivta
