= Yaakov Weinberg =

American rabbi (1923–1999)

Rabbi Shmuel Yaakov Weinberg
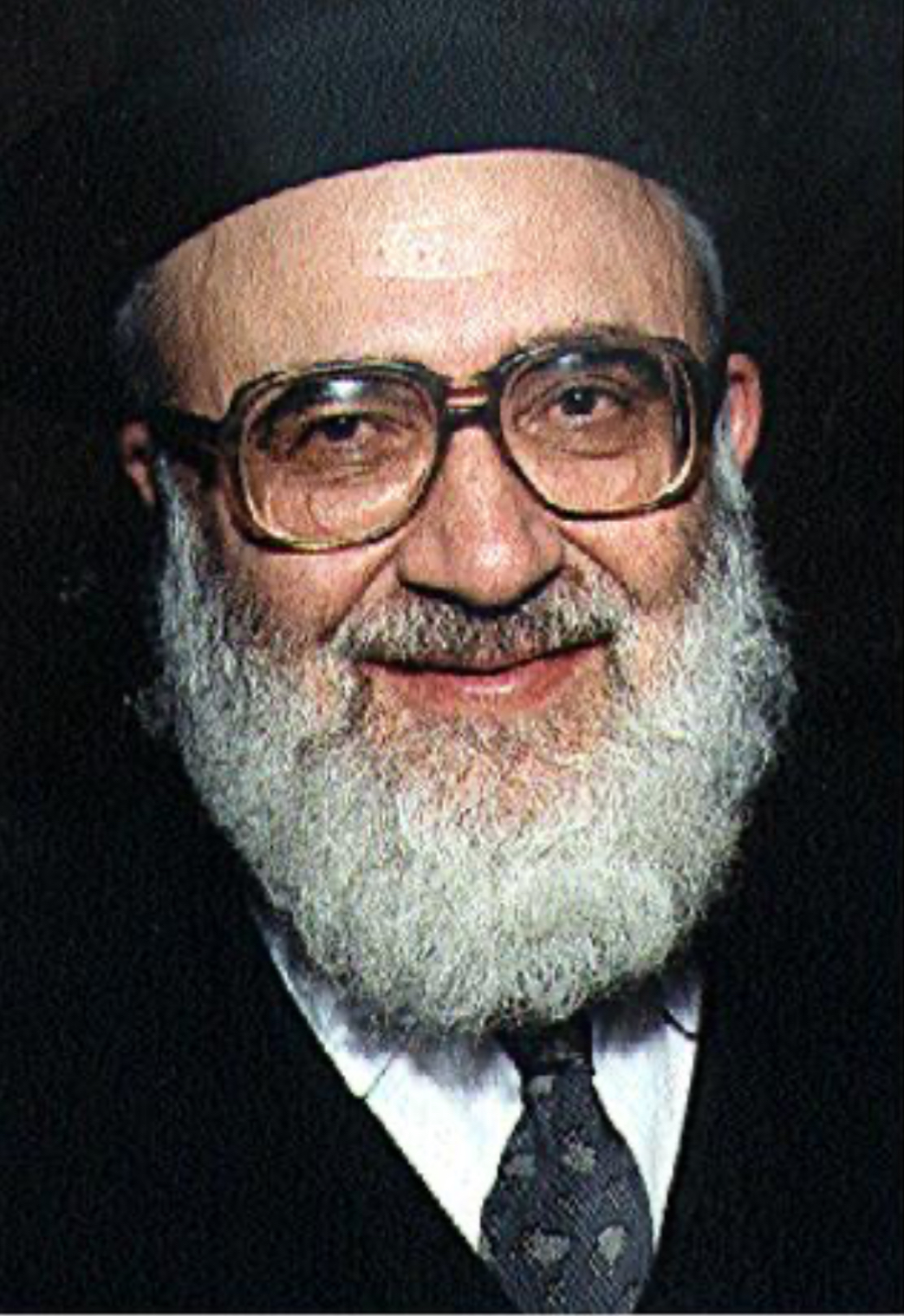
- Title: Rosh Yeshiva (dean), Yeshivas Ner Yisroel

Personal life
- Born: Shmuel Yaakov Weinberg; 1923
- Died: 1 July 1999 (aged 75–76)
- Spouse: Chana Ruderman
- Children: 6
- Occupation: rabbi

Religious life
- Religion: Judaism

Jewish leader
- Predecessor: Yaakov Yitzchok Ruderman
- Successor: Yaakov Moshe Kulefsky
- Position: Rosh yeshiva
- Yeshiva: Yeshivas Ner Yisroel

Shmuel Yaakov Weinberg, known as Yaakov Weinberg (also Jacob S. Weinberg) (1923 – July 1, 1999) was a rabbi in the Orthodox Jewish tradition, and rosh yeshiva (dean) of Ner Israel Rabbinical College in Baltimore, Maryland, an American non-Hasidic yeshiva. Weinberg was also a rabbinical advisor and board member of the Association for Jewish Outreach Programs.

== Early life and family ==
Weinberg was a descendant of the Slonimer Hasidic dynasty. He was the great-great-grandson of Rabbi Avraham of Slonim, author of Yesod HaAvodah and founder of the dynasty, and the grandson of Rabbi Noah Weinberg of Slonim and Tiberias, whom the first Slonimer Rebbe had sent to Palestine to establish a Torah community in the late 19th century.

He was the son of Yitzchak Mattisyahu Weinberg, a rabbi, and his third wife, Ayala Hinda Loberbaum, whom he married when he was in his thirties and she was fourteen. They had five children, including Yaakov and Noah, the founder and rosh yeshiva (dean) of Aish Hatorah.

In 1931 his mother took him and his brother to Israel for three years. During that time, Weinberg attended school in Tiberias and later studied in the Etz Chaim Yeshiva in Jerusalem. Upon their return to America, Weinberg attended Yeshiva Torah Vodaas and Yeshivas Chofetz Chaim, and later studied at Yeshiva Rabbi Chaim Berlin under Yitzchak Hutner, who gave him semikhah (rabbinic ordination) in 1944 when he was 21. To further broaden his exposure to Torah, Rabbi Hutner sent his prize talmid to Lakewood for Shabbosos, to afford him the opportunity to observe and learn from Rabbi Aharon Kotler Zt”l, as well.

In 1945, Weinberg married Shaina Chana Ruderman, daughter of Rabbi Yaakov Yitzchok Ruderman, founder of the Ner Israel yeshiva. They had two boys and four girls.

== Career ==
In 1964, Weinberg went to the Yeshivas Ner Yisroel of Toronto originally the Toronto branch of Ner Israel, where he served as dean until 1971. He then returned to Baltimore but went on to serve for a short time as rosh yeshiva at the now defunct Kerem Yeshiva founded by his son, Rabbi Matis Weinberg, in Santa Clara, California. However, following the death of his father-in-law, Rabbi Ruderman, he became the permanent rosh yeshiva of Ner Israel in Baltimore in 1987 until his death in 1999.

== Death and legacy ==
Weinberg died of cancer.

After his death a student compiled and published his work on Maimonides, entitled Meoros HaRambam.
