= Yaakov Moshe Kulefsky =

American born rabbi/teacher, Ner Yisroel Yeshiva

Rabbi Yaakov Moshe Kulefsky (December 14, 1925 - November 30, 2000) was an American-born rabbi and teacher. He served as both dean and rosh yeshiva at Yeshivas Ner Yisroel for decades, until the last year of his life.

== Early life ==
His parents, Raphael Nisan Shlomo (Nathan) and Rachel (Rose), had a business in Chicago, where he was born. The family moved to St. Louis for a better opportunity. This "opportunity" did not include a better Jewish education, and at age 15 he was sent to study in Chicago's Beis Medrash L'Torah, specifically to learn from Dovid Lifshitz. Three years later he transferred to Mesivta Torah V'Daas. Despite his yeshiva rabbinical student status, he was drafted into the United States Army August 1944.

While on leave during his training period mid-week, he spent time in a Jewish book store frequented by his future father-in-law. He was discharged in early 1946. He married Sarah Gartenhouse on June 18, 1947. Through 1954, he studied at Bais Medrash Elyon, in Monsey, at which time, with the help of a cousin already at Yeshiva Ner Yisroel, he accepted a teaching position.

== Teacher ==
A student, asking his teacher, Kulefsky, how he remembered so many details connected with so many topics he taught, was told: "Do you remember how many children you have? Do you remember their names?" His teaching role began while in the U.S. Army; when given a Shabbos off, he'd walk miles from his training base to Yeshiva Torah Vodaas and lecture.

== Dean, Ner Yisroel ==
He also was involved with the testing process for rabbinical ordination at Ner Yisroel.

When the school was able to accept students permitted to leave Iran, he "became almost like a surrogate parent to them." Kulefsky served as the rosh yeshiva from Rabbi Weinberg's death in 1999 until his own death on November 30, 2000.

Yissocher Frand compared how his personality was able to "transmit to literally thousands of talmidim" because his method was like giving "a baby its first lollypop" leading to many a life-long connection.

An example of his being gentle was when a student asked for permission to skip part of a day in yeshiva to attend an out-of-town wedding. When Rabbi Kulefsky delayed a direct yes or no, the student asked, "So is it OK?" and was told, "I can't tell you whether it's OK for you to go. I have enough problems worrying about my Bitul Torah; I can't speak for yours."

Some of his teachings were encapsulated in "Chidushei Rav Kulefsky."

== Personal ==
Rabbi Kulefsky was a first born only son; he had 3 sisters. He and his wife of 53 years had two sons and three daughters.
