= Yochanan Zweig =

Rabbi Yochanan Zweig is the rosh yeshiva (dean) of Yeshiva V'Kollel Beis Moshe Chaim.

He was raised in Philadelphia. In 1974 he moved to Miami Beach and opened the Yeshiva V'Kollel Beis Moshe Chaim, Alfred and Sayde Swire College of Judaic Studies.
