= Yeshiva V'Kollel Beis Moshe Chaim =

School in Florida, United States

Coordinates: 25°48′43.4″N 80°8′10.3″W

Information
- Rosh yeshiva (dean): Yochanan Zweig

Yeshiva V'Kollel Beis Moshe Chaim is an Orthodox Jewish yeshiva in Miami Beach, Florida. Its rosh yeshiva (dean) is Yochanan Zweig.
