= Bachelor of Talmudic Law =

Bachelor law degree

The Bachelor of Talmudic Law (BTL), Bachelor of Talmudic Studies (BTS), or First Talmudic Degree (FTD), is a law degree, comprising the study, analysis and application of ancient Talmudical, Biblical, and other historical sources. The laws derived from these texts comprise the origin of many of today's judicial systems.

== Program content ==
Undergraduate programs conferring this degree involve studying the legal principles and concepts of Jewish Law, covering civil, criminal and matrimonial law. The course also includes the study of applicable tort, property and contract law. Furthermore, the program also covers legal jurisprudence, judicial systems – including the validity of witnesses and judges – and dispute resolution. A large part of the curriculum focuses on textual analysis, principles of logic, probability calculus, and critical reasoning. Many programs emphasize the cosmopolitan implications of the principal content areas, thus preparing graduates to assume leadership and professional positions in a wide array of professional and academic fields. Almost all the studied texts are in Aramaic or Hebrew, and the program requires a working knowledge of both languages to facilitate the understanding and examination of these sources. In some institutions, this degree is a prerequisite to the study for Semicha, Rabbinic Ordination. At accredited institutions this degree requires 120 credit hours of study.

=== Examples of case studies ===
An example of a specific case studied is that of an agricultural business with annual tax obligations, wanting to pay its tithe early, using estimation to evaluate the required amount. Legal discussion is based around the issue of interest charged if the amount proves too high, and extra benefit if the approximated figure falls below that for this year's crop. Obviously, such cases have clear parallels to those arising in the English legal system.

An additional illustration of the use these ancient concepts in modern-day use is the precedent in Haley v London Electricity Board, holding liable the owner of such holes or public dangers that may cause injury to unaware passers-by. In Jewish law this concept is known as “pits in public thoroughfares” and has wide-reaching tort implications.

== Accreditation and recognition ==
The Association of Advanced Rabbinical and Talmudic Schools (AARTS) and the Association of Institutions of Jewish Studies (AIJS) are specifically recognized to accredit Talmudic degrees.

In North America, five entities that accredit religious schools in particular are recognized by the United States Department of Education and four (excluding AIJS) by the Council for Higher Education Accreditation:

- Association for Biblical Higher Education (ABHE)
- Association of Advanced Rabbinical and Talmudic Schools (AARTS)
- Association of Institutions of Jewish Studies (AIJS)
- Association of Theological Schools in the United States and Canada (ATS)
- Transnational Association of Christian Colleges and Schools (TRACS)

Since all these accreditors meet United States Department of Education recognition criteria, and most the Council for Higher Education Accreditation as well, their standards correspond to those of regional accreditors. Contrary to the principles laid out by the Council for Higher Education Accreditation in Transfer and the Public Interest: A Statement to the Community, many regionally accredited institutions continue to base transfer credit decisions solely or primarily upon regional accreditation.

== See also ==
- List of rabbinical schools § Orthodox
- Master of Rabbinic Studies / Master of Talmudic Law
- Talmudic law
- Yeshiva § College credit
