= Machzikei Hadas (synagogue) =

Orthodox synagogue in Ottawa, Canada

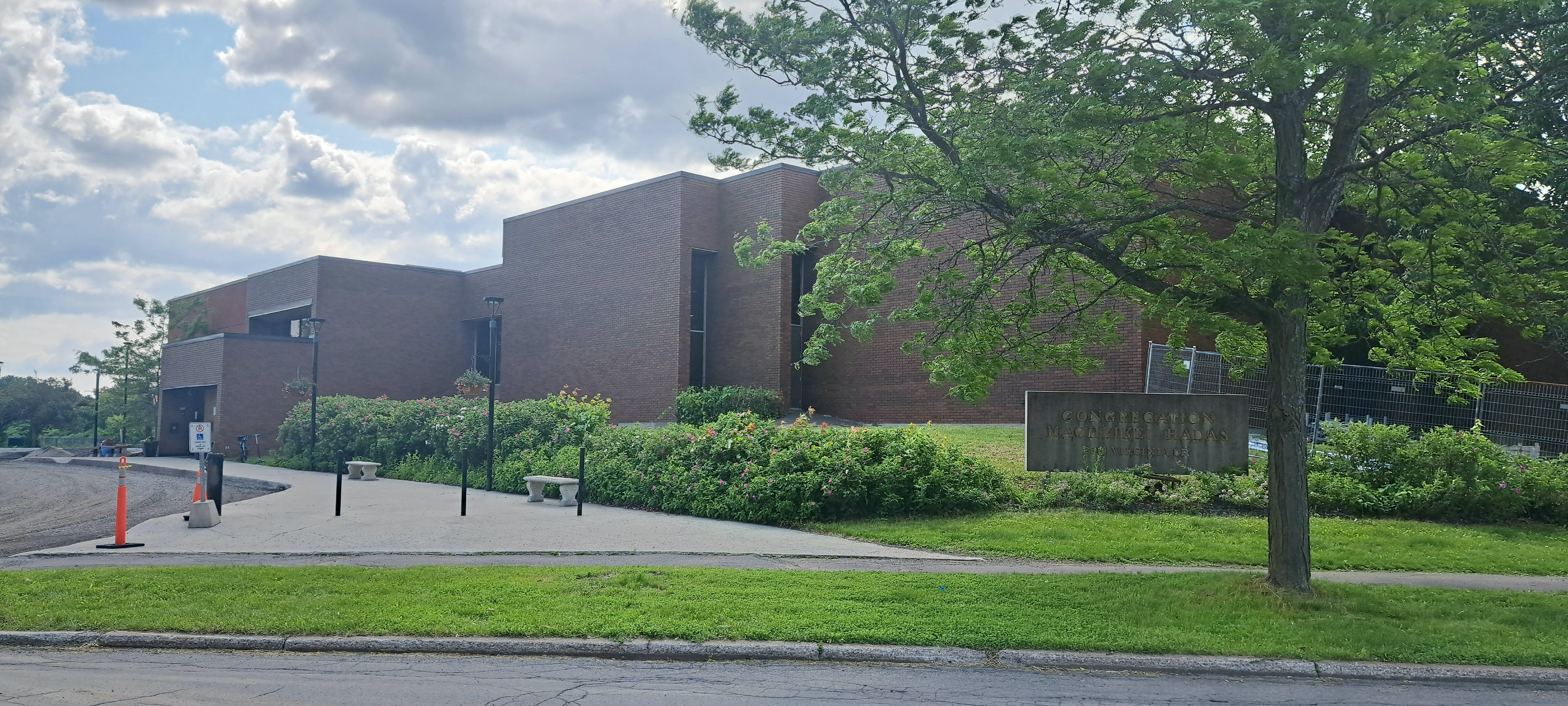

Religion
- Affiliation: Modern Orthodox Judaism
- Ecclesiastical or organisational status: Synagogue
- Leadership: Rabbi Idan Scher; Michael Goldstein (Executive Director)
- Year consecrated: 1985
- Status: Active

Location
- Location: 2310 Virginia Drive, Ottawa, Ontario K1H 6S2
- Interactive map of Machzikei Hadas
- Coordinates: 45.386192°N 75.645359°W

Architecture
- Architect: Werner Edgar Noffke
- Type: Synagogue
- Groundbreaking: 1926
- Completed: 1927

Website
- www.cmhottawa.com

Machzikei Hadas (literally translated from Hebrew as 'Supporters of the law') is a Modern Orthodox synagogue in Ottawa, Ontario, Canada. Congregation Machzikei Hadas, is open to all, regardless of level of observance. Machzikei Hadas is broadening its programming for young families in an attempt to boost membership.

== History ==
The Jewish population of Ottawa grew from 20 families in 1889 to approximately 5,500 in 1961. The Machzikei Hadas congregation first began Shabbat services in a home on St. Patrick Street owned by Mr and Mrs Goldberg in 1907, paying 25 cents per week dues. The congregation rented a hall at the corner of Dalhousie and St. Patrick Street for one month covering Rosh Hashanah and Yom Kippur, and charging $1.00. On May 12, 1908, the 264 Murray Street former premises of Adath Jeshurun Congregation and subsequent soda water factory of Michael Fine, was purchased for $1,800.00 by 15 to 20 families for their first permanent Machzikei Hadas synagogue. Henry Levine, tailor, Nathan Wolfe, tailor, Benjamin Natham(son), peddler, Max Friedman, shoemaker, Max Lachowitz, peddler and Abraham Apple(baum), carpenter. Leibel and Mendle Steinberg and Kseil and Abraham Applebaum worked on 264 Murray to transform it into a synagogue again. In 1923, the congregation purchased two homes owned by Oscar Petigrosky at the corner of King Edward and Murray Streets. The congregation met in various temporary locations until 1927. Werner Edgar Noffke (architect) designed the synagogue on King Edward Avenue at Murray Street, (1926–27). The synagogue at 259 Murray Street opened in 1929. Rev. Baker served as cantor from 1910 until his death in 1945. From 1909 until 1960, part-time rabbis served both the Machzikei Hadas and B'nai Jacob congregations. Rabbi Stanley Webber, who emphasized education, became the congregation's first full-time spiritual leader 1960–1962. Rabbi Abraham Rubin served the congregation from 1962 until 1967. The congregation affiliated with the Union of Orthodox Jewish Congregation in 1960. Dr. Reuven Bulka, who served as spiritual leader of Congregation Machzikei Hadas in Ottawa starting in 1967, and became rabbi emeritus in 2015, emphasized adult education, psychology, and Judaism. Rabbi Idan Scher was chosen to be next spiritual leader of Congregation Machzikei Hadas in 2014.

Machzikei Hadas relocated in 1973 to a newly designed synagogue on Virginia Drive in Alta Vista, extending services from 100 families in 1974 to 500 families in 1995. The congregation provided many youths, seniors, educational and public awareness programs. The congregation maintained an eruv, or private space and housed Clergy for a United Canada. In 1994, it was the first synagogue in the Commonwealth of Nations to be granted arms by the Canadian heraldic authority. Congregation Machzikei Hadas declined by about one-third over the past 15 years, said Jonah Rabinovitch, president of Ottawa's oldest Orthodox congregation to about 300 families.

The Machzikei Hadas Congregation was granted arms in 1994.

Machzikei Hadas recently completed a large $3 million renovation to update and modernize the building.

== Jewish Memorial Gardens ==
As of 1 July 2008, each of the Founding Members: Congregation Machzikei Hadas; Congregation Beth Shalom; Agudath Israel (Ottawa); the Jewish Reform Congregation Temple Israel (Ottawa); Young Israel of Ottawa; Congregation Beit Tikvah of Ottawa transferred to Jewish Memorial Gardens the cemetery lands that they had.

== Programming ==
Machzikei Hadas has provided for the community through youth, seniors, educational, and public awareness programs. The synagogue has hosted or co-hosted human rights day gatherings, an information evening for potential bone marrow transplant donors, and All-Candidates meetings. The synagogue launched and maintains the community Eruv. In the period leading up to the referendum, Congregation Machzikei Hadas served as the base for Clergy for a United Canada, which amassed 6,000 signatures from clergy across Canada calling on Canada to remain together.

== Machzikei Hadas – name ==
The name is derived from the eponymous umbrella organisation that was conceived by the then Rebbe of Belz, Rabbi Joshua Rokeach who was a son of Rabbi Shalom Rokeach of Belz in Galicia, Eastern Poland. Its first leader was a founding member of this august Rabbinic council, Rabbi Shimon Sofer, Chief Rabbi of Krakow. After being decimated by wars (World War I & World War II), it was built anew in Israel by the present Rebbe of Belz, Yissachar Dov Rokeach. People who emigrated from Poland started synagogues wherever they arrived and named them "Machzikei Hadas", after the organised community life they left behind in their home towns. The name was also used for the new movement's mouthpiece "Kol Machzike Hadas", which appeared until the outbreak of World War I.

There are several other Orthodox synagogues around the world with the same name including the Spitalfields Great Synagogue in London, Antwerp, Brussels, Edgware, Manchester, New York City, Copenhagen, Machzikei Hadas – Young Israel of Scranton, Pennsylvania, and Ottawa, some of which are part of an Orthodox congregation, like the Orthodox congregation in Geneva, which also carries this name.
