= Yissocher Frand =

American Orthodox rabbi

Frand in 2007

Yissocher Frand is an American Orthodox rabbi and author. He is a senior lecturer at Yeshivas Ner Yisroel in Baltimore, Maryland. Raised in Seattle, Washington, he attended Ner Yisroel as a student and progressed to become a maggid shiur. His father, Mr. David Frand, ended up in the United States when they took him in when he was running away from Frankfort in 1939. He is well known within the Orthodox Jewish community as a skilled orator, and has given thousands of invited lectures over the past decades, of which he produces Torah Tapes.

== Career ==
Frand is best known for his popular parsha shiurim. His weekly lectures, started in the late 1980s, are hosted live at the Agudath Yisrael synagogue in Baltimore, and are broadcast all over the world by the Torah Conferencing Network in synagogues or Jewish community centers in over 70 cities in North America, Europe, Israel, South Africa, and Australia. The wide distribution of his lectures make them one of the best-attended Jewish lectures in the world. Building on points from the weekly Torah reading, his lectures generally follow a particular style. He typically addresses a matter of halakha for the bulk of his lecture, while reserving the closing portion for a midrashic talk which evinces an ethical or religious character. The Yad Yechiel Institute was founded to distribute audio recordings of Rabbi Frand's lectures, and they are sold over the Internet and in Jewish bookstores everywhere. Project Genesis publishes the midrashic portions of his weekly talks online, and the distribution of these transcriptions via email have added to his popularity. Revised versions of these shiurim have been collected and republished in book form. Rabbi Frand also gives a popular yearly lecture before Yom Kippur known as his annual "Teshuva Drasha."

He is a board member and frequent speaker on behalf of the Chofetz Chaim Heritage Foundation, an organization dedicated to educating the Jewish public on the laws of lashon hara. Frand has also been a featured speaker multiple times at the Siyum HaShas.

== Bibliography ==
- Rabbi Yissocher Frand in print: Contemporary and classic issues through the prism of Torah, Artscroll, September 1995. ISBN 0-89906-631-3
- Listen to Your Messages: And Other Observations on Contemporary Jewish Life, Artscroll, August 1999. ISBN 1-57819-140-8
- An Offer You can't Refuse: and other essays on the art of living, Artscroll, January 2004. ISBN 1-57819-438-5
- Rabbi Frand on the Parashah: Insights, stories and observations ... on the weekly Torah reading, Artscroll, 2001. ISBN 1-57819-594-2
- Oholei Yissocher (Printed in Hebrew): Insights on Tractates Moed Katan and Temurah, Self-Published, 1986
- Rabbi Frand On the Parashah volume 2: More insights, stories and observations by Rabbi Yissocher Frand on the weekly Torah reading Artscroll, 2007. ISBN 1-4226-0570-1
