= Talmudic law =

Judaic religious law

Talmudic law is the law that is derived from the Talmud based on the teachings of the Talmudic Sages.

- See Talmud or Talmudical Hermeneutics for more information.
