= Yaakov Yitzchok Ruderman =

American rabbi (1900–1987)

Rabbi Yaakov Yitzchak Ruderman יעקב יצחק רודרמאן
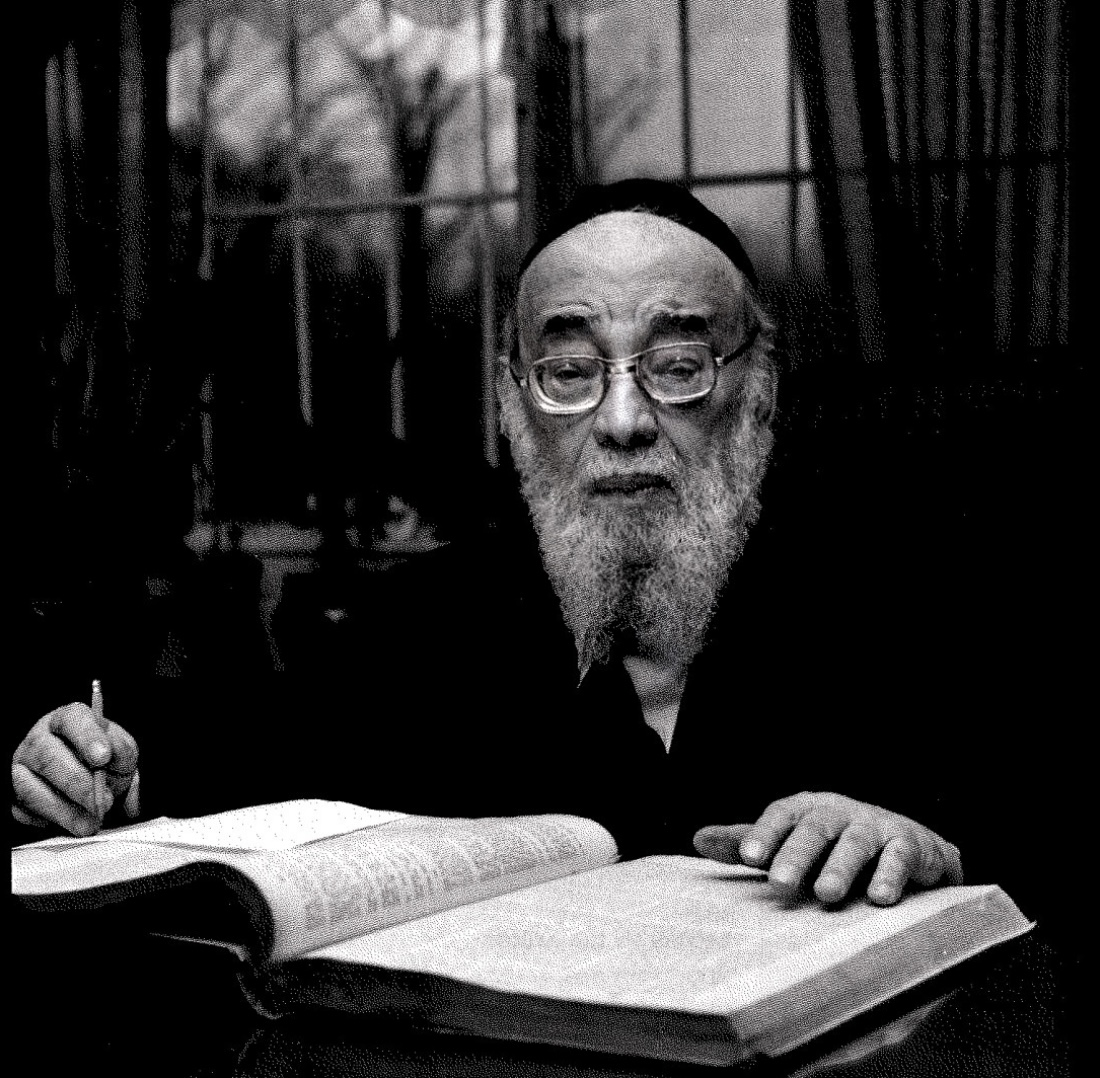

Personal life
- Born: March 16, 1900 Dawhinava, Russian Empire (now Belarus)
- Died: July 11, 1987 (aged 87) Baltimore, Maryland, U.S.
- Buried: Arbutus, MD 39.241523°N 76.673917°W
- Spouse: Golda Feiga (née Kramer)
- Children: 1
- Education: Slabodka Yeshiva, Lithuania

Religious life
- Religion: Judaism
- Denomination: Orthodox Judaism

Jewish leader
- Successor: Rabbi Shmuel Yaakov Weinberg
- Position: Rosh yeshiva
- Yeshiva: Ner Yisroel
- Began: 1933
- Ended: 1987
- Main work: Avodas Levi
- Yahrtzeit: 14 Tammuz
- Semikhah: Rav Moshe Mordechai Epstein

Yaakov Yitzchok Ruderman (1900 – July 11, 1987) was a Russian-born American Talmudic scholar and rabbi who founded and served as rosh yeshiva of Yeshivas Ner Yisroel in Baltimore.

== Early life ==
Ruderman was born into a Hasidic family of the Chabad denomination in Dawhinava, in the Vilna Governorate of the Russian Empire (present-day Belarus), where his father, Rabbi Yehuda Leib Ruderman, was the community's rabbi. He studied at Yeshivas Knesses Yisrael in Slabodka, under the "Alter Rebbe", Rabbi Nosson Tzvi Finkel, and the rosh yeshiva, Rabbi Moshe Mordechai Epstein, receiving rabbinic ordination from the latter in 1926.

During World War I, the Russian military authorities decided that Jews could not live close to the Kovno fortress, and they were forcibly expelled from Slabodka. Within this measure, a large number of rabbis and yeshiva students were forcibly enlisted in the Tsarist Russian army. To avoid conscription, the yeshiva scattered its educators and students away within the Russian Empire, with many relocating to Minsk, where a large and established Jewish community existed. As the front lines of German-Russian fighting approached Minsk, however, this group split into two. Ruderman joined a group that included the Alter of Slabodka, Rabbi Moshe Mordechai Epstein, and Rabbi Avraham Grodzinski, which went to Kremenchug in the Poltava Province.

While in Kremenchug, a group of gentiles abducted Rabbi Ruderman for ransom, holding him at gunpoint and demanding 10,000 rubles for his life. They took him to the home of the rosh yeshiva, Rabbi Moshe Mordechai Epstein, who had no money. As the kidnappers were about to kill Rabbi Ruderman, Rabbi Epstein ran outside, shouting to attract a crowd. Seeing a large group gathering, the kidnappers realized they had little chance of success and released Rabbi Ruderman unharmed. This was a story he often recounted for students at Ner Yisroel, years later.

== Career ==
In 1924 Ruderman married Faiga Kramer from a rabbinical family. In 1926 he received his semikhah (rabbinical ordination).

In 1930, he joined his father-in-law, Rabbi Sheftel Kramer, at his yeshiva in New Haven, Connecticut. In 1931, the Ruderman family moved to Cleveland, Ohio, along with the rest of the New Haven Yeshiva, where he continued to serve as one of its teachers.

=== Building Torah Institutions in America ===
In 1933, with his father-in-law's encouragement, Ruderman moved to Baltimore, where he was immediately offered a rabbinical post at the Tiferes Yisroel Shul. Ruderman accepted the position on the condition that he be permitted to open a yeshiva using the synagogue's facilities. He began with six students and named the newly formed yeshiva Ner Yisroel (after Rabbi Yisrael Lipkin Salanter, the founder of the mussar movement).

The yeshiva grew quickly, and Ruderman approached the renowned Rabbi Shimon Schwab, at the time rabbi of another Baltimore congregation, and invited him to join the faculty. Rabbi Schwab taught the first-year shiur (class) in Ner Israel for several years, until he moved to Washington Heights.

When Ruderman grew old, he became legally blind but could still read by holding a book within inches of his eyes while wearing thick glasses. He still held a siddur when davening.

Ruderman led the yeshiva for 54 years until his death. After which Rabbi Shmuel Yaakov Weinberg, his son-in-law, took over. Ruderman was the rosh yeshiva, while his brother-in-law, Rabbi Naftoli (Herman) Neuberger, managed the yeshiva's financial affairts. Together, they built it into one of the largest yeshivas in America, producing thousands of rabbis, educators and learned laymen.

Ruderman was also involved in many aspects of Jewish communal life outside of the Yeshiva. He was a member of the Council of Torah Sages of Agudath Israel and the chairman of the Rabbinic Advisory Board of Torah Umesorah.

=== Works ===
Around 1926, Ruderman published his only written work, Avodas Levi, which was republished in 1930. The book is a compilation of Rabbi Ruderman's commentaries on the weekly Torah portion, Jewish festivals, and eulogies he gave for various Torah sages. The Sefer Avodath Levi Project to preserve his legacy has been in progress. Posthumously, his students have published several volumes of his teachings: ethical insights based on the weekly parsha named Sichos Levi, later re-written and republished as Sichos Avodas Levi, lectures on the 19th century work Minchas Chinuch and other Talmudic and halachic insights in Mas'as Levi, and lectures on Sukkah, Kiddushin, Yevamos, Kesubos, Bava Kamma, and Bava Metzia, as Shiurei Avodas Levi.

== Death ==
Ruderman's death on July 11, 1987, the 14th of Tammuz, followed less than 18 months after the deaths of Rabbis Yaakov Kaminetsky and Moshe Feinstein. Ruderman was one of the last surviving roshei yeshiva who came to America from Lithuania early in the 20th century.

His son-in-law, Rabbi Weinberg, who married his only child, Chana, succeeded him as rosh yeshiva of Ner Yisroel until Rabbi Weinberg's death in 1999. Weinberg's wife, Chana, died on January 23, 2012.

Ruderman was buried in Baltimore's United Hebrew Cemetery.
