= Maggid shiur =

Rabbi that lectures in a yeshiva or kollel

A maggid shiur (Hebrew: מגיד שיעור, romanized: maggiḏ shiʿur, lit. 'teller of a shiur or Torah lecture') is the rabbi that lectures in a yeshiva or kollel. He usually lectures in one place, on a given topic, generally on advanced and in-depth Talmudic studies, on a fixed schedule.

Elazar Shach told a future maggid shiur that the key to successful lectures is "knowing how to ask the initial questions that comprise the shiur."

== Contrasting chavrusa with maggid shiur ==
While the chavrusa (study partner) system requires more commitment and participant preparation, a maggid shiur generally has more experience, and ideally "points out details" that both partners "never knew."

To succeed, both need "well defined goals."
