= Elya Svei =

Lithuanian-born American Haredi rabbi, educator, and Talmudic scholar (1924–2009)

Elya Svei אליה סווי
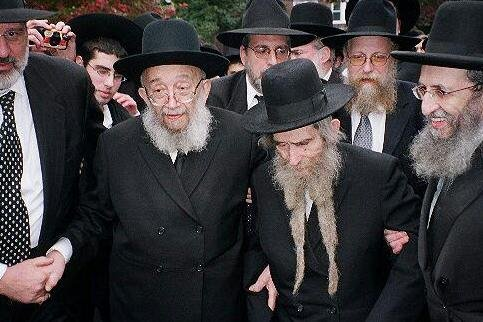
- Elya Svei (left) with Aharon Yehuda Leib Shteinman and Shmuel Kamenetsky in 1997

Personal life
- Born: Eliyahu Svei; March 19, 1924 Kaunas, Lithuania
- Died: March 26, 2009 (aged 85) Philadelphia, Pennsylvania, United States
- Buried: Jerusalem

Religious life
- Religion: Judaism

Elya Svei (Hebrew: אליה סווי; March 19, 1924 (Taanis Esther 5684) – March 26, 2009 (Rosh Chodesh Nisan 5769)) was an American Haredi Jewish rabbi and co-rosh yeshiva (with Shmuel Kamenetsky) of the Talmudical Yeshiva of Philadelphia. He was born in Kaunas and died in Philadelphia.

== Biography ==
Elya Svei was born in Kaunas, Lithuania, where his father Shmuel Leib Svei was a rabbi. When he was nine years old, he moved to the United States to join his father, who was fundraising there. In the United States he attended Yeshiva Torah Vodaath, graduating its Hebrew Parochial High School division in 1941.

Svei was a student of Aharon Kotler. He was a member of the Moetzes Gedolei HaTorah and chairman of the Rabbinic Administrative Board of Torah Umesorah until he resigned from both in June 2002, reportedly due to an ideological dispute with his colleagues.

Svei was a founder of Sinai Academy in Brooklyn, a middle school and high school catering to the children of primarily non-observant Russian Jewish immigrants.

His daughter, Lakee Gorelick, is married to Rabbi Isser Gorelick, who is a Rebbi in the Yeshiva Gedolah Zichron Moshe in South Fallsburg, and is the son of the Yeshiva's founder Rabbi Yerucham Gorelick.
