= Shmuel Kamenetsky =

American Haredi rabbi (born 1924)

Rabbi Shmuel Kamenetsky
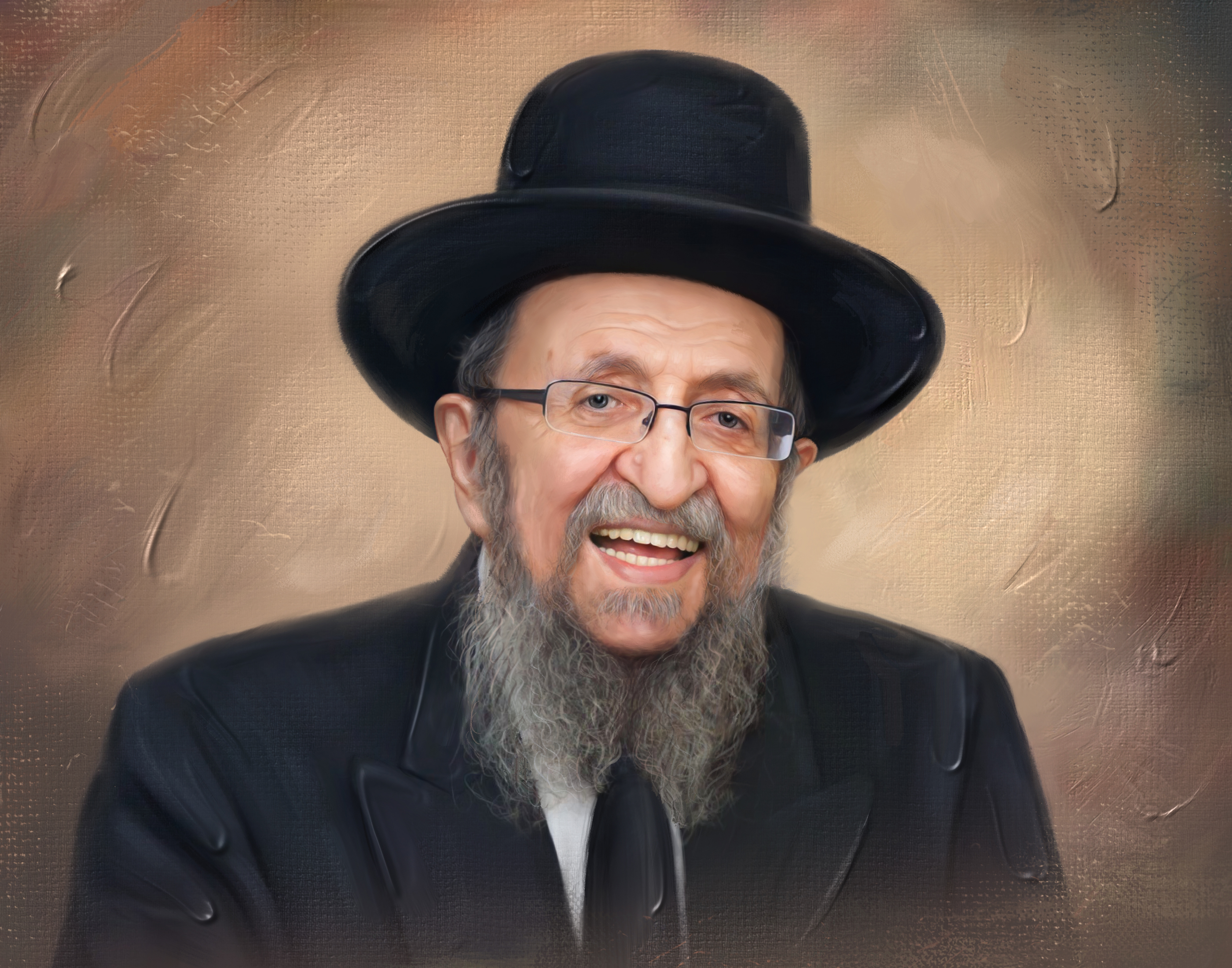

Personal life
- Born: 1924 (age 101–102) Tytuvėnai, Lithuania
- Spouse: Temi Brooks (died 2022)
- Children: 11
- Parent(s): Yaakov Kamenetsky and Ettil Kamenetsky
- Education: Beth Medrash Govoha, Ner Israel Rabbinical College
- Occupation: Rosh yeshiva

Religious life
- Religion: Judaism
- Denomination: Orthodox

Jewish leader
- Position: Rosh yeshiva
- Yeshiva: Talmudical Yeshiva of Philadelphia
- Residence: Philadelphia, Pennsylvania

Shmuel Kamenetsky (born 1924) is an American Haredi rabbi. He is the co-founder and rosh yeshiva of the Talmudical Yeshiva of Philadelphia. He is also a member of the Moetzes Gedolei HaTorah.

== Early life ==
Kamenetsky was born in Tytuvėnai, Lithuania to Yaakov Kamenetsky, the town's rabbi. After the family's emigration to Canada in 1938, he attended Eitz Chaim Day Schools in Toronto, then studied at Ner Israel Rabbinical College under his father's cousin, Yaakov Yitzchok Ruderman. He went on to study at Lakewood Yeshiva, becoming a primary student of Aharon Kotler, from whom he received rabbinic ordination.

== Career ==
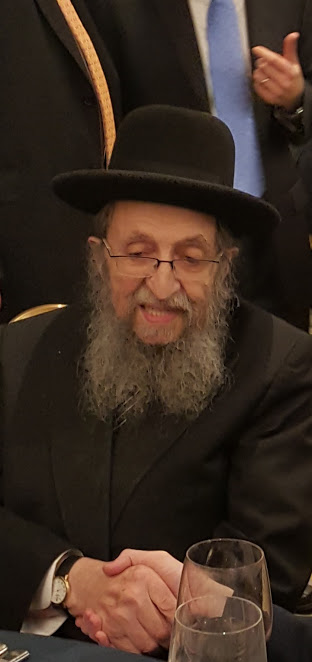
Kamenetsky in 2016

In the mid-1950s, Kotler's colleague Nosson Meir Wachtfogel asked Kamenetsky to help establish a yeshiva in Philadelphia, the Talmudical Yeshiva of Philadelphia in the Strawberry Mansion neighborhood. In 1956 Schwartzman left to open his own yeshiva in Israel, and Kamenetsky chose Elya Svei as co-rosh yeshiva. This arrangement continued until Svei's death in March 2009.

Kamenetsky is a member of the Moetzes Gedolei HaTorah of Agudath Israel of America and serves on the rabbinical board of organizations including Chinuch Atzmai (Torah Schools for Israel), Torah Umesorah, the Chofetz Chaim Heritage Foundation, and the Association for Jewish Outreach Professionals.

== Opinions ==
Kamenetsky's opinion is frequently sought and quoted on current issues such as same-sex attraction, child molestation, obesity and dieting, smoking, and drinking alcohol to excess on Purim.

Kamenetsky and his wife Temi believe that vaccines are more harmful than the diseases they prevent. He said, "I see vaccinations as the problem. It's a hoax. Even the Salk vaccine is a hoax. It is just big business". He has supported the idea that a child cannot be refused entry into a school for refusing to vaccinate. During the COVID-19 pandemic, Kamenetsky denied that he ever instructed anyone to refuse to take the vaccine, stating that a letter publicized to this effect was a forgery. In a rebuttal letter, he stated his opinion that each individual should ask his own doctor.

In July 2020, Kamenetsky endorsed the Donald Trump 2020 presidential campaign, stating "Yes, I think people should vote for him. He’s done a good job. It’s hakaras hatov."

== Personal life ==
Kamenetsky's wife, Temi, was the daughter of cantor Mordechai and Charna Reizel Brooks. Born c.1929, she grew up in Brooklyn, New York, and died on January 10, 2022. They had 11 children. Kamenetsky's son Sholom serves as a rosh yeshiva at the yeshiva, his son Avraham is a teacher at Yeshivas Beis Yisroel in Jerusalem, his son Zev is a teacher in Belmar Yeshiva, his son Dovid is a teacher in Darkei Noam Yeshiva and was an editor of the Schottenstein Talmud published by ArtScroll.

In 2023, Kamenetsky was hospitalized after suffering a stroke. After being released to a rehabilitation facility, he developed pneumonia and was re-hospitalized. He was hospitalized several times in 2025 and in July 2025, he was admitted into the intensive care unit and went into septic shock before improving and being released.
