= Manhattan Day School =

Jewish school in Manhattan, New York, United States

Coordinates: 40°46′55.3″N 73°59′3.01″W

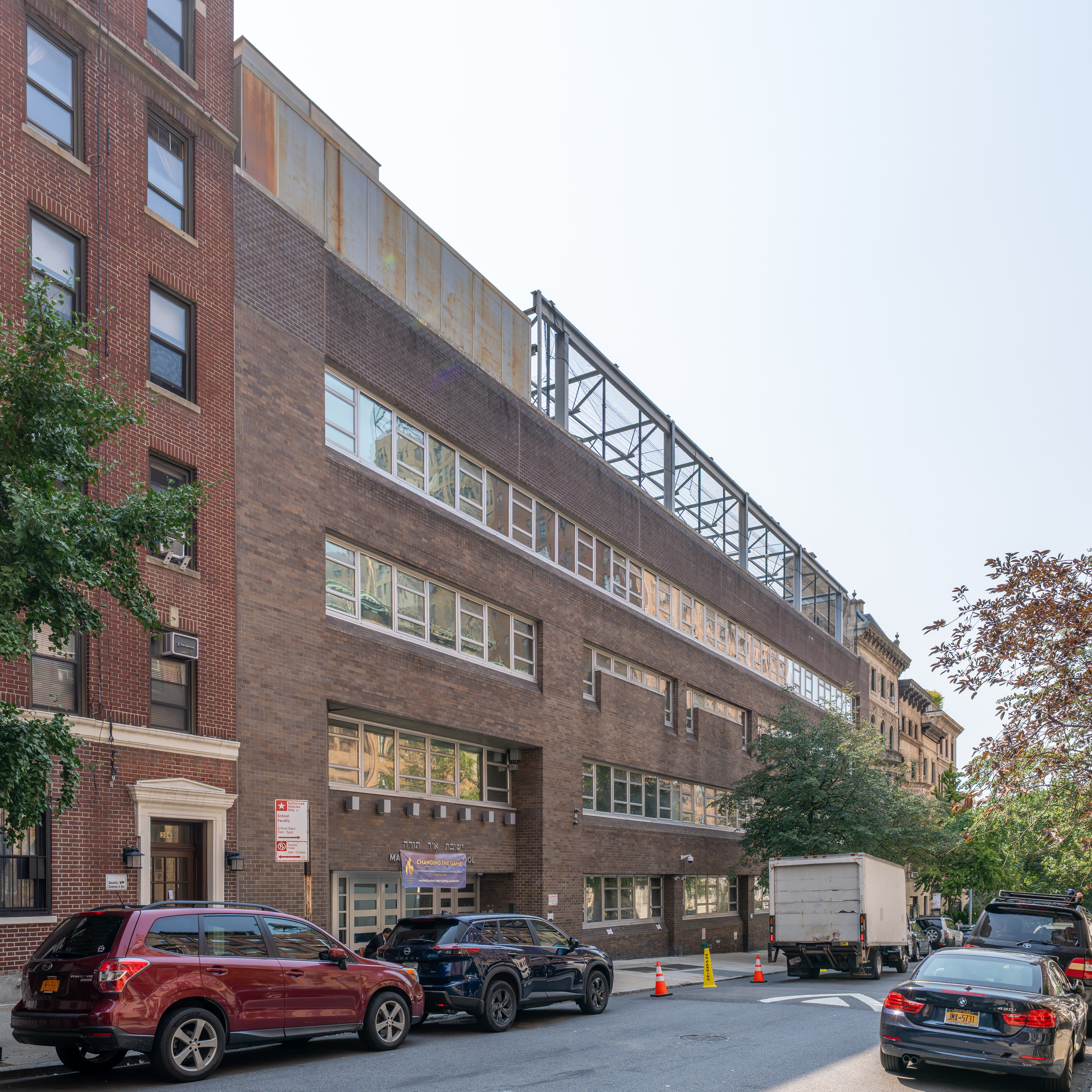
(2026)

Manhattan Day School, often referred to as MDS, is a co-educational Modern Orthodox Jewish yeshiva elementary school located on the Upper West Side of Manhattan. It was founded in 1943 as Yeshivat Ohr Torah Community School, the first Jewish all-day independent school on the West Side of Manhattan. The rabbis and congregants of Congregation Ohab Zedek and The Jewish Center helped Dr. Joseph Kaminetsky to found the school, who served as its first Executive Director before being recruited by Rabbi Shraga Feivel Mendlowitz to work at Torah Umesorah. Shlomo Riskin served as dean of the school at a later time.

Manhattan Day School consists of an Early Childhood (Two year olds - Kindergarten), Lower School (1st - 5th grade) and Middle School (6th - 8th grade). Ms. Raizi Chechik became Head of School in 2017. The school is a not-for-profit organization.

== After-school programming and athletics ==
At Manhattan Day School children can participate in the After School program on the school premises. Starting from Nursery 3 through 8th Grade, children can join extracurricular activities in addition to their coursework. The after-school program options include karate, ballet, songwriting, dance, art, robotics, chess, cooking, and E2K.

The MDS Blazers is the name carried by the sports teams that play for MDS Middle School. MDS has Basketball, Football, Robotics, and now soccer teams.

== Israel advocacy ==
MDS has a comprehensive program of Israel advocacy training called Stand With Israel. Students choose a topic to research and present to various influencers and organizations to show their support for Israel. The MDS Stand With Israel team has presented to the Upper West Side community, Alan Dershowitz, the United Nations, and at the Museum for Jewish Heritage and has partnered with Stand With Us, AIPAC and NORPAC, among other organizations.

== Notable alumni ==
- Leonard Stern
- Joseph Berger
