= Fasman Yeshiva High School =

High school and yeshiva located in Skokie, Illinois

- מתיבתא דבית המדרש לתורה על שם הרב אשר צפתמאן זצ"ל

Location
- 7135 North Carpenter Road; Skokie, Cook County, Illinois 60077; United States; 42°0′39.91″N 87°45′41.25″W

Information
- Motto: Preparing Bnei Torah for life
- Established: 1921
- Principal: Aharon Leibtag
- Grades: 9-12
- Language: English, Hebrew
- Campus: Max and Rose Cohen Campus
- Colors: Blue and white
- Athletics conference: Chicago Prep Conference
- Nickname: The Yeshiva
- Team name: The Yeshiva
- Feeder schools: Arie Crown Hebrew Day School
- Affiliation: Hebrew Theological College, Touro University
- Website: www.fyhs.org

Fasman Yeshiva High School, known colloquially as Skokie Yeshiva, is an Orthodox Jewish all-boys high school in Skokie, Illinois. Fasman Yeshiva offers a dual curriculum of secular and Judaic studies.

As of the 2019–20 school year, the school had an enrollment of 124 students and 21.5 classroom teachers (on an FTE basis), for a student–teacher ratio of 5.8:1. The school's student body was 99.2% (123) White and 0.8% (1) Hispanic.

== Facilities ==
Fasman Yeshiva High School is located on a 13-acre (53,000 m^{2}) campus shared with Hebrew Theological College and Hillel Torah North Suburban Day School. The Administration Building (built 1954) includes a dining hall, auditorium, "the 2nd floor", library, dormitory and classrooms. The science laboratory, music room and game room are also in this building. The Beis Midrash building (built 1957) includes a large study hall as well as additional classrooms, an auditorium, and a fitness room. Recently, Rothner Family Gymnasium was built to serve as the home to the Varsity and Junior Varsity Basketball teams as well as being a facility available to students throughout the day. Sports facilities include the Rothner Family Gymnasium, a full-size outdoor basketball court, softball field, and a soccer field.

== Academics ==
=== General Studies Department ===
FYHS's general education program includes Advanced Placement college-level courses in biology, calculus, US Government and Politics, U.S. history, Physics, and English. However, certain Advanced Placement offerings vary from year to year, As of the 2020-2021 school year, there are eleven advanced placement classes that are offered. Students are required to take a minimum of two years of modern, conversational Hebrew.

=== Torah Studies Department ===
Fasman Yeshiva High School's Torah studies curriculum includes a preparatory shiur, which is designed to assist students with limited exposure to Talmud to develop their basic skills, in addition to three levels of Jewish studies( freshmen and junior classes only have two levels) classes per grade. Each Jewish studies teacher teaches his students Talmud, Jewish Law and Hebrew Bible. Additionally, many students are enrolled in a variety of optional Jewish studies classes after school hours.

== Sports ==
Fasman Yeshiva High School competes in Basketball, Soccer and Baseball interscholastically. Until the 2010-11 school year, the school had been a member of the Metro Prep Conference, but in 2025 joined the Chicago Prep Conference and now competes in the state tournament sponsored by the Illinois High School Association.

There are multiple intramural leagues including basketball, baseball, football, and chess.

== Notable alumni ==
- David Draiman, songwriter and vocalist for band Disturbed as well as Device
- Rabbi David Hirsch, Rosh Yeshiva of Rabbi Isaac Elchanan Theological Seminary, an affiliate of Yeshiva University
- Rabbi Dovid Kaplan, author and senior lecturer at Ohr Somayach, Jerusalem
- Rabbi Rapha Margolies, rebbe at Yeshivas Sha'alvim
- David Steinberg, comedian, actor, director, writer, and producer
- Rabbi Berel Wein, Jewish historian and scholar
- Doni Garden, Lawyer for Legacy Healthcare
- Rabbi Zvi Zimmerman, author of the Talmud Treasury

== See also ==
- History of the Jews in Chicago
- Menora v. Illinois High School Association, court case on religious freedom involving FYHS
