= Rivoli Theatre (South Fallsburg, New York) =

- U.S. National Register of Historic Places
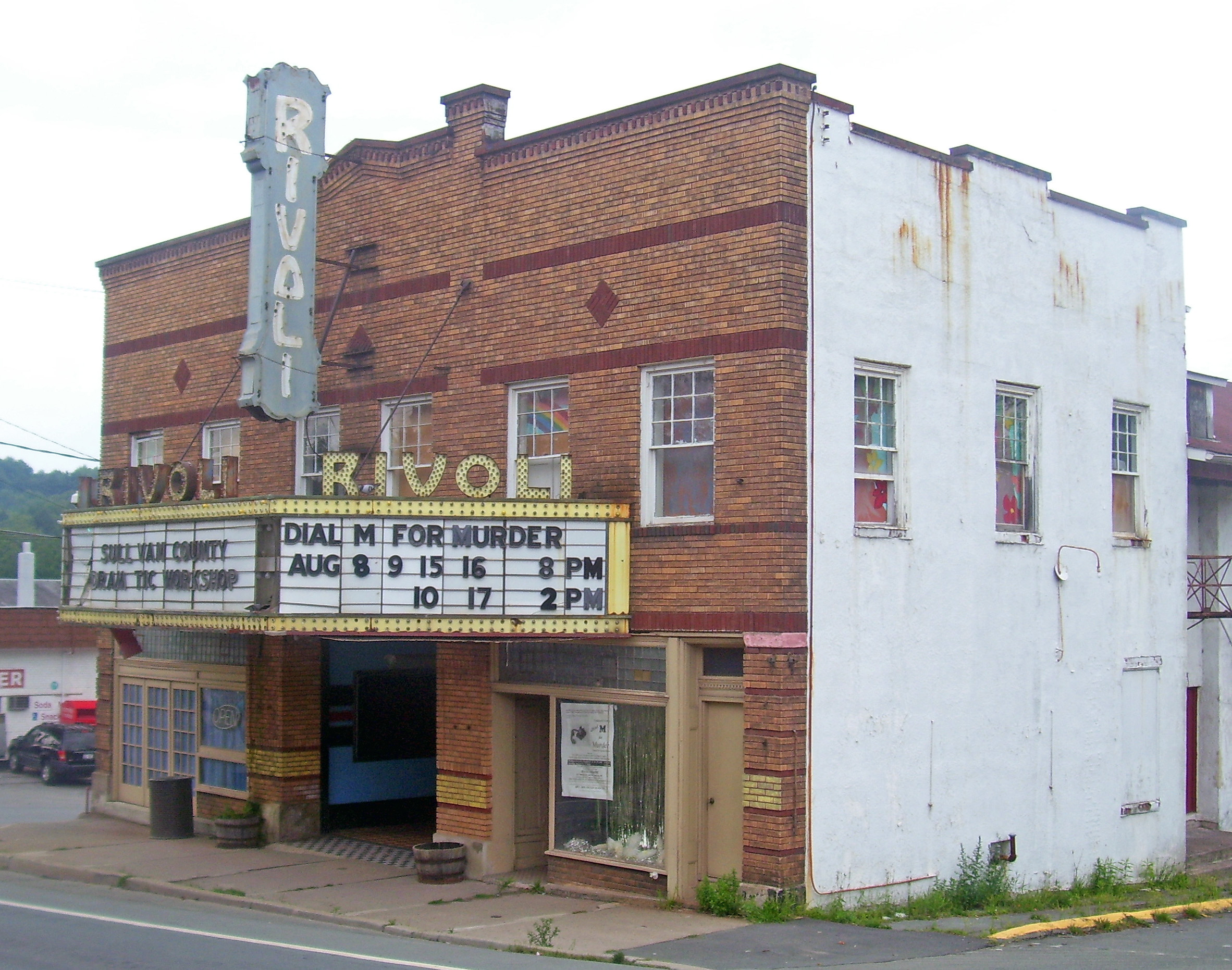
- West elevation and north profile of front block, 2008

- Location within New York Location within the United States
- Location: South Fallsburg, NY
- Nearest city: Middletown
- Coordinates: 41°41′56″N 74°38′15″W
- Area: less than one acre
- Built: 1923
- Architect: Emil Motel
- Architectural style: Late 19th And 20th Century Revivals
- NRHP reference No.: 00001691
- Added to NRHP: January 26, 2001

The Rivoli Theatre in South Fallsburg, New York, United States is located at the intersection of NY 42 and Laurel Avenue. It was built in 1923, renovated in the late 1930s and remains almost intact from that period.

It was a major local source of entertainment, both live and filmed, in the area during the peak years of the Jewish summer resorts in that region of the Catskills. Today a community theatre program continues to put on plays there every summer. In 2001 it was listed on the National Register of Historic Places. On July 6, 2012, the Rivoli Theatre once again began running movies. Using a Christie 35-mm projector and platter system, the Sullivan County Dramatic Workshop, Inc. (owners of the Rivoli Theatre) continued the film tradition. The first movie exhibited was Madagascar 3: Europe's Most Wanted.

== Building ==
The theater building consists of two separate sections: a six-by-three-bay front with the foyer and lobby, and a one-story, seven-bay auditorium. It is built of concrete block, faced in buff brick with red coursing and trim. The side and rear are parged with brick piers dividing the bays. The front of the roof is behind a parapet; the rear is gabled. Both roof sections are shingled in asphalt.

=== Marquee ===
The front marquee is a three-sided neon sign supported by chains, augmented by a vertical neon sign on the front. The 1923 marquee was a simple iron canopy with decorative metal cresting and opaque glass tiles. In 1937, this was replaced (or concealed) by a square neon sign with an elaborate decorative crest. The current marquee is a 3 sided sign dating to the 1950s. All three signs were carried by metal chains, the contemporary ones may be the originals.

=== Lobby and foyer ===
The lobby and foyer are in their original size and shape but have been refinished in newer materials.

The recessed entrance also reflects two construction phases. The original ticket booth was rectangular and projected a considerable distance into the foyer. It was of wood construction and embellished with opaque glass tiles. The entrance doors were of multi-pane glass and the walls were divided into panels, some doubling as poster frames. The 1937 foyer, which is intact today has a tiled floor and enameled and chrome siding.

=== Auditorium ===
The auditorium was constructed in two stages. The original space was 124 feet long and its decorative scheme is unknown. In 1937, a 36-foot addition was added to the rear accommodating six additional rows and a stage. At the same time, the auditorium was completely redecorated in the Art Deco style. The 1937 scheme for the auditorium is completely intact.

The 160-foot (49 m) auditorium is still in its original Art Deco style. Its flat ceiling and coved walls are covered in asbestos paneling done in various patterns of geometric shapes. A large original light fixture is at the center of every wall panel. A new automatic movie screen was installed in June 2012.

=== Second floor ===
The second floor is used for prop storage, costume rooms and a projector room. The rest of the second floor is being renovated to be used as rehearsal rooms. Finishes there are mostly intact.

== History ==
Beginning at the turn of the century, South Fallsburg saw heavy Jewish immigration. Many of the newcomers had come to a local resort during the summertime and decided to stay year-round and open or operate an existing one themselves, catering to their co-religionists. By the early 1920s the hamlet was overwhelmingly Jewish, with the local South Fallsburg Hebrew Association Synagogue expanding drastically and meeting every week to admit new members.

The original building on the Rivoli site was built in 1910. This building's original foundation is under the north-east corner of the present Rivoli.

Israel Kaplan and his son Arch opened the Rivoli to provide entertainment for summer vacationers in 1923. They are credited as designers, but the similarities to Emil Motel's Rialto Theatre in nearby Monticello suggest that Motel, who is credited with the Rivoli's later redesign, was the original architect of the Rivoli as well.

The Rivoli was a success, showing both movies and live stage productions. In 1937 the Kaplans had the theater expanded to accommodate 600 and remodeled in the then-current Art Deco style. Motl was in charge of the expansion. Its prosperity continued throughout the Catskill resort era, where the live-entertainment Borscht Belt nurtured many future stars. Former patrons remember frequent lines around the corner.

At the end of 1997, Alice Rosenshein Manzi, a descendant of the Kaplans who had been renting the theater out as a fruit stand to make ends meet, closed the theater. The Sullivan County Dramatic Workshop, a local community theater group that had been looking for a new home, bought it for $55,000 and remodeled it for use as a theater again. The following year the interior was repainted and a new heating and cooling system added. They put on movies and plays each summer, and a local music promoter has also staged shows there. In 2011 the troupe began raising the matching funds for a state grant to restore the marquee.

Before forming Kiss, Gene Simmons and Paul Stanley played the Rivoli in the early 1970s with their band Wicked Lester/Rainbow.

The Rivoli was purchased in 1998 by the Sullivan County Dramatic Workshop. Seats were removed to accommodate a larger stage, and new heating and cooling systems were installed. In recent years a sound and lighting booth was constructed along with dressing rooms and additional rest rooms.

On July 6, 2012, the Rivoli Theatre once again began running movies. Using a Christie 35-mm projector and platter system, the Sullivan County Dramatic Workshop, Inc., which now owns the Rivoli Theatre, continued the tradition of film. The first movie exhibited was "Madagascar 3: Europe's Most Wanted".

== See also ==
- National Register of Historic Places listings in Sullivan County, New York
