= Sinai Academy =

Coordinates: 40.60818°N 73.99331°W

Sinai Academy Junior High and High School

Location
- 2025 79th Street; Brooklyn, New York; United States

Information
- Type: Private secondary
- Established: 1987
- Founder: Rabbi Aryeh Katzin
- Grades: 6–12
- Affiliation: Orthodox Jewish

Sinai Academy is an Orthodox Jewish private junior high and high school currently located in the Bensonhurst section of Brooklyn, New York, whose students used to be primarily children of immigrants from the former Soviet Union kavkazi jews and jews from uzbekistan called bukharian jews, the Sephardic community, the Russian community and other members of the Jewish community. It was founded in 1987 during the years of peak immigration of Jewish refugees from the Soviet Union by Aryeh Katzin with the support of leading Orthodox rabbis in the United States, especially that of Rabbi Elya Svei of the Talmudical Yeshiva of Philadelphia.

In 1992, Leonid Reyzin was awarded 4th place in the Intel Science Talent Search (formerly Westinghouse Science Talent Search).

== Academics ==
Sinai Academy is a dual-curriculum school: first three classes of each day are in Hebrew / Judaic studies followed by five classes of general studies. Sinai Academy offers a number of AP Classes such as Calculus AB, Economics (Macro and Micro), European History, Psychology, Language and Composition. They offer several extracurricular clubs including a film club, a debate club, and occasionally partakes in the New York model UN conference.
