= Yerucham Gorelick =

Rabbi Yerucham Gorelick
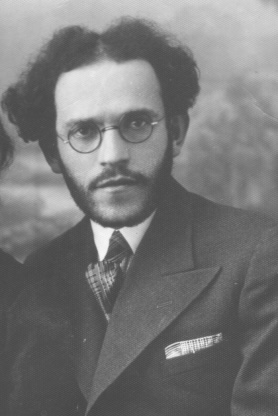

Personal life
- Born: 1911 Slutsk
- Died: 3 Tishrei 5744; September 20, 1983 New York
- Buried: Har Hamenuchot, Jerusalem

Religious life
- Religion: Judaism
- Denomination: Orthodox
- Yeshiva: RIETS
- Position: Rosh Yeshiva

Yerucham Gorelick (1911 – September 20, 1983) was a distinguished Rosh yeshiva in the Rabbi Isaac Elchanan Theological Seminary (RIETS) for forty years (1943–1983).

== Europe ==
Gorelick was born in Slutsk in 1911 to Rabbi Avrohom Moshe, the son-in-law of Rabbi Yerucham of Dubrov. Rabbi Yerucham of Dubrov, his namesake, was close to the Beis HaLevi, and earned the nickname, "Rav Yerucham Charif" (the Sharp One). Rabbi Avrohom Moshe served as rav in several towns in Poland. In 1927, when the Bolsheviks were persecuting the rabbis, the family immigrated to America, but Rabbi Gorelick stayed behind in Europe.

In his early youth, Gorelick learned in the Łomza Yeshiva, and then spent ten years in the Chofetz Chaim's yeshiva in Radin, where he learned with Rabbi Naftoli Trop and Rabbi Moshe Landynski. Afterwards, he studied in Brisk for five years under Rabbi Yitzchok Zev Soloveitchik until the outbreak of World War II.

In 1938, he married a woman from Brisk, the daughter of Rabbi Shmuel Yehudah Belkes, a lay leader of the community who owned a coal factory.

Rabbi Gorelick escaped with his wife and family to Vilna, and continued his studies there with Rabbi Soloveitchik in 1940.

== America ==
In 1940–1941, Gorelick escaped from Europe to Japan. He arrived in America just before America entered the World War II in December 1941.

He first served as rebbe at Mesivtha Tifereth Jerusalem and involved himself in relief efforts. In 1943, Gorelick was appointed a rosh yeshiva at Yeshiva University's Rabbi Isaac Elchanan Theological Seminary where he taught Torah to thousands of students until his death. He served as rabbi in the Bronx, establishing: Beis Yaakov Beis Miriam in the Bronx; Yeshiva Gedolah L’Mitzuyanim of South Fallsburg, New York; and Yeshiva Gedolah Zichron Moshe of Bronx, which later moved to its permanent home in South Fallsburg, New York on the site of the former Laurel Park Hotel, which the Rabbi purchased on behalf of the Yeshiva. He left behind many writings in their original form, as well as a family of Torah scholars and roshei yeshiva. His son, Rabbi Zvi Abba Gorelick, continued as administrator of Yeshiva Gedolah Zichron Moshe in South Fallsburg until his death on May 1, 2010. His son Rabbi Isser Gorelick is a Rebbi in the Yeshiva and is married to Lakee Gorelick the daughter of Rabbi Elya Svei.

== Writings ==
- YU Torah Online: Letter to Rabbi Yechiel Michel Charlap
