= Irma Rothschild Jung =

German-born Jewish-American community activist

Irma Jung
- Born: Irma Rothschild; July 1, 1897; Randegg, Gottmadingen, Baden, Germany
- Died: May 22, 1993 (aged 95); Manhattan, New York City
- Occupation: Community activist

Irma Rothschild Jung (July 1, 1897 – May 22, 1993) was an American community activist. Born in Germany, Jung dedicated her life to Jewish communal programs for the poor, needy, and persecuted, both in Europe and the United States.

== Early life ==
Jung was born on July 1, 1897, in the village of Randegg, located in Baden, Germany near the Swiss border. Her family were wealthy observant Jews of Swiss-Jewish descent and she was one of twelve siblings. She received her education in Switzerland at the University of Zurich from 1917 to 1919. Following her education, she took an interest in the plight of Eastern European Jews. She married Moravian-born Rabbi Leo Jung on February 28, 1922. Irma and Leo met at Stansstad on Lake Lucerne at a camp she ran for refugee children. Describing their first meeting, Leo wrote in his memoirs that "I saw her, a Kitzur Shulchan Aruch in her hand, lecturing to her charges. Next day we climbed up Pilatus together and in the evening I proposed to her." The Jungs emigrated to New York City in the same year.

Irma and Leo had four daughters together: Erna Villa, Rosalie Rosenfeld, Julie Etra, and Marcella (Micki) Rosen. Her daughter Erna Villa moved to Jerusalem, while her daughter Rosalie Rosenfeld became an Israeli settler and moved to Gush Etzion on the occupied West Bank. Grandson Ezra Rosenfeld has researched her husband's files.

Jung enjoyed mountain climbing and yodeling, reflections of her Swiss background.

== Activism ==
In 1919, during World War I, Jung served as the director of the Bureau of the World Congress of Orthodox Jewry. Between 1919 and 1921, she was the director of the Central Bureau of the Agudath Israel World Organization. Jung organized free camps for refugee children to Switzerland in Stansstad between 1920 and 1921. Upon emigrating to New York City, Jung was the rebbetzin at the Jewish Center on Manhattan's Upper West Side. She became actively involved in feeding and clothing students at Yeshiva University during the Great Depression, serving as the chair of the Yeshiva Dormitory on East Broadway between 1926 and 1928, and as vice president and acting chair of the Yeshiva College Women's Organization between 1934 and 1935. For many years she and her husband were actively involved in the Rabbonim Aid Society, working to help the widows, Holocaust victims, and the impoverished. She founded the women's branch of the Union of Orthodox Jewish Congregations of America (now known as the Orthodox Union). Supportive of the Zionist movement in Palestine and Israel, the Jewish National Fund's Jung Forest in Safed is named after Irma and Leo Jung.

== Death ==
Jung died on May 22, 1993, in New York City. Her funeral was held at the Jewish Center in Manhattan.

== See also ==
- Leo Jung
