= Leo Jung =

American rabbi

Rabbi Leo Jung
- רב אליהו לאו יונג
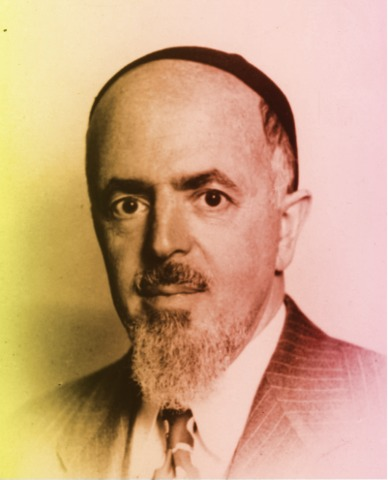
- Rabbi Leo Jung
- Born: Leo Jung; June 20, 1892; Uherský Brod, Moravia, Austria-Hungary
- Died: December 19, 1987 (aged 95); New York, United States
- Occupations: Rabbi, Jewish Scholar, Activist, Fundraiser
- Known for: Architect of the American Jewish Day School system
- Spouse: Irma Rothschild Jung

Rabbi Leo Jung (Hebrew: Eliyahu; June 20, 1892 – December 19, 1987) was one of the major architects of American Orthodox Judaism. He was the indirect progenitor of the religious day school system common throughout North American Jewish communities, He was also a major fundraiser and activist for many Jewish causes worldwide, in the periods before, during and after the Holocaust.

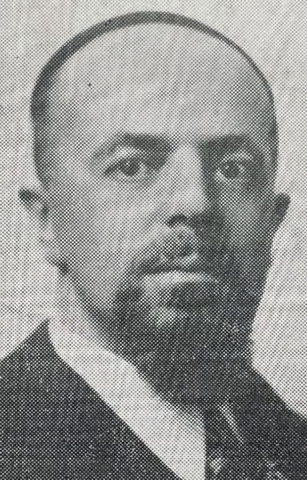
Rabbi Jung at a young age

== Background and education ==
Leo Jung was born on June 20, 1892, in Uherský Brod, Moravia, Austria-Hungary. His father, Meir Tzvi Jung held rabbinic post in Mannheim then was elected rabbi of Uherský Brod in 1890. The elder Jung believed in the Torah im Derekh Eretz (Torah combined with worldly activity) philosophy of Samson Raphael Hirsch. Later he moved to London. Jung's father founded schools in Uherský Brod, Kraków and London, where both religious and secular learning took place. In London, Meir Tzvi was a leader in Agudat Yisrael, and the Sinai Movement. The Sinai Movement was a movement in which young men would meet for the purpose of studying Talmud and socializing. At his death in June 1921, Meir Tzvi was the Chief Minister of the Federation of Synagogues in England, an appointment he had held since 1912.

In 1916, Jung became the director general of the Sinai League of which his father was founder and president. Meir Tzvi founded the journal, "The Sinaist", based on the Torah im derekh eretz philosophy. Jung became the editor of this bi-monthly journal, which he claimed expressed his father's philosophy, "study is great, for it leads to (right) action".

Jung, like his father, received a secular and Talmudic education. He attended Cambridge University and he received his doctorate from the University of London. In 1910 he attended the Yeshiva of Eperies and in 1911 he went to study in Galanta, Hungary. He also attended the Hildesheimer Rabbinical Seminary in Berlin. Jung claimed that he received three rabbinic ordinations, from Mordechai Zevi Schwartz, Abraham Isaac Kook and David Zvi Hoffmann of Berlin. He regarded his semikhah from Hoffman as, "his last and most cherished semikhah".

== Early career ==
Jung's first American pulpit was in Cleveland, where he arrived in January 1920. In Cleveland he was an, "utterly novel phenomenon, the first English speaking Orthodox rabbi, bearded and a Ph.D." He saw a weak adherence to a dying Orthodoxy there, which he tried to revive. It was there that he raised funds for the first of 15 new aesthetic and modern mikvaos in the United States, to replace unsightly and ill-maintained earlier ones. His new mikvehs, "hygienically and aesthetically on the heights of Judaism". He stated in Rhythm of Life, p. 44

I can remember a number of loathsome places ... and I cannot criticize too sharply the carelessness, which made such conditions possible. Coupled with the inability of the rabbis to discuss this all-important subject and with a lack of informed rebellion among women (who should have refused to get married before the community established decent mikvaoth) the situation prevailed which rendered such hostility on the part of the half informed and uninformed young women more intelligible.

Jung was involved in raising standards by actively creating commissions to improve observance of most aspects of Jewish ritual life including circumcision, conversion, kashrut, shabbat, burial, and mikveh.

After serving for two and a half years at the Knesset Israel congregation in Cleveland, in 1922 he and his wife Irma Rothschild were asked to come to New York City, for the position of rabbi at the prestigious Jewish Center Synagogue, in New York.

Jung hired Joseph Kaminetsky to serve as principal of the newly founded afternoon school and Kaminetsky later became executive director of Manhattan Day School, which evolved from the Jewish Center Day School. Kaminetsky later became the director of the Torah Umesorah school system.

Since Orthodoxy was not well represented in the Jewish-American publication world, Jung's Jewish Library Series and his other works played an important role in creating books for and about Orthodox Judaism. The multi-volumed series helped promote traditional rabbinic biography and literature among the American public, though they had limited circulation.

In 1926, Jung, as head of the editorial board of the Jewish Forum, recommended that all Jewish organizations have Sabbath observance as a fundamental purpose. The Orthodox Union (then known as the Union of Orthodox Jewish Congregations of America, or UOJCA) instituted a Sabbath Committee, which included Jung. The committee's goal was to educate, to rally loyalty to the Sabbath, and facilitate employment opportunities for Sabbath observers.

Jung was vice president of the UOJCA, from 1926 to 1934. In 1926, Jung organized The Rabbinic Council of the UOJCA and was its president for the following eight years. The Rabbinic Council was to assume the rabbinic functions of the Union, including kashrut supervision; the "OU" became its organizational symbol and trademark. As vice president of the UOJCA and organizer of its Rabbinic Council, Jung and others began a crusade to fight the corrupt "kashrut jungle" and replace it with a reliable system under the OU imprint.

== War years ==
Jung was chairman of the American Beth Jacob Committee, founded to support schools for European Orthodox Jewish girls formed in 1927. Run by Agudath Israel, the movement was founded by Sara Schenirer, with the help of some leading Western European Jews, to provide an education for girls. He held the position for a half century. In this role, he was involved with the promulgating in America of the tragic story of the 93 Beis Yaakov "Martyrs". He instituted Kaddish at the Jewish Center for them. Some consider the story apocryphal.

As late as 1942, Jung was raising money and addressing audiences on the significance of Agudat Yisrael; however he quit his membership after the State of Israel was founded when Agudat Yisrael would not co-operate with the Israeli government, even on non-religious affairs.

Jung was sent to Palestine by the American Fund for Palestine Institutions, which supported eighty-six institutions from opera to Beth Jacob, from Habimah (the theatre) to Yeshiva Institutions. Jung also went as chair of the JDC Cultural Committee helping in supporting Yeshivas.

As chair of the religious board of JDC, he saw to it that religious needs were met for Jews in other lands. He went to North Africa in February 1955 to inspect JDC's educational and religious institutions in Tangiers, Morocco, Algiers and Tunis. He also came to the aid of Jews in Iran.

His Israel affiliation was with Poalei Agudat Yisrael, which was called "a fortress of religious Jewry" by some but fiercely opposed by the leading Haredi rabbis of the time. Jung worked for Kibbutz Chofetz Chaim and for its children's village.

He was involved in the resettlement of Lubavitch to New York and specifically in helping Yosef Yitzchok Schneersohn.

In America, he fought for proper employment laws.

== Later years ==
In the 1950s his constant themes were reverence, righteousness and rachmanut, which he referred to as the three "R's" of kedushah (holiness). Reverence for God and man was essential to ensure righteousness or justice, which includes the assurance of our personal worth and of human dignity. Jung wrote:

The key to Judaism is "kedushah" (holiness), the endeavor to plant heaven on earth through divine values. Religion as such is co-extensive with life, holding us close to God. It may be neither divorced from life, nor divorced from God. The Hebrew term kedushah appears in connection with every aspect of Jewishness, from marriage to business from dietary laws to the laws of mourning ... I would fain say of holiness within the Jewish scheme of life that it is composed of three "R's": Reverence, Righteousness and for the moment unexplained rachamanut ... The crowning quality is Rahamanut for which there is as yet no word in the English language. Rahamanut is usually translated as "mercy" or "compassion" but etymologically it means "mother's love"—the unselfish dedicated love of a mother for her little one, her passionate desire to spend herself ... for the purpose of raising her baby from helpless infancy towards self sufficient maturity.

Jung advocated civil rights, the prevention of nuclear disaster, and opposition to communism's perceived immorality. His speeches from the 1950s opposed segregation and atomic energy, supported the United Nations' efforts to promote world peace, and called for racial and economic justice in America. His message reflected that of mainline religion: light would triumph over darkness and good over evil.

During these years, he was on the Executive Committee of the Rabbi Samson Raphael Hirsch Society, whose goal was to translate works by German Orthodox thinkers into English. These works became the core of the Feldheim publishing house.

In the city of Gedera, in the state of Israel, Kefar Eliyahu was named after him.

== Thought and definition of Orthodoxy ==
Jung presented a platform of "Torah-true" Judaism; in his view, "Orthodoxy was the only legitimate form of Judaism."

Jung's book, Living Judaism, from 1922 to 1923, states that he is the rabbi of the Jewish Center, a synagogue for "Jewish Jews." Jung begins an article, "Modern Trends in American Judaism," written in 1936, with the motto for "Jewish Jews."

Leo Jung wrote an essay: "What is Orthodox Judaism" based on lectures from 1927, that may be summarized as follows.

1. We are Torah true. But:

a. Judaism is not fundamentalist, we are against all forms of fundamentalism.

b. Judaism has many voices. All of them accept God, revelation and the law.

c. Judaism is not out of date. Jewish law is forever adapting to the world, through Responsa. We fully embrace the broader cultural world around us. However, the social and economic conditions found in parts of Eastern Europe and New York City's Lower East Side can make it difficult for people to hear and understand the true message of Judaism. Judaism is a living tradition that continues to engage with contemporary culture, but the conditions associated with these communities can sometimes obscure that broader perspective.

2. Judaism is about mitzvot, meant to teach a way of life. Mitzvot cover core areas of life, including for instance eating, sexuality, song, and work. Through mitzvot, you're supposed to learn how to lead a less materialistic life. Torah and mitzvot have an educational goal, teaching family life and acceptable behavior. Torah study is for practical ends.

Jung cites the contemporary philosophies of Havelock Ellis, "The Dance of Life" (1923), Hans Driesch, and Henri Bergson to prove the vitality of life.

Jung developed a friendship with the Pulitzer Prize winning author Herman Wouk in which they corresponded about Orthodoxy. This dialogue culminated in Wouk publishing This is My God: The Jewish Way of Life in 1959, an introduction to Orthodox Judaism for an American audience.

Emanuel Rackman has pointed out that Jung's approach to religion is called the psychological approach as this approach analyses religion with "peace of mind" and "happy and noble living" as its end.

== Grandfather of Modern Orthodoxy ==
As a follower of the path of German Neo-Orthodoxy, Jung was originally able to span the gamut from Haredi Judaism to the more traditional wing of Conservative Judaism. He was bearded and had a doctorate. But as the decades progressed, he found himself defending a specific middle-path. His followers became some of the fathers of Modern Orthodoxy.

He taught ethics and homiletics at Yeshiva University where he influenced the graduates to create an urbane, moral, and dignified Orthodoxy. His successor at the Jewish Center was Norman Lamm.

== Personal life ==
Jung married Irma Rothschild on February 28, 1922. They had four daughters: Erna Villa, Rosalie Rosenfeld, Julie Etra, and Marcella (Micki) Rosen. Erna Villa moved to Jerusalem, while Rosalie Rosenfeld lives in Alon Shevut. Leo Jung died in New York City on December 19, 1987.

Of the Jungs' four daughters, while Villa and Rosenfeld live in Israel, the other two remain in New York City. His grandchildren and great-grandchildren can be found under the family names Etra, Jick, Kassel, Nudelman, Rosen, Rosenfeld, Houminer, Villa, Yoeli and Rubinstein.

== See also ==
- Irma Rothschild Jung

== Books ==
Jewish Library Series

- Jung Leo. The Jewish Library Series, First series of The Jewish Library Series 1928-1964, Second series began 1968 with revised and new volumes.

- First Series

- Foundations of Judaism. The Jewish Library Series. 1. N.Y.: Jewish Center, 1923.
- Essentials of Judaism. The Jewish Library. 2. New York: Union of Orthodox Jewish Congregations of America, 1927, 1943, 1953c.
- Woman. The Jewish Library Series. 3. New York: N.Y.: Soncino Press, 1934.
- Judaism in a Changing World, Ed. The Jewish Library Series. 4. New York: Oxford University Press, 1939.
- Israel of Tomorrow. The Jewish Library Series. 5. New York: Herald Square Press, 1946.
- Jewish Leaders, 1750-1940. The Jewish Library Series. 6. New York: Bloch Publishing Co.,1953.
- Guardians of Our Heritage, 1724-1953, The Jewish Library Series.7. New York: Bloch Publishing Co., 1958.
- Men of The Spirit. The Jewish Library Series. 8. New York: Kymson Publishing Co., 1964.

- Second Series

- Faith . The Jewish Library Series. 1. London, New York: Soncino Press, 1968.
- The Folk. The Jewish Library Series. 2. London, New York: Soncino Press, 1968.
- Woman. The Jewish Library Series. 3. New York, London: Soncino Press, 1970.
- Judaism in a Changing World. The Jewish Library Series. 4. London, New York:1971.
- Panorama of Judaism. Part One. The Jewish Library Series. 5. London, New York: Soncino Press,1974.
- Volume 6- Panorama of Judaism. Part Two. The Jewish Library Series.6. London, New York: Soncino Press, 1974.
- Hyman B. Grinstein. A Short History Of The Jews In The United States. The Jewish Library Series. 7. London, New York: Soncino Press,1980.
- The Path of a Pioneer The Autobiography of Leo Jung, The Jewish Library Series. 8. London, New York: Soncino Press, 1980.

Other Works

- Jung, Leo. Business Ethics in Jewish Law. New York: Hebrew Publishing Company in conjunction with Board of Jewish Education of Greater New Yoirk, 1987.
- ---. Crumbs and Characters: Sermons, Addresses, and Essays. New York: Night and Day Press, 5202/1942.
- ---. Fallen Angels in Jewish, Christian, Mohammedan Literature. Dropsie College for Hebrew and Cognate Learning; 1926. N.Y.: Ktav Publishing House, 1974. Originally presented as the author's thesis, University of London.
- ---. Harvest, Sermons, Addresses, Studies. New York: P. Feldheim Inc., 1956.
- ---. Human Relations in Jewish Law, 1967. Rpt. as Between Man and Man. New York: Jewish Educational Press, 1976.
- ---. Knowledge and Love in Rabbinic Lore. New York: Yeshiva University Press; (Department of Special Publications) 1963.
- ---. Living Judaism. New York: Night and Day Press, 1927.
- ---. Love and Life. New York: Philosophical Library, 1979.
- ---. The Rhythm of Life: Sermons, Studies, Addresses. New York, New York: Pardes Publication House Inc., 5710/1950.
- ---. Sages and Saints. Hoboken, New Jersey: Ktav Press, 1987.
- ---. Towards Sinai: Sermons and Addresses. New York: Pardes Publishing House, 1929.

== Bibliography ==
- Dovi Safier, Man Of Action: The Life and Times of Rabbi Leo Jung (Mishpacha Magazine)
- Gershom Bader, Moses Jung. "Meir Tsevi Jung." Jewish Leaders 1750-1940 Ed. Leo Jung. Jerusalem: Boys Town Jerusalem Publishers, 1964, 295–316.
- Leo Jung. The Path of a Pioneer Autobiography of Leo Jung. The Jewish Library, vol. 8. London, New York: Soncino Press, 1980.
- Milton R. Konvitz. "Leo Jung-Rabbi For All Jews." Midstream 39.6 (Aug/Sept 1993).
- Jacob J. Schacter. "Rabbi Dr. Leo Jung: Reflections on the Centennial of His Birth." Jewish Action 22
- Schacter, Jacob J., ed. Reverence Righteousness and Rachmanut: Essays in Memory of Rabbi Dr. Leo Jung. Northdale, New Jersey and London: Jason Aronson Inc., 1992.
- "Dr. Joseph Kaminetsky" in Dei'ah ve Dibur, Mar. 24, 1999.
- Menachem, Mendel Kasher, Norman Lamm, Leonard Rosenfeld. Leo Jung Jubilee Volume Essays in Honor on the Occasion of his Seventieth Birthday. N.Y.: The Jewish Center Synagogue, 1962.
