= SFHA =

SFHA may refer to:

- San Francisco Housing Authority, the public housing agency for San Francisco
- Scottish Federation of Housing Associations, Scotland's federation of housing associations
- South Fallsburg Hebrew Association, an Orthodox Jewish congregation in South Fallsburg, New York.
- Special Flood Hazard Areas, geographic areas identified by the U.S. National Flood Insurance Program
