= Chaim Malinowitz =

Haredi rabbi and scholar (1952–2019)

Rabbi Chaim Malinowitz חיים מלינוביץ
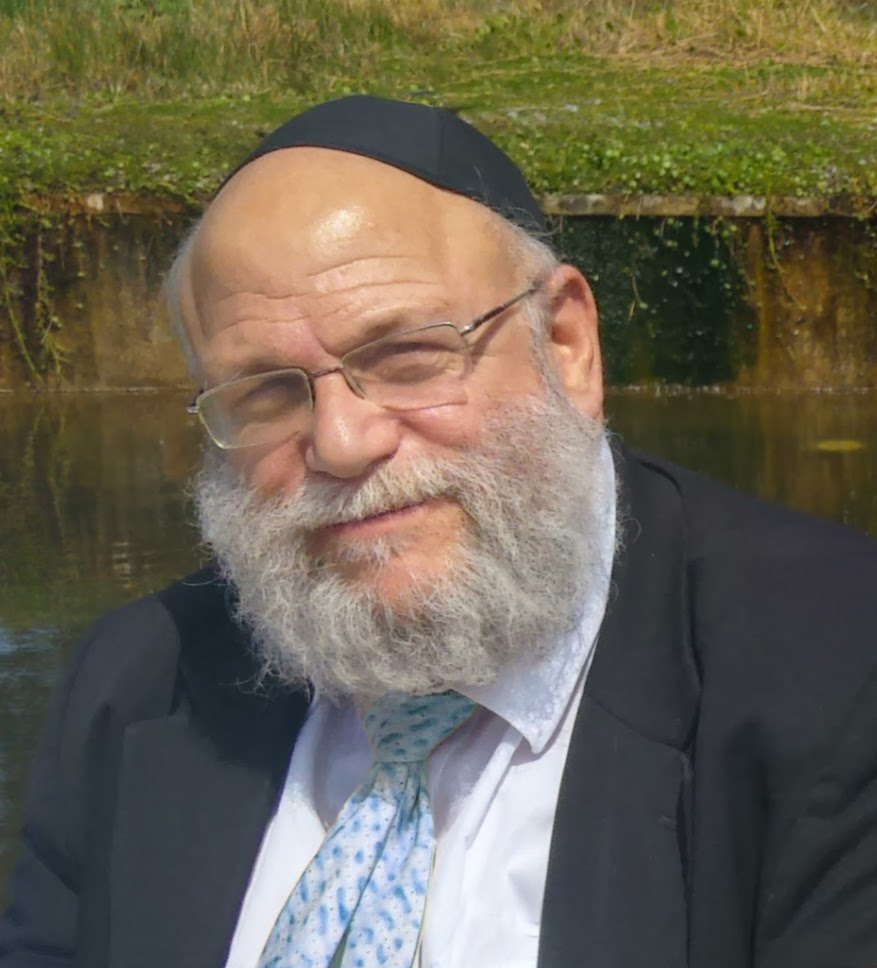
- Malinowitz in 2018

Personal life
- Born: Chaim Zev Malinowitz; 1952 Lower East Side, New York City, United States
- Died: November 21, 2019 (age 67) Jerusalem, Israel
- Buried: Rechovot
- Spouse: Simi Maza
- Children: 10
- Parent: Rabbi Avrohom Aharon Malinowitz (father)
- Education: Yeshivas Iyun HaTalmud, Monsey, New York

Religious life
- Religion: Judaism
- Denomination: Haredi
- Synagogue: Beis Tefillah Yonah Avraham
- Position: Rav
- Organisation: ArtScroll
- Residence: Jerusalem
- Semikhah: Rabbi Moshe Feinstein

Chaim Zev Malinowitz (Hebrew: חיים מלינוביץ; 1952 – November 21, 2019) was a Haredi community rabbi, dayan (rabbinical court judge), and Talmudic scholar. Fluent in all areas of the Talmud, halakha (Jewish law), and hashkafa (Orthodox Jewish worldview), he was the general editor of the 73-volume Schottenstein Edition of the Babylonian Talmud published by ArtScroll. After immigrating to Israel, he became the rabbi of Beis Tefillah Yonah Avraham, an English-speaking congregation for Anglophone Israeli immigrants in Ramat Beit Shemesh, which he led for 17 years.

== Early life and education ==
Chaim Zev Malinowitz was born in 1952 on the Lower East Side of New York City. His father, Rabbi Avrohom Aharon Malinowitz, had been a student of Aharon Kotler in Kletsk, Poland (historically Lithuania, now Belarus). Malinowitz was a gifted student at Rabbi Jacob Joseph School. After his bar mitzvah, he was accepted to the Talmudical Yeshiva of Philadelphia where, albeit younger than the other students, he skipped two grades and was accepted to the beth midrash (undergraduate-level) program under Rabbi Mendel Kaplan. His desire to have more time for study led him to begin awakening at 4 a.m. and praying vasikin, the pre-dawn prayer, a practice he maintained for the rest of his life.

He next studied at Yeshivas Iyun HaTalmud in Monsey, New York, under Rabbi Abba Berman, a main disciple of Rabbi Yerucham Levovitz. He remained at this yeshivah for six years, until his marriage in 1976, whereupon he entered the kollel. In 1980, he was appointed by Berman to take over as rosh kollel when Berman made aliyah to Israel. In the early 1970s, Malinowitz also studied the Tanya in a late-night shiur given by Chabad rabbi Yoel Kahn.

== Rabbinic career ==
After receiving rabbinic ordination from Rabbi Moshe Feinstein, Malinowitz served as a dayan (rabbinical court judge) for the rabbinical court of Kollel HaRabbanim in Monsey. In this role, he became known as a "world authority on gittin" (Jewish divorce) and also dealt with cases of agunos. He staunchly opposed the 1992 New York Get Law proposed by Jewish activist groups, which would penalize husbands who refused to grant their wives a get by making it difficult for them to arrange a civil divorce. Malinowitz contended that the coercive element of the penalty could halakhically invalidate all divorces in New York. Ultimately, Rabbi Shlomo Zalman Auerbach's decision on the matter, which agreed with Malinowitz's position, eroded support for the law.

In 1992 Malinowitz was appointed, along with Rabbi Yisrael Simcha Schorr, as general editor of the Schottenstein Edition of the Babylonian Talmud published by ArtScroll. The English-language Schottenstein Talmud spanned 73 volumes and was completed over a period of 15 years. Malinowitz was responsible for approving "every single line and every single footnote" of the translation and commentary of the Talmud submitted by the editorial staff for both the English and Hebrew editions. According to a senior editor on the project, Rabbi Eliezer Herzka: "His role was to learn through the sugya [topic] with the ArtScroll commentary to probe it to find its weak points". Herzka explained that Malinowitz's knowledge of the Talmud was so broad that he would know when the present sugya inadequately covered important opinions by the classic Talmudic commentators that were cited in similar sugyas elsewhere in Talmud. Nothing was considered final until Malinowitz approved the finished draft. Malinowitz also worked on ArtScroll's elucidated Mishnah project. He continued his association with ArtScroll after making aliyah in 1997.

Upon moving to Israel, Malinowitz began to teach at Yeshivat Aish HaTorah. In 2002, he was hired as Rav of Beis Tefillah Yonah Avraham in Ramat Beit Shemesh, an English-speaking congregation catering to Anglo olim. As a community rav, Malinowitz introduced many shiurim to the synagogue schedule, including classes on different subjects and at different levels for men, women, and children. He also studied one-on-one with many congregants.

He broke with his Haredi colleagues in opposing a ban on Natan Slifkin's books.

== Personal qualities ==
Malinowitz was fluent in all areas of the Talmud, halakha (Jewish law), and hashkafa (Orthodox Jewish worldview). He combined this knowledge with "fearlessness" to act on his convictions and a strong desire for truth. At the same time, he was regarded as a friendly, "down to earth" personality who cared for others.

== Personal life ==
Malinowitz married Simi Maza, daughter of Rabbi Dovber Maza, a Torah educator, in 1976. The couple had six sons and four daughters. After making aliyah, they resided in Jerusalem.

Malinowitz died in Jerusalem on November 21, 2019, at the age of 67. He was buried in the Rehovot cemetery near his parents.

== Selected articles ==
- Malinowitz, Rabbi Chaim. "The New York State Get Bill and its Halachic Ramifications". Jewish Law Articles.
- Malinowitz, Rabbi Chaim (Winter 1999). "Pitfalls to Avoid in Obtaining a Get". Jewish Action.
