= 2026 Upper West Side stabbing attack =

Attack in New York City, US

- Location: Upper West Side, Manhattan, New York City, US
- Date: July 23, 2026
- Target: Civilians
- Attack type: Stabbing
- Weapons: Knife, screwdriver
- Deaths: 0
- Injuries: 2
- Motive: Alleged antisemitism

On July 23, 2026, two men were stabbed in separate attacks on the Upper West Side of Manhattan, New York City. The 51-year-old suspect was arrested after barricading himself in his apartment and subsequently indicted for multiple accounts of attempted murder as a hate crime.

In the first attack, a 57-year-old Asian man was stabbed in the back with a knife. The second attack took place a short distance away near a local synagogue, where a 50-year-old Jewish man was stabbed in the torso with a screwdriver after attending services for Tisha B'Av. According to police statements, witnesses reported the assailant shouted "Allahu Akbar" during the assaults. The second incident is being investigated and prosecuted as an antisemitic hate crime.

== Attack ==
There were two separate stabbings carried out by the same perpetrator, with the first stabbing occurring at 84th Street and Central Park West, where a 57-year-old Asian man was stabbed in the back with a knife, and the second stabbing at 86th Street and Amsterdam Avenue, where the assailant stabbed a 50-year-old Jewish man in the torso with a screwdriver. The second stabbing took place half a block away from a Jewish community center in a neighborhood known for having a large Jewish community. The attack occurred on the solemn fast day of Tisha B'Av, a Jewish day of mourning commemorating the destruction of the Temples in Jerusalem. Initially due to the nature of the holiday which involves fasting, onlookers initially thought the Jewish victim who was wearing a kippah at the time, collapsed from not eating for hours prior to seeing him holding napkins by his chest. The stabbing victim, who according to witnesses was identifiably Jewish and had just left the Jewish Center, a local synagogue up the street where he had attended services marking Tisha B'av before being stabbed, pulled the screwdriver out of his chest himself out of fear he would fall over on top of the object.

New York City Police Commissioner Jessica Tisch said that witness and victim statements report the alleged perpetrator yelled "Allahu Akbar" during the two separate stabbing attacks. Police Commissioner Tisch and Mayor Zohran Mamdani have both speculated that mental health may have been a factor in the stabbings.

After the attacks, the alleged perpetrator fled on foot, leaving the knife behind at the scene and barricaded himself in his apartment building where the police apprehended him. The individual arrested by police, was charged with attempted murder for the two stabbings and for a hate crime related to the stabbing of the Jewish victim. When police executed a search warrant of the perpetrator's apartment, they recovered books including a Quran, a biography of Cuban revolutionary Che Guevara, and the writing by the Communist philosopher Karl Marx.

The individual arrested was indicted on state charges in September 2026, including four counts of attempted murder as a hate crime. An assistant district attorney said that a search of his cellphone had turned up antisemitic content. He pleaded not guilty to the ten counts included in the indictment.

== Reactions and protests ==
New York City Mayor Zohran Mamdani said he is thankful the perpetrator is being held accountable and hope(s) he will be prosecuted to the fullest extent of the law.”

New York City Council Speaker Julie Menin released a statement in response to the attacks that said: "I am absolutely sickened and furious by what appears to be an antisemitic stabbing on the Upper West Side. While we await additional details to be confirmed, we know that what is happening in our city is abhorrent."

New York State Governor Kathy Hochul said in a statement she wrote on X that she stood beside both the Asian and Jewish communities, stating that "Asian New Yorkers, like Jewish New Yorkers, have endured waves of hate-fuelled violence in recent years". She continued that "Hate rarely stops with one group. New York will continue confronting it wherever it appears."

Several Jewish groups linked Mayor Mamdani's recent video calling for the arrest of Israeli Prime Minister Benjamin Netanyahu and his other rhetoric around Jews and Israel to the July 23 incident. Nily Rozic, an Israeli-American member of the New York State Assembly who represents portions of Queens, said with reference to Mamdani that "if you can’t fully condemn calls to 'globalize the intifada,' you should be prepared to confront the normalizing of that rhetoric. Words inflame, embolden, and lead to violence against Jewish communities."

The UJA-Federation of New York released a statement in response to the attack, and criticized Mayor Mamdani saying: "These attacks came soon after Mayor Mamdani once again used his official platform to viciously attack Israel, the only Jewish state. We cannot ignore the dangerous climate created when elected leaders relentlessly portray Israel - and, by extension, the many Jewish New Yorkers who feel a deep connection to it - as uniquely evil and illegitimate."

On July 26, Jewish demonstrators and community leaders protested in a "United Against Hate" rally organized by the #EndJewHatred movement following the stabbing attack and other hate crimes against Jews and other minorities in the city, with the protest accusing Mamdani of creating a dangerous environment for Jews in New York City. A counter-protest was staged by Neturei Karta, a Hasidic Jewish anti-Zionist group who came out in support of mayor Mamdani.

In an appearance on Sunday Morning Futures With Maria Bartiromo, Israeli prime minister Benjamin Netanyahu criticized mayor Mamdani for creating the conditions that led to the attack, saying "I don't think it's accidental that after he made this hate speech against Israel and against me, the next day, a Jew is stabbed coming out of a synagogue."
