= Yeshiva Shaarei Torah =

Location
- 91 West Carlton Road, Suffern, New York; United States; 41.123560°N 74.090000°W

Information
- Other name: Shaarei Torah of Rockland
- Type: Mesivta (high school)
- Religious affiliation: Orthodox Judaism
- Established: 1968
- Founder: Berel Wein
- Principal: Emanuel Schwartz
- Head teacher: Martin Wolmark
- Campus size: 5 acres
- Campus type: Suburban
- Website: www.yst.edu

Yeshiva Shaarei Torah or Shaarei Torah of Rockland is a mesivta (Orthodox Jewish high school) in Suffern, New York.

== History ==
The school was originally established in 1968 as Monsey Mesivta High School in Monsey, New York. Nine years later it was taken over by Berel Wein, when it became known as Yeshiva Shaarei Torah. Wein served as its rosh yeshiva (dean), and Emanuel Schwartz was the English studies principal, until the latter stepped down from that position in 1994, remaining at the school to focus on teaching precalculus. Wein left the school in 1997, when it was taken over by Rabbi Mordechai Wolmark, who then became dean.

== Campus ==
Shaarei Torah is situated on a 5-acre campus on West Carlton Road in Suffern, New York. It consists of a main educational building and a student residence hall.

== See also ==
- Torah study
