= Yisrael Mendel Kaplan =

American rabbi (1913–1985)

Rabbi Yisrael Mendel Kaplan
- Born: April 14, 1913; Baranavichy, Russian Empire
- Died: April 4, 1985 (aged 71)
- Education: Yeshiva Ohel Torah-Baranovich
- Occupation: Teacher
- Years active: 1946—1985
- Employer: Talmudical Yeshiva of Philadelphia
- Notable work: Nesivei Yam
- Spouse: Sarah Baila Gutman
- Children: Yeruchom Kaplan; Tzirel Benoliel; Rachel Lopian; Esther Hutner and 2 others
- Parent(s): Abraham and Esther Kaplan
- Relatives: Dovid Kaplan (great nephew)

Israel or Yisrael Mendel Kaplan (April 14, 1913 – April 4, 1985), known as "Reb Mendel" was an American Orthodox Jewish rabbi and author. He was best known as a teacher in the Hebrew Theological College of Chicago and the Talmudical Yeshiva of Philadelphia, where he mentored many future leaders of Orthodox Jewry.

== Early life ==
Yisrael Mendel Kaplan was born in Baranovich, Congress Poland, Russian Empire (now Baranavichy, Belarus) to Avraham and Esther Kaplan. Avraham was a lawyer and Esther was involved in community service, raising funds for the yeshiva and feeding the poor.

After his bar mitzvah, Kaplan was enrolled in Yeshiva Ohel Torah-Baranovich, and studied under Elchonon Wasserman. He was considered a very promising student and was assigned Wasserman's son, Naftali, as a study partner. When Wasserman needed to travel overseas in order to raise money for the yeshiva, Kaplan would deliver the lecture in his stead. He later studied in the Mir yeshiva under Yeruchom Levovitz.

In late 1939, during the invasion of Poland, the Jews of Baranovich fled for their lives. Wasserman advised his yeshiva students to regroup in then-independent Vilna, Lithuania. Kaplan, who by this time had gotten married, moved there with his family, where he studied under Yitzchak Zev Soloveitchik. In June 1940, when the Soviet Union occupied Vilna, Jewish life became unbearable. Like the members of the Mir yeshiva and other refugees there, Kaplan sought visas to allow him to escape Nazi and Soviet rule. He obtained a de facto destination visa from the Dutch consul but was unable to obtain the necessary transit visa from the Japanese Vice-consul, Chiune Sugihara, that would allow his family to detour through Japan while awaiting some final, true destination.

The family nevertheless boarded the trains to the Russian port city of Vladivostok. His son, Chaim Ozer, was born on the train ride. After entering Japanese territory by boat, Kaplan expected deportation back to Russia and eventually Siberia. Japanese officials goaded him to produce any kind of visa, and he reluctantly showed them an obviously tampered Japanese transit visa. Inexplicably, it was stamped and accepted and the family continued on to Kobe and then later to Shanghai.

His son Shimon was born in Shanghai, while his middle son, Chaim Ozer got sick and died there.

== Career ==
In 1946, the Kaplans arrived in San Francisco, and from there they went on to Chicago, where Kaplan's brother Hertzl was teaching at the Chicago yeshiva that was to become the Hebrew Theological College. Kaplan accepted a teaching position there, though his students were English-speaking and his English was not yet mastered. Even so, eventually he found success teaching the American youth. He won the students over by offering to "teach them to read the Chicago Tribune if they taught him to read English." His insights into world affairs and reading between the lines of the daily paper (even while needing help with the language) earned him his student's respect.

When his girls were old enough for high school, his wife moved with them to Brooklyn, New York, so they could attend a Jewish girls high school in Williamsburg. Kaplan started Kaplan's Winery Corporation, producing traditional Kosher Concord wine, in an effort to supplement his income to cover his daughter's tuition costs.

In 1960, Kaplan joined his family in New York and taught in a number of yeshivas, primarily at Brooklyn's Yeshiva Toras Emes Kamenitz. In 1965 he was invited to start teaching the first-level post-high school class in the Talmudical Yeshiva of Philadelphia. He accepted the position, lived in the dormitory, and commuted each weekend to his wife and family in Brooklyn. Kaplan did not consider it beneath his dignity to fix his own car or pick up random hitchhikers from the side of the road. He remained at the Talmudical Yeshiva of Philadelphia and taught the same level until his death on April 4, 1985. To this, Yaakov Kamenetsky commented "Ahzah Kuntz (lit. transl. What a feat!). He is greater than famous roshei yeshiva, and he can still work quietly under younger men."

== Personal life ==
While studying in Mir in 1933 (or 1935), Kaplan married Sarah Baila Gutman (b. Navahrudak, 1910 – d. New York City, March 12, 2008), the daughter of Tzvi Hirsch Gutman, the administrator of the yeshiva in Baranovich. When Gutman was looking for a match, he asked Elchonon Wasserman about a number of prospects, and Wasserman recommended Kaplan. When Gutman demurred, saying "Isn't your own son, Naftoli, a little better?" Wasserman retorted, "My Naftoli is a good boy, but he doesn't measure up to Mendel". Sarah Baila died in 2008.

The couple had six children: Tzirel, wife of Haim Benoliel, died in 2016; Rachel, wife of David Lopian; Yeruchem Kaplan died in 2022; Chaim Ozer Kaplan, born circa 1942, died in Shanghai; Shimon Kaplan, died in 2010; and Esther, wife of Shaul Hutner.

== Notable students ==
- Haim Benoliel, Founder and Rosh HaYeshiva of Yeshivat Mikdash Melech
- Moshe Gottesman, dean of the Hebrew Academy of Nassau County
- Chaim Malinowitz, dayan (rabbinic judge), general editor of the 73-volume Schottenstein Edition of the Babylonian Talmud
- Berel Wein, rabbi, lecturer and author
- Yosef Mermelstein, Rosh Yeshiva of Yeshivas Novominsk

== Works ==
- Nesivei Yam ("Paths of the Sea") – containing novellae on the Talmudical tractate Kiddushin (2005).

== Sources ==
- Greenwald, Yisroel (1995). Reb Mendel and his Wisdom. ISBN 0-89906-117-6.
