= David Hirsch (rabbi) =

American rabbi

Rabbi David Hirsch
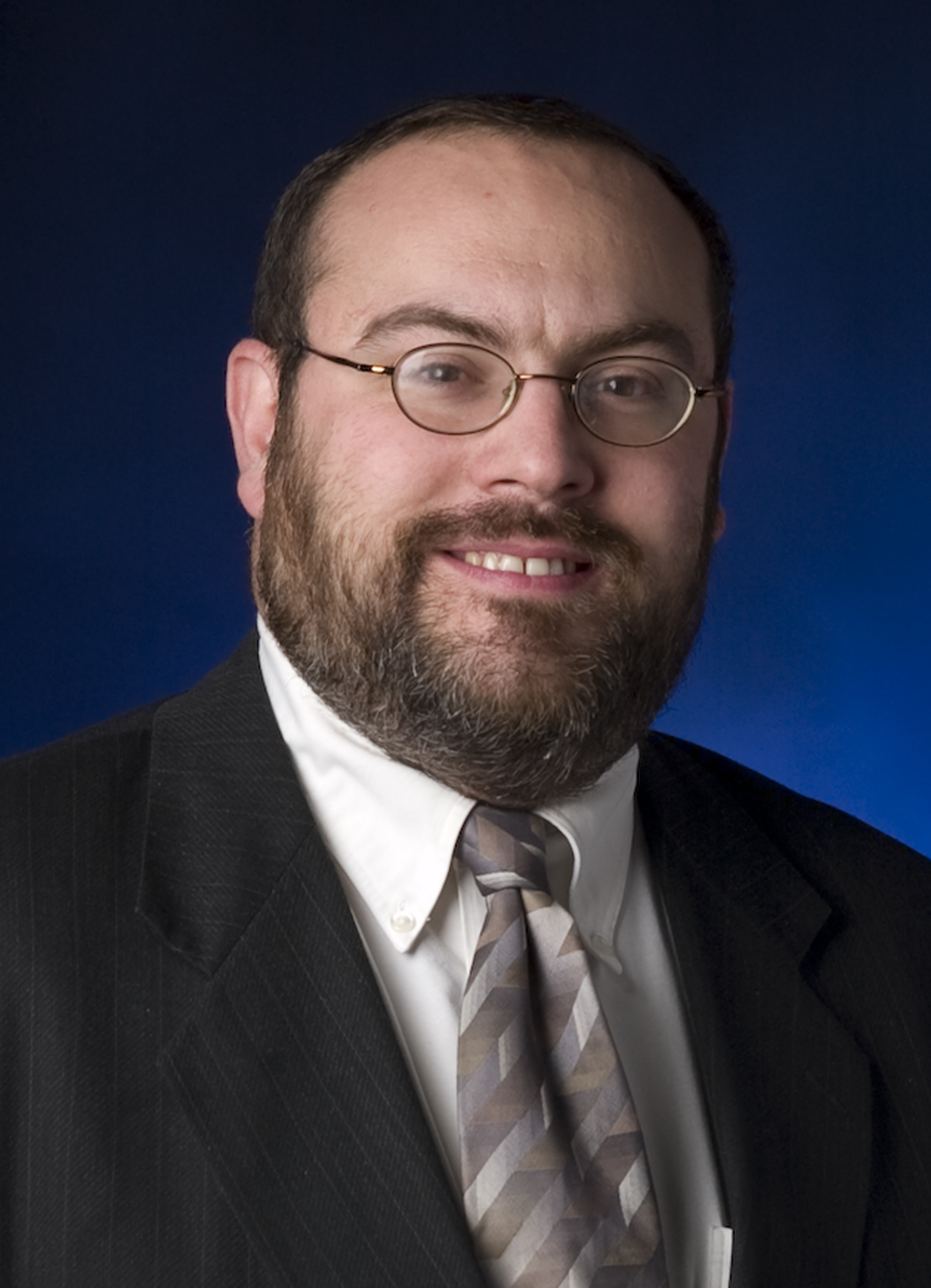

Personal life
- Education: Yeshiva University

Religious life
- Religion: Judaism
- Denomination: Orthodox
- Synagogue: Kehillas Bais Yosef, Passaic, New Jersey
- Yeshiva: Rabbi Isaac Elchanan Theological Seminary (RIETS)
- Position: Rabbi
- Semikhah: RIETS

David Hirsch (born 1968) is an American rabbi. He serves as rosh yeshiva at the Rabbi Isaac Elchanan Theological Seminary of Yeshiva University in New York City. He is the spiritual leader and rav of Kehilas Bais Yosef in Passaic, New Jersey.

== Early life ==
David Hirsch grew up in Peoria, Illinois and attended the Fasman Yeshiva High School in Skokie. He was the captain of his high school basketball team. After graduating from Fasman, Hirsch spent two years studying in Yeshivat Sha'alvim in Israel. Hirsch studied under Rabbi Zalman Nechemia Goldberg during that time. He continued his learning at the Hebron Yeshiva in Israel.

In 1990, Hirsch graduated summa cum laude from Yeshiva College. He majored in computer science. Upon graduation, Hirsch received the Rothman Award for Excellence in Talmud. He earned his MS degree in Jewish education from the Azrieli Graduate School of Jewish Education and Administration in 1993. That same year, he was ordained at the Rabbi Isaac Elchanan Theological Seminary (RIETS). He also received semikhah (rabbinic ordination) from Zalman Nechemiah Goldberg.

After Hirsch was granted semikhah from RIETS, he was named a fellow of the Gruss Kollel Elyon.

== Career ==
On June 7, 2000, Hirsch was appointed Rosh Yeshiva of the Stone Beit Midrash Program at Yeshiva University, where he taught for seven years. He holds the "Eva, Morris, and Jack K. Rubin Memorial Chair in Rabbinics" there. He also served as an assistant to the Rosh Kollel of the Katz Kollel. He was later appointed to Rosh Yeshiva in the Mazer Yeshiva Program where he currently teaches.

As a pulpit rabbi, Hirsch served as the senior rabbi at the Fleetwood Synagogue, a Modern Orthodox shul located in Mount Vernon, just outside of New York City. He then moved his family to Passaic, New Jersey, where he currently serves as the rabbi of Kehilas Bais Yosef.

During the summer months, Hirsch has served as rosh kollel for many years, including at Camp Lavi in the Poconos, and at his own Passaic Summer Kollel in New Jersey.

== Works ==
Hirsch is a prolific speaker, with nearly 3,000 lectures on Judaism captured on media and available online. He has published hundreds of articles and Dvrei Torah. He published his first sefer, titled, V'Yosef Dovid.

== Personal life ==
Hirsch lives in Passaic, New Jersey with his wife, Miriam, a professor at Stern College for Women. They have five children.
