= Dovid Kaplan =

Rabbi, educator, and author

Rabbi Dovid Kaplan דוד קפלן

Personal life
- Born: Dovid Kaplan Chicago, Illinois
- Spouse: Tammy
- Education: Northeastern Illinois University

Religious life
- Religion: Judaism
- Yeshiva: Ohr Somayach, Jerusalem
- Position: Senior lecturer
- Began: 1987
- Other: Mashgiach ruchani, Yeshivas Bais Yisroel, Jerusalem
- Residence: Jerusalem

Dovid Kaplan (Hebrew: דוד קפלן) is an Orthodox Jewish rabbi, kiruv educator, author, and speaker. He is known for his inspirational and humorous storytelling both in his international speaking engagements and in his Impact! series of books.

== Early life and education ==
Kaplan was born in Chicago. He is the grandson of Rabbi Hertzl Kaplan and great-nephew of Rabbi Mendel Kaplan, rosh yeshivas at the Hebrew Theological College in Skokie, Illinois. Kaplan graduated from Fasman Yeshiva High School (the Skokie Yeshiva) in 1976, and attended Northeastern Illinois University. He received rabbinical ordination in Israel.

== Career ==
Kaplan initially embarked on a business career as co-owner of a kosher restaurant in the Chicago area. In 1987 he switched tracks and became a teacher of Talmud at Ohr Somayach, Jerusalem, where he currently serves as senior lecturer. He is also a mashgiach ruchani at Yeshivas Bais Yisroel in Neve Yaakov, Jerusalem.

Kaplan launched his writing career with a 64-page "guidebook" for entry-level Talmud students titled The Ohr Somayach Gemara Companion (2000). In 2003 he compiled a humorous collection of short stories from his work with baalei teshuva at Ohr Somayach titled The Kiruv Files. Kaplan saw the book as a tool for baalei teshuva to know "what they should do and, more importantly, what they shouldn't do".

Kaplan began writing a parenting column for Hamodia magazine in the 2000s and collected many of his popular columns into the books Polishing Diamonds: Bringing out the sparkle in our children (2005) and Perfecting Diamonds: Bringing out the sparkle in our children (2008). Since 2006, he has published six titles in the Impact! series of inspirational short stories. Twenty-six of his stories were adapted for children in the 2009 book Impact! for Kids by Leah Subar. He is also active as an international lecturer on Jewish education, parenting, and other subjects. In a 2011 interview, he said he had "about 2,500 stories on file" to use in speeches.

== Personal ==
Kaplan and his wife, Tammy, and their family reside in the Neve Yaakov neighborhood of Jerusalem. He is a Kohen.

== Bibliography ==
- My Wife, My Queen: A No-holds-barred Shalom Bayis Book for Men. Adir Press. 2019. ISBN 9781988022482.
- Shabbos Table Impact!: Short stories on the parsha with an immediate message. Israel Bookshop. 2014. ISBN 978-1600912870.
- Lasting Impact! 225 short stories with an immediate message. Shanky's Judaica. 2010. ISBN 978-1600911392.
- Real Impact! 205 short stories with an immediate lesson. Shanky's Judaica. 2009. ISBN 978-1600910906.
- Double Impact!: 348 short stories with an immediate lesson. Targum Press. 2009. ISBN 978-1568715148.
- Perfecting Diamonds: Bringing out the sparkle in our children. Feldheim Publishers. 2008. ISBN 978-9657371671.
- Major Impact!: 285 short stories with an immediate message. Targum Press. 2007. ISBN 978-1568714356.
- Impact!: 230 short stories with an immediate lesson. Targum Press. 2006. ISBN 1568713835.
- Polishing Diamonds: Bringing out the sparkle in our children. Feldheim Publishers. 2005. ISBN 965-90652-5-6.
- The Kiruv Files. Targum Press. 2003. ISBN 1568712359.
- The Ohr Somayach Gemara Companion. Ohr Somayach. 2000. ISBN 1568711719.
