= Joseph Berger (author) =

American journalist, author, and speaker

- Born: January 17, 1945 (age 81); Lysva, Russia
- Education: City College of New York; Columbia University Graduate School of Journalism (MA)
- Occupations: Journalist, author
- Spouse: Brenda
- Children: 1
- Writing career
- Language: English
- Genres: Non-fiction
- Subjects: History, social science, ethnic culture
- Notable work: Displaced Persons: Growing Up American After the Holocaust

Joseph Berger (born January 17, 1945, in Lysva, Soviet Union) is an American journalist, author, and speaker. He was a staff reporter and editor for The New York Times from 1984 to 2014 and has authored five books. His book Displaced Persons: Growing Up American After the Holocaust describes his upbringing as a refugee child of Yiddish-speaking parents.

== Early life and education ==
Joseph Berger was born in Lysva, Russia, to Polish-Jewish parents who had fled their hometowns to escape the Nazis. Berger lived in several displaced persons camps in post-World War II Europe before immigrating to the United States in 1950 with his parents and younger brother. A sister was born in the U.S. His book Displaced Persons: Growing Up American After the Holocaust describes his upbringing as a refugee child of Yiddish-speaking parents.

Berger attended the Manhattan Day School, an Orthodox yeshiva, followed by a year at Yeshiva University, before enrolling at the Bronx High School of Science. After high school he attended the City College of New York, graduating in 1966, and completed his M.A. in journalism at the Columbia University Graduate School of Journalism.

== Career ==
Berger was an English teacher from 1967 to 1971. He then became a feature writer for the New York Post from 1971 to 1978. He next worked as a reporter and religion writer for Newsday from 1978 to 1984.

Berger joined the staff of The New York Times in 1984. He served as chief religion correspondent from 1985 to 1987, and as national and local education correspondent from 1987 to 1993. He then served as deputy education editor and acting education editor, leading a 10-person staff. Berger wrote a column on education from 2006 to 2008. Articles that he wrote on New York's ethnic culture between 2004 and 2007 formed the basis for his book The World in a City: Traveling the Globe Through the Neighborhoods of the New New York. He also served as a temporary assistant Metro editor and Times bureau chief in Jerusalem. He retired from the paper in December 2014.

== Awards and honors ==
Berger was a three-time winner of the Religion Newswriters Association's Supple Award during his stint at Newsday. He received the 1993 Education Writers Association award "for exposing biases in bilingual education" and the 2011 Peter Kihss Award from The Society of the Silurians, for his reporting work and "his interest in mentoring younger colleagues".

Berger is a popular speaker on the subjects of immigration, education, New York City, the Holocaust, and Israel.

== Personal life ==
Berger and his wife Brenda, a clinical psychologist and psychoanalyst, have one daughter. They reside in Westchester County, where he is a member of a Reconstructionist synagogue.

== Bibliography ==
- The Young Scientists: America's Future and the Winning of the Westinghouse. Addison-Wesley. 1994. ISBN 9780201632552.
- Displaced Persons: Growing Up American After the Holocaust. Scribner. 2001. ISBN 9780684857572.
- The World in a City: Traveling the Globe Through the Neighborhoods of the New New York. Ballantine Books. 2007. ISBN 9780345487384.
- The Pious Ones: The World of Hasidim and Their Battles with America. Harper Collins. 2014. ISBN 9780062123350.
- Elie Wiesel: Confronting the Silence. Yale University Press. 2025. ISBN 9780300228984.
