= Faith and Fate =

- Directed by: Ashley Lazarus
- Produced by: Berel Wein
- Release date: 2005
- Running time: 107 minutes
- Country: United States
- Language: English

Faith and Fate: The Story of The Jewish People In The 20th Century is a documentary produced by Berel Wein about the Jewish people in the last century.
