= Isaac Bernstein =

Irish Orthodox rabbi and orator

Isaac Bernstein (12 November 1939 – 29 August 1994) was an Irish Orthodox rabbi and orator of Jewish law and philosophy.

== Education and career ==
Born and raised in Dublin, Ireland, Bernstein graduated from Trinity College in Dublin, receiving a BA in mathematics in 1961, and getting his rabbinical ordination from Rabbi Leib Gurwicz, a former rosh yeshiva of the Gateshead Yeshiva in Gateshead, England.

Bernstein began his rabbinical career at Terenure Hebrew Congregation in Dublin from 1967 to 1971. He moved to the Hampstead Garden Suburb, London, serving as rabbi from 1972 to 1977. He then moved to the United States to lead the Jewish Center in New York City from 1977 to 1981. He returned to Britain in 1981 to serve as rabbi in Finchley, London until his untimely death in 1994.

From 1985 to his death in 1994, Bernstein gave weekly Torah lectures at Ner Yisrael synagogue in Hendon, London and the synagogue maintains a large collection of his recorded lectures on file.
