= Joseph Kaminetsky =

American Orthodox rabbi and Jewish educator (1911–1999)

Rabbi Joseph Kaminetsky
- Rabbi Joseph Kaminetsky

Principal of Manhattan Day School

Director of Torah Umesorah
- In office 1948–1980

Personal details
- Born: 1911 Brooklyn, New York
- Died: March 17, 1999 (aged 87–88) Jerusalem, Israel
- Education: Yeshiva University, Teachers College, Columbia University
- Occupation: Rabbi, Jewish educator
- Known for: Founding director of Torah Umesorah – National Society for Hebrew Day Schools

Joseph Kaminetsky (1911 – March 17, 1999) was an American Orthodox rabbi who became the pioneering first director of Torah Umesorah – National Society for Hebrew Day Schools of North America, based in New York City. He was directly responsible for the establishment of hundreds of yeshiva day schools across the United States outside of the New York Metropolitan Area.

== Education and mission ==
Kaminetsky was born in Brooklyn, New York in 1911. At first, he attended public school for a year, but his father wanted him to attend a yeshiva, and sold the family home in order to afford the tuition; they moved from East New York to Brownsville. Kaminetsky attended Yeshiva Rabbi Chaim Berlin for elementary school, and later Talmudical Academy High School on East Broadway on the Lower East Side of Manhattan.

Kaminetsky then became a member of the first class at Yeshiva University, graduating magna cum laude in 1932. He immediately sought to immerse himself in the area of Jewish education, becoming the principal of the afternoon school of Manhattan's prestigious Jewish Center synagogue and later its assistant rabbi under Rabbi Leo Jung, serving this post in the 1930s and 1940s. After receiving his doctorate in education from Columbia Teachers College, he became the executive director of Manhattan Day School. It was at this post that he was tapped to be a leader at Torah Umesorah. He served as educational director for two years before rising to director of the entire organization, replacing Rabbi Shraga Feivel Mendlowitz upon the latter's death in 1948.

Kaminetsky was seen as a true visionary by the leaders of the American Jewish community. At Kaminetsky's funeral in 1999, Rabbi Boruch Mordechai Ezrachi told a story of how, upon his first visit to America in 1973, he was in the presence of Rabbi Moshe Feinstein when Kaminetsky entered the room. He did not know who Kaminetsky was and was astonished to see Feinstein rising in respect for this unknown man. Afterward, Feinstein explained that "this man has established Torah in America."

For the next 35 years, Kaminetsky traveled throughout the United States with a mission to establish a Jewish day school in every town and city across America with a Jewish population of at least 5,000. Upon retiring in 1980 at the age of 69, he moved to Jerusalem with his wife Selma.

Kaminetsky published his memoirs in March 1995, entitled Memorable Encounters: A Torah pioneer's glimpses of great men and years of challenge.

== Family ==
His son, Rabbi David Kaminetsky, was principal of Manhattan Day School for a decade but left to become the national director of NCSY, a post he left in 2002.

His daughter Nechama is married to Rabbi Mayer Steinhardt, both of whom are involved in education. He is also survived by his son Judah and daughter Phyllis, married to Gedalya Riess. His daughter Symie is married to Rabbi Eliezer Liff, who live in Jerusalem and are similarly involved in Jewish education. His wife, Selma, died in July 2010.
