= Talmudical Yeshiva of Philadelphia =

Jewish high school in Philadelphia, Pennsylvania, USA

Location
- 6063 Drexel Rd; Philadelphia, Pennsylvania 19131-1296; United States
- Coordinates: 39°59′21″N 75°14′52″W

Information
- Other names: Philadelphia Yeshiva; Yeshiva Gedolah of Philadelphia
- Religious affiliation: Judaism
- Denomination: Lithuanian Haredi
- Established: 1953
- CEEB code: 393532
- NCES School ID: 01195981
- Faculty: 7.8 (on an FTE basis)
- Grades: 9–12
- Enrollment: 107 (2019-2020)
  - Grade 9: 26
  - Grade 10: 26
  - Grade 11: 25
  - Grade 12: 30
- Student to teacher ratio: 1:13.7
- Hours in school day: 11
- Campus type: Large city
- Colors: Cardinal & White

The Talmudical Yeshiva of Philadelphia (Yiddish: פילאדעלפיע ישיבה) is a Haredi Litvish yeshiva in the Overbrook neighborhood of Philadelphia, Pennsylvania. Its heads of school are Rabbi Shmuel Kamenetsky, Rabbi Shimon Yehudah Svei and Rabbi Sholom Kaminetsky.

== History ==
The yeshiva was founded in 1953 at the behest of Rabbi Aaron Kotler, the Rosh Yeshiva of Beth Medrash Govoha in Lakewood, New Jersey. Rabbis Shmuel Kamenetsky and Dov Schwartzman first headed the yeshiva. The yeshiva's first location was at 3003 W Berks Street in the Strawberry Mansion neighborhood of Philadelphia. Dedication ceremonies for the new yeshiva were held on June 10, 1954 at the Paramount Mansion, Broad Street and Girard Avenue.

The yeshiva purchased a building at 6040 Drexel Road in Overbrook in August 1955 and expanded its dormitories, eating facilities, classrooms, and library. Enrollment numbered 22 students in 1955. The same year, Rabbi Schwartzman left the yeshiva and was replaced by Rabbi Elya Svei. On May 1, 1955, the Yeshiva held its first annual banquet at the Davis Caterers, 1400 W Girard, and featured as speakers Rabbi Leo Jung and Irving Bunim.

From 1965 until 1985, Rabbi Yisrael Mendel Kaplan was one of the yeshiva's senior lecturers.

Hyman Korman, a Philadelphia home builder and philanthropist, was an early supporter of the yeshiva. Following his passing, the yeshiva's board voted in November 1970 to name its high school in memory of Korman. With the financial assistance of the Chevra Bnai Moshe, the yeshiva opened new laboratories for chemistry, physics, and biology in 1971. Enrollment had grown to 175 students in 1975.

In September 1975, the B'nai Sholom Synagogue at 4850 N 7th Street closed and dissolved itself. Working with Rabbi Kamenetsky, the synagogue donated $4,000 to the yeshiva, and its dedication and memorial plaques relocated to the yeshiva's building in Overbrook.

== School structure ==
The yeshiva had 210 students in 1987 of which 110 were in grades 9 through 12.

The yeshiva currently consists of a high school of about 100 students in four grade levels and a beit midrash for the continuing education of college-aged students. Both the high school and beit midrash curriculums are weighted heavily towards Talmudic studies, although the high school provides its graduates with a fully accredited secular education. Most of the student body hails from outside the state, mainly from the New York City area, and virtually all students live in the dormitory near the main buildings.

The yeshiva provides its students with a strong background in Talmudic and Rabbinical studies. Many of its graduates choose to continue to other yeshivas and higher places of Jewish learning. Historically, a minority of students continue their studies in undergraduate and graduate schools across the United States.

Rav Avrohom Golombeck served as the institution's mashgiach until his death in July 2008. Rav Yisroel Dick succeeded him in the position in March 2010.

== Notable alumni ==
- Rabbi Yechiel Perr
- Rabbi Yosef Mermelstein
- Rabbi Mordechai Kamenetsky
- Shimon Glick
