= Yeshiva Gedolah Zichron Moshe =

Coordinates: 41.72569°N 74.624966°W

- South Fallsburg, New York; United States

Information
- Established: 1944; 82 years ago
- Founder: Yerucham Gorelick
- Rosh yeshiva: Elya Ber Wachtfogel
- Enrollment: 200 (2020)
- Website: yeshivathzichronmoshe.com

Yeshiva Gedolah Zichron Moshe, also known as Yeshiva of South Fallsburg, is a private yeshiva in South Fallsburg, New York. It is considered one of the leading beit midrash (undergraduate-level) programs in the United States, maintaining a "steady" enrollment of approximately 200 students. As an Orthodox rabbinical college, all students are male.

Known colloquially as "Fallsburg", its students come from all over the United States, Europe and Israel. Following a stint in Fallsburg, students usually spend time in Israel, ideally in one of the many Brisker institutions there. Rabbi Avraham Yehoshua Soloveitchik, rosh yeshiva of Yeshivas Brisk in Jerusalem, is known to accept a high percentage of Fallsburg's graduates.

The yeshiva is accredited by the Association of Advanced Rabbinical and Talmudic Schools, and offers the bachelor's degree as well as first professional certification.

== History ==
The yeshiva was first established as a cheder for elementary-age students in the Bronx in 1944 by Rabbi Yerucham Gorelick. Gorelick had been a faculty member of Yeshiva University for 40 years, and was a former student of the Radin Yeshiva. The cheder was named Yeshiva Zichron Moshe after Moshe Alexander Gross, a U.S. navy recruit who had been killed during the Normandy landings and whose parents, Isaac and Regina Gross, provided funds to memorialize him. By 1958, the cheder enrolled some 300 students. Gorelick also established a girls' elementary school in the Bronx called Beth Jacob Beth Miriam, which eventually enrolled 550 students.

In 1969, Gorelick decided to open a yeshiva gedolah (high school) in South Fallsburg, New York, then a rural hamlet, and purchased the Laurel Park Hotel for this purpose. The yeshiva opened under the name Yeshiva Gedola L'Mitzuyanim. This name was later changed to Yeshiva Zichron Moshe of South Fallsburg. The high school was led by Gorelick's son, Rabbi Tzvi Abba Gorelick. In 1971, Rabbi Tzvi Abba Gorelick brought in Rabbi Elya Ber Wachtfogel, son of Rabbi Nosson Meir Wachtfogel, the previous mashgiach ruchani of the Lakewood Yeshiva, to fill the position of maggid shiur. Wachtfogel eventually took over as rosh yeshiva, a position he holds to this day.

As of 2020, the yeshiva has been supplemented by a cheder, a mesivta (secondary school), and a kollel. Most of the 100 families who reside in South Fallsburg year-round are affiliated with the kollel or work in the schools or administrative offices there.

== Leadership and staff ==
The rosh yeshiva (dean), Rabbi Elya Ber Wachtfogel, gives the primary shiur. Along with the rosh yeshiva is Rabbi Isser Zalman Gorelick, himself a student of the rosh yeshiva, who gives a small shiur to younger students. The staff is supplemented by Rabbi Meir Kraweic, author of Meirei Lev, Rabbi Avrohom Nosson Rosengarten, Rabbi Chaim Gershon Berzansky, Rabbi Reuven Jurakanski, Rabbi Eliyahu Zalman Levovitz and Rabbi Avrohom Miller. Kraweic serves both as a shoel umeishiv during second seder, and gives a chabura once a week during morning seder. Rosengarten and Berzansky serve as shoel umeishiv for the second seder, and they give chaburos once a week to the older and younger students respectively Jurakanski is also a shoel umeishiv for second seder. Miller is shoel umeishiv during first seder. Levovitz is shoel umeishiv for night seder.
