= Jewish Center (Manhattan) =

Orthodox synagogue in New York City

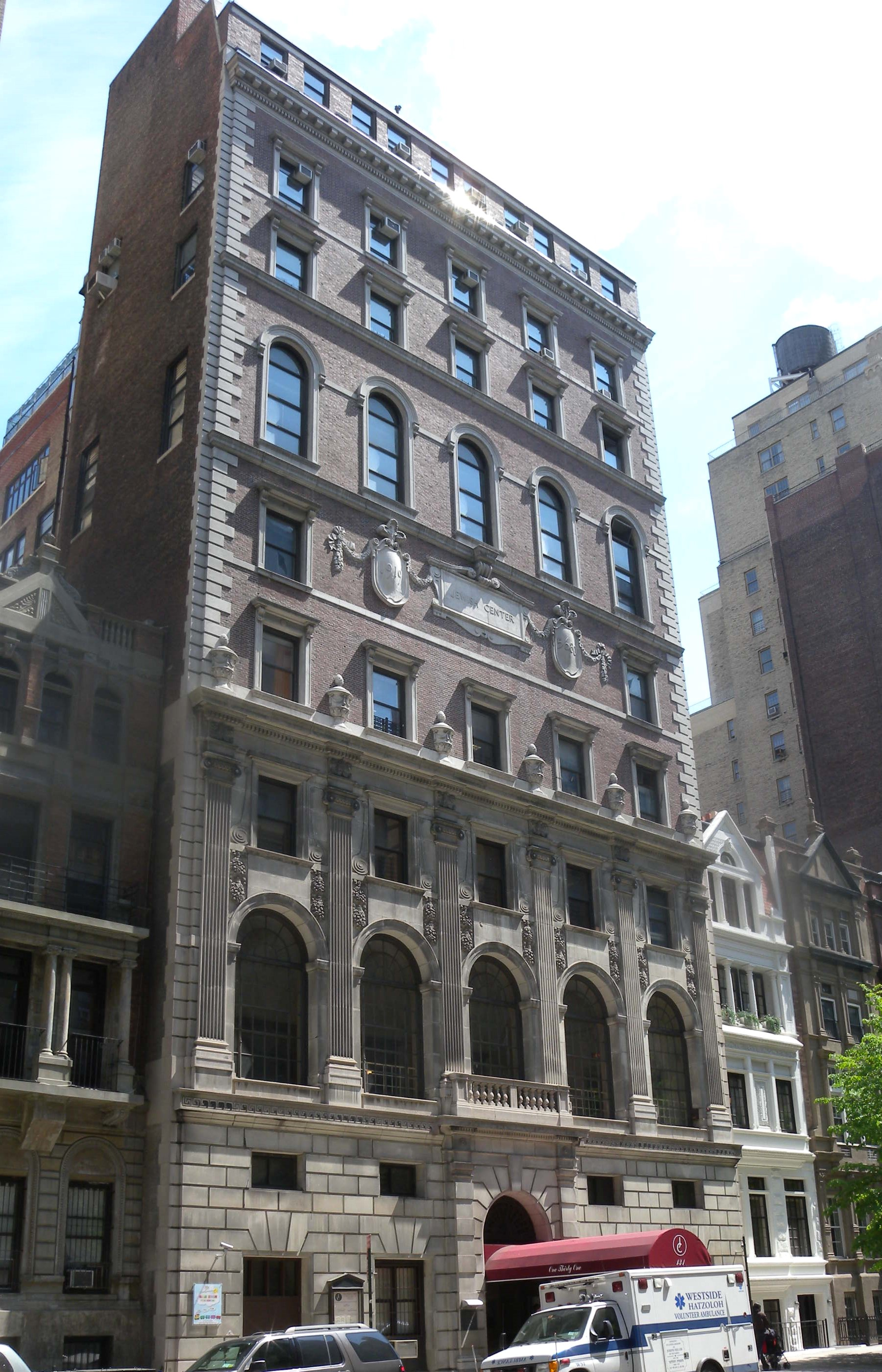
- The façade of the Jewish Center

- Location in Manhattan

Religion
- Affiliation: Modern Orthodox Judaism
- Ecclesiastical or organisational status: Synagogue
- Leadership: Rabbi Dr Yosie Levine; Rabbi Yehuda Goldberg, Asst Rabbi; Jonathan Green, Cantor
- Status: Active

Location
- Location: 131 West 86th Street, Upper West Side, Manhattan, New York City, New York 10024
- Country: United States
- Coordinates: 40°47′14″N 73°58′24″W

Architecture
- Type: Synagogue
- Style: Neo-Classical
- Established: 1918 (as a congregation)
- Completed: 1918

Website
- jewishcenter.org

The Jewish Center is a Modern Orthodox Jewish synagogue at 131 West 86th Street, on the Upper West Side of Manhattan, in New York City, New York, United States.

== History ==
The synagogue was founded in 1918 by prosperous Jews moving into the Upper West Side of Manhattan, a neighborhood that was just being built along the new IRT subway line. As there was no Ashkenazi synagogue that could meet their needs, the Jews moving there decided to build a traditional Orthodox Synagogue in their neighborhood. The large synagogue is in a tall Neo-Classical building at 131 West 86th Street that contains a large number of social halls, classrooms, auditoriums and offices in addition to the Neo-Classical main sanctuary. The synagogue was the first in America to be built not only to serve as spiritual home to its members, but also as a cultural, social and recreational home. The synagogue's members affectionately refer to the synagogue as "The first Shul with a Pool." It continues to support a variety of educational and social programming.

On Tisha B'Av, July 23, 2026, a congregant who had been attending services to mark the solemn fast day was one of two victims of the 2026 Upper West Side stabbing attack, and was stabbed in the chest with a screwdriver by a perpetrator who was said to be shouting "Allahu Akhbar" during the incident.

== Clergy ==
The first rabbi was Mordecai Kaplan, who left in 1921 because his positions were too reform oriented and radical for the Orthodox congregation. The congregation then hired Rabbi Dr. Leo Jung, who later became involved in the founding and support of almost every major Orthodox organization in the United States and abroad, including the Union of Orthodox Hebrew Congregations, Agudath Israel, Torah Umesorah, Bais Yaakov movement (in Poland and the United States) and Chabad. Following Rabbi Jung's retirement and assumption of the role of Rabbi Emeritus, Rabbi Dr. Norman Lamm, later president of Yeshiva University, took over the pulpit in 1959. The fourth rabbi was Rabbi Isaac Bernstein, an Irish scholar. Rabbi Jacob J. Schacter was rabbi from 1981 to 2000, and now serves as Senior Scholar at The Center for the Jewish Future at Yeshiva University. Rabbi Dr. Ari Berman, founding rabbi of The Jewish Center Young Leadership minyan, and who became the fifth president of Yeshiva University in 2017, was the sixth rabbi of the Center before making aliyah in 2008.

The current rabbi, since June 2008, is Rabbi Dr. Yosie Levine, an alumnus of Columbia University and Rabbi Isaac Elchanan Theological Seminary. He served as Rabbinic Intern, Assistant Rabbi and Associate Rabbi, before becoming rabbi when Rabbi Berman made aliyah. He is currently the co-chair of the Manhattan Eruv, and is active in numerous communal organizations including AIPAC, the Beth Din of America and UJA-Federation of New York, where he is a former Board Member.
