= Berel Wein =

American rabbi (1934–2025)

Rabbi Berel Wein ברל ויין

Personal life
- Born: March 25, 1934 Chicago, Illinois, U.S.
- Died: August 16, 2025 (aged 91) Jerusalem, Israel
- Buried: Mount of Olives, Jerusalem
- Spouse: Yocheved (Jackie) Levin (m. 1955; died 2006) Mira Cohen Wein (died 2018)
- Parents: Zev Wein (1906-2004) (father); Esther (mother)
- Education: Roosevelt University; DePaul University

Religious life
- Religion: Judaism
- Yeshiva: Yeshiva Shaarei Torah of Rockland
- Position: Rosh yeshiva (dean)
- Began: 1977
- Ended: 1997
- Other: Senior faculty member, Yeshiva Ohr Somayach
- Yahrtzeit: 22 Av 5785

Berel Wein (Hebrew: ברל ויין; March 25, 1934 – August 16, 2025) was an American-born Orthodox rabbi, lecturer and writer. He authored several books, in both Hebrew and English, concerning Jewish history and popularized the subject through more than 1,000 audio tapes, newspaper articles and international lectures. Throughout his career, he retained personal and ideological ties to both Modern Orthodox and Haredi Judaism.

== Early life ==
Berel Wein was born March 25, 1934, in Chicago, Illinois, to a family descended from distinguished Lithuanian rabbis. His father, Rabbi Zev Wein (1906–2004), was a student of Rabbi Shimon Shkop, and Rabbi Abraham Isaac Kook at Mercaz HaRav in Jerusalem before serving as a rabbi in Chicago for over 50 years. Wein grew up as the only child on a block with many Jewish children, though he was the only one who was Sabbath observant.

A pivotal moment in his youth occurred in 1946 when Chief Rabbi Isaac HaLevi Herzog visited his yeshiva in Chicago. Rabbi Herzog wept openly over 10,000 Jewish children who had been baptized and would not be returned by the Pope, challenging the students: "What are you going to do for the children of Klal Yisrael?". Wein later stated that this question haunted him every time he felt tired or considered ending his work.

Wein attended Roosevelt University for his Bachelor's degree and earned a law degree from DePaul University. He received rabbinic ordination (semicha) from Hebrew Theological College (Skokie Yeshiva), which was founded by his maternal grandfather, Rabbi Chaim Tzvi Rubinstein. His main teacher was Rabbi Chaim Kreiswirth and his personal mentors there included Rabbis Mordechai Rogow and Yisrael Mendel Kaplan. He was a student of Rabbi Oscar Z. Fasman in Chicago, at whose funeral he spoke.

== Career ==
After passing the Illinois Bar, Wein practiced as an attorney in Chicago for nine years. He eventually chose to leave the legal field to pursue the rabbinate, a move supported by his wife, Jacki, who believed it would lead to a more fulfilled life. Wein later reflected that his legal experience was invaluable to his rabbinic career because it gave him a grounded understanding of human nature and the daily struggles of his congregants.

In 1964, he moved to Miami Beach, Florida, to lead Beth Israel Congregation. During his eight-year tenure, the congregation grew from 39 families to 250. While in Miami, he forged relationships with visiting Torah giants, including the Satmar Rebbe, Rabbi Yoel Teitelbaum, and the Ponevezher Rav.

In 1972, Wein was appointed executive vice president of the Orthodox Union (OU) in New York City. Following the sudden death of Rabbi Alexander Rosenberg, Wein took over the Kashrut Supervision Division, serving as its rabbinic administrator until 1977. He is credited with transforming kosher supervision in North America, creating professional, corruption-free standards, and successfully integrating the OU into the meat industry. One of his hallmarks was a plaque in his office with the words "Un vos zogt G-t?" (And what does God think?), a mantra learned from Rabbi Rosenberg.

In 1977, Wein founded Congregation Bais Torah in Suffern, New York, where he served as rabbi for 24 years. That same year, he established Yeshiva Shaarei Torah of Rockland, which featured a large high school and a smaller post-high school division. He served as its Rosh Yeshiva (dean) until his move to Israel in 1997, at which point he was succeeded by his son, Rabbi Chaim Tzvi Wein.

== In Israel ==
Wein and his wife made Aliyah (moved to Israel) in 1997, settling in the Rehavia neighborhood of Jerusalem. He became the rabbi of Bet Knesset Hanasi (Young Israel of Rehavia).

In Israel, he founded The Destiny Foundation, a global multimedia organization created to "resurrect the dying narrative of Jewish history". The foundation became the primary marketing forum for his books, CDs, films, and documentaries. In his later years, the Rabbi Berel Wein Podcast gained worldwide popularity, particularly for his historical perspective on modern crises like the COVID-19 pandemic and the October 7 attacks.

Wein was a senior faculty member of Ohr Somayach Yeshiva in Jerusalem, where he lectured to the mostly English-speaking student body. He also lectured extensively in Israel and abroad, and wrote a regular weekly column for The Jerusalem Post since 1999.

== Works and Teaching ==
Wein is most widely known for his extensive work on Jewish history. He produced over 1,000 audio recordings (originally on cassette tapes) covering 3,700 years of the Jewish story. He explained that these recordings began in Miami Beach when several doctors in his congregation could not attend his live classes and asked for them to be recorded.

His definitive written work is a four-volume series spanning 2,300 years:

1. Echoes of Glory: The story of the Jews in the Classical Era, 350 BCE-750 CE
2. Herald of Destiny: The story of the Jews in the Medieval Era, 750-1650
3. Triumph of Survival: The story of the Jews in the Modern Era, 1650-1990
4. Faith and Fate: The story of the Jewish people in the twentieth century

Wein’s style was noted for its wit, storytelling, and "golden precision" of language. He believed that history was a "rearview mirror" essential for navigating the future. His worldview emphasized Jewish pride, the rejection of "hagiography" in favor of realistic historical struggle, and the centrality of the State of Israel as the future of the Jewish people. He frequently cautioned against high material expectations, arguing that resilience is built on spiritual growth and realism rather than physical comfort.

His sayings and observations have been collected by James Weiss into a 283-page book entitled Vintage Wein: The collected wit and wisdom, the choicest anecdotes and vignettes of Rabbi Berel Wein (Shaar Press, 1992). Since his move to Israel, he has also penned three collections of essays, titled Second Thoughts: A collection of musings and observations (1997), Buy Green Bananas: Observations on self, family and life (1999), and Living Jewish: Values, Practices and Traditions. Tending the Vineyard, is a personal, detailed guide for aspiring pulpit rabbis, in which he shares his philosophy of the rabbinate, and relates first-hand experiences and dispenses advice to rabbinic students.

For a time, Wein published a newsletter, the Wein Press, which he discusses in his 2020 In My Opinion volume, which he published via his Destiny Foundation organization.

== Views ==
Wein sought to present an "unorthodox approach to Orthodoxy," advocating for a confidence that allows Judaism to meet the modern world without succumbing to it.

He was a Religious Zionist who viewed the establishment of Israel as a miraculous event that redefined the Diaspora. He often criticized sections of Orthodoxy for ignoring the religious significance of the State.

He argued that Jewish history should be lived, not just studied, and that every individual is a participant in its unfolding.

In his "In My Opinion" columns, he expressed concerns about the moral footing of Western society and warned that it would become increasingly difficult for Orthodox Jews to maintain themselves in a culture hostile to Torah values.

== Personal life and death ==
In 1955 Wein married Yocheved (Jackie) Levin, who was born in Lithuania in 1934 and emigrated to Detroit with her parents at the age of 4. They had four children, 29 grandchildren and 70 great-grandchildren.

After Yocheved's death in 2006, he married Mira Cohen, a descendent of multiple Chasidic dynasties and a Holocaust survivor, who died in 2018.

Rabbi Berel Wein died in Jerusalem on August 16, 2025, at the age of 91, following a period of declining health. His funeral was held at Beit Knesset Hanassi, and he was buried in the cemetery on the Mount of Olives. In one of his final interviews, when asked what the Jewish world needed most, he replied with a single word: "Positivity".

== Published works ==
=== Hebrew ===
- Chikrei Halacha (1976), published by Mosad Harav Kook
- Eyunim B'Mesechtot HaTalmud (1989) 2 volumes
- Chukei Chaim (1991), edited by his very close disciple Rabbi Harel Kohen
- Bamesila Nale' (2014), edited by Rabbi Harel Kohen ISBN 978-9-65526-172-1

=== English ===
Twenty of his English language books were published by Artscroll; among them are:

- Four-volume series:
  - Echoes of Glory: The Story of the Jews in the Classical Era, 350 BCE-750 CE
  - Herald of Destiny: The Story of the Jews in the Medieval Era, 750-1650 (1993) ISBN 978-0-89906-237-2
  - Triumph of Survival: The Story of the Jews in the Modern Era
  - Faith and Fate: The Story of the Jews in the Twentieth Century
- Living Jewish: Values, Practices and Traditions
- Pirkei Avos: Teachings for Our Times
- The Pesach Haggadah: Through the Prism of Experience and History
- Oral Law of Sinai: An Illustrated History of the Mishna
- Vision & Valor: An Illustrated History of the Talmud
- Jewish History: A Trilogy
- Patterns in Jewish History: Insights into the Past, Present and Future of the Eternal People
- Teach Them Diligently: The Personal Story of a Community Rabbi (Autobiography; 2014)
- In The Footsteps of Eliyahu HaNavi: A historical journey through the countries of our diaspora
- In My Opinion
- Struggles, Challenges And Tradition: How Jewish Communities Defended Orthodoxy 1820-1940

=== Co-authored books ===
- Real Messiah: A Jewish Response to Missionaries by Aryeh Kaplan, Berel Wein, and Pinchas Stolper (1976), ISBN 978-1-879016-11-8
- Sand and Stars (2 vol.) by Yaffa Ganz and Berel Wein (1996), ISBN 978-0-89906-392-8
- The Legacy: Teachings for Life from the Great Lithuanian Rabbis by Warren Goldstein and Berel Wein (2013), ISBN 978-1-592643-62-2

=== DVDs ===
- Rashi – A Light After the Dark Ages (with Leonard Nimoy) (1999)
- Berel Wein's Israel Journey – Jerusalem (co-authored with Wayne Kopping) (2003)
- Rambam – The Story of Maimonides by Leonard Nimoy, Armand Assante, Ashley Lazarus, and Berel Wein (2005)
- Faith & Fate – The Story of the Jewish People in the Twentieth Century Episode II (1911–1920) narrated by Debra Winger and Dick Rodstein (Directed by Ashley Lazarus) (2005) as well as episodes 1,3,4, and 5
