= Schottenstein Edition of the Babylonian Talmud =

Jewish reference book series

The Schottenstein Babylonian Talmud in a synagogue in Raanana, Israel

The Hebrew edition of the Schottenstein Babylonian Talmud

The English edition of the Schottenstein Babylonian Talmud

The Schottenstein Edition of the Babylonian Talmud is a 20th-century, 73-volume edition of the Babylonian Talmud (Talmud Bavli) featuring an elucidated translation and commentary, and published by ArtScroll, a division of Mesorah Publications.

It is the first Orthodox non-academic English translation of the Babylonian Talmud since the Soncino Edition. It has gained much popularity since its release and is used in many congregations throughout the English-speaking world; it is now published in three languages: English, French, and Modern Hebrew.

Rabbis Chaim Malinowitz and Yisroel Simchah Schorr are the general editors of the project. Nothing was considered final until Malinowitz approved the finished drafts.

== History ==
The first volume, Tractate Makkos, was published in 1990, and dedicated by Mr. and Mrs. Marcos Katz. Subsequent editions were produced with the financial assistance of Jerome Schottenstein, an Orthodox Jew and founder of an Ohio department store. The total cost of the project was $40 million (including the Hebrew edition); some sources estimate the cost of production for each volume to be $250,000. The publication of all 73 volumes took 15 years, ending with the publication of the final volume of tractate Yevamot.

In 2020, Agudath Israel of America credited the Schottenstein Edition for a large rise in the number of English-speaking individuals becoming involved in the seven-year-long daf yomi cycle and their participation at the 13th Siyum HaShas, which marked the completion of the full learning sequence.

== Structure ==
Each page of the Hebrew/Aramaic text is in the style of the traditional Vilna Edition Shas, with various classical commentaries (such as Rashi) surrounding the text of the Mishnah and Gemara. Each Hebrew page is opposite a page of English translation—one Hebrew folio takes approximately six to eight pages of English to translate. The literal meaning of the text is shown in bold, while supplementary words and phrases that ease the quick transition of topics are shown in regular font.

The English-language commentary is primarily based on Rashi's, and describes his continuing importance as follows:

It has been our policy throughout the Schottenstein Edition of the Talmud to give Rashi's interpretation as the primary explanation of the Gemara. Since it is not possible in a work of this nature to do justice to all of the Rishonim, we have chosen to follow the commentary most learned by people, and the one studied first by virtually all Torah scholars. In this we have followed the ways of our teachers and the Torah masters of the last nine hundred years, who have assigned a pride of place to Rashi's commentary and made it a point of departure for all other commentaries.

The editors explained further that they chose Ran's commentary for Tractate Nedarim as an exception, based on a belief that the commentary attributed to Rashi for this tractate was not written by Rashi.

== See also ==
- Gemara
- Mishnah
- Soncino Edition of the Babylonian Talmud
- Steinsaltz Talmud
- Talmud
