= South Fallsburg, New York =

- Hamlet and CDP
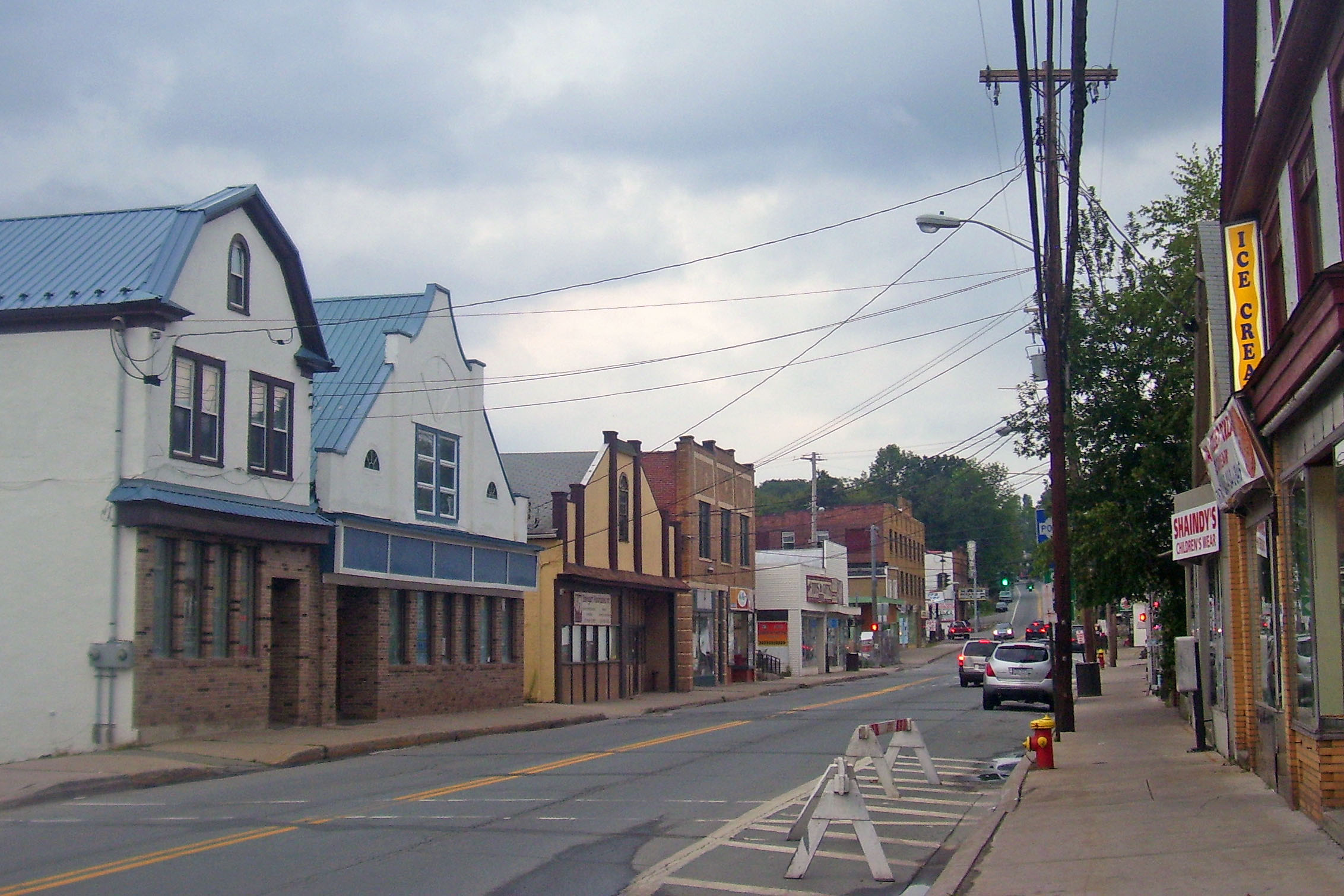
- Downtown looking north along NY 42
- Etymology: South of hamlet of Fallsburg
- Location of South Fallsburg in Sullivan County, New York
- Coordinates: 41°42′32″N 74°37′45″W
- Country: United States
- State: New York
- Region: Catskills
- County: Sullivan

Area
  - Total: 3.51 sq mi (9.10 km^{2})
  - Land: 3.19 sq mi (8.25 km^{2})
  - Water: 0.33 sq mi (0.85 km^{2})

Population (2020)
  - Total: 2,347
  - Density: 736.7/sq mi (284.45/km^{2})
- Time zone: UTC-5 (Eastern (EST))
  - Summer (DST): UTC-4 (EDT)
- ZIP Code: 12779
- Area code: 845
- FIPS code: 36-68968
- GNIS feature ID: 1867418

South Fallsburg is a hamlet and census-designated place in Sullivan County, New York, United States. As of the 2020 census, South Fallsburg had a population of 2,347. South Fallsburg is located within the Town of Fallsburg at 41°42′59″N 74°37′49″W (41.716489, -74.630279).

== History ==
South Fallsburg is located in the one-time resort area of the Catskill Mountains known as the Borscht Belt. The Raleigh Hotel on Heiden Road is a 320-room Glatt Kosher Cholov Yisrael hotel for Hasidic Jews sitting on 200 acres (0.81 km^{2}); it also serves as a convention center for religious and nonreligious groups. The Rivoli Theatre and South Fallsburg Hebrew Association Synagogue are listed on the National Register of Historic Places. The town is home to a center of Siddha Yoga, the Shree Muktananda Ashram of the SYDA Foundation.

== Demographics ==
Historical population
Census	Pop.	Note	%±
2020	2,347		—
U.S. Decennial Census

As of the 2010 United States census, there were 2,870 people, 909 households, and 606 families residing in South Fallsburg. There were 1,385 housing units. The racial makeup of the CDP included 63.7% White and 14.2% African American. Hispanic or Latino of any race were 38.5% of the population. Families including a husband and a wife made up 38.8% of the population. As of 2023, an estimated 34.3% of residents were below the poverty level.

== Notable people ==
South Fallsburg is home to singer-songwriters Gavin and Joey DeGraw, librarian Sari Feldman, jazz pianist and composer Kenny Werner, and Yeshiva Gedolah Zichron Moshe.
