= South Fallsburg Hebrew Association Synagogue =

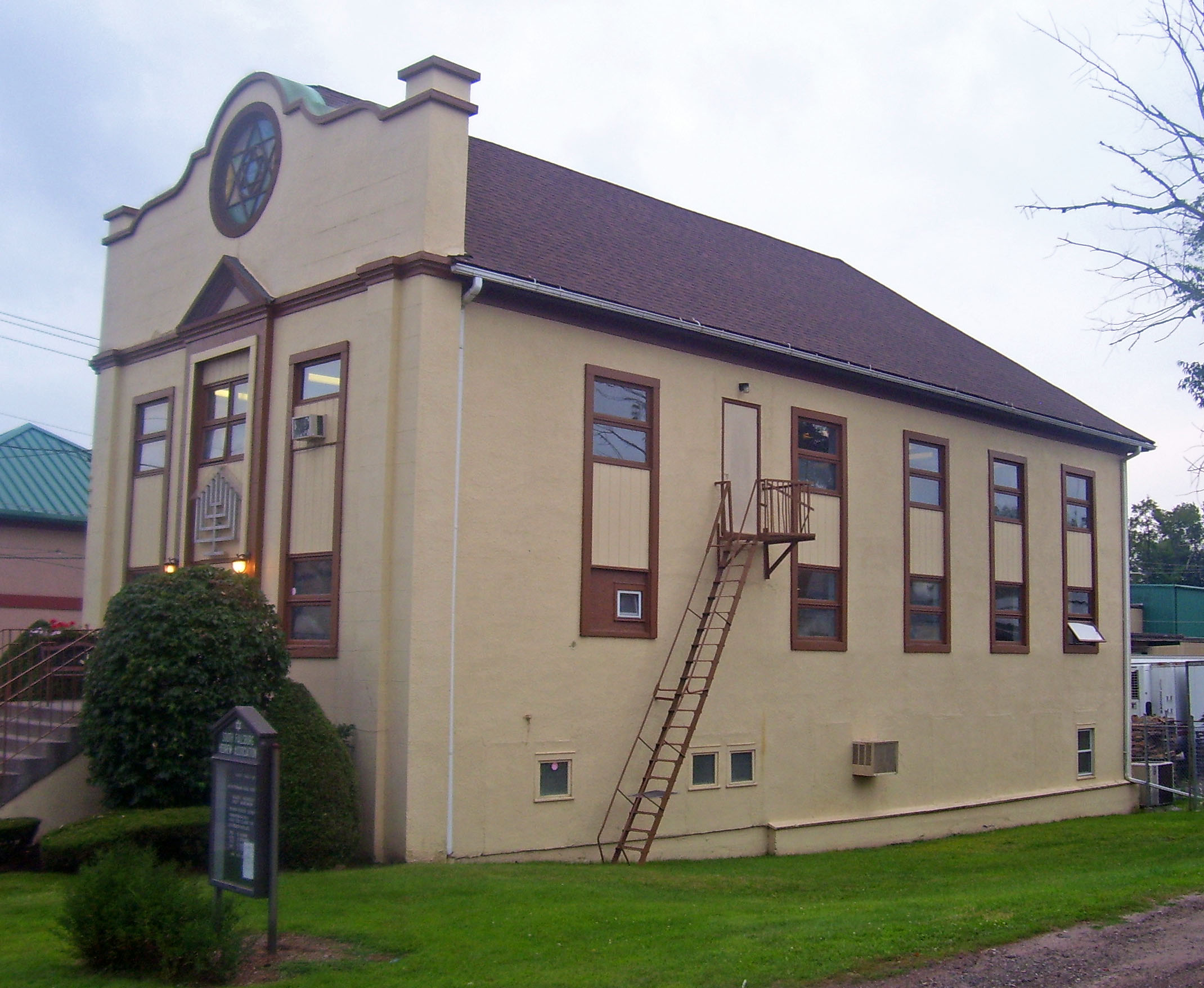
- West profile and north elevation, 2008

- Location in New York

Religion
- Affiliation: Orthodox Judaism
- Rite: Nusach Ashkenaz
- Ecclesiastical or organisational status: Synagogue
- Leadership: Lay-led
- Status: Active

Location
- Location: Lake Street, South Fallsburg, Sullivan County, New York
- Country: United States
- Coordinates: 41°42′25″N 74°37′49″W

Architecture
- Type: Synagogue architecture
- Style: Neoclassical
- Established: 1902 (as a congregation)
- Completed: 1902

Specifications
- Direction of façade: North
- Materials: Concrete, stucco

Website
- South Fallsburg Hebrew Association SFHA
- South Fallsburg Hebrew Association Synagogue
- U.S. National Register of Historic Places
- NRHP reference No.: 00001410
- Added to NRHP: 2000

The South Fallsburg Hebrew Association Synagogue is a historic Orthodox Jewish congregation and synagogue, located on Lake Street in the hamlet of South Fallsburg, New York, in the United States.

Built in 1902, the synagogue underwent an expansion in 1919 that included being raised a story. In 2000, it was listed on the National Register of Historic Places.

== Overview ==
It is one of the oldest synagogues in Sullivan County, and has played a central role the region's Jewish community, with some notable Jews having been members of the congregation. It is a strictly Orthodox congregation, but welcomes all Jews regardless of their level of observance. After the decline of the area's signature hotel industry with the growth of cluster communities with homes suitable for use year round the synagogue has become the focal point for the town's Jewish religious and cultural activities. The congregation no longer employs a rabbi and holds no services or programs. The synagogue up until recently had daily minyanim year round and a vibrant Kollel is mostly closed and not functioning as a strictly Orthodox synagogue. The synagogue has fired 4 rabbis since they fired Rabbi Barros. The Synagogue is an open orthodox synagogue. As of 3/26/24 this synagogue is closed. The old (few)membership does not welcome the local orthodox people living in the area all year round.

== Building ==
The synagogue is a one-story three-by-five-bay on a raised basement. The slight slope of the site exposes the basement walls on the rear and sides. It is sided in gold stucco topped with an asphalt-shingled hipped roof, partially obscured by the parapets of the north (front) facade.

Concrete stairs with iron railings and brick newels lead up to the entrance, flanked by two windows, wooden surrounds and a cornice with a small pediment. At the outer edges, wooden pilasters with Doric capitals rise from basement to cornice. The entire facade is topped by a Spanish Baroque-inspired parapet, within which a stained glass window depicts one Star of David nested in another.

The sides feature narrow, flat windows in each bay. On the east is a shed-roofed ground-level entrance and concrete block chimney; opposite is a metal fire escape. The rear has a projecting middle bay (the Torah ark on the inside) plus two similar windows.

Inside, the synagogue uses all three of its floors. The main floor is devoted to the sanctuary, where the bimah is unusually placed in the rear, near the ark, rather than the center as is customary in Orthodox synagogues. The ark itself is separated from the bimah by sliding wooden doors and illuminated by stained glass depicting the Burning bush; two backlit panels show the Ten Commandments. The ceiling is the original pressed metal.

A women's gallery and some classrooms are located on the third level. The basement is a large community room used for ceremonies and gatherings; it has a sukkah of knotty pine paneling with a retractable bamboo ceiling.

== History ==
As the 19th century yielded to the 20th, Jewish immigrants began coming to the southern Catskill Mountains to stay at, and later operate, summer resort communities. There were enough in South Fallsburg to build the synagogue, originally known as Ahavas Achim, in 1902. Its design owed much to the congregants' memory of synagogues in the Eastern European countries many had originally emigrated from. All Jews were welcome to join regardless of whether they were Orthodox or not.

In 1910, the congregation changed its name to the South Fallsburg Hebrew Association (SFHA), reflecting its function as a center for local Jews regardless of religious sect. It bought and operated a local secular Yiddish school. Enough Jews had made South Fallsburg their permanent home after vacationing there that the synagogue held weekly meetings year-round. Members were prosperous enough to begin banking money for synagogue expansions, and in 1919 the building was elevated to build a Talmud Torah school in the new basement. A women's gallery was added and the building was elongated to accommodate the growing congregation. At this time a new ark was also built.

Throughout the middle decades of the century, the synagogue served one of the region's most active and prosperous Jewish communities. In 1959, all the local firefighters were also members of SFHA. Its members included notable Jews like two-time Oscar-winning songwriter Sammy Fain and influential Israeli rabbi Nachman Bulman. In the 1970s, the interior was remodeled, with Jewish folk art that had hung from the balustrade by the women's gallery removed to project an image of greater sophistication. The original stained glass window was replaced at this time as well.

In December 2004, Rabbi Isaac Gotlieb was fired from the synagogue. Gotlieb continued giving sermons, represented himself as the rabbi of the synagogue, and continued to write letters on the synagogue's letterhead. The synagogue said Gotlieb was causing "animosity, dissension and confusion" in order to ruin the reputation of the synagogue, and it sued Gotlieb to prevent him from representing himself as the synagogue's rabbi and from entering the building. The lawsuit was settled out of court.
