= Torah Umesorah =

Network of Jewish Orthodox schools

- Torah Umesorah – National Society for Hebrew Day Schools
- תורה ומסורה
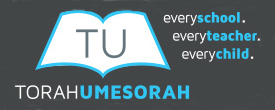
- Location: United States
- Director: Rabbi David Nojowitz

Torah Umesorah (תורה ומסורה) is a Haredi Orthodox Jewish educational charity based in the United States that promotes Torah-based Jewish religious education in North America by supporting and developing a loosely affiliated network independent private Jewish day schools.

In the early 21st century, some 760 day schools teach more than 250,000 children. Torah Umesorah has established yeshivas and kollelim in every city with a significant population of Jews. Rabbi Joshua Fishman served from 1980 as executive vice-president until his retirement in June 2007. The current Menahel ("principal") or national director, is Rabbi David Nojowitz.

== History ==
Torah Umesorah, the National Society for Hebrew Day Schools, was the first national Jewish organization in the United States to pioneer Jewish day schools within the country. It started to develop these in 1944, during World War II and at a time when the United States was at war with the Axis powers and Europe's Jews were being consumed by the Nazi genocide of the Holocaust. Challenging the prevailing mood of the times, Rabbi Shraga Feivel Mendlowitz and other rabbis founded Torah Umesorah to develop a network of Jewish day schools across North America.

Rabbi Mendlowitz was born in Hungary and was then serving as the head of the Yeshiva Torah Vodaas in Brooklyn, New York. He selected Dr. Joseph Kaminetsky in 1945 as the first full-time Director; Kaminetsky was given the mandate to fulfill the vision of the founding rabbis. He served until 1980, overseeing the establishment of Orthodox day schools at hundreds of sites across the country; he is considered the most influential leader of Torah Umesorah. He had a doctorate from Columbia Teachers College.

In 1944 there were few Orthodox Jewish day schools in the United States, let alone Haredi yeshivas or Beis Yaakov schools. The afternoon/Talmud Torah system was deemed "failing to transmit Yiddishkeit in a compelling manner to students who arrived tired in the afternoons and were constantly subjected to assimilationist influences in American culture."

By the end of the twentieth century, Torah Umesorah had developed more than 600 yeshivas and day schools in the United States and Canada, enrolling more than 170,000 Jewish students. The organization's motto is "the children are the future," or in Hebrew, יש עתיד.

== Planning Torah Umesorah ==
The founders of Torah Umesorah wanted to establish a different model of education. At the time, Jewish parents generally sent their children to non-sectarian public schools during the day. In the afternoons or on Sundays they would send the children to Cheder or Talmud Torah-type Jewish-run schools for religious training, as had been the tradition in Europe. Parents feared that in North America, this approach was failing to transmit Judaism in a compelling and lasting manner. Students went to Jewish classes when tired in the afternoons. They were subject to the secularizing forces in their mixed communities, encountering the larger American society and culture in public school, on the street, and at home. There were only four or five Jewish day schools outside New York City.

The rabbis intended their new school system to have a dual-curriculum: Jewish day schools would provide a Judaic (Jewish or Torah religious) education for half the day and a good secular education in classical subjects, all in one building or complex. They planned for each new school to be guided by an ordained rabbi who would serve as the headmaster or principal. He would recruit a "general studies" associate principal (also known as the "English principal"), preferably someone who was also loyal to the traditions of Judaism. The associate would recruit, assist, supervise and guide the teachers who would teach the secular subjects generally taught in the public schools.

== Post-war conditions ==
American Jews were shocked as they learned the overwhelming scale of Jewish deaths due to the Holocaust of World War II; six million Jews had been killed, and the great European Jewish communities and Torah centers destroyed. Many American Jews had lost relatives in Europe. In addition, more than half a million United States Jews had served in the US armed forces; some participated in the liberation of the concentration camps, or worked with the millions of displaced people in camps after the war, including Jews trying to find out if any of their families had survived.

Many American Jews were sympathetic to the rabbis' appeals to ensure a moderate Jewish education for their children, at least until the Bar Mitzvah age (12-13). In addition, most Jews in the United States felt pride when the new State of Israel was established, due in part to fierce fighting by the many European Zionist Jews who had immigrated there when it was Mandate Palestine. The United States was the first nation to officially recognize the new Jewish state. With a renewed commitment to Judaism, American Jews wanted to ensure that their children learned the Hebrew language, connected with the core of Judaism and religious studies, and had the opportunity to learn secular subjects at a high level.

The new Jewish days schools were believed to be a means to accomplish the new goals of all-day Jewish schooling—or, all-day schooling under Jewish religious auspices. Parents believed that having their children study in the Cheders and Talmud Torahs had failed to gain their commitment to Judaism and practicing as religious adults.

After Torah Umesorah was established, and its affiliated schools were attracting students, the parents of its students were encouraged to enroll them in Jewish high schools, to maintain students' commitment to Judaism. Transferring Jewish students to public high schools in adolescence was considered a risk, as they were subject to many outside influences.

== Other Orthodox efforts ==
In the New York-New Jersey metropolitan area, particularly in many areas of Brooklyn, various Hasidic and Haredi groups (such as Satmar, Bobov, Vizhnitz and many others) also attracted many new supporters for yeshiva education, which was more intensively Torah-based than the Jewish day school model being promoted by Torah Umesorah. Notable was Merkos L'inyonei Chinuch, which was founded in 1942 by Rabbi Yosef Yitzchak Schneerson, the Lubavitcher Rebbe.

Holocaust survivors who immigrated to the United States in the postwar years were often strong supporters of the Orthodox Jewish day schools. They wanted their children to identify as Jews and practice the religion so that it could continue. For instance, the Lithuanian Mir yeshiva had no wish to emulate the educational goals of secular (Jewish) society. They sent their children of high school age to yeshivas (for the boys) and Beis Yaakovs (for the girls); most of the curriculum was devoted entirely to Talmud and rabbinical literature (for the boys) and study of Tanakh and Jewish laws and customs (for the girls). These were combined with fervent Jewish worship. The new institutions thrived in their own right and mostly followed the guidelines of their own rosh yeshivas and rebbes.

=== Late 20th century to present ===
As noted, Dr. Joe Kaminetsky served from 1945 until 1980 as operational head of Torah Umesorah. In 1945 when there were few Jewish day schools outside New York City. In 1946 New York had an estimated 7,000 students in 27 yeshivos of various sizes, and there was one yeshiva in each of Baltimore, Chicago, and Jersey City.

By the time of his death in 1999, Kaminetsky had set up hundreds of Jewish day schools across the country, in which 160,000 children were enrolled.

Rabbi Joshua Fishman succeeded Kaminetsky, and served as executive vice-president until retiring in June 2007. He was a disciple of Rabbi Yitzchok Hutner (1906–1980), who was among the leaders of Agudath Israel of America.

The current Menahel ("principal") or national director, is Rabbi David Nojowitz. He returned to the United States to take this position after having served as Rosh Kollel in Melbourne, Australia, for 25 years. In 2008 Torah Umesorah had an annual budget of $39 million; this was "the last year for which it made its tax documents public."

Toward the latter part of the twentieth century, Torah Umesorah officials found that teachers and rabbis from the Haredi and Hasidic schools were consulting with its staff for training to improve classroom management, enhance classroom discipline and learn up-to-date teaching skills and techniques which they often did not receive during yeshiva training. They began to set up regular classes for training of teachers and principals.

Torah Umesorah has worked to find funding to establish kollelim ("post-graduate" Talmudic schools) in any community that is willing to set up the infrastructure and host such efforts. Some young rabbis and rebbetzins (their wives) have taken full- and part-time positions as Jewish educators in the local day schools. They also frequently serve in local Orthodox synagogues as "pulpit rabbis." In some instances they have founded new Jewish day schools and synagogues of their own.

== Relationship with Modern Orthodox groups ==
By the 1980s and 1990s, some Modern Orthodox communities pushed to establish day school-type Jewish high schools. However, Torah Umesorah's rabbinical board of advisers, who are also the core of the Haredi Agudath Israel of America rabbinic leadership, do not condone coeducation beyond the beginning of adolescence (or earlier). Most Jewish day schools have both boys and girls as students, with some, but not all, classes conducted separately. Nevertheless, the Haredi rabbis of Torah Umesorah did not approve of co-ed high schools.

The rabbis and the rosh yeshivas prefer that boys who graduate eighth grade continue in all-male traditional yeshivas ("Talmudical academies") and girls study at Beis Yaakov ("Beth Jacob") type schools. Modern Orthodox schools are served by Prizmah: Center for Jewish Day Schools, which also services Community (or Pluralistic), Conservative, and Reform day schools; and by the Torah Educators Network, which also services yeshivish schools.

== Partners in Torah ==
Under the guidance of Rabbi Eli Gewirtz, Torah Umesorah began a new initiative to promote Jewish adult education. Partners in Torah matches Jewish men and women across the globe who want to study Jewish text or to know more about their heritage with compatible study partners for up to an hour a week of interactive study by phone or Skype and, if possible, in person.

By 2009, the international Partners in Torah had more than 30,000 members, as documented in Gewirtz's book. By July 2017 it had connected over 72,000 Jewish adults for weekly study. In 2017. Partners in Torah became an independent organization and continued to expand its scope.

In early 2019, an anonymous donor challenged Partners in Torah to use technology to drastically increase its reach and impact, reduce costs, and collect data on participant activity. Blessed with a significant grant to support this effort, Partners in Torah successfully launched the first version of a technology platform in early 2020, just before the onset of Covid. The platform, which algorithmically matches participants with a suitable study partner, has a built-in follow-up system and provides real-time, transparent data on participation and satisfaction.

== Project SEED ==
Under Project SEED, yeshiva students (boys and girls in their teens and early 20s) are recruited and sent on two to six-week summer trips to distant smaller Jewish communities, where they teach classes or supervise children in summer day-camps. These may or may not be accredited by a third party association, such as the Western Association of Independent Camps or the American Camping Association. The counselors provide Torah-oriented experience in an environment where they and the campers are strictly separated by gender. Project SEED pays most yeshiva students a stipend to defray much (but not all) of the cost of their stay at their destination, air-fare, room and board, trips and other transportation.

== See also ==
- Agudath Israel of America
- Center for Initiatives in Jewish Education
- Independent school
- Jewish denominations
- Jewish day school
- Jewish fundamentalism
- Parochial school
- Religious education
- Torah Judaism
