= Marsha Stern Talmudical Academy =

Yeshiva University High School for Boys The Marsha Stern Talmudical Academy Manhattan Talmudical Academy
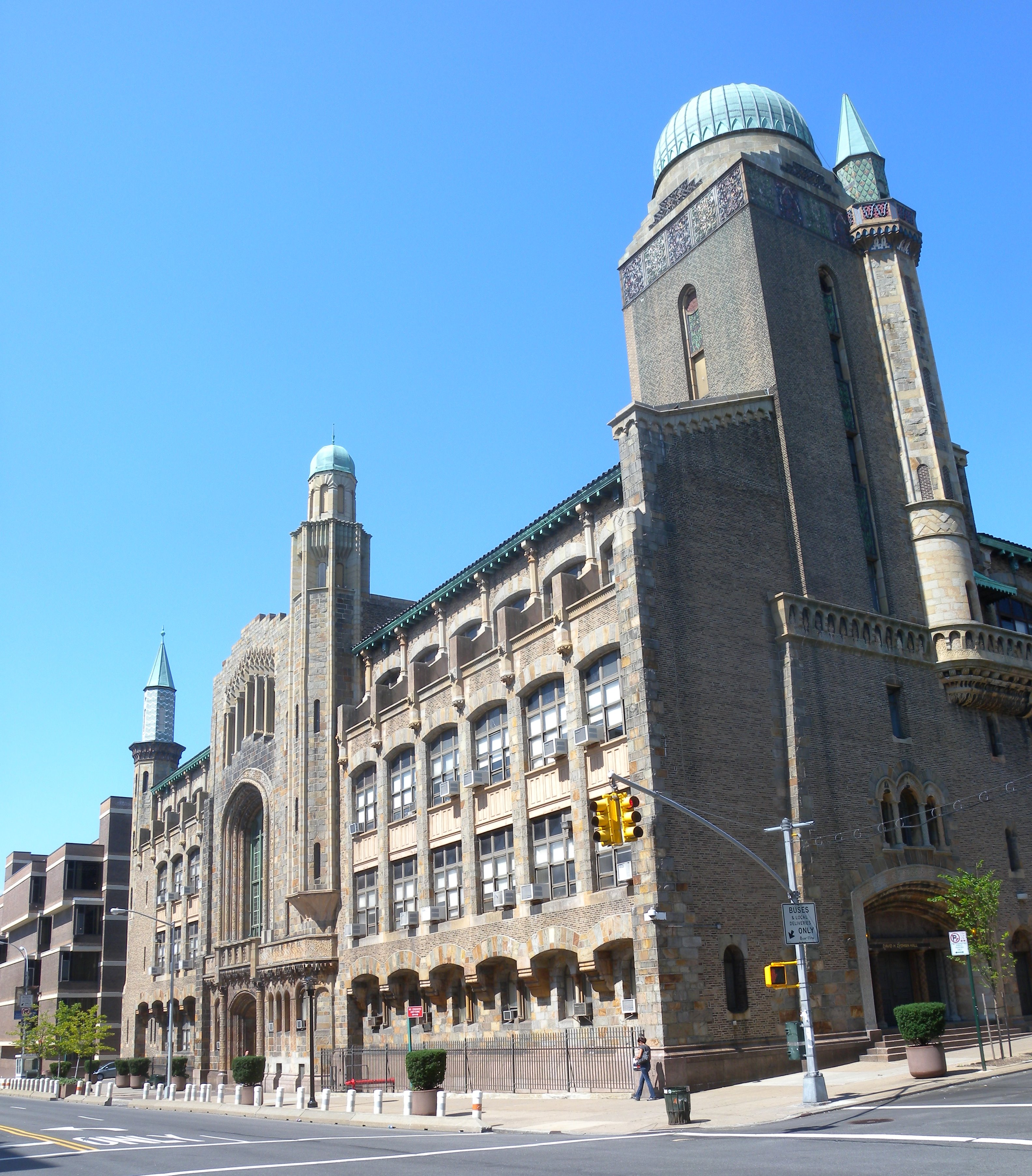

Location
- 2540 Amsterdam Avenue; New York, NY 10033; United States; 40°51′06″N 73°55′42″W

Information
- Type: Private, Yeshiva, Day
- Religious affiliation: Judaism
- Denomination: Modern Orthodox
- Established: 1916
- Sister school: Yeshiva University High School for Girls
- Chairperson: Miriam Goldberg
- Principal: Rabbi Daniel Konigsberg
- Head of School: Rabbi Shimon Schenker
- Faculty: 44.0 (on FTE basis)
- Grades: 9–12
- Gender: Boys
- Enrollment: 300+
- Student to teacher ratio: 6.8:1
- Colors: Blue and White
- Mascot: Lion
- Nickname: Lions
- Accreditation: Middle States Association of Colleges and Schools
- Affiliations: Yeshiva University
- Website: yuhsb.org

The Marsha Stern Talmudical Academy also known as Manhattan Talmudical Academy (MTA), also known as Yeshiva University High School for Boys (YUHSB), is a Modern Orthodox Jewish day school and yeshiva of Yeshiva University. It is located in the Washington Heights neighborhood of Manhattan, New York City. MTA is often regarded as the most historic Jewish high school and is one of the top-ranked high schools in the country.

== History ==
The Talmudical Academy (TA), as it was originally called, was founded in 1916 by Rabbi Dr. Bernard Revel. He had become president of the institution that was to become Yeshiva University a year earlier, in 1915, when the "Rabbinical College of America" (a short-lived name) had been formed from the merger of two older schools, an elementary school founded in 1886 and a rabbinical seminary founded in 1896.

TA was the first academic Jewish high school in America, and the first to have a dual curriculum, now standard in Jewish schools, of Judaic and secular studies. It was originally located on the Lower East Side, and moved to Washington Heights with the rest of Yeshiva in the late 1920s. The building originally planned for the High School alone was shared with the other schools of the University for many years before the campus expanded; today, that building is almost entirely occupied by the High School, and the other buildings of the University's main campus (including a dormitory for college students) surround it.

TA was later joined by a brother school, the Brooklyn Talmudical Academy ("BTA"), founded in the 1940s. Two girls' high schools were founded as well, Central Yeshiva High School in Brooklyn in the 1950s and a Manhattan school in the 1960s.

In 1967, the Brooklyn school moved to a joint campus created by repurposing the historical Vitagraph Studios in the Midwood section of Brooklyn. In the 1970s, they were closed and merged into their Manhattan counterparts. In the 1980s, the girls' school was merged into a Queens school. The latter is now called "Samuel H. Wang Yeshiva University High School for Girls" (or simply "Wang"), but is still commonly referred to as "Central," while the boys' school, since the 1970s, has been known as "The Marsha Stern Talmudical Academy- Yeshiva University High School for Boys" (or simply "TMSTA" or, more recently, "MSTA" and now, "MTA"), but is still commonly referred to as "MTA." Principals of the school included the founding principal, Shelley Safire, and Rabbis David Weinbach (1973-1987), Mordechai Spiegelman (1987-1991), George Finkelstein (1991-1995), Michael Taubes (1995-1999 and 2011-2016), Michael Hecht (1999-2005), Mark Gottlieb and Yaakov Sklar (2005-2011), and Josh Kahn (2016-2023). After the resignation of former Head of School Rabbi Joshua Kahn, Rabbi Shimon Schenker was appointed Menahel of the Yeshiva (school) after an unsuccessful search for an outside hire.

The school's enrollment peaked during the 1960s and 1970s, when relatively few competitor schools existed. However, with the growth of competing institutions, enrollment declined, and by 1999, Rabbi Dr. Norman Lamm, President of Yeshiva University, wanted to close the high school down. When word of the closure leaked out, Rabbi Michael Taubes, MTA's principal at that time, together with senior instructor, Rabbi Yitzchok Cohen, led a student protest and recitation of Psalms in front of the YU's main building at that time, Furst Hall. Although the protest led to Rabbi Taubes' dismissal, and eventually to the dismissal of Cohen as well (both became instructors in other divisions of Yeshiva University, and Rabbi Taubes in 2008 became a teacher at the high school and became principal again in 2011), their action is credited with swaying Rabbi Lamm to keep the school open.

Rabbi Michael Hecht, who had been teaching at the school for many years and also served as a Dean in Yeshiva College, became Dean of MTA. In September 2005, Rabbi Mark Gottlieb assumed the role of Head of School. In February 2011, Rabbi Mark Gottlieb announced that he would be stepping down as Head of School/Menahel at the culmination of the 2010-2011 academic year. His successor was former principal Rabbi Michael Taubes, who took over as Head of School (now also known by the Hebrew title of Rosh HaYeshiva at the start of the 2011-2012 academic year. In March 2016, it was announced that the school's next leader would be Rabbi Joshua Kahn. Rabbi Kahn began his tenure in July 2016. In the 2022/2023 school year, Rabbi Kahn announced his resignation as Head of School. Rabbi Shimon Schenker was promoted to Head of School and Rabbi Daniel Konigsberg was promoted to Principal.

== Sexual Misconduct Allegations ==
In December 2012, a scandal developed alleging widespread sexual misconduct by two high ranking male faculty members and perpetrated on multiple male students. The alleged misconduct, which occurred during the 1970s and 1980s, was claimed to have been known about, but ignored, by the highest levels of administration at the high school and at Yeshiva University. The former president of Yeshiva University issued a statement stating that the university will examine the allegations. The Jewish Week uncovered a story, further alleging knowledge of the inappropriate behavior by the university. The story alleges that the door to one of the abuser's offices was removed to prevent a private environment where further misconduct could continue. The lawsuit against Yeshiva University was dismissed before trial in January 2014 by a federal judge who stated that the statute of limitations had expired. However, when New York State passed its new Child Victims Act in 2019, the suit was refiled by 38 former students.

== Student activities ==
There are many extracurricular activities and clubs. For sports, these include Varsity and Junior Varsity basketball, hockey. Along with wrestling, baseball, softball, and soccer teams. In other areas, there are College Bowl, Torah Bowl, Mock Trial, Model UN, Legal Pathways, Cross Country, Sports Broadcasting (Lions Live), Model Congress, Chess, Debate, MTAhackers (the high school team won the 2022 university hackathon), a 3d printing club, a Math team, as well as the Business is Booming, The Pathway to Pre-med Club, and Finance Club. The Chess team won the Yeshiva League Chess Championship in both 2017 and 2018. The school has 2 robotics teams that participate in the FIRST Tech Challenge (teams 5361 and 13475).The robotic team won the 2025 december competition. The choir is run in connection with the Philip and Sarah Belz School of Jewish Music.

The students publish a number of publications including The Polis (multidisciplinary academic journal), The Academy News (school newspaper), Shema Koleinu (weekly Dvar Torah newsletter), Yagdil Torah (Torah essay journal), HaTzioni (Zionist publication), Pearls of Wisdom (book of students' literary works and, as of 2011, artwork), and the Elchanite (yearbook).

The school organizes international trips for students. In 2004, a group of students spent Shavuot in Belarus in coordination with YUSSR. In 2005, the HaTzioni club, in cooperation with the Palau Mission to the United Nations, arranged a trip for its members to Palau to show the Jewish community's gratitude for Palau's support of Israel.

== Notable alumni ==
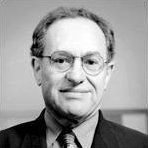
Alan Dershowitz, lawyer, author, and Harvard Law School professor

- Shalom Auslander, author, Foreskin's Lament: A Memoir
- Robert J. Avrech, (BTA), screenwriter, The Devil's Arithmetic
- Assaf Bednarsh, 1989, Rosh Yeshiva
- Ari Berman, (MTA, Class of 1987), current president, Yeshiva University
- Morris J. Besdin, (1931), Rabbi
- Yosef Blau, (1955), Mashgiach Ruchani, Rabbi Isaac Elchanan Theological Seminary
- Gerald Blidstein, (1956), winner of the Israel Prize and former Ben-Gurion University of the Negev professor
- Herbert Bomzer, (1945), former Rabbi
- Michael Broyde, Emory University School of Law professor
- Ephraim Buchwald, (1963), founder and president, National Jewish Outreach Program
- Steven Burg (MTA, 1989) CEO Aish HaTorah
- Zevulun Charlop, (1947), Rabbi Isaac Elchanan Theological Seminary dean emeritus
- Samuel J. Danishefsky, chemist and professor, Columbia University and Memorial Sloan Kettering Cancer Center
- Avishai David, (1967), Rosh Yeshiva at Yeshivat Torat Shraga
- Alan Dershowitz, (BTA, 1955), lawyer, author, and Harvard Law School professor
- Yechiel Eckstein, (1968), founder and former president, International Fellowship of Christians and Jews
- Shimon Eider, (BTA class of 1956), former Rabbi
- Michael Eisenberg, 1989, American-Israeli businessman, venture capitalist, and author
- Yehoshua Fass, 1991, Founder of Nefesh B'Nefesh
- Hillel Furstenberg, (1951), Israeli mathematician and winner of the Israel Prize and Abel Prize
- Julius Genachowski, former chairman, Federal Communications Commission
- Menachem Genack, (1965), Orthodox Union Kosher chief executive officer
- Mordechai Gifter (1933), former Rosh Yeshiva of Telshe yeshiva in Cleveland
- Elon Gold, (MTA, Class of 1988), actor
- Irving Greenberg, (BTA class of 1949), scholar and author
- Jason Greenblatt, (MTA, Class of 1985), executive vice president and chief legal officer of The Trump Organization and former Assistant to the President and Special Representative for International Negotiations to President Donald Trump.
- Howard Jachter, Rabbi
- Richard Joel, (1968), former president, Yeshiva University
- Alan Kadish, president, Touro University System
- Meir Kahane, (BTA class of 1949), founder, Jewish Defense League, and former Israeli Knesset member.
- Joseph Kaminetsky, Rabbi and first director, Torah Umesorah
- Max Kampelman (1937), American diplomat, Presidential Medal of Freedom awardee
- Ephraim Kanarfogel, (1973), scholar of medieval Jewish history and rabbinic literature, and expert in Jewish law
- Stan Kasten, (1969), president, Los Angeles Dodgers, former president of the Atlanta Braves, Atlanta Hawks, Atlanta Thrashers, and Washington Nationals
- Yossi Klein Halevi, (BTA class of 1971), author and journalist
- Bernard Lander (1933), founder and first president, Touro College
- Ralph Lauren, American fashion designer and business executive (did not graduate from MTA but attended the school for two years)
- Yehuda (Leo) Levi, rabbi, physicist, writer and educator
- Nathan Lewin, (1953), lawyer and professor
- Bill Mazer (1936), radio and television personality
- Moses Mescheloff, (Class of 1926), Rabbi
- Avigdor Miller, Rabbi
- Macy Nulman, Cantor
- Velvel Pasternak (1951), authority on Jewish Music
- Chaim Potok, (1946), author
- Steven Pruzansky, Rabbi in New Jersey
- Emanuel Rackman, (class of 1927), Rabbi and president, Bar-Ilan University
- Aaron Rakeffet-Rothkoff, (1955), scholar, author, and teacher
- Shlomo Riskin, (BTA class of 1956), founder, Lincoln Square Synagogue and Chief Rabbi of Efrat
- Yair Rosenberg, (2006), journalist
- Itamar Rosensweig, Rabbi
- Fred Rosner (1951), Jewish Law and medicine expert
- Hershel Schachter, (1958), Rosh Yeshiva and Rabbinic authority
- Eli Rozenberg (2012), majority shareholder of El Al airline
- Jerome Schottenstein, businessman
- Mordechai Shapiro, singer and entertainer
- Ahron Soloveichik, Rosh Yeshiva
- Ben-Tzion Spitz, Chief Rabbi of Uruguay
- Mark Steiner, (1960), professor of philosophy
- Pinchas Stolper, Executive, Union of Orthodox Jewish Congregations of America and writer
- Daniel E. Straus (BTA), business executive
- Moshe Dovid Tendler, Rosh Yeshiva and authority on Jewish medical ethics
- Eli Turkel, (1961), Tel Aviv University mathematics professor
- Stanley M. Wagner, Rabbi
- Jeremy Wieder (1988), Rosh Yeshiva
- Mark Wildes, American rabbi and author (1985)
- Steven Winter (1970)
- Martin Yarmush, (BTA, class of 1970), Distinguished Professor of Biomedical Engineering, Rutgers University and Director, Center for Engineering in Medicine and Surgery. Massachusetts General Hospital and Harvard Medical School
- Yosef H. Yerushalmi, (1948), Jewish historian and Columbia University professor of Jewish history
- Dov S. Zakheim, (BTA class of 1966), former U.S. Under Secretary of Defense
- Zvi Zeitlin, (1939), classical violinist
- Sol Zim, 1957, Cantor
- Jonathan Zizmor, (1962), dermatologist
- Efraim Zuroff, (MTA, 1966), historian and Nazi hunter
