= Yaakov Neuburger =

American rabbi

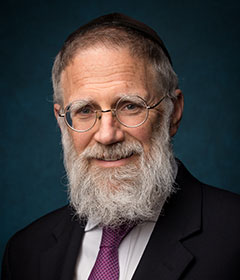
Rabbi Yaakov Neuburger

Rabbi Yaakov Neuburger (born July 1955) is a Rosh Yeshiva at Rabbi Isaac Elchanan Theological Seminary (RIETS), Yeshiva University, in New York City. There, he heads the Yeshiva Program and Mazer School of Talmudic Studies of Yeshiva University. Rabbi Neuberger is also the Synagogue Rabbi at Congregation Beth Abraham in Bergenfield, New Jersey, a position he has held since 1990. Prior to that, he led the Jewish community at the Albert Einstein College of Medicine and the Jack D. Weiler Hospital from 1986 to 1990.

== Education ==
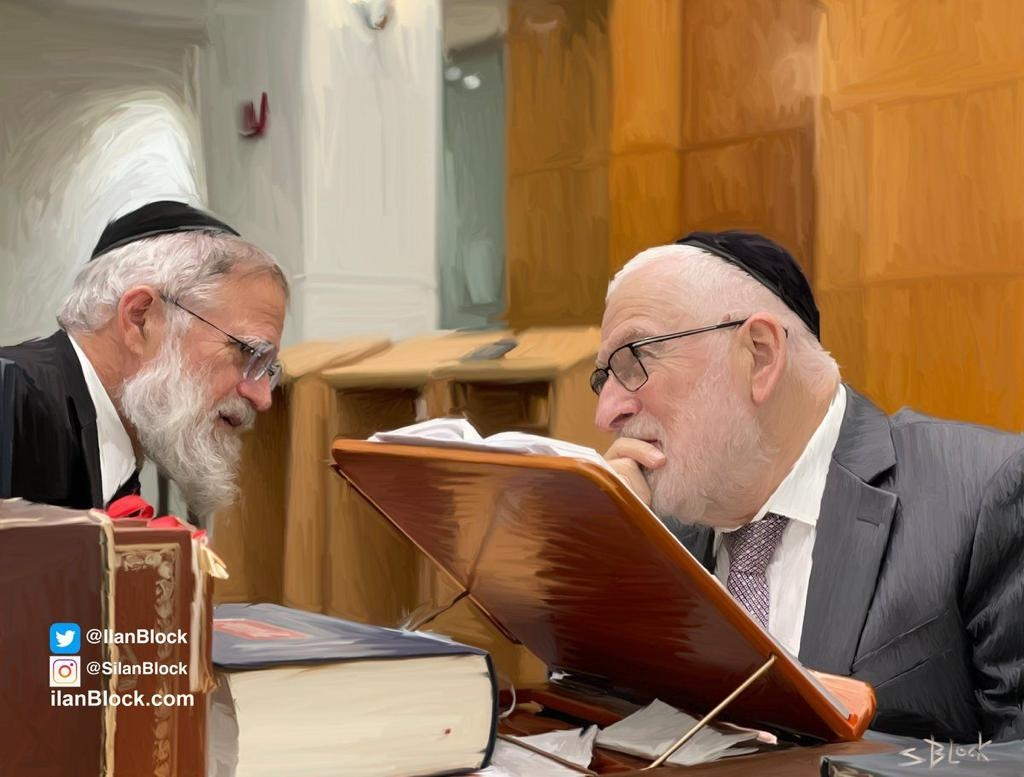
Rabbi Nueburger with Co-Rosh Yeshiva Rav Herschel Schachter

Rabbi Neuburger received semicha from Rabbi Isaac Elchanan Theological Seminary in 1979. He also holds a master's degree in psychology from Columbia University. He is a student of Rabbis Joseph Soloveitchik, Nisson Alpert, Dovid Lifshitz and Herschel Schachter. He did his Rabbinical Shimush with Rabbi Shalom Eisen of the Edah HaChareidis in Jerusalem on the recommendation of Rabbi Zevulun Charlop.

== Focus ==
Rabbi Neuburger is one of the most authoritative rabbis in Yeshiva University regarding issues related to marital relationships and the purity of the Jewish home. He offers his services to help young men train for married life, and prepare to build a proper Jewish home, built on Jewish law and spirit.

== Works ==
Rabbi Neuburger is also the author of "Ikvei Moshe". There are two volumes of Ikvei Moshe so far: on Keiztad Mevarchim (the sixth chapter of Tractate Berachot) and on Tractate Sanhedrin of the Talmud.

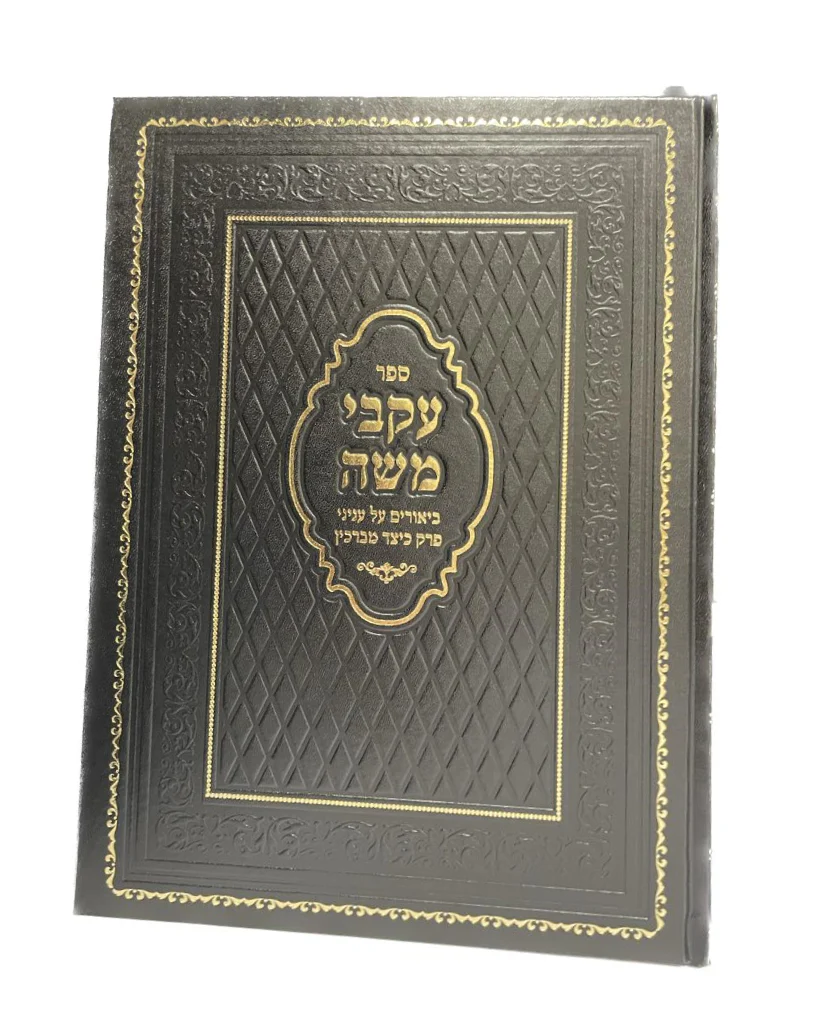
Ikvei Moshe on Perek Keitzad Mevorchim

== Personal life ==
Rabbi Neuburger's son Dovi is a New York City-based stand-up comedian.

== Online articles ==
- TorahWeb articles, audio, and video
