= Morris J. Besdin =

Jewish chaplain in the United States Army during World War II

Morris J. Besdin (July 15, 1913-April 10, 1982, also known as Moshe Besdin) was a Jewish chaplain in the United States Army during World War II, a pulpit rabbi in Pennsylvania and New York, a university Jewish studies educator and a university administrator. For nearly a quarter-century he headed the Jewish Studies Program (JSP) at Yeshiva University, created to appeal to ba’alei teshuva (religious returnees). They constituted “a revolution in Jewish religious life” and the movement was “a new phenomenon in Judaism; for the first time there are not only Jews who leave the fold ... but also substantial number who ‘return.’” The “excellent” JSP program was the “first Orthodox residential college (yeshiva) designed for newly or prospective Orthodox Jews” and the “most dramatically successful” of any in its time.

== Early years ==
Besdin was born in Pruzhany, Poland, son of Rabbi Eliezer Zvi Besdansky (1882-1937) and Ida (née Olizevsky) (1888-1955). On January 27, 1922, he arrived with his parents and two siblings at the Port of New York on board the SS Zeeland (1900). Abraham R. Besdin (1922-93), a brother who published works on Rabbi Joseph B. Soloveitchik, was born months after the family emigrated. In the United States, Besdin used the name “Moshe Besdansky” until 1936, when he applied to be the spiritual leader of Machzikeh Hadas in Scranton, Pennsylvania. For the rest of his life he was known as “Morris J. Besdin” or, using his Hebrew name, as “Moshe Besdin” (משה בית–דין).

Besdin was a standout student at New York schools. In 1924, he attended Yeshiva Rabbi Chaim, where he was among the top of his class, and in 1931 he graduated from the Talmudical Academy, the first high school in America to offer secular and religious subjects in a Jewish setting. In 1936, at the fifth annual commencement of Yeshiva College, he received a BA degree cum laude and rabbinic ordination (semikha) from Rabbi Isaac Elchanan Theological Seminary. His classmates judged him the “Most Respected” member of the Senior Class. At the Teachers Institute program at Yeshiva, from which he graduated, he was a student of Dr. Nathan Klotz, Professor of Bible.

In 1948, Besdin married Bertha Reichman (d. 2012), who had studied in Vienna, Antwerp, and New York City. The couple had four children.

== Pulpit career ==
In September 1936, Besdin succeeded Moses Mescheloff at Congregation Machzikai Hadas (also known as the Vine Street Synagogue), in Scranton, Pennsylvania, as rabbi and principal of the Hebrew school. There on occasion he delivered sermons in Yiddish and English.

In 1937, Besdin was appointed rabbi at Beth Hamedrash Hagodol Synagogue, West 175th Street, the oldest synagogue in Washington Heights (founded 1916). In 1938, he started the Yeshiva Rabbi Moses Soloveitchik in Manhattan, which was located on the synagogue premises. From its early years, it appealed to boys and girls who had minimal knowledge of Hebrew.

Besdin continued as chairman of the education committee at the Yeshiva, and at the synagogue itself, until 1950, when he became spiritual leader of Kew Gardens Adath Yeshurun Synagogue in Kew Gardens, Queens. The institution was “the first Orthodox synagogue established and built in New York shortly after the war.” It helped to meet the needs of the Jewish population of the Borough of Queens, which had increased from fewer than 25,000 in 1920 to 200,000 in 1950 and 250,000 in 1953. He remained there until 1958.

== Chaplaincy ==
Besdin’s pulpit career was interrupted in March 1944, when he was inducted into the United States Army as a Jewish chaplain. A shortage of available Jewish Army chaplains persisted throughout World War II, with Besdin being one of 68 Orthodox rabbis to serve in that position during that time.

In April 1944, Besdin was assigned to the U.S. Military training base at Camp Livingston, Louisiana. That Christmas, he urged Jewish soldiers in the “spirit of brotherhood and cooperation” to volunteer to take the assignments of Christian soldiers who wished to observe the holiday.

Besdin remained at Camp Livingston until June 1945, then moving to the U.S. Army installation at Fort Richardson, Anchorage, Alaska. That September he conducted Yom Kippur services there, to which local Jewish families were invited. Although Jews began arriving in Alaska in 1942 in increasing numbers with American troops, there were barely 100 Jews in the territory prior to that, with no organized community or religious life. Besdin continued to lead religious services in Alaska, including speaking on “What Palestine Means to the Jew”. He was discharged on June 19, 1946 with the rank of captain.

== Teaching and Administrative career ==
After completing his military service, Besdin returned to Beth HaMedrosh Hagodol as its spiritual leader and, in 1946, became a lecturer in Talmud at the Teachers Institute of Yeshiva University. In 1951, he was named Chairman, Board of Education, at Yeshiva Rabbi Dov Revel in Forest Hills, Queens. During these years he spoke at forums on educational challenges facing the yeshiva ketana, Jewish elementary schools for boys.

In March 1956, in keeping with his Orthodox expansionist outlook, Samuel Belkin, president of Yeshiva University, announced a new preparatory program. “Nothing could be more beneficial to the Jewish community of America,” he said, “than the process of taking young students with Jewish backgrounds that are almost nil and turning them into well educated, Orthodox Jews.” In September 1956, the program geared to students “who, prior to entering Yeshiva College, had no preparation in Jewish studies” was launched. Such students were known as ba’alei teshuva (Hebrew, “masters of return” to Judaism), and the new venture was called the Jewish Studies Program (JSP). Teaching Bible, Besdin was one of three original instructors.

JSP remained without an appointed head until 1958, when Besdin was selected by Belkin to serve as its first chairman. In developing the program, Besdin acknowledged Belkin for his “constant and active encouragement". Besdin’s leadership continued for nearly 25 years, with his planned retirement at the end of 1982 being cut short by his death that April.

== Assessment of the Jewish Studies Program/James Striar School ==
In the United States from the early 1940s there were Orthodox yeshivot which provided educational opportunities from the elementary to college levels for men (and to a lesser extent, women) with limited Jewish backgrounds. From the late 1960s onwards, there were additional ones in the United States and Israel. The Jewish Studies Program, launched in-between those times (and later known as the James Striar School), reflected “the modern Orthodox, ‘centrist,’ philosophy and lifestyle of Yeshiva University.” In their own way, these programs addressed the most common thread in the baal teshuva phenomenon, “a search for meaning and purpose, a realization ... that full immersion in American secular life does not answer the ultimate questions of meaning, that life is fuller and richer when people attach themselves to something larger than themselves.” The Jewish Studies Program was “a new paradigm in the way the Orthodox community engaged with the larger American Jewry.”

From the outset, there were concerns across Yeshiva University about the potential negative impact of the JSP program. Some feared that “the introduction of irreligious boys on campus will take away from the Yeshiva atmosphere;” others were concerned about the impact of the “unlettered”, thought JSP may be no more than a “Jewish Sports Program,” and wondered about a secularizing impulse. JSP students themselves expressed “disappointments” about the lack of mentorship by students in the two other Yeshiva divisions, RIETS and Teachers’ Institute. Doubts lingered for years as to whether “a return to Judaism” was underway, thus raising questions about the need for JSP.

Notwithstanding these concerns, it did not take long for the program to gain favor. JSP began with 19 students in October 1956 out of a total enrollment at Yeshiva College of 430. In 1958, when Besdin was named chairman of the program, the program had 33 students; in 1962, JSP students constituted the second-largest portion of the freshman class (26%); for the 1965-6 academic year, 286 students were enrolled.

Secular studies faculty at Yeshiva lauded the program, editors at the student newspaper called it an “overwhelming success,” and one student said it was “probably one of the most dynamic and interesting experiments ever undertaken in the field of modern religious education.” Less than a decade after being launched, JSP graduates were entering the RIETS semikha program. “Even the severest critics of Yeshiva University,” concluded one academic, “have acclaimed the remarkable success of this program and are inclined to concede that no other institution within Orthodoxy is equipped to do a comparable job.”

The success of the program was traceable to Besdin. He personally interviewed all JSP applicants to gauge their knowledge level, religious sincerity, and learning potential. He vowed that “All the noncommitted shall not be admitted,” and in the early years, over 50% were rejected. He taught Bible to all incoming freshmen and selected the JSP instructors and set performance requirements for them.

Besdin was prepared for the job. Well-educated himself, he had acquired first-hand knowledge of Jews lacking a Jewish background from his years as a chaplain and from his role at New York yeshivas. He was also praised as a pedagogue, referred to as a “master teacher” and a "marvelous educator." Yeshiva President Norman Lamm called him “the greatest of all our educators.”

Besdin attributed his skills to his father. As a pedagogue, he insisted on textual learning of traditional Jewish primary sources. His description of this “It-ology” approach – “[Teach] It, not about it” – was so memorable that students imprinted it on t-shirts. He mentored JSP instructor Shlomo Riskin, and other teachers copied his method.

== Teaching dictums ==
- "[Teach] It, not about it"
- “Gentlemen, the chumash is Bereshis. The sedrah is Bereshis. The perek is aleph. The pasuk is aleph.”
- “God gave us a corresponding finger on each hand – one [for] the Chumash, and one for Rashi.”
- “You must be totally dedicated to Torah and Torah ideals, otherwise you can’t go on here [at JSP]. We’ll part, but we’ll part friends. I’ll respect you, and you, I’m sure, will respect me, but you won’t be able to go on here.”
- The Jewish Studies Program is “a crash program to reverse the trend to willful assimilation.”

== Awards and recognition ==
- Bernard Revel Memorial Award in Religion and Religious Education (1962).
- Yeshiva College Graduating Class Senior Professor Award (1964).
- Moshe Besdin Memorial Fund (1982) providing scholarships for students from Russia, Iran, and elsewhere.
