= List of International Bible Contest Winners =

Winners of competition on the Jewish Bible

This is a list of the winners of the annual International Bible Contest (Hebrew: חידון התנ"ך).

== Youth winners ==
Winners of the International Bible Youth Contest
Serial	Gregorian Year	Hebrew Year	1st place	2nd place	3rd place	4th place	5th place
1	1963	תשכ"ג	Herzel Klij (הרצל קליג') (Israel) David Goldmintz (דוד גולדמינץ) (Canada) Reuven Goata (ראובן גואטה) (Israel) (Note: Originally Klij won first place and Goldmintz and Goata won second, but after an appeal, all were awarded 1st place.)	Isaac Boaz Gotleib (יצחק בועז גוטליב) (US)			
2	1965	תשכ"ה	Balfour Hakak (בלפור חקק) (Israel)	Herzel Hakak (הרצל חקק) (Israel) (Note: Herzel was the brother of Balfour, the 1st Place winner the same year.)	Esther Freilich (אסתר פרייליך) (US)		
3	1966	תשכ"ו	Eliyahu Mualam (אליהו מועלם) (Israel)	Russell Hendel (עזרא הנדל) (US)	Yosef Tovim (יוסף טובים) (Israel)		
4	1967	תשכ"ז	Isaac Chagiz (יצחק חגיז) (Israel)	Reuven Kaplan (ראובן קפלן) (US)	Emtzia Ben Artzi (אמציה בן ארצי) (Israel)		
5	1968	תשכ"ח	Avraham Malek (אברהם מלק) (US)	Shabtai Ashkenazi (שבתאי אשכנזי) (Israel)	Rivka Goldberg (רבקה גולדברג) (Israel)		
6	1969	תשכ"ט	Noam Zohar (נועם זוהר) (Israel)	Howard (Shmuel) Koenig (שמואל קעניג) (US)	Yaron Reich (ירון רייך) (US)		
7	1970	תש"ל	Shlomo Freidman (שלמה פרידמן) (Israel)	Dov Brinkar (דב בריקנר) (Israel)	Devora Lander (דבורה לנדר) (US)		
8	1971	תשל"א	Yisrael Wocoropolis (ישראל וכורופולוס) (Israel)	Efrat Rozenblatt (אפרת רוזנבליט) (Israel)	Chaviv Amar (חביב עמר) (Israel)		
9	1972	תשל"ב	Avner Mitzrafi (אבנר מצרפי) (Israel)	Ilana Biton (אילנה ביטון) (Israel)	David Barkfeld (דוד ברכפלד) (Belgium)		
10	1973	תשל"ג	Liora Reich (ליאורה רייך) (US)	David Leiman (דוד לימן) (US)	Rachel Matzliach (רחל מצליח) (US)		
11	1974	תשל"ד	Chaim Warner (חיים וורנר) (Canada)	Gilad Neumann (גלעד נוימן) (Israel)Yisrael Peles (ישראל פלס) (Israel)			
12	1975	תשל"ה	Efraim Korngot (אפרים קורנגוט) (Israel)	Yakov Haildeshaim (יעקב הילדסהיים) (Israel)	Heidi Weltzer (היידי ולצר) (SA) Shmuel Toldenu (שמואל טולדנו) (Israel)		
13	1976	תשל"ו	Yair Shfira (יאיר שפירא) (Israel)	Shimon Lapid (שמעון לפיד) (Israel)	Avraham Tenenbaum (אברהם טננבוים) (Israel)		
14	1977	תשל"ז	Chelkia Kavrah (חלקיה כברה) (Israel)	David Glatt (דוד גלאט) (US)	Tzvi Heiresh (צבי הירש) (BEL)		
15	1978	תשל"ח	Eli Srusi (אלי סרוסי) (Israel)	Elazar Tenenbaum (אלעזר טננבוים) (Israel)	Mordechai Biton (מרדכי ביטון) (Israel)		
16	1979	תשל"ט	Ronan Feldman (רונן פלדמן) (Israel)	Elazar Tenenbaum (אלעזר טננבוים) (Israel) Ariyeh Greenstine (אריה גרינשטיין) (ARG)	Menashe Wiener (מנשה וינר) (Israel)		
17	1980	תש"מ	Nariah Pinchas (נריה פנחס) (Israel)	David Moriah (דוד מוריה) (Israel)	Nachum Stepansky (נחום סטפנסקי) (Israel)		
18	1981	תשמ"א	Naftali Maklof (נפתלי מכלוף) (Israel)	Alon Mogilner (אלון מוגילנר) (US)	Asher Chafuta (אשר חפוטא) (Israel)		
19	1982	תשמ"ב	Tzion IIloz (ציון אילוז) (Israel)	Shimon Ashuel (שמעון אשואל) (Israel)	Binyamin Izraeli (בנימין יזרעאלי) (Israel)		
20	1983	תשמ"ג	Rafi Navon (רפי נבון) (Israel)	Shimon Ashuel (שמעון אשואל) (Israel) Lisa Szubin (עליזה זובין) (US)			
21	1984	תשמ"ד	Binny Mushkavitz (בני מושקוביץ) (Israel)	Hillel Novetsky (הלל נובצקי) (Israel)	Tzachi Asraf (צחי אסרף) (Israel)		
22	1985	תשמ"ה	Ahud Zecharia (אהד זכריה) (Israel)	Ruty Bar Meir (רותי בר מאיר) (Israel)	Elikim Knigsberg (אליקים קניגסברג) (Israel) Yakov Shetz (יעקב שץ) (ISR)		
23	1986	תשמ"ו	Yoav Shlosberg (יואב שלוסברג) (Israel)	Tzury Chiun (צורי חיון) (Israel) Yisrael Shelalashuely (ישראל שללאשוילי) (ISR)	Ariel Nissim (אריאל נסים) (Israel)		
24	1987	תשמ"ז	Yechezkel Shetz (יחזקאל שץ) (Israel)	Amnuel Mushkavitz (עמנואל מושקוביץ) (Israel)	Simcha Haber (שמחה הבר) (Israel)		
25	1988	תשמ"ח	Jeremy Wieder (ירמיהו וידר) (US) Zahava Chadad (זהבה חדד) (ISR)	Shai Alonei (שי אלוני) (Israel)	Oren Ketz (אורן כץ) (Israel)		
26	1989	תשמ"ט	Yaron Yanai (ירון ינאי) (Israel)	David Grover (דוד גרובר) (Israel)	Yovel Karmon (יובל כרמון) (Israel)		
27	1990	תש"ן	Shachar Chazan (שחר חזן) (Israel) Michal Wiengart (מיכל ויינגורט) (ISR)				
28	1991	תשנ"א	Adina Lover (עדינה לובר) (Israel)	Liat Zivi (ליאת זיוי) (Israel)	Meirav Herzberg (מירב הרצברג) (Israel)		
29	1992	תשנ"ב	Yonatan Shirabi (יונתן שרעבי) (Israel) Doron Sofer (דורון סופר) (ISR)	Eren Meir (ערן מאיר) (Israel)	Avi Bitton (אבי ביטון) (Israel)		
30	1993	תשנ"ג	Nir Kohen (ניר כהן) (Israel)	Asher Maimon (אשר מיימון) (Israel)	Shai Weissvort (שי וייסבורט) (Israel)		
31	1994	תשנ"ד	Tal Politis (טל פוליטיס) (Israel)	Ilan Giat (אילן גיאת) (Israel)	Pinchas Shetz (פנחס שץ) (Israel)		
32	1995	תשנ"ה	Moshe Mazoz (משה מזוז) (Israel)	Alida Even-Chaim (אלידע אבן-חיים) (Israel)	Yisrael Elitzur (ישראל אליצור) (Israel)		
33	1996	תשנ"ו	Doron Shachar (דורון שחר) (Israel)	Shlomi Ben Admon (שלומי בן-אדמון) (Israel)	Yonatan Keywell (יונתן קיוול) (Israel)		
34	1997	תשנ"ז	Aviv Portal (אביב פורטל) (ISR) Orit Brandt (אורית ברנד) (Israel)	Inat Zivi (עינת זיוי) (Israel)	Heidi Shirabi (הידי שרעבי) (Israel)		
35	1998	תשנ"ח	Shimon Muskat (שמעון מושקאט) (Israel)	Karmit Zlieger (כרמית זליגר) (Israel)	Chagai Ben Chaim (חגי בן-חיים) (Israel)		
36	1999	תשנ"ט	Orit Torem (אורית טורם) (Israel)	Tammy Kohen (תמי כהן) (Israel)	Leah Polchik (לאה פולצ'ק) (Israel)		
37	2000	תש"ס	Sarah Rachel Mahalo (שרה רחל מהלו) (ISR)	Shlomo Danziger (שלמה דנציגר) (ISR) Sivan Havida (סיון הוידה) (ISR)	Bracha Bininfeld (ברכה ביננפלד) (US)		
38	2001	תשס"א	Shai Chasan (שי חסן) (Israel)	Eliyav Danziger (אליאב דנציגר) (Canada)	Yael Kohelet (יעל קהלת) (Israel)		
39	2002	תשס"ב	Avichai Sheli (אביחי שלי) (Israel) Meir Ben Admon (מאיר בן-אדמון) (Israel)	Meir Ben Dror (מאיר בן-דרור) (Israel)	Yakov Frydman-Kohl (יעקב פרידמן-קול) (Canada)		
40	2003	תשס"ג	Moren Gomri (מורן גומרי) (Israel)	Nariah Klein (נריה קליין) (Israel)	Daniel Kirsh (דניאל קירש) (Israel)		
41	2004	תשס"ד	David Tzurael (דוד צוראל) (Israel)	Yoni Halpern (יוני הלפרן) (Canada)	Ora Mofik (אורה מואפיק) (Israel)		
42	2005	תשס"ה	David Shmuel Alpert (דוד שמואל אלפרט) (ISR)	Moshe Mali (משה מאלי) (ISR)	Shaul Fish (שאול פיש) (ISR)	Ben Kandel (חיים קנדל) (USA)	Sarah Shainhouse (שרה שיינהויז) (Canada)
43	2006	תשס"ו	Adi Diament (עדי דיאמנט) (ISR)	Isaac Barabi (יצחק ברבי) (ISR) Shira Rosengart (שירה רוזנגארט) (ISR)	Hillel Weintraub (הלל וויינטרויב) (USA)		
44	2007	תשס"ז	Yishai Gispan (ישי גיספאן) (ISR)	Tamar Kronman (תמר קרונמן) (ISR)	Tzuriel Shushan (צוריאל שושן) (ISR)		
45	2008	תשס"ח	Tzurit Barnson (צורית ברנסון) (ISR)	Elad Finish (אלעד פיניש) (ISR)	Dovi Nadel (דב מרדכי נדל) (US)		
46	2009	תשס"ט	Sapir Malka (ספיר מלכא) (ISR)	Ori Lovish (אורי לוביש) (ISR)	Aviv Bernbloom (אביב ברנבלום) (ISR)		
47	2010	תש"ע	Or Ashuel (אור אשואל) (Israel)	Elad Nachshon (אלעד נחשון) (Israel)	Avner Netanyahu (אבנר נתניהו) (Israel)		
48	2011	תשע"א	Shlomi Edelman (שלומי אדלמן) (Israel)	Noam Chadad (נעם חדד) (Israel)	Afir Avo (אופיר אבו) (Israel)		
49	2012	תשע"ב	Elchanan Block (אלחנן בלוך) (Israel)	Akiva Abramowitz (עקיבא אברמוביץ') (US)	Avshalom Adler (אבשלום אדלר) (Israel) Elias Jalife (אליהו חליפה) (Mexico)		
50	2013	תשע"ג	Elior Bevian (אליאור בביאן) (Israel) Yishai Eisenberg (ישי אייזנברג) (US)	Liora Braverman (ליאורה ברוורמן) (Israel)	Koren Kazas (קורן קאזס) (Israel) Shalhevet Shwartz (שלהבת שוורץ) (US)		
51	2014	תשע"ד	Eitan Amos (איתן עמוס) (Canada)	Tefila Barnson (תפילה ברנסון) (Israel)	Itamar Kalifa (איתמר קאליפא) (Israel)		
52	2015	תשע"ה	Ayil Matas (אייל מטס) (Israel)	Yisrael Elgrabli (ישראל אלגרבלי) (Israel)	Ered Kotzer (ארד קוצר) (Israel)	Ryan Rafael Ripsman (רייאן רפאל ריפסמן) (CAN)	Yehonatan Haimovici (יהונתן חיימוביץ) (CAN)
53	2016	תשע"ו	Elkana Friedman (אלקנה פרידמן) (Israel)	Tehila Matas (תהילה מטס) (Israel)	Tzuriel Ne'eman (צוריאל נעמן) (Israel)	Gidon Fox (גידעון פוקס) (SA)	
54	2017	תשע"ז	Sagiv Lugasi (שגיב לוגסי) (Israel)	Naomi Cohen (נעמי כהן) (Israel)	Maria Shpilowitz (מאשה שפילביץ) (Belarus)	Shlomo Helfgot (שלומי הלפגוט) (US)	
55	2018	תשע"ח	Azriel Shalit (עזריאל שילת) (Israel)	Oriah Cohen (אוריה כהן) (Israel)	Ofek Avraham (אופק אברהם) (Israel)		
56	2019	תשע"ט	Yonatan Weissman (יונתן ויסמן) (Israel)	Binyamin Colchamiro (בנימין כלחמירו) (US)	Yarin Bar (ירין בר) (Israel)	Adar Geller (אדר גלר) (Israel)	
57	2020	תש"ף	Ruth Cohen (רות כהן) (Israel)	Moshe Gildai (משה גלידאי) (Israel)	Nossi Shields (חיים נתן שילדס) (US)	Miriam Cherem (מרים חרם) (MEX)	
58	2021	תשפ"א	Gilad Abrahamoff (גלעד אברהמוף) (Israel)	Dvir Barchad (דביר ברח"ד) (Israel)	Benjamin Romm (בנימין רם) (US)	Amit Elgazar (עמית אלגזר) (ISR)	
59	2022	תשפ"ב	Hillel Cohen (הלל כהן) (Israel) Dvir Chaim Martzevek (דביר חיים מרצבך) (Israel)	Yitzchak Spivak (יצחק ספיוואק) (US)	Yaacov Weinstein (יעקב ויינשטיין) (SA)	Benjamin Wald (בנימין וולד) (Canada)	
60	2023	תשפ"ג	Emunah Cohen (אמונה כהן) (Israel)	Netta Laks (נטע לקס) (Israel)	Omer Kedar (עומר קדר) (Israel)	Tamar Dahan (תמר דהן) (US)	
61	2024	תשפ״ד	Evyatar Bargil (אביתר ברגיל) (Israel) David Shasha (דוד שאשא) (Israel)	Dov Gothelf (דוב גאטהעלף) (USA)	Noa Cahn (נועה כאהן) (Israel)	Penina Crystal (פנינה קריסטל) (US)	Yahav Noah Atlas (יהב נח אטלס) (Israel)
62	2025	תשפ"ה	Elad Yanir (אלעד יניר) (ISR)	Ilan Romm (אילן רם) (USA)	Yehudah Meir Goren (יהודה מאיר גורן) (ISR)	Adir Blatner (אדיר בלטנר) (ISR)	Shirah Cahn (שירה כאהן) (ISR)
63	2026	תשפ"ו	Hodaya Cohen (הודיה כהן) (ISR)	Akiva (Jackson) Shrier (עקיבא שרייר) (USA)	Joshua Appelbaum (tied for 2nd, lost tiebreaker) (USA)	Hadassah Esther Ritch (הדסה ריץ') (USA)	

== Adult winners ==
Winners of the International Bible Adult Contest
Gregorian Year	Hebrew Year	1st place	2nd place	3rd place	4th place
1959		Amos Chacham (עמוס חכם) (ISR)			
2012	תשע״ג	Refael Meyuchas (ISR)	Ezra Frazer (US)	Leonard Warner (CAN)	Daniel Cohen (FRA)
2014	תשע״ד	Hananel Malka (ISR)	Alexander Heppenheimer (US)	Ariel Cohen-Imach (ARG)	Daniel Cohen (FRA)
2016	תשע״ז	Yafit Slimon (יפית סלימון) (ISR) Yair Shahak (יאיר שחק) (US)	Eliezer Avergil (אליעזר אברג'ל) (FRA)	Mordechai Zvi (מרדכי צבי) (CAN)	
2019	התש"ף	Yedidyah Meyuchas (ידידיה מיוחס) (ISR)	Binyamin Rosensweig (בנימין רוזנצוויג) (ISR)	Shneyor Borton (שניאור בורטון) (US)	
2021	תשפ"א				
2024	התשפ"ה	Shimson Jacob (שמשון ג'יקוב) (ISR)	Shlomo Mundshein (שלמה מונדשיין) (ISR)	Barry Saffern (ברי ספרן) (US)	Nathan Dweck (נתן דוויק) (US)

== Diaspora winners ==
Winners of the International Bible Diaspora Contest
Gregorian Year	Hebrew Year	1st place	2nd place	3rd place	4th place
2007	תשס״ז	Yakir Forman (יקיר פורמן) (USA)			
2008	תשס״ח	Rivka Witty (CAN)			
2009	תשס״ט	Darren Sultan (USA)			
2010	תש"ע	Becky Friedman (CAN)			
2011	תשע״א	Orly Loker (MEX)			
2012	תשע״ב	Aaron Goldberg (CAN) Akiva Abramowitz (עקיבא אברמוביץ') (USA)			
2013	תשע״ג	Yishai Eisenberg (USA)			
2014	תשע"ד	Eitan Amos (CAN)			
2015	תשע״ה	Tere Dabbah (MEX)			
2016	תשע"ו	Jacob Miller (USA)			
2017	תשע״ז	Aviel Abrams (SA)	Gabriel Mamane (CAN)		
2018	תשע״ח	Judah Levy (CAN)	Sintayhu Shefraw (ETH)		
2019	תשע״ט	Adela Maloul (PAN)	Ori Epstein (CAN)	Rafael Hakim (BRA)	
2020	תש"ף	Michael Hubner (BRA) Habtamu Tigo (ETH)	Yoav Gudes (CAN)	Reuven Garber (UK)	Mordejai Cohen (PAN)
2021	תשפ"א	Temima Goldfein (SA)	Shuli Goldberg (ARG)	Josef Korich (BRA)	Alegría Aboud (PAN) Frida Arakindji (MEX)
2022	תשפ"ב	Yoni Moss (AUS) Liela Silbiger (CAN)		Alberto Khafif (PAN) Yonathan Vandor (BRA)	Deby Melamed (ARG)
2023	תשפ"ג	Elizabeth Ceheebar (ARG)	Abraham Serfaty (PAN)	Julia Zaira (BRA)	Ella Mandelberg (SA)
2024	תשפ"ד	Ariela Sauer (MEX)	Abril Yael Cortez (ARG)	Yosef Formigoni (BRA)	Tzipora Klein (SA)
2025	תשפ"ה	Michal Rowe (UK)	Brahe Belaiche (FRA)	Yisrael Krawchik (MEX)	Hannah Calderon (CAN)
2026	תשפ"ו	Rivka Ilanit Saadia (רבקה אילנית סעדיה) (USA)	Harry Kerzhner (GER)	Benjamin Corch (BRA)	Yishai Fraser (UK)
