= Shalom Rosner =

Israeli Modern Orthodox rabbi

Rabbi Shalom Rosner
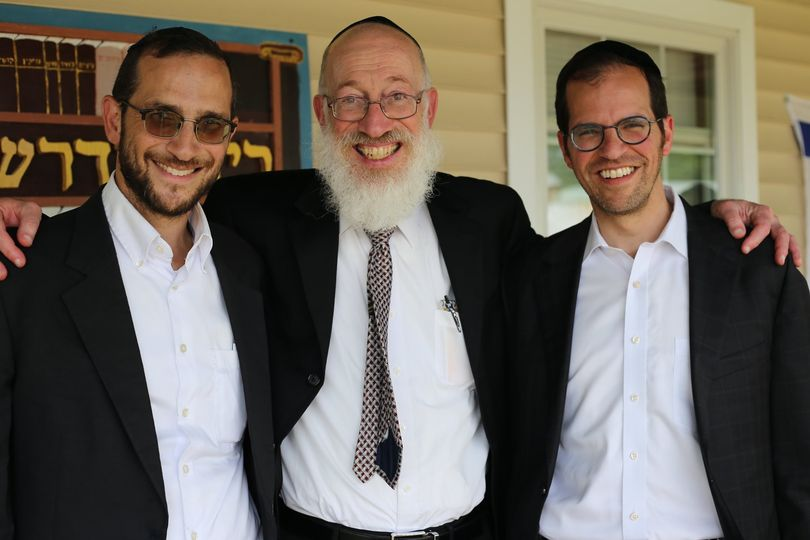
- Rabbi Shalom Rosner (left) with Rabbis Mordechai Willig (center) and Aryeh Lebowitz (right) at Camp Kaylie

Personal life
- Education: Yeshivat Sha'alvim, Yeshiva University

Religious life
- Religion: Judaism
- Denomination: Orthodox Judaism
- Synagogue: Kehillat Nofei HaShemesh
- Position: Founding Rabbi
- Semikhah: Rabbi Isaac Elchanan Theological Seminary

Rabbi Shalom Rosner is an Israeli Orthodox rabbi, author and educator, known for his widely followed Torah lectures and his leadership in English-language Torah education in Israel. In 2024, he was appointed Rosh Beit Midrash of the English-speaking program at the Jerusalem College of Technology.

== Biography ==
Rosner was raised in New York. He is the son of Fred Rosner, a medical ethicist and physician. Following high school, Rosner spent two years at Yeshivat Shaalvim in Israel. Rosner then studied at Yeshiva University, where he earned a degree in economics and a Master’s degree in Jewish Education and Administration from the Azrieli Graduate School. He received rabbinic ordination (semicha) from the Rabbi Isaac Elchanan Theological Seminary and was a member of the Beren Kollel Elyon as well as a Kupietsky Kodshim Fellow.

Until he moved to Israel in 2008, was a maggid shiur (lecture) at Yeshiva University’s Stone Beit Midrash Program and as rabbi of Congregation Bais Ephraim Yitzchok (“the Island Shul”) in Woodmere, New York, for approximately six years.

After moving to Israel, Rosner taught for at Yeshivat Reishit Yerushalayim and later was a senior lecturer at Yeshivat Kerem B'Yavneh.

He is also a founder and leader of the Nofei Hashemesh community in Beit Shemesh.

In 2024 Rosner was appointed head of English-language Judaic studies at Jerusalem College of Technology (Machon Lev campus). In this role, he leads the English-speaking Beit Midrash program, aiming to create a high-level Torah learning environment parallel to Hebrew-language programs while integrating academic study.

== Published Works ==
Rosner has authored several volumes focusing on Jewish law and the weekly Torah portion, published by Koren Publishers and OU Press:

- Shalom Rav (Volumes I & II) – Insights into the weekly Torah portion.
- The Shalom Rav Haggada (2023) – Commentary on the Passover Haggadah.
- Shalom Rav Birkon (2025) – A comprehensive Hebrew-English bencher with original commentary.

== Personal life ==
Rabbi Rosner is married to Dr. Tamar Rosner, a pediatrician, and they have seven children.
