= James Striar School of General Jewish Studies =

University center in New York City

Coordinates: 40.85124°N 73.93149°W

YU James Striar School of General Jewish Studies
- Type: Private
- Established: 1956
- Location: New York City, New York, USA
- Dean: Rabbi Jonathan Shippel
- Website: Official website

The James Striar School of General Jewish Studies, informally known as the Mechinah Program, is a comprehensive program in Jewish studies for male students seeking to improve and further their basic skills and knowledge of Jewish studies. JSS is the only school in the country designed for male college-age students who wish to pursue Jewish studies on either beginning or intermediate level while taking a regular college program simultaneously on the same campus. The program teaches the fundamentals of Jewish scholarship and heritage through a unique curriculum which consists of courses in Hebrew language, Bible, Jewish History, Talmud, and Jewish Philosophy, Laws and Customs.

The aim in all text-based courses is to train the student in progressive mastery of the text and to prepare him for independent study of original sources. The pervasive emphasis in the JSS approach to the study of Judaism has always been focused on learning it rather than learning about it. Graduates of the James Striar School are awarded an Associate Arts (AA) degree with a major in Hebrew Language, Literature, and Culture.

== History ==
In 1956, Yeshiva University created a program for male students who lacked sufficient background in Jewish studies. Dr. Samuel Belkin, then president of Yeshiva for over a decade, was convinced that there was an educational gap within the American Jewish community and he sought to develop an intensive program of Jewish education on the college level for students with limited Jewish backgrounds. The program was available to those who wanted a secular education combined with a program in general Jewish Studies. Despite some opposition Belkin resisted this opposition and proceeded to establish the Jewish Studies Program (JSP), as it was initially called.

Rabbi Moshe Besdin was charged with responsibility for establishing the curriculum and administering the program. R. Besdin taught Bible and emphasized learning the "Torah itself" from the text, as opposed to learning "about Torah." To illustrate this orientation he constantly used the phrase, "it and not about it." In his view, a working knowledge of the traditional sources and their exegesis by the classical Jewish commentators were essential for personal religious development.

In 1965, the school was renamed as to honor the benefaction of the Striar family in memory of their father, James Striar.

Staff

- Rabbi Yonason Shippel, Director
- Chad Hopkovitz, MPA, Assistant Director
- Rabbi Beny Rofeh, MSW, Guidance Counselor

Faculty

- Professor Harvey (Haim) Sober, professor of Hebrew Language and Ancient Near East History & Culture; founder of the Tora Dojo martial arts association.
- Rabbi Benjamin Yudin, speaker, writer, and contributor to Nachum Segal's JM in the AM Radio Show
- Rabbi Benjamin Blech, distinguished professor and prolific author of books on Jewish topics
- Rabbi Mordechai Becher, renowned lecturer and Gateways (organization) personality
- Rabbi Zev Reichman, noted author of works on Hasidic Philosophy
- Rabbi Dr. Daniel Lerner
- Rabbi Yitz Liberman
- Professor Leonard Moskowitz, noted authority on Jewish Meditation
- Rabbi Netanel Wiederblank
- Rabbi Simcha Willig

== Sephardic Track ==
Catering to the growing number of Sephardic Students (of Middle Eastern Descent) in the school, a Sephardic Track was launched in the Spring of 2007. Its intended goal is to provide a forum for students to be educated of their cultural differences and history at a traditionally Lithuanian oriented university. Current faculty of the Sephardic Track include:

- Rabbi Avidan Elkin
- Rabbi Moshe Tessone, Director of Sephardic Community Programming at Yeshiva University
- Professor Daniel Tsadik, an expert in Iranian Jewry
