= Shlomo Polachek =

Rabbi Shlomo Polachek
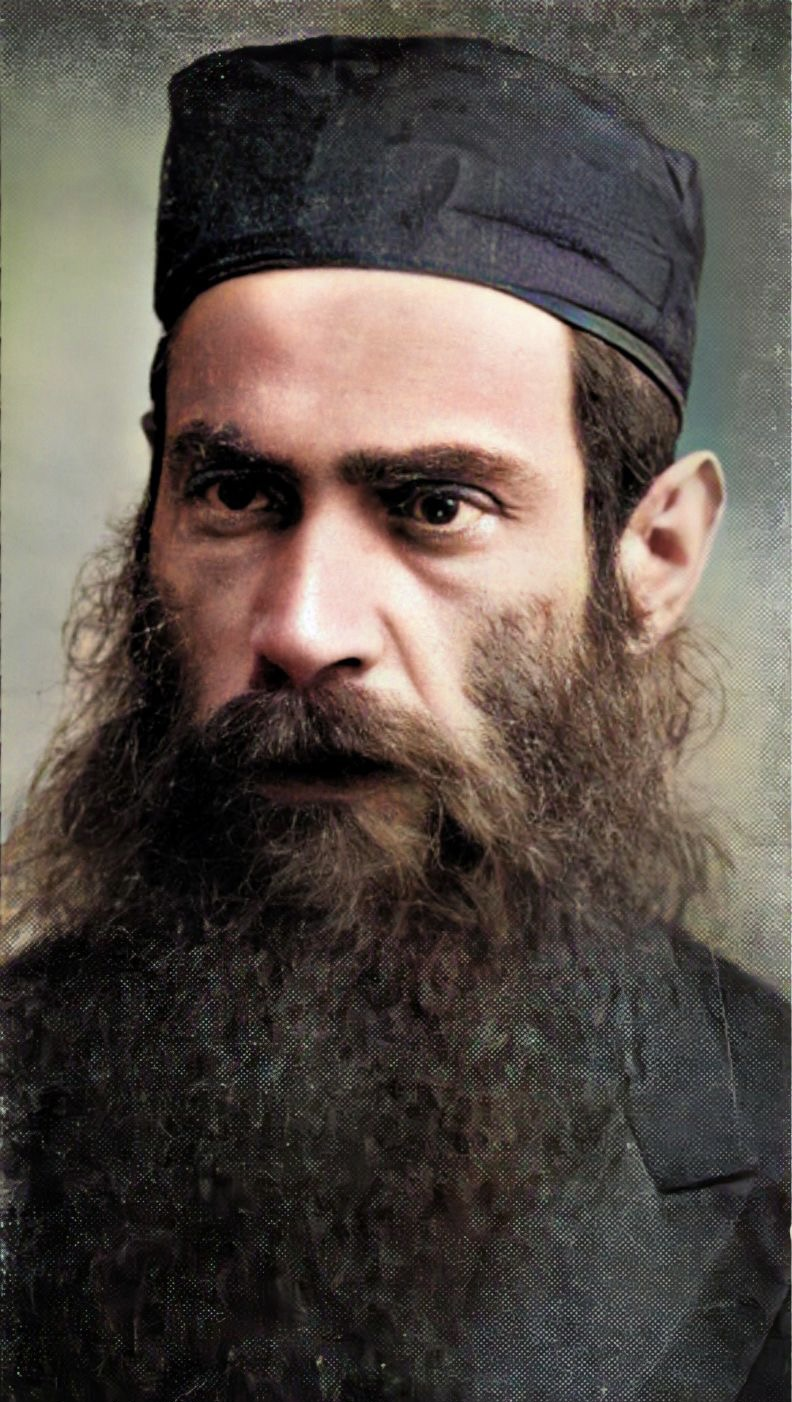
- The Meitscheter Illui

Rosh yeshiva at RIETS

Personal life
- Born: 1877 Sinichinitz, near Meitchet, Grodno
- Died: July 9, 1928 (aged 50–51)
- Known for: Rosh yeshiva at RIETS, Yeshiva University
- Occupation: Talmudic scholar, Rosh yeshiva

Religious life
- Religion: Judaism
- Denomination: Orthodox

Jewish leader
- Students: Menachem Perr, Nosson Meir Wachtfogel, Chaim Pinchas Scheinberg, Isaac Tendler, Zalman Levine, Mordechai Stern, Nisan Waxman

Shlomo Polachek (Hebrew: שלמה פוליצ'ק; 1877 – July 9, 1928) known as "the Meitscheter Illui" was born in Sinichinitz, near Meitchet, Grodna. He was an important Talmudic scholar and one of the earliest roshei yeshiva in America.

== Biography ==
He entered the Volozhin yeshiva when he was only twelve years old, and remained there until its close in the winter of 1892. He then went to learn with his mentor, Rabbi Chaim Soloveitchik, in Brisk for the next four years. Rabbi Elchonon Wasserman attested that he personally heard from Rabbi Chaim Soloveitchik, regarding Polachek in 1896, “Aza meshunediger illui vi der Meitsheter hob ich in leben nit gezen — I’ve never met a genius like the Meitscheter in my entire life.”

Polachek went on to become the rosh yeshiva in yeshivos in Lida and Białystok. At the invitation of Rabbi Dr. Dov Revel, Polachek arrived in America in 1922 to become a rosh yeshiva at the Rabbi Isaac Elchanan Theological Seminary (RIETS) the rabbinical school of Yeshiva University and its Yeshiva College, America's first yeshiva. He taught at RIETS for six years until his sudden passing in 1928.

== Views ==
Polachek held some broad-minded views relative to some of his contemporaries. For example, Jeffrey S. Gurock writes in Judaism's Encounter with American Sports (Indiana University Press):

...Polachek was silent on the importance of gyms and teams within the school [Yeshiva University]. But reportedly he did harbor a positive view of yeshivas encouraging students physical fitness. It was a Maimonidean-style point of view that [Bernard] Revel could have counted upon if he were ever challenged about what was going on in his Torah school...

— Jeffrey S. Gurock (2005). Judaism's Encounter with American Sports. Indiana University Press. ISBN 0-253-34700-9.

Following the sudden passing of Polachek in 1928, more than 15,000 people at gathered at his funeral outside the Yeshiva on the Lower East Side. Among those who eulogized him were Rabbi Boruch Ber Lebowitz.

Rabbi Shimon Shkop was persuaded to replace him for a short period of time.

== Family ==
His children were notable in their own right, including daughter Rebbetzin Libby Mowshowitz (married to Rabbi Dr. Israel Mowshowitz), a son who received a PhD, and another son who became a doctor .

== Prominent Students ==
Some of Polachek's prominent students included:

- Rabbi Menachem Perr
- Rabbi Nosson Meir Wachtfogel
- Rabbi Chaim Pinchas Scheinberg
- Rabbi Isaac Tendler
- Rabbi Zalman Levine
- Rabbi Mordechai Stern
- Rabbi Nisan Waxman

== Observance of his Yahrtzeit ==
Each year on the 21st of Tammuz, there is a pilgrimage to his grave at the Mount Judah Cemetery in Ridgewood, Queens.

== See also ==
- Brisk yeshivas and methods
- Yitzchak Elchanan Spektor (Rabbi Isaac Elchanan Spector, for whom RIETS is named)
