= Aryeh Lebowitz =

American Modern Orthodox rabbi

Rabbi Aryeh Lebowitz
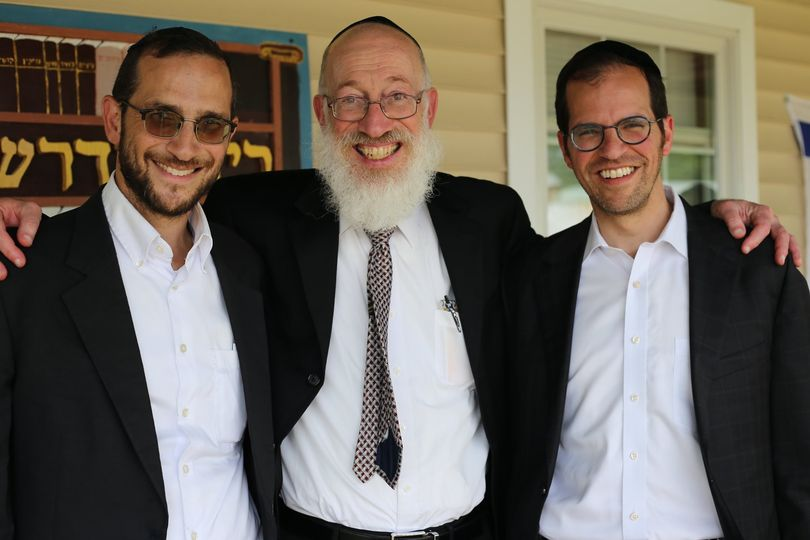
- Rabbi Aryeh Lebowitz (right) with Rabbis Mordechai Willig (center) and Shalom Rosner (left) at Camp Kaylie

Personal life
- Born: May 17, 1977 (age 49)
- Children: 5
- Education: Yeshivat Kerem B'Yavneh, Yeshiva University

Religious life
- Religion: Judaism
- Denomination: Orthodox Judaism
- Synagogue: Beis Kenesses of North Woodmere
- Yeshiva: Rabbi Isaac Elchanan Theological Seminary
- Position: Founding Rabbi
- Residence: North Woodmere, NY
- Semikhah: Rabbi Isaac Elchanan Theological Seminary

Aryeh Lebowitz (Hebrew: אריה צבי ליבוביץ, born May 17, 1977; 29th of Iyar 5737 on the Hebrew calendar) is an American Orthodox rabbi, author and posek. He is the director of the Rabbi Joseph B. Soloveitchik Semikhah Program at the Rabbi Isaac Elchanan Theological Seminary of Yeshiva University and the founding rabbi and current Mara D'atra of Beis Haknesses of North Woodmere.

== Biography ==
Lebowitz grew up in the Five Towns. Growing up, he originally wanted to be a lawyer. He attended Yeshivat Kerem B'Yavneh for two years after high school. There he developed a close relationship with Rav Ahron Silver, who encouraged him to pursue a career as a rabbi. He then studied at Yeshiva University, where he attended the Sy Syms School of Business and majored in finance. He is a close student of Rav Hershel Schachter. Rabbi Lebowitz received semikhah from RIETS and from Rabbi Zalman Nechemia Goldberg.

Rabbi Lebowitz served for three years as assistant rabbi at Congregation Shaaray Tefila in Lawrence, before establishing the Beis Haknesses of North Woodmere in 2004 where he presently serves as rabbi. Rabbi Lebowitz was previously a maggid shiur at Davis Renov Stahler Yeshiva High School for eighteen years until 2016, when he was hired as a senior maggid shiur at Lander College for Men.

Rabbi Lebowitz began as the Director of Semikhah at Yeshiva University in fall 2019. In August 2024, he was appointed the Abraham Arbesfeld Torah Dean of RIETS. During the summer Rabbi Lebowitz teaches at Camp Kaylie.

Rabbi Lebowitz has published numerous articles and several books on the practical applications of Jewish law, including authoring three volumes of Hakoneh Olamo, collections of halachic essays in Hebrew. He is popular on YUTorah for his “Ten Minute Halacha” lecture series, as well as his Daf Yomi series. Rabbi Lebowitz has published over 14,000 shiurim and articles on YUTorah, the most of anyone on the site. Rabbi Lebowitz is often invited to speak as a scholar in residence.

== Personal life ==
Lebowitz lives in North Woodmere and has 5 children.

== Notable students ==
- Dovid Bashevkin (DRS)
- Elliot Schrier (DRS)
- Dr. David Pfeffer (DRS)
