= Ezra Schwartz =

American Orthodox rabbi

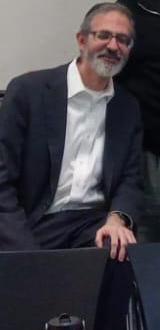
Rav Schwartz

Ezra Schwartz is a Rosh yeshiva and bochein (Official Examiner for Shiur placement exams at RIETS/YU) at Rabbi Isaac Elchanan Theological Seminary, an affiliate of Yeshiva University in New York City. In that role, he administers tests to incoming students and assigns students to classes. Schwartz is the fifth bochein in the history of RIETS. He succeeds Rabbi Yehuda Weil, Rabbi Mendel Zaks (the son in law of the Chofetz Chaim), Rabbi Shraga Feivel Paretzky, and Rabbi Eli B. Shulman.

He now teaches in the RIETS semikha program. He used to be an instructor of Talmud at the Mazer Yeshiva Program at Yeshiva University. Prior to 2012, he instructed Talmud at the Irving I. Stone Beit Midrash Program. He also coordinated the Rosansky Program in Contemporary Halacha. He also coordinates the Bronka Weintraub High School Bekiut Program, for high school students to study Talmud.

Rabbi Schwartz is unusual among RIETS Roshei Yeshiva because he also teaches in GPATS, YU's advanced program for teaching women. He has been teaching halacha to Shana Gimmel GPATS students since the shana gimmel program began. https://www.yu.edu/gpats/about/faculty-staff

He was a member of the staff of YU President Richard M. Joel, where he served as Assistant to the President for Research and Communications.

From September 2009 until August 2019, Rabbi Schwartz was the Senior Rabbi at the Modern Orthodox synagogue Mount Sinai Jewish Center of Washington Heights.
