= Shraga Feivel Paretzky =

Shraga Feivel Paretzky (1917–1992) (he: שרגא פייבל פארעצקי), also known as Rabbi Philip Paretzky, was a Rosh Yeshiva and Dean of Admissions at Rabbi Isaac Elchanan Theological Seminary in Manhattan, New York, a school of Yeshiva University.

Rabbi Paretzky was born in Razanka, in the Lida District, in what is now Belarus, but was then Poland, in 1917. From the age of ten, he studied at the Yeshiva in Białystok and then advanced to the Yeshiva in Kobrin. There he developed a close relationship with Rabbi Shlomo Mattis, a principal student of Rabbi Shimon Shkop. While still of a relatively young age, Rabbi Paretzky went to learn in Raduń Yeshiva, where he became a very close student of its Rosh Yeshiva, Rabbi Mendel Zaks, son-in-law of the Chofetz Chaim. Before emigrating from Europe, Rabbi Paretzky briefly studied at the Novardok yeshiva of Bialystk, and was granted Semiha - ordination - by the noted Rabbi Shimon Shkop.

In 1938, Rabbi Paretzky came to America and continued his Talmudic studies in RIETS, where he studied with and grew close to its Rosh Yeshiva, Rabbi Moshe Soloveitchik. He was appointed Rabbi of Young Israel Synagogue of Tremont in the Bronx, a position which he held for more than a quarter century. There he sought to reconcile the practices of his contemporary generation with the values of Torah and Judaism. Rabbi Paretzky is reputed to have been easily accessible to younger students, for despite a generation gap, he appealed to them. He urged his college students not to skip their daily Talmudic studies during Final examinations. He was a member of the Rabbinical Council of America and the Union of Orthodox Rabbis.

Rabbi Paretzky earned a master's degree in Semitics from Columbia University, where his advisor was the well-known historian Professor Salo Baron. His Master's Essay was about legal aspects of the Va'ad Arba Aratzot, the Council of Four Lands in Poland. He earned a J.D. degree from Fordham University Law School.

In 1964, Rabbi Paretzky returned to the RIETS to serve as a Rosh Yeshiva and Assistant Dean of Admissions to the Dean Rabbi Mendel Zaks. Rabbi Paretzky assumed the deanship upon the latter's death in 1974. Rabbi Paretzky is considered on par with other Rosh Yeshivas of RIETS including Rabbis Dovid Lifshitz and J. B. Soloveitchik.

Rabbi Feivel Paretzky died suddenly in 1992, according to Sam Hartstein, a spokesman for YU.

His wife, Mrs. Yehudit Paretzky, died on March 19, 2017. They are survived by their children, Dr. Paulette (Peshie) Mandelbaum, Rabbi Kopel "Kenneth" Paretzky of Monsey (husband of Rebbetzin Malka Paretzky, principal of the esteemed Bais Yaakov of Spring Valley), Rabbi Yisroel Paretzky of Passaic, NJ (a posek for the OU), and author Rabbi Zev T. Paretzky of Brooklyn, NY.

== Works ==
- Ner L'Maor (ספר נר למאור), edited by Zev T. Paretzky, Google BooksYU Library
- Rabbi Paretzky's thoughts on Talmudic topics have been published in many Judaic Periodicals (see and )
- Rabbi Paretzky also left many unpublished writings .
