= Philip and Sarah Belz School of Jewish Music =

Jewish Musical School in New York, United States

Coordinates: 40°51′4.36″N 73°55′53.02″W

The Philip and Sarah Belz School of Jewish Music is a music school that focuses on Jewish music. It is part of Yeshiva University and its Rabbi Isaac Elchanan Theological Seminary in New York City. Classes are held in the Schottenstein Center on Yeshiva University's Wilf Campus in Manhattan. Courses include nusaḥ hatefilah (prayer chanting), cantillation (Biblical chanting), voice, piano, music theory, history of Jewish music and liturgy, safrut (Hebrew calligraphy), and Sephardic ḥazzanut (cantorial music).

Cantor Bernard Beer currently serves as the director of the school. Prior to him, Cantor Macy Nulman served as director.

== Faculty ==
- Cantor Gabriel Abraham Shrem (late 1970s)
- Cantor Moshe Tessone
- Cantor Joseph Malovany
- Cantor Sherwood Goffin

== See also ==
- Religious Jewish music
