= Zvi Sobolofsky =

American rosh yeshiva

Rabbi Zvi Sobolofsky

Personal life
- Education: Yeshiva University

Religious life
- Religion: Judaism
- Denomination: Orthodox
- Synagogue: Ohr Hatorah, Bergenfield, New Jersey
- Yeshiva: RIETS
- Semikhah: RIETS

Zvi Sobolofsky is an American rabbi who is a rosh yeshiva at Yeshiva University in New York City.

Sobolofsky studied at Yeshivat Kerem B'Yavneh and Yeshiva University; graduating in 1987, he was named valedictorian of the Mazer Yeshiva Program. He then attended the Rabbi Isaac Elchanan Theological Seminary (RIETS), finishing in 1990 and graduated from the Azrieli Graduate School of Jewish Education and Administration in 1996.

He was appointed Rosh Yeshiva in the spring of 2002 and began teaching Talmud at Yeshiva University and its affiliated RIETS in the fall of that year. His shiur has gained much popularity in its short existence, and is currently one of the most popular shiurim in the Yeshiva. Some credit this popularity to his ability to blend the teaching styles of his two teachers, Mordechai Willig and Hershel Schachter. Willig is known for his focus towards practical understanding and Schachter is known for his ability to present topics in the Talmud in a broader context. Sobolofsky blends these two styles to form a unique package that many students find most rewarding. In addition to his role as Rosh Yeshiva in RIETS, Sobolofsky also serves as the spiritual leader of Congregation Ohr HaTorah in Bergenfield, New Jersey, where he is a resident. His synagogue has attracted many Orthodox Jews to the community. Sobolofsky also lectures at the Bergen County Beis Medrash Program (BCBM) housed at Congregation Bnai Yeshurun in Teaneck, New Jersey.

Prior to his appointment as Rosh Yeshiva, Sobolofsky was a fellow of the Gruss Kollel Elyon and then went on to teach in Yeshiva University's Stone Beis Medrash Program (SBMP) for seven years.

During the summer months, Sobolofsky served as Rosh Kollel for the Beis Medrash Program at Camp Morasha. In the summer 2008, he joined Roshei Yeshiva Hershel Schachter and Mayer Twersky at the NCSY Kollel in Israel.

== Published works ==
Sobolofsky is the author of a sefer, Reishis Koach, on Maseches Bechoros, Mekor Haberacha on major sugyos in Shas, as well as a book published by YU Press about the laws of Niddah. He is also the author of Kol Chosson: Foundations of the Jewish Wedding, which presents his notes on Maseches Kiddushin together with practical halacha based on the rulings of Hershel Schachter and Mordechai Willig. He is also a regular contributor to TorahWeb, where he has published many articles on the Weekly Torah Portion and Yomim Tovim.
