= Daniel Stein (rabbi) =

American rabbi and Rosh Yeshiva

Rabbi Daniel Stein

Rosh Yeshiva at Rabbi Isaac Elchanan Theological Seminary

Rabbi of Congregation Ahavath Chesed (Ridniker Shteibel)
- Incumbent
- Assumed office 2014
- Preceded by: Rabbi Shmuel Orenstein

Personal details
- Born: July 1976 (age 49)
- Occupation: Rabbi, Rosh Yeshiva
- Known for: Chamudei Daniel

Daniel Stein (born July 1976) is a Rabbi and Rosh Yeshiva at the Rabbi Isaac Elchanan Theological Seminary of Yeshiva University in New York City where he holds the Perez and Frieda Friedberg Chair in Talmud.

Stein received his undergraduate degree from Yeshiva University in 1998 and semikha from the Rabbi Isaac Elchanan Theological Seminary in 2002, where he studied under Rabbi Hershel Schachter. At RIETS, Stein was a member of the Wexner Semikha Honors Program and later the Wexner Kollel Elyon led by Rabbi Mordechai Willig and Rabbi Michael Rosensweig.

Stein was appointed as a Rosh Yeshiva at the Rabbi Isaac Elchanan Theological Seminary in 2009.

Stein has also been the director of the 4th Year Halakha Lemaaseh Program at RIETS since 2007, where he teaches specialized areas of practical halakha and administers tests for ordination, a post which was previously held by Rabbi Yaakov Haber and before that Rabbi Solomon Drillman.

Since 2014, Stein has been the Rabbi of Congregation Ahavath Chesed, known as the Ridniker Shteibel, a historic synagogue on the Upper West Side of Manhattan, where he succeeds Rabbi Shmuel Orenstein, a disciple of Rabbi Baruch Ber Leibowitz, and Rabbi Binyomin Halberstam, a descendant of Rabbi Chaim Halberstam. Before that, Stein was the founding Rabbi of Kehillas Beis Sholom in Clifton, New Jersey, where he served for four years.

Stein is a prolific scholar, with hundreds of lectures and articles on Jewish law and thought available online. He is the author of a sefer entitled, Chamudei Daniel, which contains essays on the weekly Torah portion.

== Articles ==
- The Limits of Religious Optimism: The Hazon Ish and the Altar of Novardok on Bittahon in Tradition 43:2 2010
- "Halachic Aspects of Visiting the Temple Mount" in Journal of Halacha and Contemporary Society, Fall 2002
- "Relying on Kashrut Organizations for Separation of Terumot and Maasrot" in Journal of Halacha and Contemporary Society, Fall 2000.
- Are Vaping and E-Cigarettes Kosher?
