= Baruch Simon =

Rabbi Baruch Simon is a rosh yeshiva at the Rabbi Isaac Elchanan Theological Seminary (RIETS), part of Yeshiva University in New York City.

He is the Colonel Jehiel R. Elyachar Professor of Talmud at Yeshiva University’s Mazer School of Talmudic Studies. He received rabbinic ordination (semikha) from the Rabbi Isaac Elchanan Theological Seminary (RIETS) in 1988. An alumnus of Yeshiva University High School, he earned his B.A. in Judaic Studies, magna cum laude, from Yeshiva College.

He later became a fellow of both the Caroline and Joseph Gruss Kollel Elyon and the Katz Kollel. Prior to joining the Yeshiva Program faculty, Rabbi Simon taught Halakha at the Isaac Breuer College of Hebraic Studies at Yeshiva University. He had a close relationship with Rabbi Yitzchak Abadi.

He is the author of multiple volumes published under the title Imrei Baruch.
