= Fred Rosner =

American medical academic (1935–2024)

Fred Rosner (October 3, 1935 – July 2024) was an American professor of medicine at Mount Sinai School of Medicine and the director of the Department of Medicine at Queens Hospital Center. He was also the chairman of the Medical Ethics Committee of the State of New York. He was, moreover, an expert on Jewish medical ethics and on the medical writings of Moses Maimonides.

== Life and career ==
Rosner was born in Berlin, Germany, where, at the age of three, he and his brother were on the last of the Kindertransport boats to the United Kingdom. After the end of the Second World War, Rosner immigrated to the United States and went to Yeshiva University High School for Boys and then Yeshiva University. He qualified as an MD at the Albert Einstein College of Medicine, with the first graduating class in 1959.

He was a diplomate of the American Board of Internal Medicine and was board certified in his specialty of hematology. Among his many awards are the American Medical Association's Isaac Hays, MD, and John Bell, MD, Award for Leadership in Ethics and Professionalism; the Bernard Revel Memorial Award from the Yeshiva College Alumni Association for Distinguished Achievement in the Arts & Sciences; and the Lawrence D. Redway Award for Excellence in Medical Writing from the Medical Society of New York.

Rosner published eight books on Jewish medical ethics, including Modern Medicine and Jewish Ethics (Ktav, 1991); Medicine and Jewish Law I, II and III (Jason Aronson, 1990 and 1993); Pioneers in Jewish Medical Ethics (Jason Aronson, 1997); and Biomedical Ethics and Jewish Law (Ktav, 2001). He also translated Avraham Steinberg's seven-volume Encyclopedia Hilchatit Refuit from Hebrew into English as the Encyclopedia of Jewish Medical Ethics.

His other books include: an English translation of Julius Preuss's classic reference work Biblical and Talmudic Medicine (reprinted in 1993) and the Encyclopedia of Medicine in the Bible and the Talmud (Jason Aronson, 2000). He is also the translator and editor of Moses Maimonides' Medical Writings (seven volumes published by the Maimonides Research Institute, Haifa), A Medical Encyclopedia of Moses Maimonides (Jason Aronson, 1998), and The Medical Legacy of Moses Maimonides (Ktav, 1998). Dr. Rosner was recognized as an authority on this giant of Jewish thought and medieval medicine.

He also published almost 800 articles and thirty-nine chapters in books on all aspects of Jewish medical ethics and Jewish medical history, and on many other topics, including haematology, leukemia, anaemia, immunology, and general medicine.

Rosner was an internationally known authority on medical ethics, having lectured widely on Jewish medical ethics throughout USA, and served as visiting professor or lecturer in Israel, England, France, Germany, Mexico, Canada, the Netherlands, South Africa, New Zealand and Australia. He died in July 2024, at the age of 88.

== Personal life ==
Rosner married Saranne Rosner and had four children: Rabbi Shalom Rosner, Mitch Rosner, Aviva Taragin, and Miriam Goldberg.
