= Jacob Bosniak =

Jacob Bosniak (December 1, 1887 – August 25, 1963) was a Russian-born American rabbi from Brooklyn, New York City.

== Life ==
Bosniak was born on December 1, 1887, in Gorodetz, Russia, the son of Abraham L. Bosniak and Bessie Golub. He immigrated to America in 1905.

Bosniak attended the Yeshivas of Maltz and Krinik. He then went to the Rabbi Isaac Elchanan Theological Seminary in New York City, where he received semikhah in 1906. He received a B.S. from New York University in 1914 and an M.A. from Columbia University in 1916. He was ordained a rabbi at the Jewish Theological Seminary of America in 1917. He was president of the Morais-Blumenthal Society at the Seminary from 1915 to 1916. He served as rabbi of Congregation Shearith Israel in Dallas, Texas, from 1916 to 1920 and as camp rabbi of Love Field and Camp Dick in Dallas from 1918 to 1919. While in Dallas, he was president of the B'nai B'rith Dallas lodge in 1919, vice-president of the International Club in 1918, an executive committee member of the Dallas chapter of the Red Cross Home Service in 1917, and a member of the first American Jewish Congress in 1919.

In 1921, Bosniak became rabbi of Ocean Parkway Jewish Center in Brooklyn, New York. He served as rabbi there for the next 28 years. He also served as president of the Brooklyn Board of Rabbis from 1938 to 1940, chairman of the Rabbinical Assembly's Rabbinic Ethics Committee from 1945 to 1948, and a dayan and director of the Jewish Conciliation Board of America. Seeing a need for a uniform siddur with modern English translations, he published several prayer books that gained wide acceptance in the Conservative Jewish community and edited Prayers of Israel in 1925 and Anthology of Prayer in 1958. He also published Interpreting Jewish Life: The Sermons and Addresses of Jacob Bosniak in 1944 and a critical edition The Commentary of David Kimhi on the Fifth Book of Psalms in 1954. He retired as rabbi in 1949, after which he was elected rabbi emeritus and devoted himself to Jewish scholarship.

Bosniak was a member of the Synagogue Council of America, an auxiliary chaplain of the Ellis Island Coast Guard Station, a board member of Israel Zion Hospital, president of the Zionist Organization of America, District 42, a member of the New York Board of Rabbis, principal of the Hebrew Sunday Schools of the Ocean Parkway Jewish Center, chaplain of the U.S. Marine Hospital, and a member of the New York Board of Jewish Ministers, the American Academy of Jewish Research, and the Academy of Jewish Studies for Adults. In 1919, he married Suzanne Halpin. Their children were Betty Lucille and Naomi Eve.

Bosniak died in Maimonides Hospital on August 25, 1963. He was buried in Mount Lebanon Cemetery.
