= Yeshiva Ketana =

Yeshiva Ketana may refer to:

- Cheder or Talmud Torah, a Jewish elementary school
- Mesivta, a Jewish secondary school

== See also ==
- Jewish day school
- Yeshiva gedola
