= Macy Nulman =

Macy Nulman (1923 – November 29, 2011) was an American Orthodox cantor and a scholar of Jewish music and Jewish liturgy.

== Personal background ==
Nulman was married to Sarah, with whom he raised Judy Z. Nulman-Koenigsberg (married to David I. Koenigsberg) and Efrem Nulman (married to Rochelle).

== Professional background ==
Aside from once serving as cantor of Anshei Sefard Congregation of Boro Park, Etz Chaim of Flatbush, and several other congregations in the United States, he served as the director of the Philip and Sarah Belz School of Jewish Music at Yeshiva University until his retirement (1983). He has taught Jewish music at Brooklyn College and appeared on several educational radio and television programs. Nulman, among others, founded the Cantorial Council of America (the sister organization of the Rabbinical Council of America), and he served for some time as the editor of the Journal of Jewish Music and Liturgy. Articles of his ranged from the scholarly to the popular, writing several articles on Jewish liturgy for MyJewishLearning.com.

== Published works ==
- Concise Encyclopedia of Jewish Music (1975), Mcgraw Hill
- Concepts of Jewish Music and Prayer (1985)
- Encyclopedia of Jewish Prayer: Ashkenazic and Sephardic Rites (1993)
