= Zevulun Charlop =

American rabbi (1929–2024)

Rabbi Zevulun Charlop

Personal life
- Born: December 14, 1929
- Died: January 16, 2024 (aged 94)

Religious life
- Religion: Judaism
- Denomination: Orthodox

Jewish leader
- Synagogue: Young Israel of Mosholu Parkway
- Yeshiva: Rabbi Isaac Elchanan Theological Seminary (RIETS)
- Residence: The Bronx, New York

Zevulun Charlop (December 14, 1929 – January 16, 2024) was an American rabbi, who served as dean of Rabbi Isaac Elchanan Theological Seminary (RIETS), an affiliate of Yeshiva University (YU). He was also president of several major Jewish organizations, in the United States and Israel.

== Education and career ==
=== Early life ===
Charlop was born in 1929 the Bronx to Yechiel Michael Charlop. His father was ordained at Rabbi Isaac Elchanan Theological Seminary (RIETS), the same institution his son would later administer. The elder Charlop served in pulpits around the United States in the early 1920s, but had come back to New York City to be rabbi of the Bronx Jewish Center several years before the younger Charlop was born. The family has a long tradition of rabbinics and claims to trace its ancestry to King David.

Zevulun Charlop attended Yeshiva Salanter (later merged into SAR Academy) in the Bronx for elementary school, and Talmudical Academy for high school.

Charlop was admitted to Yeshiva University in the 1940s, when its seminary's religious leadership was primarily Eastern European. He was ordained there, and also earned secular degrees at the affiliated Yeshiva College in 1951 and at Columbia University.

=== Academic work ===
Charlop taught Talmud at the James Striar School, in his earliest staff role at Yeshiva University. He was also editor of the school's alumni's scholarly jourmal, Chavrusa.

He was appointed dean of RIETS in 1971 on the retirement of his predecessor, Reuven Aberman. The position is formally the Max and Marian Grill Dean of the Rabbi Issac Elchanan Theological Seminary. Charlop served in that role for 37 years.

By the time he retired in 2008, the seminary had more than doubled its student body, and its leadership was primarily developed from within its own ranks. Yeshiva called him an architect of the university.

"Turning a yeshiva into a big tent can be a dangerous thing; if we start lessening our inward Torah focus then we may start neutralizing learning and, rahamana litslan, yir’as shamayim [God have mercy, our fear of heaven]. In order to be able to sustain the multifaceted world that we have here in Yeshiva, we have to be deeper in the core. So long as we know that in this process we may be willy-nilly, lightening the thrust of our Torah learning, then widening the tent cannot be achieved. Rather, we must widen and, indeed, deepen our Torah learning and kiyyum ha-mitsvos [fulfill the commandments] at the core."

In May 2008, upon retirelemt, Charlop received Yeshiva University's (YU) Presidential Medallion in recognition of his stewardship of RIETS. Under his leadership of more than 35 years, the seminary experienced enormous growth, graduating thousands of rabbis, educators, and Jewish scholars.

In September 2008, Charlop was honored for his extraordinary achievement in Torah learning and leadership as the seminary's dean at YU's RIETS Annual Dinner of Tribute. Sefer Zeved Tov, a collection of essays by Roshei Yeshiva and students in his honor, was published for this occasion. Additionally, Sefer Shefa Yamim, a collection of many of Charlop's essays, was published in limited release for this occasion. As Dean Emeritus, Charlop continued to serve as one of RIETS’ masmichim — conferring semikhah on rabbinical candidates – and giving exit bechinos (academic exams), and maintained his special relationship with the Kollelei Elyon. He also served as special advisor to the YU President on yeshiva affairs with cabinet rank.

After his retirement, Charlop remained dean emeritus and formally a special advisor on seminary affairs to the university’s president.

=== Other roles ===
Charlop was also the rabbi of the Young Israel of Mosholu Parkway in the Bronx, New York, until the synagogue closed. He started there is 1966 with a lifetime contract. The building was sold in 2015.

In addition to his role as dean of the religious seminary, Charlop also taught American history at the college. He wrote articles for Encyclopedia Judaica and Yeshiva University's Torah U-Madda Journal.

Among his duties outside the pulpit and the university, Charlop president of the American Committee for the United Charities in Israel, Jerusalem's General Israel Orphans Home for Girls, and the National Council of Young Israel Rabbis.

After his death, RIETS created the Metzuyanim Fund in a memory, a fund created to provide scholarships for RIETS students.

== Works ==
Charlop wrote the Encyclopedia Judaica article, The Making of Orthodox Rabbis.

Yeshiva University published Sefer Shefa Yamim, a collection of Charlop's essays, coordinated with his retirement tribute dinner.

Charlop was the editor of three collections of novellae on Torah and Talmud by his late father, Yechiel Michael Charlop.

== Personal life ==
Charlop was the grandson of Yaakov Moshe Charlap, a leading Jerusalem rabbi in the first half of the twentieth century, and head of a well-known yeshiva there.

Charlop resided in the Bronx, a borough of New York City, for most of his life, where he was the rabbi of the Young Israel of Mosholu Parkway.

He had eight children with his wife Judith, who died in 1999, including two sons and six daughters. His sons are Alexander Ziskind Charlop and Zev Charlop, who are also rabbis. His daughters are Peshi Neuburger, Leebee Rochelle Becher, Annie Riva Prager, Shoshana Schneider, Zipporah Raymon and Miriam Reiss.

In his last few years, after the closing of the synagogue in 2015, he lived near his children in Monsey, NY. Charlop died on January 16, 2024, at the age of 94.
