= Ocean Parkway Jewish Center =

Orthodox synagogue in Brooklyn, New York

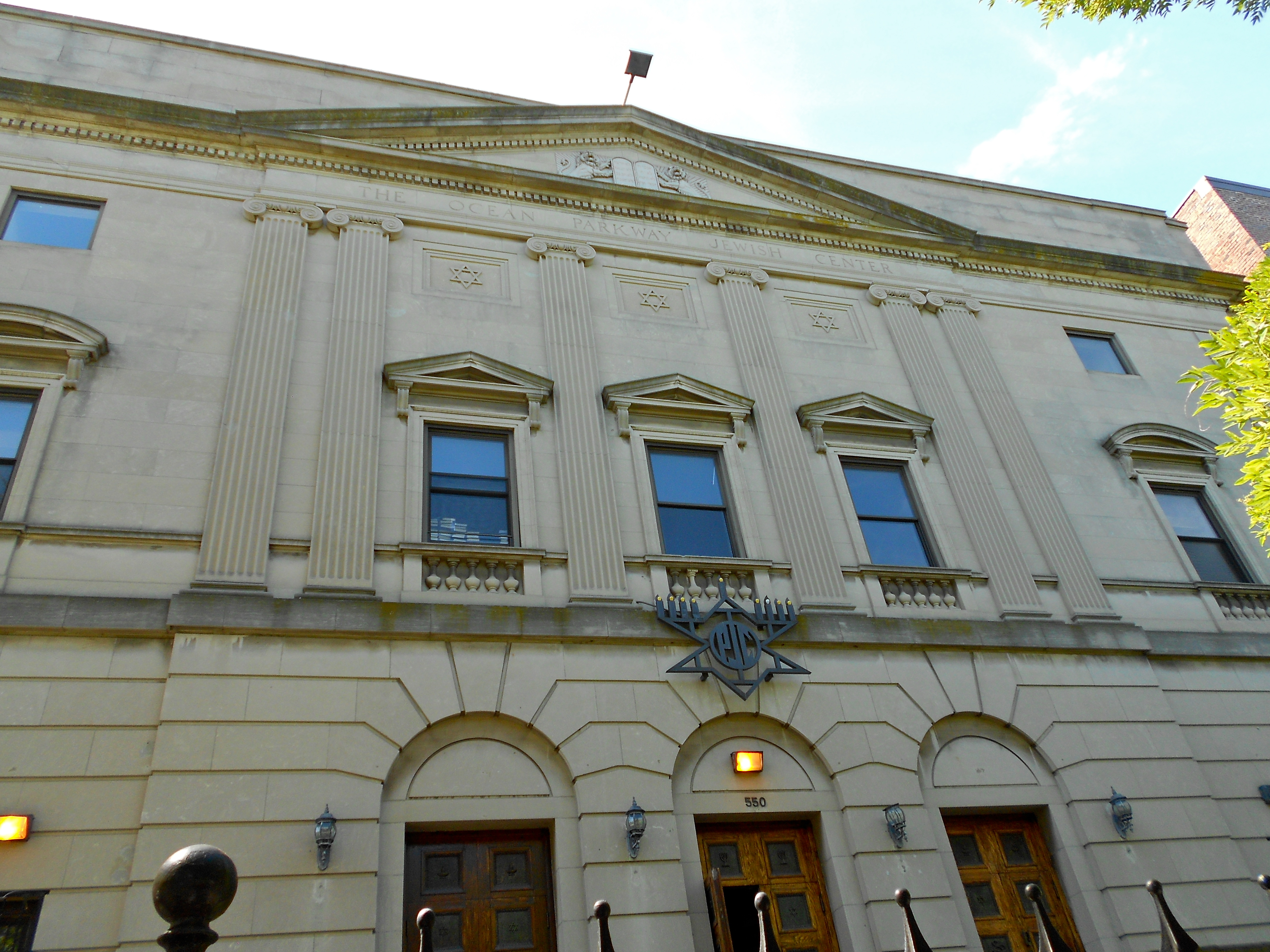
- Ocean Parkway synagogue

- Location in New York City

Religion
- Affiliation: Orthodox Judaism
- Ecclesiastical or organisational status: Synagogue
- Status: Active

Location
- Location: 550 Ocean Parkway, Kensington, Brooklyn, New York City, New York 11218
- Country: United States
- Coordinates: 40°38′4″N 73°58′23″W

Architecture
- Architects: Samuel Malkind; Martyn Weinstein
- Type: Synagogue
- Style: Neoclassical
- Established: 1907 (as the First Congregation of Kensington); 1924 (merged congregation)
- Completed: 1926
- Construction cost: $450,000

Website
- opjc.net
- Ocean Parkway Jewish Center
- U.S. National Register of Historic Places
- New York State Register of Historic Places
- Area: less than one acre
- NRHP reference No.: 09001082
- NYSRHP No.: 04701.016562

Significant dates
- Added to NRHP: December 11, 2009
- Designated NYSRHP: October 28, 2009

The Ocean Parkway Jewish Center is an Orthodox Jewish synagogue located at 550 Ocean Parkway, in Kensington, Brooklyn, New York City, New York, United States.

The synagogue was built between 1924 and 1926 and is a three-story plus basement and attic, stone clad Neoclassical style building, with a two-story addition. The front façade features three round-arched entrances and the second and third stories are organized as a temple front. It was listed on the National Register of Historic Places in 2009. The building was designed by Samuel Malkind and Martyn Weinstein. Malkind had worked for Louis Abramson's firm before starting his own practice with Weinstein and the design followed a pattern set by Abramson, "combining neo-Classical ornament with Judaic symbols".

The chairman and Director is Allen Michaels.

== History ==
The synagogue was established following the 1924 merger of its predecessors, the First Congregation of Kensington, founded 1907, and the West Flatbush Jewish Center. The two synagogues, located about two blocks apart from each other (Ditmas and Dahill Roads, and East 2nd Street near Ditmas, respectively) had outgrown their spaces, and purchased seven lots on Ocean Parkway immediately within one month of joining forces. The building was completed in 1926, at a total cost of around $450,000. At the time, it was named, The Ocean Parkway Jewish Center of the First Congregation of Kensington Tiphereth Israel.

The Ocean Parkway Jewish Center was previously affiliated with Conservative Judaism under Rabbi Jacob Bosniak's leadership for nearly 30 years. His sermons during the 1940s informed congregants about the catastrophe of the Holocaust (ref: Interpreting Jewish Life: The Sermons and Addresses of Jacob Bosniak). The congregation is presently Orthodox.
