= Tal Politis =

- טל פוליטיס
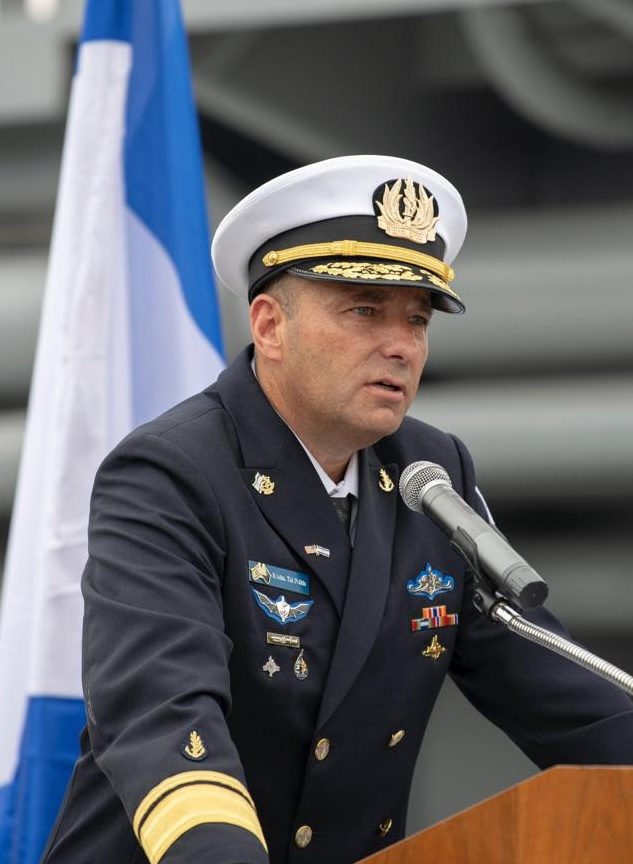
- Born: November 22, 1976 (age 49); Neve Dekalim, Gush Katif
- Alma mater: University of Haifa
- Spouse: Married (four children)
- Military career
- Allegiance: Israel
- Branch: Israeli Navy
- Service years: 1995–present
- Rank: Aluf (Major General)
- Commands: Shayetet 13; Brigade 55; Haifa Base; Sea Division; Staff Division of the Navy
- Conflicts: Second Lebanon War; Operation Skies of Heaven; Swords of Iron War
- Awards: Chief of Staff Citation (unit)

Tal Politis (Hebrew: טל פוליטיס; born November 22, 1976) is an IDF officer with the rank of Tat Aluf (Brigadier General). He served as Head of the Staff Division of the Navy, Commander of the Sea Division, Commander of the Haifa Base, Head of the Planning Department in the Planning Directorate (Agat), Commander of Shayetet 13 (Flotilla 13), and Commander of Brigade 55.

== Biography ==
Politis grew up in Neve Dekalim in Gush Katif. He is the son of Colonel Shlomo Politis, who served as the Legal Advisor for the Judea and Samaria Area. In 1994, at about the age of 17, he won the International Bible Contest for Jewish Youth, following in the footsteps of his father, who came in sixth place in the contest in 1969.

He studied at the Or Etzion Military Boarding School for Command and at the "Otzem" pre-military preparatory academy, which was located in Gush Katif. He enlisted in the IDF in March 1995 and volunteered for Shayetet 13. He completed the commando training track in the Shayetet and then attended an infantry officers' course. Upon completing the course, he returned to the Shayetet and was appointed team commander. After finishing his training at the Naval Command School, he served as a GNK officer (detection, navigation and communications) aboard the INS Yaffo. He was later appointed commander of the missile ship INS Kidon, which he commanded between 2004 and 2005. In his next role, he served as deputy commander of the Golani Reconnaissance Battalion (Gadsar Golani) between 2005 and 2006, including during the Second Lebanon War.

In 2007 he was promoted to the rank of Sgan Aluf (Lieutenant Colonel) and appointed commander of the training company in Shayetet 13, a position he held until 2009. In 2009 he was appointed commander of a combatants' company in Shayetet 13, which he led, among other operations, in Operation Skies of Heaven (Ruchot Shamayim). He held this position until 2011. After a period of study, he was appointed deputy commander of Shayetet 13 and served in this role between 2014 and 2016. On April 12, 2016, he was promoted to the rank of Aluf Mishne (Colonel) and appointed commander of Brigade 55, while concurrently serving as a team commander in the company commanders' and battalion commanders' course. Politis served in these roles until August 2, 2017. On that day he was appointed commander of Shayetet 13, a position in which he served until July 31, 2019. During his tenure, Shayetet 13 was awarded the Chief of Staff Citation (Tzalash HaRamatkal). In 2019 he was appointed Head of the Planning Department in the Planning Directorate (Agat), and served in this role until 2021.

On August 1, 2021, he was promoted to the rank of Tat Aluf (Brigadier General) and appointed commander of the Haifa Base. In September 2023 he was appointed chief of staff of the Israeli Navy, and he concluded his tenure in October 2024 after leading the division during the Swords of Iron War. On November 26, 2024, he was appointed Head of the Staff Division of the Navy. In April 2026 he concluded his role.

In June 2026, it was decided to appoint him as the IDF attaché in the United States and to promote him to the rank of Aluf.

== Personal life ==
Politis is married and a father of four, residing in the community settlement of Nehusha. He holds a bachelor's degree in political science and a master's degree in social sciences, both from the University of Haifa. He is an amateur runner and has, among other things, participated in several marathon races.
