= Nisson Alpert =

American rabbi

Rabbi Nisson Alpert

Personal life
- Born: 1927 Polanka, Poland
- Died: May 25, 1986 (aged 57–58) New York City
- Buried: Har Hazeisim, Jerusalem
- Spouse: Zeldi Scheinberg
- Parent(s): Rabbi Shabsai Alpert, Guta Yachne Joselowitz

Religious life
- Religion: Judaism
- Denomination: Orthodox
- Synagogue: Agudath Israel of Long Island
- Yeshiva: RIETS
- Semikhah: Rabbi Moshe Feinstein

Nisson Alpert (1927 – May 25, 1986) was an American rabbi who was Rosh Yeshiva at the Rabbi Isaac Elchanan Theological Seminary.

== Biography ==
Nisson Lipa Alpert was born in 1927 in Polanka, a small shtetl in Poland. He was named after his maternal grandfather Nisson Lipa Joselowitz, rosh yeshiva in Lazday, Poland, and later the rabbi of Polanka. His father Rabbi Shabsai Alpert was a student of the Mir Yeshiva and cousin of Rabbi Yisrael Meir Kagan, the Chofetz Chaim. His mother was Guta Yachne Joselowitz. He had three sisters: Rita, Sarah, and Freida.

Alpert's father decided to move his family to the United States, and traveled there ahead of his family. However, World War II broke out before everyone could come. In December 1939, his mother and family crossed the border to Lithuania. Rebbetzin Alpert obtained one of the first transit visas from Chiune Sugihara, and crossed Russia with the family to Japan. From there they traveled to San Francisco, and finally to the Lower East Side of New York City.

Although Alpert arrived in America at the age of 12 with no knowledge of English, he graduated Washington Irving High School as valedictorian of his class. He learned at Mesivtha Tifereth Jerusalem, where he became a very close disciple of Rabbi Moshe Feinstein.

Alpert was one of the founders of Peylim.

He first was rabbi of the East Third Street Shul on the Lower East Side, and later became the rav of Agudath Israel of Long Island. In 1967, he was appointed as a Rosh Yeshiva at the Rabbi Isaac Elchanan Theological Seminary, before becoming the first Rosh Kollel of its Kollel L’Horaah— Yadin-Yadin. He was a great Torah scholar.

In 1983, the Alperts suffered the sudden loss of their 19-year-old son Yishaya Mendel.

A resident of Far Rockaway, Queens, Alpert died at the age of 58 on May 25, 1986. about two months after the passing of his mentor, Rabbi Moshe Feinstein. He is buried on Har Hazeisim in Jerusalem.

== Writings ==
- Beit Habechirah of the Meiri on Bava Metzia.
- Commentary of the Raavad on Bava Metzia.
- Limmudei Nissan on the Torah and on Tractate Beitzah.
