= Dovid Lifshitz =

American rabbi

Rabbi Dovid Lifshitz
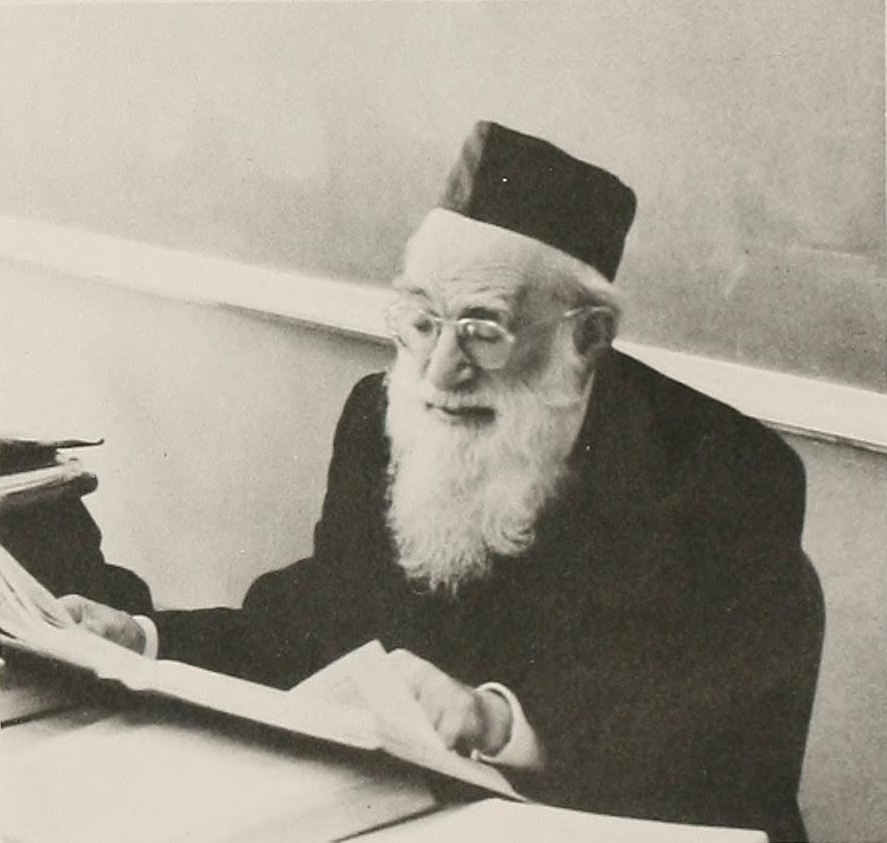

Personal life
- Born: 1906 Minsk, Russian Empire
- Died: June 28, 1993 (aged 86–87) New York City, United States
- Buried: Israel
- Spouse: Tzipporah Chava Yoselowitz
- Children: Chaya Waxman, Shulamith Kaminetsky, Sara Stein

Religious life
- Religion: Judaism
- Denomination: Orthodox

Jewish leader
- Position: Rosh Yeshiva
- Yeshiva: RIETS
- Organisation: Ezras Torah

Dovid Lifshitz (1906–1993) was a distinguished Ashkenazi Rosh yeshiva in the Rabbi Isaac Elchanan Theological Seminary (RIETS) for almost fifty years. He was appointed upon the invitation of Rabbi Samuel Belkin in 1944. He was also known as the "Suvalker Rav", due to his previous position as the Rabbi of the European town of Suvalk, which he maintained until its capture by the Nazis in 1940. Some of his lectures on the Talmud were later compiled and published as "Shiurei Rav Dovid Lifshitz".

== Early years ==
Dovid Lifshitz was born in Minsk, then Imperial Russia in 1906 to Yaakov Aryeh and Ittel Lifshitz. His paternal grandfather, Shlomo Zalman Lifshitz, was a businessman in Grodno as well as a distinguished Talmudic scholar, who authored the Olas Shlomo. He attended cheder together with Avraham Even-Shoshan, where they learned Hebrew and Hebrew grammar from Avraham's father, who was the teacher. In 1919, his family moved to Grodno, where he was a foremost student of the famed Rabbi Shimon Shkop in the Grodno Yeshiva (Shaar Hatorah). He later studied in the Mir yeshiva, staying until 1932, receiving semicha and becoming well known as an outstanding scholar. In 1933, he married Tzipporah Chava Yoselowitz, the daughter of the renowned rabbi of Suvalk, Yosef Yoselowitz. Upon the death of his father-in-law in 1935, Lifshitz became chief rabbi of the important city and its 27 congregations, where he developed a reputation as a warm and involved spiritual leader, concerned with all Jews. He remained in Suvalk until the Nazis captured the city in 1940.

== Relocation to America ==
In 1941, Lifshitz reached America along with his wife and daughter, and was appointed a rosh yeshiva of Beis Midrash LeTorah in Chicago. Lifshitz was soon accorded immense stature among his fellow rabbis, his students and the rest of the Chicago community. His reputation as an outstanding rosh yeshiva spread throughout America and he received offers for several positions. He accepted the invitation of Rabbi Samuel Belkin and in 1944, was appointed rosh yeshiva of RIETS in New York City. There he taught Torah for almost 50 years to thousands of students, many of whom came to be distinctively known as "Reb Dovid's students". His efforts on behalf of the community were numerous. He served as a member of the presidium of the Agudas HaRabbonim of America and Canada for many years.

Lifshitz's discourses in Jewish concepts such as chochma and mussar were compiled and published by his students and given the title "Tehillah LeDovid". His lectures on the Talmud were also published as "Shiurei Rav Dovid Lifshitz".

== Ezras Torah ==
Lifshitz served as president of Ezras Torah, an international relief fund, during the final 17 years of his life.

== Family ==
A daughter was murdered as an infant in 1941. Lifshitz is survived by his wife, three daughters, "16 grandchildren, and numerous great-grandchildren."

== Publications ==
- Shiurei Rav Dovid Lifshitz - Chulin, 5753
- Tehillah LeDovid, 5754
- Shiurei Rav Dovid Lifshitz - Gittin, Kiddushin, Makkos, 5755
