= Jeremy Wieder =

American rabbi (born 1971)

Rabbi Jeremy Wieder
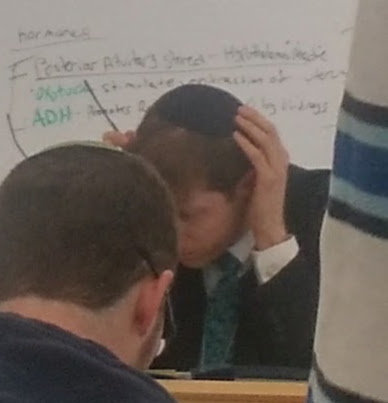

Personal life
- Born: Kenneth Jeremy Wieder; February 1971 (age 55)
- Education: Yeshiva University

Religious life
- Religion: Judaism
- Denomination: Modern Orthodox

Jewish leader
- Position: Rosh Yeshiva
- Yeshiva: Yeshiva University
- Residence: Teaneck, New Jersey, U.S.

Kenneth Jeremy Wieder (born February 1971, also RKJW) is a Rosh Yeshiva (dean) at the Rabbi Isaac Elchanan Theological Seminary (RIETS) of Yeshiva University.in Manhattan, New York. He holds the Gwendolyn and Joseph Straus Chair in Talmud.

Wieder was one of the first Americans to win the International Bible Contest, and later graduated summa cum laude from Yeshiva College in 1991, and received an M.S. in American Jewish history from the Bernard Revel Graduate School of Jewish Studies and rabbinic ordination from RIETS in 1994. In 2005, he received a PhD in Hebrew and Judaic Studies at New York University. He is a resident of Teaneck, New Jersey.
