= Rabbi Isaac Elchanan Theological Seminary =

Jewish theological seminary in New York

- ישיבת רבינו יצחק אלחנן
- Type: Private; Rabbinical seminary
- Parent institution: Yeshiva University
- Religious affiliation: Judaism (Orthodox)
- Dean: Rabbis Aryeh Lebowitz (Torah dean) and Yosef Kalinsky (administrative dean)
- Location: New York City, NY, USA; 40°51′2.9″N 73°55′46.21″W
- Website: www.yu.edu/riets/

Rabbi Isaac Elchanan Theological Seminary (RIETS /riːts/) is the rabbinical seminary of Yeshiva University (YU). It is located along Amsterdam Avenue in the Washington Heights neighborhood of Manhattan, New York City.

Named after Yitzchak Elchanan Spektor, the school's Hebrew name is Yeshivas Rabbeinu Yitzchok Elchonon (Hebrew: ישיבת רבינו יצחק אלחנן). The name in Hebrew characters appears on the seals of all YU affiliates.

== History ==
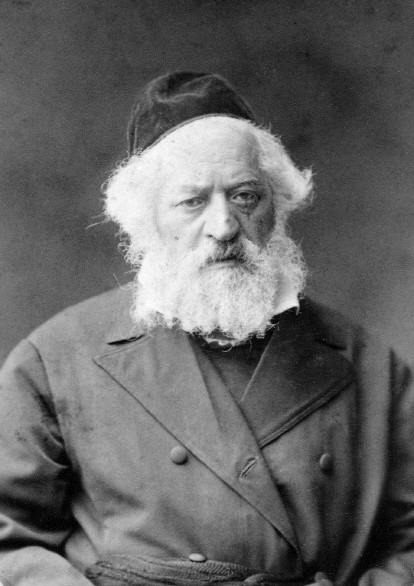
Yitzchak Elchanan Spektor, namesake of the Seminary

The first Jewish schools in New York were Etz Hayyim and Rabbi Elnathan's, on the Lower East Side. In 1896, several New York and Philadelphia rabbis agreed that a rabbinical seminary based on the traditional European yeshiva structure was needed to produce American rabbis who were fully committed to what would come to be called Orthodox Judaism. There were only two rabbinical seminaries in the United States, Hebrew Union College, which followed Reform Judaism, and the Jewish Theological Seminary, which was first affiliated with the more established Orthodox community in America and later Conservative Judaism. Bernard L. Levinthal and other leading Orthodox rabbis of the day founded the school, calling it the Rabbinical College of America (not related to the current institution of that name). In 1915, it merged with an elementary school, the Eitz Chaim Yeshiva, and its name was changed to Rabbi Isaac Elchanan Theological Seminary (RIETS), named after Yitzchak Elchanan Spektor, a Russian rabbi who died the year of the school's founding. Bernard Revel was appointed as head of the combined school. In 1916 it expanded to include a boy's high school, the Talmudical Academy. In the late 1920s, the institution began a building campaign of US$5 million, announcing an institution called the "Yeshiva of America", later the "Yeshiva College of America", before finally settling simply on Yeshiva College., which would be the undergraduate college for men of what later became Yeshiva University. In 1926, it bought a three-block site in Washington Heights, built its first building, and moved its operation there. As of 2018, that building continued to house the Yeshiva University (YU) affiliated High School for Boys, but all other operations had moved to other buildings later constructed on the expanded campus surrounding it.

The high school, previously part of RIETS, became a separate entity, and RIETS became exclusively a college-level program, including granting of degrees via semikhah (rabbinical ordination). Secular studies were added, with the RIETS rosh yeshiva (dean) also serving as president of the college secular academic programs while Moshe Soloveichik served as co-head of RIETS. This arrangement continued into the 1940s. However, the second president, Samuel Belkin, legally separated the two institutions in order to obtain United States government funding and research grants for a variety of YU's secular departments due to the separation of church and state in the United States.

RIETS scholar Joseph B. Soloveitchik strongly opposed the split, but Belkin prevailed and, following the split, remained both the official rosh yeshiva of RIETS and president of YU. Despite the separation, the identities have continued to be blended Both the religious seminary and the college undergraduate Talmudic department are called RIETS, and have the same faculty and students.

With the 2003 appointment of Richard Joel, a layman, as president of YU, the dual role ended. Joel's predecessor, Norman Lamm, continued as the official rosh yeshiva of RIETS with Richard Joel being the Chief Executive and responsible for fundraising and administrative issues.

From 1971 until his retirement in 2008 the Dean of RIETS was Rabbi Zevulun Charlop. Rabbi Yona Reiss, who at the time was the director of the Beth Din of America, was appointed to replace Rabbi Charlop. With Reiss's appointment, RIETS assumed the academic administration of the men's undergraduate Torah studies programs including the Mazer Yeshiva Program, Stone Beit Midrash Program, Isaac Breuer College, and James Striar School, thereby creating one unified department known as Undergraduate Torah Studies (UTS). Rabbi Reiss served as dean until 2013 when he moved to Chicago to lead the Chicago Rabbinical Council. Following Rabbi Reiss's departure, Rabbi Menachem Penner became the dean of RIETS. Rabbi Penner served as dean until 2023, when he left his position in order to assume the role of executive vice president of the Rabbinical Council of America. In August, 2024, Rabbi Aryeh Lebowitz was appointed as the Abraham Arbesfeld Torah Dean of RIETS, and Rabbi Yosef Kalinsky was appointed as the Max and Marion Grill Administrative Dean of RIETS. Rabbi Penner currently serves as dean emeritus. .

== Program ==
The RIETS semikhah program is a structured four-year curriculum. The primary focus is on advanced Talmudic learning as well as developing a proficiency in deciding matters of classical and contemporary halakha (Jewish law; see Yeshiva § Jewish law). There are a variety of required ancillary courses, such as homiletics, pastoral counseling, and Jewish philosophy, that are intended to train students for careers as practicing rabbis. There is an honors track within the general semikhah program whereby students receive an extra stipend and are required to take additional courses.

The majority of students in the semikhah program are also enrolled in the Katz Kollel which is led by the rosh kollel, Hershel Schachter. Many RIETS students are also concurrently enrolled in a variety of other graduate degree-granting programs in law, education, academic Jewish studies, psychology, and the sciences. RIETS has two post-semikhah kollelim (referred to as the Kollel Elyon) which offer students the opportunity to study Torah at an advanced level and take supplemental courses for an additional 3 to 4 years while receiving a stipend. The roshei kollel of the Kollel Elyon are Michael Rosensweig and Mordechai Willig.

== Faculty ==
Members of the Brisker dynasty, Moshe Soloveichik and Joseph B. Soloveitchik were heads of RIETS, and Ahron Soloveichik and Aharon Lichtenstein lectured there for significant portions of their careers. Shimon Shkop taught at RIETS for a short period in 1929, as did Shlomo Polachek, Menachem Mendel Zaks, Moshe Shatzkes, Nisson Alpert, Dovid Lifshitz and Moshe David Tendler.

Later roshei yeshiva include: Hershel Schachter, Eliyahu Ben Haim, Mordechai Willig, Michael Rosensweig, Mayer Twersky, Jeremy Wieder, Yaakov Neuburger, Baruch Simon, Zvi Sobolofsky, David Hirsch, J. David Bleich, and Daniel Stein, Hershel Reichman and Ezra Schwartz.

== Chag Hasemikhah ==
Ordination can technically be conferred upon a student who completes all of the necessary requirements for semikhah at any point in time. Nonetheless, every three or four years, RIETS conducts a formal Chag Hasemikhah—an official celebration of the students who received rabbinic ordination since the previous Chag. It is traditionally held on or about the yartzeit of Isaac Elchanan Spektor which is Adar 21.

== Notable alumni ==
- Israel Bettan (1889–1957), rabbi and professor at Hebrew Union College
- Jacob Bosniak (1887–1963), rabbi of the Ocean Parkway Jewish Center in Brooklyn
- Mordechai Gifter (1915–2001), rosh yeshiva of the Telz Yeshiva in Cleveland
- Joseph Lookstein (1902–1979), rabbi of Congregation Kehilath Jeshurun in Manhattan and president of Bar-Ilan University in Israel
- Avigdor Miller (1908–2001), right-wing rabbi and author
- Emanuel Rackman (1910–2008), Modern Orthodox rabbi; President of Bar-Ilan University
- Yitzchok Scheiner (1922–2021), rosh yeshiva of the Kamenitz yeshiva of Jerusalem
- Nosson Meir Wachtfogel (1910–1998), mashgiach ruchani (spiritual supervisor) of Beth Medrash Govoha
- Irving Miller (1903-1980) American Jewish Zionist leader and rabbi

== See also ==
- Hebrew Union College – Jewish Institute of Religion
- Jewish Theological Seminary of America
- Yeshivat Chovevei Torah
