= Mordechai Willig =

Orthodox Rabbi (born 1947)

Rabbi Mordechai Willig
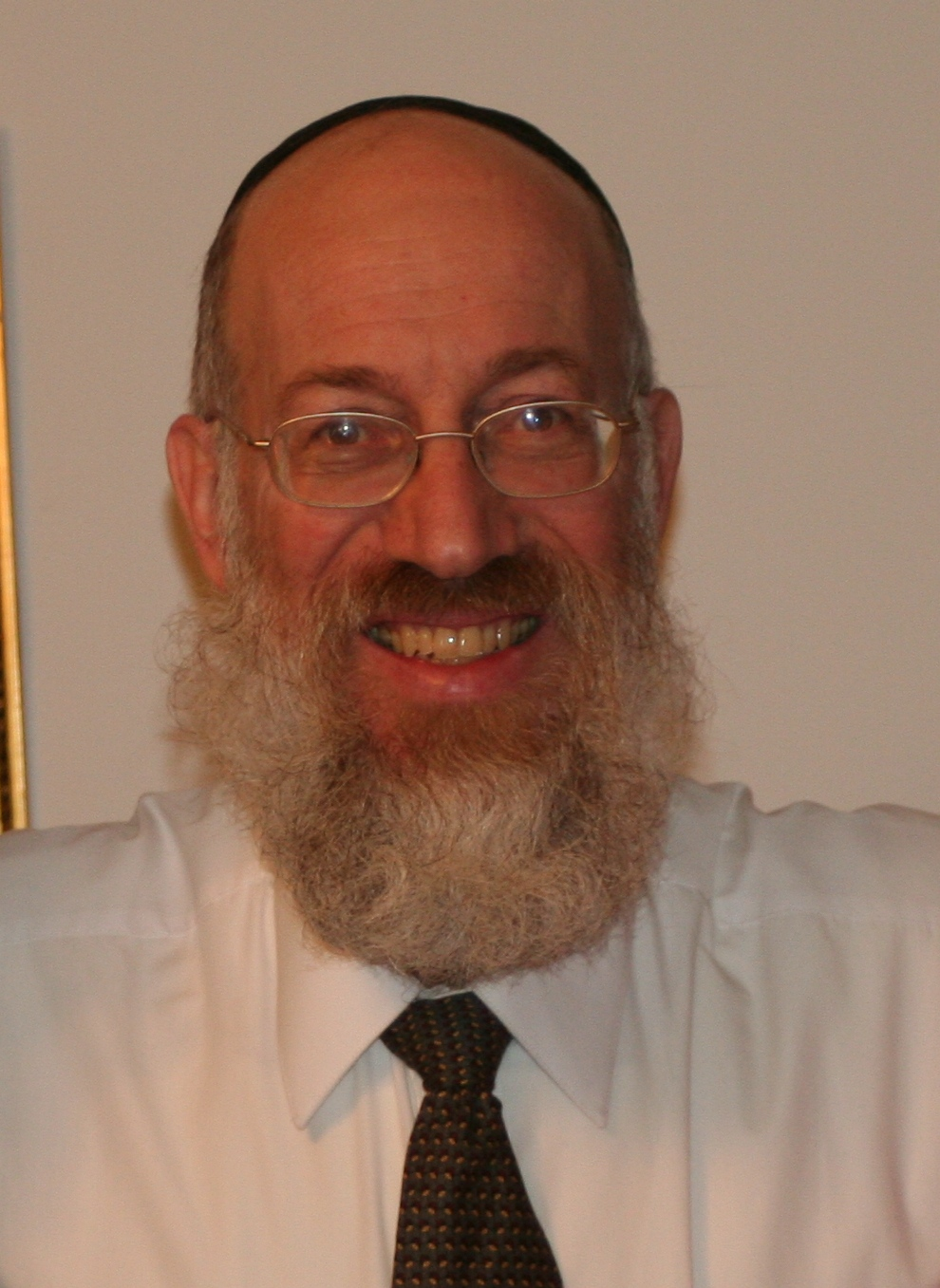

Personal life
- Born: New York City, U.S.

Religious life
- Religion: Judaism
- Denomination: Modern Orthodox

Jewish leader
- Synagogue: Young Israel of Riverdale
- Yeshiva: RIETS
- Organization: Beth Din of America
- Residence: Riverdale, New York
- Semikhah: RIETS

Mordechai Yitzchak HaLevi Willig is an American Orthodox rabbi and rosh yeshiva at Yeshiva University in Washington Heights, Manhattan. He is often known to his students as the Ramu (רמ"ו), the Hebrew acronym of his name.

== Education ==
Willig studied at Yeshivat Kerem B'Yavneh and was present at the Six-Day War in June 1967. Born in New York City, Willig graduated from Rabbi Jacob Joseph School and received a B.A. in mathematics in 1968 from Yeshiva College and an M.S. in Jewish history in 1971 from the Bernard Revel Graduate School of Jewish Studies. At Yeshiva University, he was a student of Rabbi Ahron Soloveichik and Rabbi Aharon Lichtenstein, and he primarily learned from Rabbi Joseph B. Soloveitchik.

== Professional life ==
Willig studied under Lichtenstein in the Kollel at Yeshiva University from 1968 to 1971, during Lichtenstein's last three years at YU. Lichtenstein made Aliyah in 1971 and in 1973 he offered Willig a position as a rav at Yeshivat Har Etzion. Willig travelled to the Yeshiva in Israel to give a trial shiur. At this time he received an offer from Yeshiva University from Rabbi Zevulun Charlop, and in 1973 Willig was appointed rosh yeshiva at the Mazer School of Talmudic studies at Yeshiva University and holds that position, along with the position of rosh kollel at RIETS. The position at Yeshivat Har Etzion was eventually given to Willig's former Chavruta in Lichtenstein's shiur, Rabbi Ezra Bick.

In 1976, at the behest of Rabbi Saul Berman and Rabbi Haym Soloveitchik, Yeshiva University introduced Talmud shiurim at the Stern College for Women. In 1977, Willig was recruited to teach the more advanced women.

Willig has been the rabbi and spiritual leader at the Young Israel of Riverdale Synagogue in Riverdale, The Bronx, New York since 1974. During the summer, Willig is the Rosh Kollel of the college in Morasha Kollel.

Willig is one of the leaders of the Beth Din of America, the court of the Rabbinical Council of America. He co-authored the Rabbinical Council of America's prenuptial agreement with Rabbi Zalman Nechemia Goldberg.

== Books ==
Willig is the author of a sefer, Am Mordechai, which was released in four volumes (1992 on Brachot, 2005 on Shabbat 2010 on Seder Moed and 2016 on Shulchan Aruch).

== Baruch Lanner sexual abuse case ==
In 1989, Willig led a Bet Din that heard allegations of abuse by Rabbi Baruch Lanner. The Bet Din found Lanner guilty of three minor charges and found three other charges to be unsubstantiated. The Bet Din read their determination to the litigants, to the Rabbinical Council of Bergen County, and to Lanner's two employers, the Orthodox Union and a synagogue in New Milford, New Jersey. On February 19, 2003, Willig apologized for reaching what he eventually realized to be incorrect conclusions and for other "mistakes" made during the 1989 Bet Din proceedings. He noted that since the Bet Din did not have experience adjudicating matters of abuse, they should not have agreed to take the case. A report prepared in 2000 by a special commission appointed to investigate the Orthodox Union and Willig's Bet Din role in the Lanner case critiqued the failure of taking action and thus allowing Lanner's abusive actions to "continue unchecked for many years."

== Family ==
Willig resides with his wife in Riverdale, New York. They have nine children and over 50 grandchildren. Four of his children live in Israel, teaching at various Yeshivos. His son Rabbi Yehuda Willig is the Rosh Yeshiva of the Yeshiva of South Florida.

Willig is the first cousin of Avi Weiss, the former senior Rabbi of the Hebrew Institute of Riverdale. Weiss and Willig are part of the Vaad of Riverdale.
