= Bernard Revel =

Russian-born American Orthodox rabbi and scholar (1885–1940)

Rabbi Bernard Revel
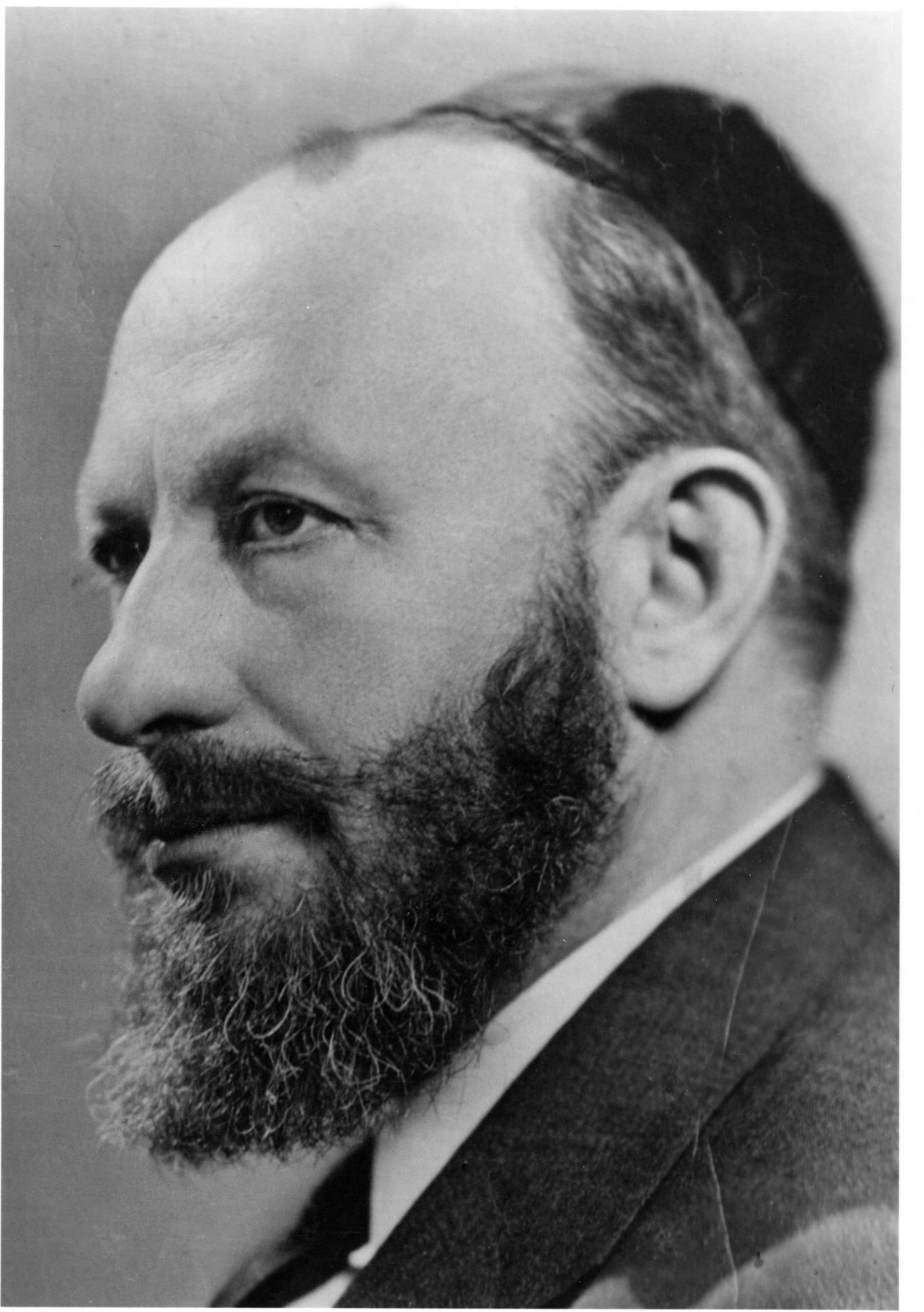

President of Yeshiva College
- In office 1915–1940
- Preceded by: Office established
- Succeeded by: Samuel Belkin
- Title: President of Yeshiva College

Personal life
- Born: September 17, 1885 Prienai, Russian Empire
- Died: December 2, 1940 (aged 55) Mount Sinai Hospital, New York, United States
- Education: New York University, Dropsie College
- Occupation: Rabbi, educator, scholar

Religious life
- Religion: Judaism
- Denomination: Orthodox

Bernard (Dov) Revel (Hebrew: ברנרד רבל; September 17, 1885 – December 2, 1940) was an Orthodox rabbi and scholar. He served as the first president of Yeshiva College from 1915 until his death in 1940. The Bernard Revel Graduate School of Jewish Studies at Yeshiva University, as well as the former Yeshiva Dov Revel of Forest Hills, are named after him.

== Early years ==
Revel was born in Prienai, a neighboring town of Kaunas, then part of the Russian Empire, now in Lithuania. He was a son of the community's Rabbi Nachum Shraga Revel. His father was his first teacher, and when Nachum Revel died in 1896 he was buried next to his close friend Rabbi Yitzchak Elchanan Spektor - indicative of his knowledge and stature.

He briefly studied in Telz Yeshiva, attending the lectures of its Rosh Yeshiva Rabbi Yosef Leib Bloch. He was also taught by the renowned Rabbi Yitzchok Blazer and learned in the Kovno kollel. Revel received semicha at the age of 16, but it is not known from whom. Thereafter, the young scholar earned a Russian high school diploma, apparently through independent study. He also became involved in the Russian revolutionary movement, and following the unsuccessful revolution of 1905, was arrested and imprisoned. Upon his release the following year, he emigrated to the United States.

== United States ==
Immediately after his arrival, Revel enrolled in New York's RIETS yeshiva. He received a Master of Arts degree from New York University in 1909. Around this time, one of America's senior rabbis and president of the Union of Orthodox Rabbis, Rabbi Bernard Levinthal of Philadelphia, visited the yeshiva and, after discussing Talmudic topics with the new student, invited him to come to Philadelphia as the rabbi's secretary and assistant. Revel accepted the post and began to familiarise himself with the alien milieu of American Jewry. At the same time, he began attending law school in Philadelphia, but eventually decided that the law was not his calling. In 1911, he earned a doctorate of philosophy from Dropsie College, the first graduate of that school; his thesis was entitled "The Karaite Halakhah and Its Relation to Sadducean, Samaritan, and Philonian Halakhah".

In November 1908, Revel was introduced to his future wife, Sarah Travis of Marietta, Ohio, whom he married in 1909. The members of the Travis family were wealthy Oklahoma oil-men, and Rabbi Revel moved to Tulsa, Oklahoma to join the family business after finishing his doctorate. However, even while serving as an assistant to his brother-in-law Solomon in the petroleum business, and amassing his own fortune, Rabbi Revel's primary occupation continued to be his Torah study.

== RIETS and Yeshiva College ==
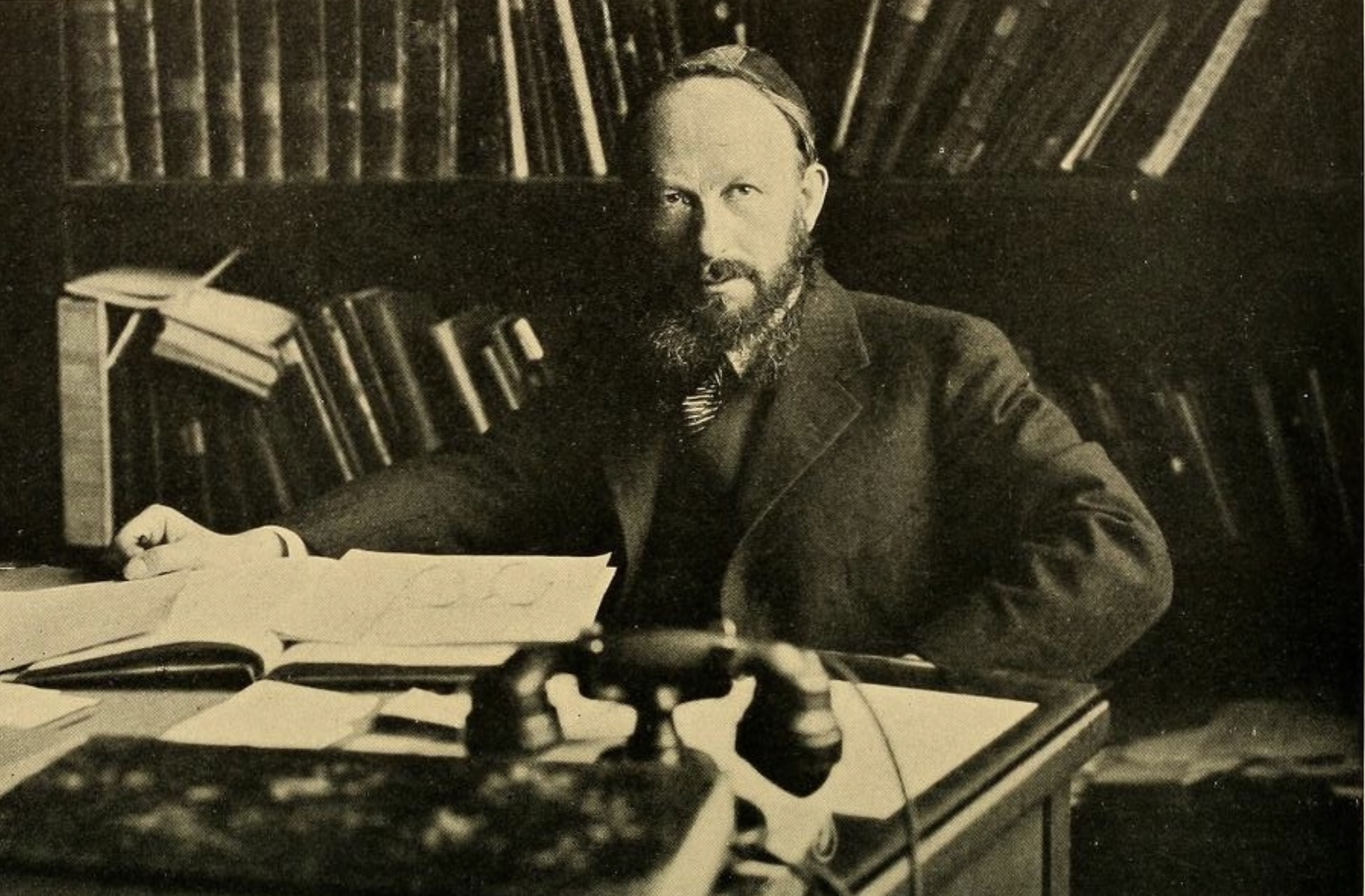

In 1915, Harry Fischel, on the board of directors of the newly merged RIETS and Etz Chaim Yeshiva, asked Revel to come back East and head the institution. In him, Mr. Fischel saw a learned and forward thinking educator to lead the yeshiva on the path of becoming a college. Rabbi Revel took up the position and was appointed the first president and Rosh yeshiva of the newly reorganized institution.

== Revel's Philosophy ==
Revel's writings and students were most important to him. However, Revel never abandoned the role of scholar to become solely an administrator, though he was known by his students as one. His research illustrates a unique usage of pilpulistic and Talmudic investigation. It was his new halakhic-historic approach, of quoting even non-rabbinic sources, such as Josephus and Philo, for context that set him apart.

Besides for his research, Revel channeled his intellect towards strengthening the foundation of Jewish Orthodoxy in America. He was most concerned with problems of maintaining traditional observance in the modern setting. He sought to build up an educational system for American Jewry where they would not feel alienated. In his speeches, Revel rarely, if ever, used difficult Torah language. Instead, he used very simple terms that were readily understandable. At a speech for the Rabbinic Council of America (RCA) Revel praised “the light of human reason”, and declared “the ascending spirit of mankind will triumph.”

Revel consistently maintained that secular knowledge in Judaism was never separate from the study of Torah. He emphasized the importance of unifying Judaism and secular studies. Often speaking of the, “harmonious union of culture and spirituality,” he believed that knowledge of the liberal arts would broaden one's understanding of Torah. However, Revel's dedication to Orthodox Jewry was undisputed. For instance, he forbade the use of a female vocalist in the 1926 Music Festival, as a female singer is a violation of Orthodox Jewish law. He did not allow Reform Jews to serve on Yeshiva College's national board of directors. He was also staunchly opposed to mixed seating in synagogues.

He wrote: "Yeshiva aims at unity, at the creation of a synthesis between the Jewish conception of life, our spiritual and moral teaching and ideals, and the present-day humanities, the scientific conscience and spirit to help develop the complete harmonious Jewish personality, once again to enrich and bless our lives, to revitalize the true spirit and genius of historic Judaism."

One of Revel's main reasons for founding RIETS and Yeshiva College was, “so that these men may not be lost to us [through assimilation].” Revel wanted Yeshiva to become a place where American Jews could feel comfortable, take pride in their religion, and not be restricted by anti-Semitic sentiments. Revel also added Bible, Hebrew, and Jewish History to the curriculum in Yeshiva College. He did this for several reasons, although one of them was to outdo Jewish Theological Seminary, a non-orthodox institution, which did not have Bible studies at the time. Although Revel viewed the liberal arts as a way to educate and integrate Jews with Torah values, he perceived the sciences as too “mechanistic” and “soulless” to be useful in integrating Judaism with secular culture.

== Karaite research ==
Revel's primary scientific scholarly interest was Karaism. His constant study and research in this area developed from his Dropsie College doctoral dissertation, The Karaite Halakhah and its Relation to Sadducean, Samaritan, and Philonian Halakhah (1912). Earlier scholars like Simha Pinksker had aimed to show that Karaites "were the source of all intellectual achievement of medieval Judaism." According to this school of thought, the Massorah, with its beginnings of grammatical and biblical exegesis, belongs to the Karaites; the Rabbanites were merely imitators. This notion was challenged by Revel.

Revel was interested in the origin of Karaism, its causes and early development. He maintained that the question of the origin of Karaism is bound up with the problem of the origin of the Karaite halakha, which is of vital importance for understanding the history of Tradition. Revel essentially traced the individual Karaite laws to their respective sources.

== Other achievements ==
Revel was a presidium member of the Union of Orthodox Rabbis from 1924, later being appointed its honorary president, and authored many articles on Jewish subjects in various Hebrew periodicals such as the Jewish Quarterly Review, Yagdil Torah, Ha-Pardes, and various Yeshiva student publications. He started writing a commentary to the Jerusalem Talmud in Philadelphia, but this was never published. He was an associate editor of Otzar Yisrael, the Hebrew Encyclopedia. In 1935 he became the first vice president of the Jewish Academy of Arts and Sciences.

In 1986, he appeared on a $1 U.S. Postage stamp, as part of the Great Americans Series. U.S. engraver Kenneth Kipperman, who designed the stamp, was suspended for including a tiny Star of David, invisible to the naked eye, in Revel's beard.

Academic offices
Preceded by office established	President of Yeshiva College/Yeshiva University; 1915 – 1940	Succeeded by Samuel Belkin
