= Samuel Belkin =

Rabbi Samuel Belkin
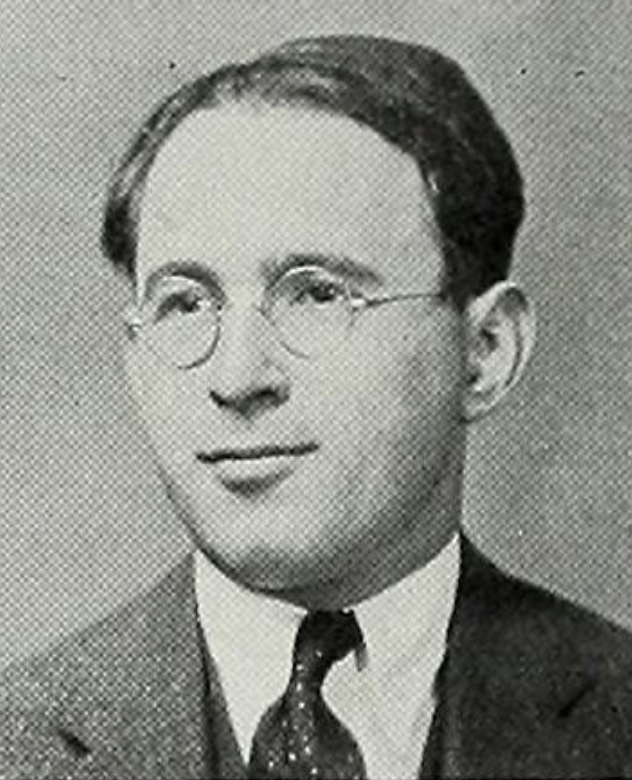
- Belkin in 1938
- Born: 12 December 1911; Svislach, Russian Empire
- Died: 19 April 1976 (aged 64); New York City, United States
- Education: Brown University (Ph.D.)
- Occupation: President of Yeshiva University
- Spouse: Selma Ehrlich; Abby Polesie
- Children: 2

Samuel Belkin (December 12, 1911 – April 19, 1976) was an American rabbi and Torah scholar who was the second President of Yeshiva University. He is credited with leading Yeshiva University through a period of substantial expansion.

== Biography ==
Belkin was born in 1911 in Svislach, Russian Empire to Solomon Belkin and Minna (Sattir) Belkin. He studied in the yeshivas of Slonim and Mir. Recognized at a young age as an illui, a genius, he was ordained as a rabbi at the age of seventeen by Yisrael Meir Kagan, the Chofetz Chaim.

As a child, he sought to leave Poland after he witnessed his father being shot by a policeman in 1919. He emigrated to the United States in 1929, studied with Harry Austryn Wolfson at Harvard and received his doctorate (concerned with the writings of Philo) at Brown University in 1935, one of the first awarded for Judaic studies in American academia. In 1940, an elaboration of his Ph.D. thesis was published with the title "Philo and the Oral Law — The Philonic Interpretation of Biblical Law in Relation to the Palestinian Halakah."

He then joined the faculty of Yeshiva College, New York, where he taught Greek. He became a full professor in 1940 and was appointed dean of its Rabbi Isaac Elchanan Theological Seminary (RIETS) the same year. In 1943, Belkin was named president of the college. Under his guidance, the institution expanded to become Yeshiva University in 1945. Belkin was a visionary who transformed Yeshiva from a small college and rabbinical seminary into a significant institution of considerable stature in Judaic Studies, natural and social sciences, and the humanities. Under his presidency, the Albert Einstein College of Medicine was opened as Yeshiva University's medical school.

As a scholar, he published many works on Jewish law and Hellenistic literature. His most significant published works are "Philo and the Oral Law" and "In His Image: The Jewish Philosophy of Man as Expressed in Rabbinic Tradition".

In his work, "In His Image," Dr. Belkin described Judaism as a Democratic Theocracy — a theocracy because the first principle of Jewish thought describes the Kingship of God, and a democracy because the Written and the Oral Law emphasize the infinite worth of each human being.

Belkin stepped down as university president in 1975. He died in 1976 in New York City after an illness. He was 64.

== Legacy ==
The Benjamin N. Cardozo School of Law gives an award to one graduating law student each year in Dr. Belkin's honor. The award recognizes the student who exemplifies the combination of excellence in leadership, scholarship and exceptional contribution to the growth and development of the law school. Past recipients of the Dr. Samuel Belkin Award include:

- Marlene Besterman (1986)
- Frank M. Esposito (1994)
- Matthew J. Kluger (1994)
- Magda M. Jimenez (1995)
- Thomas Harding (1996)
- Vsevolod "Steve" Maskin (2000)
- Alan Gotthelf (2001)
- Brandyne S. Warren (2005)
- Kimberly N. Grant (2007)
- Meghan DuPuis Maurus (2008)
- Jil Simon (2013),
- Francesca Rebecca Acocella (2016), and
- Sarah Helen Ganley (2017)

== Bibliography ==
- Belkin, Samuel. In His Image — The Jewish Philosophy of Man as Expressed in Rabbinic Tradition. London, New York, Abelard-Schuman [1960]
- Belkin, Samuel. Philo and the Oral Law — the Philonic Interpretation of Biblical Law in Relation to the Palestinian Halakah. Cambridge, Massachusetts, Harvard University Press, 1940.
- Belkin, Samuel. The Philosophy of Purpose. New York, Yeshiva University, 1958.
- Belkin, Samuel. Midrash ha-Shemot be-Filon. [New York, 1956]
- Belkin, Samuel. Essays in Traditional Jewish thought. New York: Philosophical Library [c. 1956]
- Belkin, Samuel. Midrash She´elot u-Teshuvot `al Bereshit u-Shemot le-Filon ha-Aleksandroni. New York, 1960.
- Yeshiva University. Inauguration of Rabbi Samuel Belkin, Ph.D., as President, Tuesday Afternoon, May Twenty-Third, Nineteen Hundred and Forty-Four, at Three O'clock, in the Nathan Lamport Auditorium. Easton, Pa., Printed by Mack Printing, 1945.

== Notes ==
Academic offices
Preceded by Bernard Revel	President of Yeshiva University; 1943 – 1975	Succeeded by Norman Lamm
