= Pinchas Mordechai Teitz =

Latvian-American rabbi and teacher (1908–1995)

Rabbi Pinchas Mordechai Teitz
- Born: July 7, 1908; Subat, Latvia
- Died: December 26, 1995 (aged 87); Elizabeth, New Jersey
- Education: Lithuania: Ponevez, Slabodka
- Occupations: Rabbi, Educator
- Spouse: Bessie (Basya) Preil
- Parent(s): Rabbi Avraham Binyamin and Shaina Sira Teitz

Rabbi Pinchas Mordechai Teitz (1908–1995) was an American rabbi, teacher, author, and innovator in creating a modern Torah community in Elizabeth, New Jersey. He excelled in his family's tradition of caring for Jews across the globe in any challenges they faced. A mikvah he built in 1938, a day school he founded in 1941 that grew to more than 900 students, adult education courses that he initiated, the welcome he gave to displaced persons after WWII and to Jews who came from Russia, all became a model for other leaders to implement in their cities and towns.

== Early life ==
Mordechai Pinchas Teitz was born on 8 Tammuz-July 7, 1908 in Subat, Latvia. The first name had a long history in the family, going back to Rav Mordechai Yoffe, the Levush. ‘Pinchas’ was the title of the parshah in the week of his bris. He became known by this name, which proved to be appropriate as he acted for the welfare of the Jewish community throughout his adult life. But he signed legal documents in Hebrew ‘Mordechai Pinchas,’ and his passport from Latvia read ‘Morduchas Pinchas Taic.’

His father's name also raised questions. At birth he was named Binyamin Yaakov, with Rabinovich as his last name. The family wanted to avoid his being taken into the Russian army. A boy who was an only child was exempt from the draft. The parents of an only son, Avraham Teitz, did not inform the authorities when their little boy died. They gave his passport to Binyamin Rabinovich, who now became Avraham Teitz, and was called ‘Avraham Binyamin’ or ‘Binyamin Avraham’ within the community. In his last years, when he did not have to fear that the Tsar's army would come after him, he signed letters with his original name, Binyamin Yaakov.

Another source of confusion was that Pinchas's grandfather was a Yoffe. But when he married Rivkah Rabinovich, he took on her surname because her family had become renowned. Her father, Rav Binyamin Rabinovich, was the courageous rabbi of Vilkomir who made a powerful man stop sending Jewish boys to the army. Her brothers were the twins Rav Eliyahu David and Rav Zvi Yehuda, who added ‘Te-omim’ to the family name. The initials of the first twin's name, aleph daled reish taf, formed an acrostic, ‘Aderet.’ His daughter married Rabbi Avraham Yitzchak Hakohen Kook, who later became the first chief rabbi in Palestine. When his wife died in the third year of their marriage, Rav Kook married her first cousin, and became doubly related to the Rabinoviches. For Pinchas's father, the youngest in the family and orphaned when he was nine, there was a special closeness with his uncles and their families; he lived with them when he was home from the yeshiva. He married Shaina Sira, a daughter of Rabbi Moshe Mishel Shmuel Shapiro, the rabbi of Rogova, Lithuania, and the author of noted scholarly works. Her ancestor was the Maharshal, Rav Shlomo Luria, known for his accurate rulings in Torah law. Her sister Leah married Rabbi Ben-Zion Zilber. Leah's son, Yitzchak Yosef, and Shaina Sira's son, Pinchas, first met in 1972 in Tashkent; two World Wars and the Iron Curtain had kept them apart until then.

Rabbi Binyamin Avraham Teitz was the rabbi in Subat for the mitnagdim and the hassidim. Living quarters for the family were between a shul for one group at one end, and for the other group at the second end. The five sons and five daughters learned that everyone was a valued member of the community, united with one rabbi. Years later visitors to Elizabeth commented that in most places the residents would erect separate synagogues for different factions, but Rabbi Teitz kept them united.

In 1914, Rabbi Eliyahu Akiva Rabinovich, a brother of Rabbi Binyamin Avraham, urged him to come with Shaina Sira and their children to Poltava, Russia, where he was the rabbi. The danger in Latvia was that the Russians and the Germans - whichever army reached a city first - took the rabbis as a hostage to prevent any aid being given to the enemy. Rabbi Eliyahu Akiva edited and published Hamodia, a newspaper, and HaPeles, a journal. Pinchas and his brothers set type on a machine their uncle had bought in Warsaw in order to print professional editions. The young Pinchas learned from his uncle to speak and write without fear about communal issues, and to act. If people were fleeing to Poltava, his uncle cared for them. Rabbi Eliyahu Akiva Rabinovich died before Passover in 1917, while he was preparing to bake matzoh for the refugees.

In 1921, the family had to flee again, this time from Communists who were intent on destroying Torah education and Torah life. In Latvia, their father became the rabbi in Livenhof. In the nearby city of Dvinsk were brilliant Torah scholars—Rabbi Yosef Rosen (the Rogatchover) and Rabbi Meir Simchah HaKohen, the author of Or Samei’ach and Meshekh Chokhmah. By the time Pinchas turned fourteen, he had met outstanding scholars and courageous, caring leaders, many of them his relatives. He learned from them how to be a rabbi.

== Education ==
Pinchas learned in a yeshiva in Ponevez, then in Riga. When he came home for vacation, he found that boys who were not in school were in danger. He was only fourteen and a half years old, yet he took the initiative and founded a heder for them.

He studied for six years at the yeshiva in Slabodka, where he and Rav Yaakov Kamenetsky began a life-long friendship. He was ordained in 1931 by Rabbi Yosef Zusman Hayerushalmi, Av Beis Din of Kovna, and by Rabbi Avraham Yitzchak Bloch, Rosh Yeshiva of Telz. His education in community-building began with an invitation from Rabbi Mordechai Dubin (1889–1956) to help in his successful campaign for a seat in the Latvian legislature, the Sejim. Dubin set the example of helping everyone, Gentile and Jew, observant and non-observant.

In 1931, when the doctor recommended that he spend time at home to recover from an emergency appendectomy, Pinchas took a daily train ride to Dvinsk to study Yoreh Deah, particularly the laws of kashrut, with Rabbi Yosef Rosen (the Rogatchover).

== Career ==
Rav Pinchas Teitz became friendly with Shimon Wittenberg, also a representative to the Sejim, and Avigdor Balshanek, the head of Agudath Israel in Latvia. He became Secretary of Agudath Israel and traveled around the country to establish a heder in every town. His powers of analysis, memorable phrasing, and ability to engender enthusiasm in an audience led to his being asked to speak at many gatherings. He met the Lubavitcher Rebbe (1880–1950) at the border when the Communists released him from Russia to Latvia; he helped the Rebbe establish a yeshiva in Riga. He met Rav Yehezkel Abramsky (1886–1976) at the train station in Riga when the Communists released him from prison. The prison officials had wanted to humiliate Rav Abramsky by removing his beard. Rav Teitz arranged a minyan in an apartment where the rav could stay while his beard grew back.

He edited Unzer Shtimme, "Our Voice," a Yiddish newspaper in Riga; he headed a religious youth movement that he named Yavneh; he was the rabbi of a small town.

At his sister's wedding the heads of the Telz Yeshiva observed his organizational skills and heard him speak. They asked him to accompany Rabbi Eliyahu Meir Bloch (1895–1955) on a fund-raising trip to North America. He promised his father that he would return to Latvia after the trip. He prepared by learning at the yeshiva for a semester.

Rabbi Bloch and Rabbi Teitz arrived in New York on November 3, 1933, the thirtieth day after the passing of Rabbi Elazar Mayer Preil, a distinguished Telz alumnus. He had been the rabbi of the Orthodox community in Elizabeth, New Jersey, a close friend of the Bloch family, the author of scholarly works, and had contributed essays under the pen name A.L. Tzihan to Hapeles, the journal Pinchas's uncle had edited and published in Poltava decades earlier.

=== Marriage ===
Rabbi Preil had written in his will that if the man his oldest daughter, Basya, would marry will be suitable, he should become the rabbi of Elizabeth. Basya and Pinchas hesitated to meet since people spoke about a solution to the problem of finding a rabbi, not about the relationship of a young couple. Then Rav Bloch introduced them to each other. In autumn 1934 they became engaged and on January 13, 1935, the 9th of Shvat, they married; she would teach her husband English.

=== Rescuing Jews from Europe ===
Their trip to Latvia and Lithuania to meet the family took them across Germany; fear of the Nazis was evident. Rabbi Teitz spoke wherever he was invited about the danger of Hitler carrying out his plans and the need to leave Europe. When the couple returned to America, he started the process of immigration for his family. He was able to save one brother and his parents. A brother-in-law came to the United States in 1938, then went back to accompany his wife and young children; they waited too long.

He had worked in Europe in the 1930s on an economic boycott of Germany, but the Nazis used it for propaganda against the Jews. Now that he was in the United States, he met with government officials, including senators, to propose paying $100 for each Jew who would be permitted to leave the lands that the Nazis had conquered. But anti-Semitism was rampant; one politician told him that helping Jews would hurt his chances in the next election. He joined Va’ad Hatzalah, sending food and trying to rescue people.

In 1941, Jewish life in Europe was being destroyed; Torah education and observance would have to grow in America. He started a day school where a high level of Jewish and secular knowledge would be attained. He instituted nursery for 3-year-olds, kindergarten at 4, and primer at 5, where children learned to read Hebrew and English, each one at an individual pace. He wanted children to enjoy learning through Shabbos parties, making a seder, singing, performances, and daily recess in a large playground. Opposition to a day school was intense; the word ‘yeshiva’ could not be used until Dr. Samuel Belkin, president of Yeshiva University from 1943 to 1975, made it part of the American vocabulary. The assumption was that only a big city with a large Jewish population could sustain a yeshiva. Elizabeth was the third small community to start a school.

After the war he went to England, France and D.P. (Displaced Persons) camps to help survivors find refuge. He listed the school and synagogues in Elizabeth as places where they could be employed. The savings account that contained money he had raised to construct a school building became assurance that none of the survivors would request welfare. In a booklet published by Bobover Hassidim they note that Rav Teitz helped the Rebbe with the paperwork and got him into the United States.

For 30 years he was the treasurer of Ezras Torah, a charity to support Torah scholars; he worked closely with Rabbi Yosef Eliyahu Henkin, who headed the charity. When a project to provide housing in Jerusalem for Torah scholars was about to go bankrupt, he raised the funds to complete it in 1977.

=== Building Torah in America ===
In 1947, he built a modern synagogue with perfect sight lines and acoustics for the men's and women's sections; it was located in a beautiful neighborhood, an example of the rabbi's principle that Orthodoxy should be first-rate in every way.

In 1951, he opened a new building for the school, around the corner from the synagogue; the school and synagogue were now named the Jewish Educational Center, JEC; visitors borrowed educational materials, mission statements, publicity flyers, and architectural plans.

In 1955, two projects combined: a yeshiva high school for boys opened; the classrooms were in a new synagogue in an area that had been fields a few years earlier, but was now the place to build spacious homes. The synagogue had 6 steps leading down to the men's section, and 6 steps up to the women's section, demonstrating that men and women shared in separating for prayer.

In 1963, he opened the Bruriah High School, the first yeshiva high school for girls in New Jersey.

In 1965, the boys’ high school moved into a new building with a beit midrash-study hall, labs, a gym, a library; it was connected to the elementary school building.

In 1972, Bruriah moved into a new building with a mikvah for the new neighborhood.

While he was fundraising and, together with his wife, creating a community where every member was important, he took responsibility for original projects:

In 1958–1964, he testified before congressional committees and state legislatures on the humane qualities of kosher slaughter; he debated on the radio with those who wanted to ban shechitah. For a book about the confrontation with death in America, Dr. Michael Lesy reported on the contrast between an ordinary packinghouse in Omaha, Nebraska and the kosher slaughterhouse that Rav Teitz permitted him to visit. He was impressed with the rabbi's explanation of shechitah and with the shochet's attitude to his work as a mitzvah. He thought "in Omaha, the kill was rational and brutal. Here it’s religious and humane."

In 1960, he served on the board of Yavneh, the newly formed National Association of Religious Jewish Students.

In 1961, he assisted students at Princeton in renting a house where they could pray, have Torah classes, and eat kosher food. He signed the lease for the house, spoke to officials at the university, invited Milton Levy, a member of the Elizabeth community who wanted to support this initiative (and who donated all the furniture and outfitted the kitchen), and gave several classes to the students.

=== Russia ===
Between 1964 and the 1980s, Rav Teitz traveled to the USSR twenty-two times to assure the 3 million Jews who were caught behind the Iron Curtain that their brothers and sisters cared for them, and to bring siddurim, chumashim, haggadot for Passover, etrogim and lulavim for Sukkot, and kosher cured meat. He published a siddur called Kol Yisrael Haverim, All Jews Are Friends, which contained all the information needed for a Jewish life: how to read Hebrew, how to pray, the text for a ketubah (marriage contract), how to make tefillin, mezuzot, and tzitzit. He added pictures of fruits, vegetables, grains, plants used for spices, with their names in Hebrew, Russian, and Latin/English (sometimes together, sometimes Latin alone), grouped together according to the blessing on each. Young people met in secret groups to learn from the siddurim how to read and speak Hebrew; several began to observe mitzvot. He met with government officials to stop the destruction of cemeteries and to get permits to build an ohel, a canopy, for the graves of such luminaries as Rabbi Chaim Ozer Grodzinski and the Vilna Gaon, and a gravestone for the Ba’al Shem Tov. His wife accompanied him on all the trips but two, when his daughters came instead. He wanted the insurance of American passports belonging to citizens born in America; his passport indicated that he was a naturalized citizen, and he did not want to be "reclaimed" by Latvia. He also wanted to demonstrate that they were tourists, not spies; a spy would not have his family accompany him.

He opposed demonstrations against the Soviet government; people criticized his approach of quietly applying for visas and repeatedly going to Russia. He did not want publicity; he did not speak about what he did on these trips. He was concerned that if the name of a person he worked with would become known, that person might be imprisoned.

After he died, and as Russia changed, emigrants started to tell what he had done. If a person wanted to leave Russia, he could take nothing along except for some clothing; everything of value was confiscated. Rav Teitz arranged with a family that was planning to exit: they would trade all their possessions for rubles; he would return the money to them in dollars when they got out. He gave the rubles to refuseniks who had been dismissed from their jobs, and to old people who were living in poverty, including a few talmidei hakhamim, Torah scholars, who were destitute. When the family reached the United States, he gave them dollars. They were able to start a business; within a few years, they bought a house.

Two men who were in the USSR appreciated what Rav Teitz was doing: Rav Eliyahu Essas, who led a return to Jewish education and observance in Russia, and now teaches Torah in Israel; Rav Yitzchak Zilber (1917–2004), who stood up for his beliefs in Tashkent, encouraged others to do the same, and became the "rabbi of the Russians" in Israel when he arrived there in 1972.

=== Daf Hashavua ===
In 1953, in order to awaken Jews who knew Yiddish, but had gotten distant from their origins, he founded a half-hour radio program of Talmud, Daf Hashavua, aired at 9:30 on Saturday night. He chose WEVD, a socialist station, to reach his intended audience. Over the years he taught 9 Tractates - Brakhot, Rosh Hashanah, Yoma, Sukkah and others that would be immediately relevant. The program continued until 1988. To meet the demand for texts each time he started a new tractate, he printed copies with line numbers so that listeners could easily find the place. He sent tapes for broadcasts in local stations to Boston, Chicago, Detroit, Miami, Philadelphia, and Montreal. Kol Yisrael LaGolah aired the tapes behind the Iron Curtain. When the U.S. government monitored foreign language programs, it reported 200,000 listeners. His son, Rabbi Elazar Mayer Teitz (1935-2025), taught Talmud on the radio in English for eleven years. There were objections from people who thought that Torah on the radio was forbidden. While David Eisenberg wrote in "She’arim" May 15, 1955 about "Limmud Torah Ba’rabim: Rive’vot Ma’azinim L’ Shiuro Shel HaRav Pinchas Mordechai Teitz," others were not positive. But Rabbi Yitzchak Herzog, Rabbi Shmuel Belkin, Rabbi Moshe Feinstein, Rabbi Yechiel Yaakov Weinberg and Rabbi Yosef Kahaneman, who spoke at the one-year celebration of the broadcast, all wrote in favor of teaching Torah through modern technology. In a taped message from Jerusalem to the celebration, Rav Herzog said perhaps this was the reason the radio was invented. Tapes of Rav Teitz's broadcasts demonstrated that here was another new technology that could be used to teach Torah; Torah Tapes were in the future.

== Publications ==
He joined the Machon Tzofnas Paneiah, to publish the works of Rabbi Yosef Rosen, the Rogatchover. When Rabbi Menachem Kasher died in 1983, he became the head of the group. For one volume, he added an analysis of reasons for this scholar's unusual ways, and an account of his insights. His mind was like a computer, containing the entire Written and Oral Torah; he was extraordinary in drawing connections. Meeting another great scholar in Dvinsk had two other benefits. When Rav Meir Simhah HaKohen told him that he had written the Meshekh Hokhmah, his commentary on the Bible, years earlier but now needed a young person to help him edit it, Pinchas, who was a student at Slabodka, found a student who worked with the rabbi to prepare the manuscript for publication. Fifty years later, Rav Teitz published a volume of responsa, She’ailot U’Tshuvot Or Samei’akh, and added a memorial list of the k’lei kodesh, those who served the religious needs of Latvian Jewry, giving their names, occupations, and where they had lived before the Holocaust.

Rabbi Teitz also raised the funds to publish Ma'lot ha-Torah that Rabbis Michel Feinstein and Nissan Waxman had edited.

=== Questions and Responsa ===
His correspondence with Rabbi Moshe Feinstein is well-known, particularly regarding 1. the question of bringing a seeing-eye dog into the synagogue, 2. the kashrut of whiskey aged in barrels that had been used to age non-kosher wines 3. does the recipient of a sefer that he did not request have an obligation to pay for it? 4. In retrieving books after the Holocaust, is there an obligation to restore them to their owners?

The question about learning Torah on the radio resulted in a number of articles in halakhic articles from 1953 on. Rabbi Yechiel Yaakov Weinberg settled the matter with his responsum on "Limmud HaTorah BaRabbim al Y’dei Ha’Radio."

He also wrote a number of pamphlets in Hebrew and Yiddish:

- ʻOrah! : a ruf tsu der Ameriḳaner orṭodoḳsi, Brooklyn, 1936.
- Mafteaḥ shel geʼulah, Elizabeth, 1948.
- Ḳonservaṭizm vuhin?, New York, 1953.

In 1953, together with Rabbi Simcha Elberg, he printed Rabbi Yechiel Yaakov Weinberg’s פנוי עצמות מתים, about the halakhic permissibility of moving the bones of dead people, an important halakhic concern after WWII. In the same year they published a pamphlet, מכתבי תורה, their correspondence on halakhic questions.

== Communal activity ==
=== Civil rights ===
On Sunday, August 25, 1963, a rally was held at the Polo Grounds to encourage participation in Martin Luther King Jr.’s March on Washington scheduled for Wednesday, August 28. Rabbi Teitz spoke about racial discrimination as a moral sin, as a wall that divides one part of America from the other. He hoped that the march would bring that wall down, just as the wall of Jericho had fallen. He envisioned a time when "we will emerge from this crisis unified and strengthened as one nation, under God, indivisible, with liberty and justice for all." The New York Times reported after the rally that among the representatives of major faiths, Rabbi Teitz spoke for the Union of Orthodox Rabbis.

=== Other communal activities ===
In June 1935, Rabbi Teitz spoke at a meeting of Agudath HaRabbanim - The Union of Orthodox Rabbis of the U.S. and Canada - about the need for rabbis to speak English if they wanted to communicate with the younger generation. His membership dues were returned to him for daring to criticize the older members. The group soon re-considered and appointed him Chairman of the Vaad Hapo’el. Twenty-one years later, he became a member of the Presidium together with Rabbi Eliezer Silver and Rabbi Dovid Lifshitz. He was dismayed by the insistence on criticizing other movements instead of creating positive programs and recruiting young members.

In 1981, he and Rabbi Yaakov Kamenetsky founded Merkaz HaRabbanim, a rabbinic group that would welcome young members and encourage them to serve the community as rabbis, teachers and other positions, rather than staying in a kollel with no time-limit. The major rabbinic/yeshiva leaders in Israel, Rabbi Elazar Menachem Man Shach and Rabbi Yaakov Yisrael Kanievsky sent letters of approval and encouragement to the new group. The young men ensconced in kollel had to get in touch with the world beyond the yeshiva walls. After three years, the Merkaz HaRabbanim closed; it was ahead of its time.

Two decades earlier, Rabbi Teitz wanted to start a movement for teshuvah, a return to Torah. He called it Takhlit, the first ‘T’ for tenu’ah, a movement, and the second ‘t’ for teshuvah. It did not catch on in 1963. But he was happy to see other groups in the following decades start beginner's minyanim, teach people to read Hebrew, help people turn their home kosher, and invite returnees for Shabbat meals.

He believed that leadership meant responsibility; it was not a popularity contest. It required creativity, not criticizing others.

Rabbi Teitz died on the 4th of Tevet 5756, December 26, 1995. His many children, grandchildren and great-grandchildren share his qualities of kindness and friendship, together with joy in life.

== See also ==
- Jewish Educational Center
- Rav Teitz Mesivta Academy
- Bruriah High School for Girls
