= Yaakov Schwei =

American rabbi (1934–2020)

Aharon Yaakov Schwei (July 9, 1934 – April 24, 2020) was an Orthodox rabbi and a member of the Chabad Hasidic movement. Rabbi Schwei served on the Bais Din Tzedek (Jewish Rabbinical Court) of the Chabad community in Crown Heights, Brooklyn.

== Rabbi of Crown Heights ==
As a member of the Crown Heights Beth Din (rabbinical court), Rabbi Schwei was one of the community's Marah D'Asra (Aramaic מרא דאתרא, a title equivalent to "Chief Rabbi"). The rabbinical court is the spiritual and religious body governing the Crown Heights Chabad community. After his death, three rabbis remained serving on the Beth Din:

- Rabbi Avraham Osdoba, the Av Beth Din (head of court).
- Rabbi Yosef Heller
- Rabbi Yosef Braun

Each hold the title Marah D'Asra.

=== Crown Heights Kashrus ===
Rabbi Schwei was involved in supervising and granting kosher certification under the Crown Heights rabbinical court. In recent years, Rabbi Osdoba's authority as sole administrator of the CHK was challenged by others in the community, including supporters of Rabbi Schwei and Rabbi Braun arguing that the arbitration panel (Zabl"a) ruled that it should be run by a board of directors "There is a need to create a new Vaad HaKashrus, which shall be the executive body of the Rabbis and the Vaad Hakohol. The court however remanded this ruling back to the arbitration panel for clarification which is yet to reconvene

=== Statement on local blogs ===
Both Rabbis Osdoba and Schwei spoke out against several "hate blogs" created by members of the community.

== Ordination ==
Rabbi Schwei received his rabbinic ordination from Rabbi Aryeh Leib Kramer, the former dean of the Chabad yeshiva in Montreal.

== Family ==
Yaakov Schwei's brother, Rabbi Isaac Schwei (1932–1988) was a rabbi in the Chabad community of Montreal (also ordained by Rabbi Aryeh Leib Kramer).

== Banning of Call of the Shofar ==
In December 2013, Rabbis Yaakov Schwei and Yosef Braun issued a letter stating that attending programs run by Call of the Shofar, a Jewish LGAT group based in Baltimore, is forbidden under Jewish law. They were later joined by the "Central Committee of Chabad-Lubavitch Rabbis in the United States and Canada," also known as Vaad Rabbonei Lubavitch who also banned COTS.

== Death ==
On April 24, 2020, Rabbi Schwei died in Brooklyn from complications associated with COVID-19.
