= Yalta (disambiguation) =

Yalta is a city in the Crimean peninsula.

Yalta may also refer to:

== Places ==
- Yalta, Donetsk Oblast, urban-type settlement in Pershotravnevyi Raion, Donetsk Oblast, Ukraine
- Yalta Hotel Complex, hotel in Yalta, Crimea

== Other uses ==
- Yalta Conference, of 1945, in which the UK, US and Soviet Union discussed Europe's reorganisation after the end of World War II
- Yalta, export version of the Zaporozhets car
- Yalta Rally, rally in Yalta, Crimea
- Yalta (Talmudic character), a character mentioned several times in the Babylonian Talmud

== See also ==
- Jalta, Jalta, a Croatian musical
