= Elazar Mayer Preil =

Lithuanian-born American rabbi

Rabbi Elazar Mayer Preil
- Born: 1878; Birz, Lithuania
- Died: October 4, 1933 (aged 54); Elizabeth, New Jersey
- Education: Lithuania: Telz, Slabodka
- Occupation(s): Rabbi, Educator
- Spouse: Frieda Mann
- Parent(s): Rabbi Elchonon and Hannah Gittel Preil

Rabbi Elazar Mayer Preil (1878 – October 4, 1933) was an American rabbi of Lithuanian origin. He served as a rabbi in Manchester, England, and in Trenton and Elizabeth, New Jersey, in the United States. He taught in the Rabbi Isaac Elchanan Theological Seminary, which later became Yeshiva University.

== Biography ==
Elazar Mayer Preil was born in 1878 in Birz, Kovna, to Rabbi Elchonon and Hannah Gittel Preil. He was the youngest in the family, with siblings who were already adults. One of his brothers, Rabbi Yehoshua Yosef Preil, was the rabbi of Kroki and a respected, brilliant thinker and writer. His sister Golda Miriam married Rabbi Avraham Nachman Schwartz, who served as rabbi in several cities and became the rabbi in Baltimore from 1908 until his death in 1937.

When he was two years old, his parents died. He grew up in a family of non-relatives who wanted him to join them in running their farm. Because he loved learning Torah, he went to Telshe Yeshiva, where the Bloch family took him in as one of the brothers. He was able to learn for a short while with his brother Yehoshua Yosef, who died in 1896. He learned in Telz and Slabodka. When Rabbi Yosef Leib Bloch opened a branch of Telz in Shadova, he invited Rav Preil to teach there. He also worked as a pharmacist and photographer. In 1899 he married Miriam, a relative of Rabbi Chaim of Volozhin. After more than ten years of marriage, she died in childbirth.

In 1907 he went to London on behalf of Telz. The Jewish community in Manchester invited him to be the rabbi of their United Synagogue and Beit Hamedrash. He served until 1911, when he emigrated to the United States. After a short stay in Brooklyn, he became the rabbi of Trenton, New Jersey. In 1912, Rabbi Bernard Revel, a Telz alumnus, asked him to teach at the Rabbi Isaac Elchanan Theological Seminary. He was chosen to be the rabbi of Elizabeth, NJ in 1919. Five years later, when the community wanted a full-time rabbi, he gave up teaching at the yeshiva.

He was the secretary, then vice-president, of the Union of Orthodox Rabbis of the United States and Canada, where he served as chairman of the board of education, then the board of kashrut. He was a founder of Ezras Torah, and a director of World Jewish Relief, Rabbi Isaac Elchanan Theological Seminary, and the Yeshiva of New Haven, Connecticut.

In 1914 he married Frieda Mann in New York City. Their daughter Basya and her husband, Rabbi Pinchas Mordechai Teitz, who became the rabbi of Elizabeth in accordance with Rabbi Preil’s will, founded the Jewish Educational Center. Their second daughter, Hannah Gittel, married Rabbi Pesach Raymon, who became the rabbi of New Brunswick, then Highland Park and Edison, NJ; he founded the Moriah yeshiva, which is now named Rabbi Pesach Raymon Yeshiva in his honor. David Abramson, the son of their daughter Sarah, is a professor at NYU’s College of Global Health, and the founding director of NYU’s program of population impact, recovery and resilience. Their son, Rabbi Dr. Joseph J. Preil, headed the Board of Jewish Education in New York, was a professor at Kean University where he instituted Holocaust Studies for the state of New Jersey, and edited Holocaust Testimonies: European Survivors and American Liberators in New Jersey.

Rabbi Preil founded two Jewish day schools, one in 1920, the second in 1930. The first one lasted three years, the second four years, ending in June 1934, nine months after his death.

He wrote The Handbook for Jewish Women in 1920. He contributed essays and responses to HaMaor, Hamodia, Hapardes, HaPeles, Migdal Torah, Ohel Torah, Shaarei Zion, and Yagdil Torah. In 1924 he published K’Savim Nivcharim of his brother, Rabbi Yehoshua Yosef, who died twenty-eight years earlier. In 1929 he published the first volume of Hama’or, on Halakhah and Aggadah. His son-in-law, Rabbi Teitz, and grandson, Rabbi Elazar Mayer Teitz, published the second volume in 1955. In 2008, his grandson Rabbi Yaakov Zvi Preil edited Torah novellae in Halakhah and Aggadah in correspondence between Rabbi Preil and his brother-in-law, Rabbi Avraham Nachman Schwartz, and published them in Binat Z’keinim.

Rabbi Preil died on Erev Sukkot, October 4, 1933.
