= FVG =

FVG may refer to:

- Faculty for Comparative Religion (Dutch: Faculteit voor Vergelijkende Godsdienstwetenschappen), in Belgium
- Ferrovías Guatemala, a Guatemalan rail operator
- Free-minded Union, a German political party in 1893–1910 (German: Freisinnige Vereinigung; FVg)
- Friuli-Venezia Giulia, a region of Italy
- VG Airlines, a defunct Belgian airline
