= Ahron Daum =

Israeli-born Modern-Orthodox rabbi

Rabbi Ahron Daum
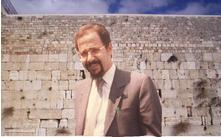
- Rabbi Ahron Daum in front of the Kotel.
- Born: Ahron Daum; 6 January 1951; Bnei Brak, Israel
- Died: 27 June 2018 (aged 67)
- Occupations: Rabbi, professor, author, educator
- Years active: 1982–2018
- Spouse: Francine
- Children: 3
- Website: www.bestjewishstudies.com

Ahron Daum (Hebrew: אהרן דאום; January 6, 1951 – June 27, 2018) was an Israeli-born Modern-Orthodox rabbi, educator, author, and former chief rabbi of Frankfurt am Main from 1987 to 1993. From 1995 until his death in 2018, he was a lecturer at the Faculty for Comparative Religion in Antwerp, Belgium.

== Personal life and education ==
Ahron Daum was born on January 6, 1951, in Bnei Brak, Israel. He was born into a religious Ashkenazi family. His father Schmuel Daum was an important educator, writer, and communal figure, hailing from a prominent rabbinic family from Poland and Bohemia. His mother Rivka Gina Daum hailed from a prosperous trader family in Sopron, Hungary. He has three younger brothers. His intensive religious training began at age 13 in the famous Lithuanian-Chassidic “Ruzhin” Yeshiva in Bnei Brak. At age 14, he left for the UK where he continued his studies at the Yeshiva Ha-Rama and later on moved to the well-known Zionistic Yeshiva Etz Chaim in Montreux, Switzerland. In 1975, after obtaining his Baccalaureate Degree in Switzerland, he went to Jews’ College, University of London, where he obtained a bachelor's degree in Jewish Studies (with Honours). From 1978 he attended the Rabbi Isaac Elchanan Theological Seminary (RIETS '82) of Yeshiva University, New York City where he obtained a master's degree in Biblical Studies (with Honours) and his rabbinical ordination personally signed and handed by Rabbi Joseph Soloveitchik. Declining the offer to continue his studies in order to obtain the title of Dayan, he returned to Europe where he married Francine Frenkel with whom he has three daughters. He speaks Hebrew, English, German, French, Dutch and Yiddish and has a passive knowledge of Aramaic and Latin.

== Rabbinical career ==
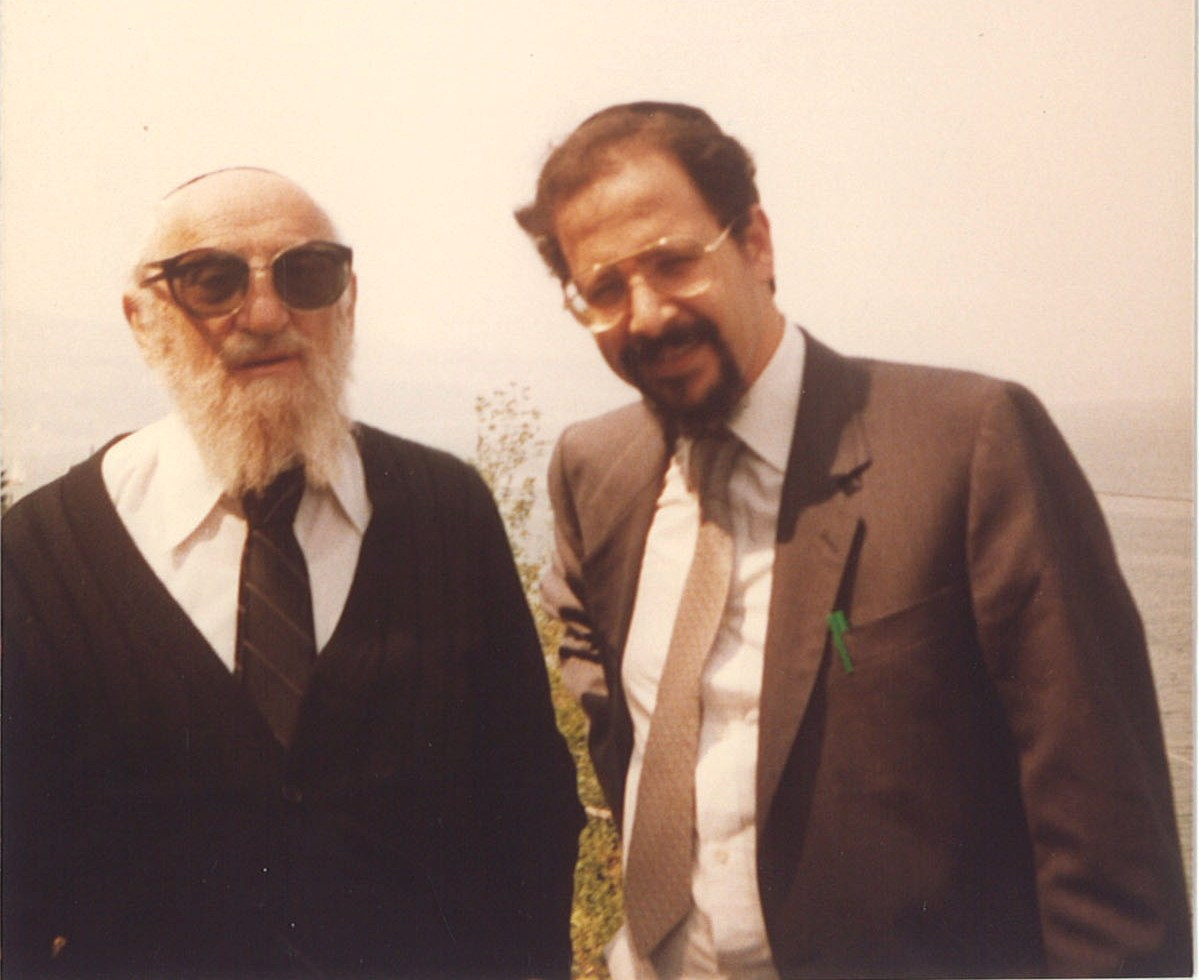
Rabbi Ahron Daum (right) together with Rabbi Simcha Elberg (left)

In 1982 he started his rabbinical career in Switzerland as a community Rabbi in the town of Biel, a bilingual French/German town. He left this post in 1986 to become a doctoral fellow at the Christlich-Jüdische Institut in Lucerne, affiliated with the Theological Faculty of the University of Lucerne, Switzerland. In 1987 he accepted the post of Chief Rabbi of the Jewish Community of Frankfurt am Main, Germany, which at the time was home to the largest Jewish Community of West Germany. During his tenure Germany received a great wave of Russian-Jewish immigrants from streaming from the former Soviet Union. Daum's task was to aid these new arrivals – who had often been detached from their Jewish roots for over 90 years – to integrate them into the Jewish Community. This often proved to be very complex, as in the Soviet Union little to no effort had been done to strengthen their Jewish identity. One of Daum's first tasks as community Rabbi in Frankfurt am Main was to resolve the challenging problem of clarifying the Jewish status of the newcomers.

Daum was the driving force in the community regarding religious and cultural activities, not only but especially for the new members of the Jewish Community hailing from the Former Soviet Union. He organized Jewish culture days featuring e.g. Jewish Klezmer music and speakers specializing in the field of religious outreach, adapted to the needs of the new community members from the Former Soviet Union, and heritage tours to places of immense Jewish historical value, cities such as Worms, Mainz, and Michelstadt.

During his 5 years time in office as Rabbi of the community in Frankfurt, Rabbi Ahron Daum was the sole acting Rabbi. He fulfilled the full scope of tasks for the community in Frankfurt, which at that time counted approximately 6000-7000 people. He pulled the strings for all services on Shabbat and festivals, including sermons dealing with contemporary issues. Besides giving regular Torah lessons on Shabbat and weekdays to the members of the community, he regularly visited the four existing synagogues and additionally paid regular visits to the two existing Jewish old-age homes on the occasion of the High Holidays, Chanukkah and Pesach. He regularly took part in funerals and made Shive visits, regardless of the status of the deceased member; known or unknown, rich or poor. He had been supervising the Kashrut of the community institutions, such as the restaurants, the butcher shops, kosher meals for Lufthansa and occasional celebrations, like Bar-/Bat Mitzvahs and marriages in big hotels. Additionally it had been very important for Rabbi Daum to instigate the renovation of the Mikvah according to the high standards of the Halacha. With the support of Rabbi Meir Posen, at that time the greatest Halachical authority on the construction of Mikvahs in Europe, he ensured that the high Halachical standards and the Kashrut of the Mikvah in Frankfurt would be met. Leading not only the yearly communal Passover Seders with several hundred participants, he also organized a community Sukkah for the community members and frequently invited community members to his Shabbat table, not distinguishing between members from the center or the periphery of the community. Together with this father, Shmuel Daum, he regularly organized Kabbalat Shabbat youth-Minyanim in the Baumweg Synagogue and during his time in office he had also been the Av Beth Din of Frankfurt. As such he actively dealt with Giyurim, questions concerning Kashrut, Dinei Torah and religious divorces (Gittin). Regarding Giyurim Rabbi Daum has the experience from both the perspective of a religious Rabbinical judge (Beth Din), as well as a teacher and mentor. He embodies over 15 years of experience preparing non-Jews who wish to become Jewish for their Halachic recognized Giyur.

In 1993, for family reasons, he resigned from his post as Chief Rabbi and moved to Antwerp, Belgium, where the largest part of his family already lived. There he started to teach Judaism within the state school system and in Jewish day schools. In 1995 he accepted a position as lecturer in Jewish Law at the Faculty for Comparative Religion in Wilrijk (Antwerp), Belgium. In recognition of his teaching there and his works on Halacha the Faculty awarded him a Professorship Honoris Causa in Jewish Law. Since 2001 he also started, along with his wife, a series of outreach projects for Baalei Tshuva, non-Jews interested in Jewish studies and prospective converts to Judaism. Today this takes up most of his time and efforts and as part of these outreach activities he regularly organizes, in cooperation with the Netherlands-based Shalom Centre, study days on various topics within the field of Jewish studies.

== Work and publications ==
Rabbi Ahron Daum was a prolific author who has written on a diverse scope of topics within the field of Jewish studies. Whilst living in Switzerland he was a regular contributor of Halachic articles to the Jewish Swiss-German weekly "Jüdische Rundschau". During his tenure as Chief Rabbi of Frankfurt am Main, he regularly wrote articles for "Die Jüdische Allgemeine" and the bi-monthly magazine "Die Gemeinde". Since 2010 he wrote a monthly column for the magazine Joods Actueel, the most widely circulated Jewish publication in Belgium. In those columns he coverEd the whole spectrum of Jewish Studies, for example his well-liked series on the history of Judaism since the Enlightenment. He was the author of two books. His first book "Halacha aktuell" is a two-volume work, written in German, which treats Halachic problems and issues of current interest as they appear in the Halachic literature and more specifically the Responsa. This work is unique in that it was the first book written in German during the post-war period that comprehensively deals with Halachic issues in the Responsa literature. It was therefore welcomed with great enthusiasm in the Halachic world and received approbations from many distinguished Halachic authorities. Certain articles from this book were written in Rabbinic Hebrew and were later separately published under the title "Iyunim b’Halacha". His second book was "Die Jüdische Feiertage in Sicht der Tradition" (The Jewish Festivals in View of the Tradition). It is a two-volume anthology combining Halachic articles, sermons, liturgical remarks, homiletic thoughts and folkloric and humorous tales connected to the Jewish holidays and Shabbat. He is presently working on a number of books in Dutch covering such diverse topics as Kabbalah, Jewish History, the contemporary Jewish World and its different affiliations and other issues.

== Published works ==
Books

- Halacha aktuell, Jüdische Religionsgestze und Bräuche im modernen Alltag (Haag und Herchen Verlag, Frankfurt am Main, 1992, 2 Vol., p. 387 – p. 773)
- Iyunim b’Halacha (Haag und Herchen Verlag, Frankfurt am Main, 1992, p. 93)
- Die Feiertage Israels, Die jüdischen Feiertage in er Sicht der Tradition (Herchen Verlag, Frankfurt am Main, vol. I, 1993, p. 556, vol. II, 1994, p. 557)
- "Das aschkenasische Rabbinat : Studien über Glaube und Schicksal" (Julius Carlebach) / Die Rolle des Rabbiners in Deutschland heute (Ahron Daum)
