= Call of the Shofar =

Organization focusing on personal and relational transformation

- Founder: Steven "Simcha" Frischling
- Headquarters: Baltimore, MD, US

Call of the Shofar was an organization based in Baltimore, US, focusing on personal and relational transformation. Call of the Shofar offers workshops assisting individuals to enhance their personal relationships. The organization's director is Steven (Simcha) Frischling.

Some have termed Call of the Shofar programs "cultlike". Call of the Shofar members have voiced their contention to these designations.

== Activities ==
=== Programs ===
Call of the Shofar leads experiential workshops, follow-up groups, teleconferences and private coaching.

=== Workshops ===
The "Seasons of Transformation" workshop is a 3-day residential event, usually held over a weekend starting Friday morning until Sunday evening including Shabbos.

== Locations ==
Call of the Shofar frequently weekend workshops in Baltimore, Maryland; Morristown, New Jersey, and Israel. Other previous locations include Milwaukee, Wisconsin; Toronto, Ontario, Canada, and Los Angeles, California.

Follow-up groups are regularly held in Baltimore, Maryland; Silver Spring, Maryland; Brooklyn, New York; Monsey, New York; Milwaukee, Wisconsin; Toronto, Ontario, Canada; Los Angeles, California and Jerusalem, Israel.

== Reception ==
Although the organization had been in operation for several years, Call of the Shofar had received little media attention up until December 2013. Following the publication of an interview with Frischling, the program received extensive coverage on news blogs and social media. Reviews of the program were mixed. The Call of the Shofar director publicly responded to the allegation posed by many rabbis and professional therapists that his program was a cult.

=== In the Jewish community ===
Call of the Shofar received several favorable reviews from members of the general Jewish community, and received letters of support by several Jewish psychologists.

=== In the Chabad community ===
The program has received mixed to unfavorable reviews from the Chabad community. Rabbi Shea Hecht has originally dubbed the program a "kosher cult" (also a "parve cult"). Rabbis Yaakov Schwei and Yosef Braun of the Crown Heights Beis Din declared that attending programs run by the organization is forbidden under Jewish law. They were joined by the Vaad Rabbonei Lubavitch.

While several Chabad rabbis denounced Call of the Shofar, others defended the desire of the program's attendees for seeking spiritual growth. The existing rabbinical approbations supporting Call of the Shofar were called into question by some within the Chabad community, while individual Chabad members have also spoken out in the organization's favor.

Rabbi Raphael Aron, Director of Cult Consulting Australia, released a 46-page report on the practices, beliefs and leadership of the organization.

=== Call of the Shofar response ===
In an interview with the Baltimore Jewish Times, Frischling claimed to be an ordained rabbi and denied the charges of being a cult leader. Frischling stated that his organization has rabbinical approbations from Rabbi Yaacov Hopfer, of Baltimore's Congregation Shearith Israel, Rabbi Michel Twerski of Milwaukee, Wisconsin and Rabbi Shmuel Kamenetsky of Philadelphia. Kamenetzky's approbation was withdrawn following the unfavorable reviews by rabbis in the Chabad community. An additional approbation was added from Rabbi Yitzchak Breitowitz, of Yeshivas Ohr Sameach, Jerusalem, Israel.

An official statement by Friscling was published in the Call of the Shofar website stating that Call of the Shofar programs comply with Jewish law.

In an interview with The Jewish Week, Frischling described his workshops as "profoundly positive".
