= Sukhbir Singh Kapoor =

Indian writer

Sukhbir Singh Kapoor OBE
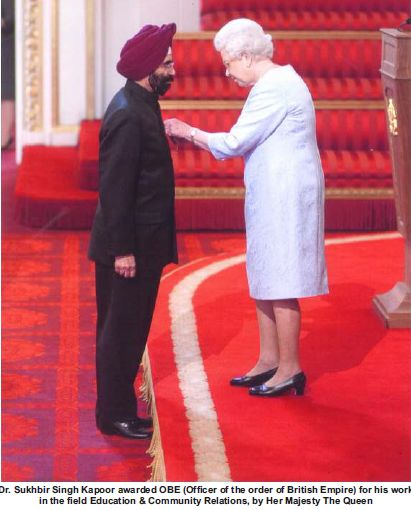
- Kapoor being awarded OBE by Queen Elizabeth II
- Born: November 21, 1935 (age 89); Amritsar, India
- Education: D.Litt., PhD, M.A. (law), MComm, BComm (hons), LL.B., FCCA, FCMA, CGMA
- Occupation(s): Vice chancellor, World Sikh University London
- Spouse: Mohinder Kaur
- Children: 2

Sukhbir Singh Kapoor OBE (Punjabi: ਸੁਖਬੀਰ ਸਿੰਘ ਕਪੂਰ) was a writer, educator and currently the vice chancellor of The International School of Sikh Studies and Khalsa College. Kapoor has served as a professor and administrator at universities in several countries. He has written 50 books on various topics, including Sikhism, economic theory, business administration, accounting practice, and Punjabi poetry. His numerous articles have appeared in many English and Punjabi magazines, and he has received numerous awards, including the Punjabi Academy Award from the Government of Delhi. He has also organized many symposia for drama and poetry, and has directed many plays. Kapoor is the chief editor of the Sikh Courier International. Kapoor was appointed Officer of the Order of the British Empire (OBE) in the 2010 Birthday Honors.

== Education ==
He studied at the Universities of Punjab, Agra, Glasgow, and London. His academic and professional achievements include qualifications of D.Litt., PhD, MCom, M.A. (law), BCom (hons), LL.B., FCMA, and FCCA. He received military training as a cadet at Kamti for NCC, where he was commissioned as an officer.

== Early career ==
In his early career, he was professor and head of accounting at Sri Guru Tech Bahadur Khalsa College Delhi, University of Delhi, and principal lecturer in accounting at London Guildhall University. Later, he became a guest professor of Sikhism at the Faculty for Comparative Religion in Antwerp, Belgium.

== Later career ==
Kapoor is currently vice chancellor of The International School of Sikh Studies and Khalsa College London.

== Books ==
All books written by Kapoor are in English. Guru-bani text, where relevant, is both in Punjabi and English.

Year	Title	ISBN	Notes
2013	Japji - A way of God Realisation (Fourth edition)		
2013	Rehrassa & Kirtan Sohila- to torch to pass through the darkness of death (Second edition)	81-207-1527-6	
2012	Epistles & Signets: Letters written, signs and seals of the Sikh Gurus	9788170103905	
2011	Guru Granth Sahib: An Empirical Study, Volume 1	9788170103868	
2011	Guru Granth Sahib - An Insight into the Format and Design of Guru Granth Sahib		Co-authored by Mohinder Kaur Kapoor
2011	Sikh Law Book (Second edition)	81-7010-328-2	
2011	Islam, An Introductory Study (Second edition)		
2011	Sikh Religion and the Sikh People (Sixth edition)	81-7010-230-8	
2010	Islam: An Introductory Study (Second Edition)		
2010	Guru Granth Sahib: An Introductory Study (Fourth Edition)		
2009	Hinduism – An Introductory study (Second edition)		
2009	Comparative Studies of World Religions (Fourth edition)		
2008	The Anglo Sikh Wars	81-7601-945-3	Co-authored by Mohinder Kaur Kapoor
2008	The Making of the Sikh Rehatnamas	978-81-7010-370-7	Co-authored by Mohinder Kaur Kapoor
2008	The Crowning Glory of Guru Granth Sahib	9788176019408	
2008	The Sloaks of Guru Tegh Bahadur	978-81-7010-371-4	
2008	The Last Rites – A Comparative Study of the last rites of different religions	978-81-7010-369-1	
2007	A Dynamic Look into Sukhmani Sahib		
2006	The Birds and Guru Granth Sahib	81-7601-772-8	
2005	The Sikh Ideology	81-7601-729-9	
2005	Janam Sakhi Parampara	81-7601-700-0	
2005	Hinduism – An Introductory Study	81-7010-354-1	
2004	The Sikh Law Book - The Law Personally Handed by God to Guru Nanak	81-7010-328-2	
2004	Guru Granth Sahib – An Insight into its Format and Design	81-7010-335-5	
2004	Islam – An Introduction	81-7010-341-X	
2004	Sui Generis Martyrdom – Martyrdom of Mata Gujri and Sahibzadas	81-7010-344-4	
2004	Sikhism – Guru Granth Sahib and The Sikh History	81-7601-670-5	
2003	Guru Granth Sahib – An Advance Study Volume 2 (2007 edition)	81-7010-321-5	
2003	Dasam Granth – An Introductory Study	81-7010-325-8	
2003	Comparative Studies of World Religions (Second edition)	81-7601-790-6	
2003	Asa di Var – an Epic the Listening of Which Fulfills All Worldly Desires	81-207-2653-7	
2002	Guru Granth Sahib – An Advance Study Volume 1 (2006 edition)	81-7010-317-7	
2002	Sikh Religion and the Sikh People (Fifth revised edition 2007)	81-7010-230-8	
2002	Sikhism – An Introduction (Second revised and enlarged edition)	9788170102885	
2002	Japji – A Way of God Realisation (Third edition)		Co-authored by Mohinder Kaur Kapoor
2001	Sikhism – 1000 Questions Answered	81-7010-310-X	
2001	Guru Granth Sahib, An Introductory Study (enlarged edition)	81-7010-293-6	
2001	Sikh Philosophy, Facts and Fundamentals of Sikh Religion (Second edition)	81-7010-239-1	
2001	Japjee – The Sikh Morning Prayer (Illustrated deluxe edition)	81-7002-078-6	
2000	Bhagat Bani	81-7010-300-2	
2000	Sikh Religion and the Sikh People (Second edition)		
1999	Sikhism – An Introduction	81-7601-795-7	
1999	Saint Soldier (The Khalsa Brotherhood)	81-7010-285-5	
1999	Comparative Studies of World Religions	81-7601-790-6	
1999	The Creation of Khalsa (Edited)	81-7010-294-4	
1999	Japji, A Way of God Realisation (Second edition)		
1997	Guru Angad Dev, Life, History and Teachings		
1997	Nitnem (The Daily Sikh Prayers) (Translation in both easy Panjabi and English)	81-7010-272-3	
1997	Khushi de Hanju (Panjabi poetry)		
1996	The Sikh Marriage Ceremony (Anand Marriage)		
1996	Baramah (The Twelve Months)		
1995	Kirtan Sohila and Ardas		
1995	Gurbani – God's Word	81-7010-246-4	
1995	Jap Sahib, Swayas and Ardas, Master compositions of Guru Gobind Singh Ji (Translation followed by relevant Sakhis (life stories))	81-207-1622-1	
1995	Janoon (Panjabi poetry)		
1993	Rehras & Kirtan Sohila (Translation followed by relevant Sakhis (life stories))	81-207-1527-6	
1993	Sikh Philosophy, Facts and Fundamentals of Sikhism (First edition)		
1993	Puniya da chand (Panjabi poetry)		
1991	Japji (First edition)		
1991	Sikh Religion and the Sikh People (First edition)		
1990	Being a Sikh	81-7010-202-2	
1987	Ideal Man, Guru Gobind Singh's Concept of a Saint Soldier		
1984	Invasion of Golden Temple		
1983	Sikh Festivals		
1982	Sikhs & Sikhism		
