= RTMA =

RTMA may refer to:

- Radio Television Manufacturers Association, a US electronics association between 1950 and 1953, successor to RMA and predecessor to EIA
- Rav Teitz Mesivta Academym a Yeshiva high school in New Jersey, USA since 1955
