= Alfi Kabiljo =

Croatian composer and musician (1935–2025)

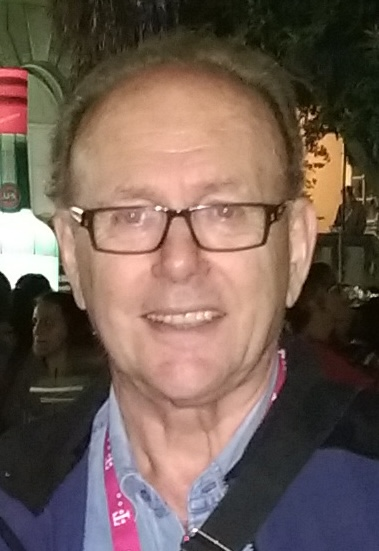
- Kabiljo in 2014

Background information
- Born: Alfons Kabiljo; 22 December 1935; Zagreb, Kingdom of Yugoslavia (now Croatia)
- Died: 1 April 2025 (aged 89) Zagreb, Croatia
- Occupation(s): Composer, musician
- Website: https://alfi-kabiljo.com/

Alfons "Alfi" Kabiljo (Croatian pronunciation: [âlfi kabǐːʎo]; 22 December 1935 – 1 April 2025) was a Croatian composer and musician. He was composing for over 60 years. During that time he created an opus of more than 40 film and more than 100 episode soundtracks, eleven musicals, two musical films and two ballets. His musicals have been performed over 2000 times.

== Life and career ==
Kabiljo was taught music by the Croatian composer Rudolf Matz and later enrolled the Vatroslav Lisinski music school. Roger Samyn helped him brush up his composing skills. Although he received a degree on the Faculty of Architecture of the University of Zagreb, Kabiljo never made use of it. He has spent most of his life in the Zagreb neighborhood of Šalata, although he stayed in Paris for a short while. Kabiljo was a president of the Croatian Composers' Society (Croatian: Hrvatsko društvo skladatelja) and a member of the FIDOF organization.

Alfi wrote his first song when he was eight years old.

Later, he wrote soundtracks for various films, including the 1991 film Scissors, starring Sharon Stone and Ronny Cox, and the 1986 film The Girl. He also wrote soundtracks for over 100 television episodes, including the Croatian TV mini-series Ljubav ili smrt, based on a novel by Ivan Kušan, the TV series Ne daj se Floki, and series about the famous inventor Nikola Tesla.

His songs have been sung by award-winning singers such as Ivo Robić and Tereza Kesovija. Kabiljo is the author of one of the greatest Croatian patriotic songs, Tvoja zemlja, which was performed by Vice Vukov.

Kabiljo's best-selling and best known work is the musical Jalta, Jalta, for which he received the 2004 Porin award for the magnum opus. To date, the musical has been released in audio format three times and it had its first premiere in 1971. All three releases were sold out decades ago.

Kabiljo died on 1 April 2025, at the age of 89.
