= Komedija Theatre =

Croatian theater

Theatre Komedija
- Zagrebačko gradsko kazalište "Komedija"
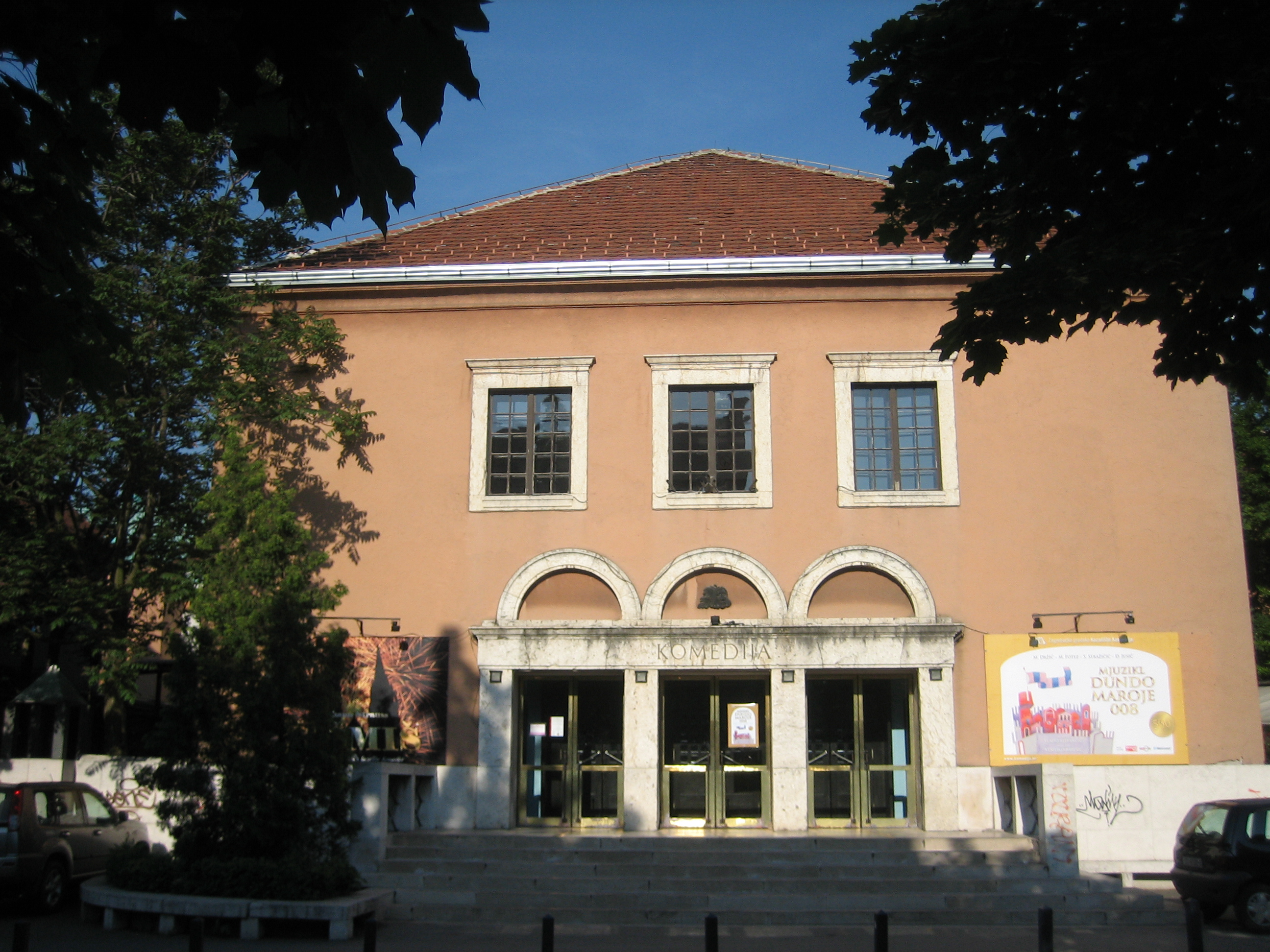
- Theatre building
- Interactive map of Theatre Komedija
- Address: Kaptol ul. 9 Zagreb; Croatia
- Coordinates: 45.8160595°N 15.9780737°E
- Capacity: 442
- Production: TBC

Construction
- Opened: 1 November 1950; 75 years ago
- Years active: 1950 – present

Website
- (Official Website)

Komedija Theatre (Croatian: Zagrebačko gradsko kazalište "Komedija") is a theatre in Zagreb, Croatia which specializes in musicals. It was opened in 1950 as a legal successor to the Zagreb Drama Theatre and the Vedri Kerempuh Theatre. Notable pieces that premiered there include the 1971 musical Jalta, Jalta and the first Croatian rock opera Gubec-beg (1981).

== History ==
The theater was opened on November 1, 1950 as a merger of two previous theaters and is situated in a building on Kaptol street in the old city centre of Zagreb.
