= Yosef Yeshaya Braun =

Orthodox Chabad Hasidic Rabbi

Rabbi Yosef Yeshaya Braun

Personal life
- Known for: Member of the Beth Din of Crown Heights
- Occupation: Rabbi

Religious life
- Religion: Judaism
- Denomination: Orthodox
- Movement: Chabad-Lubavitch

Rabbi Yosef Yeshaya Braun is an Orthodox rabbi and a member of the Chabad Hasidic movement. Rabbi Braun serves as a member of the Beth Din of Crown Heights, the Bais Din Tzedek (Jewish Rabbinical Court) of the Jewish community in Crown Heights, Brooklyn; he is an authority on Halacha (Jewish law) and Hasidic philosophy. Rabbi Braun previously served as the rabbi of the Tzemach Tzedek Synagogue in Sydney, Australia.

== Rabbi of Crown Heights ==
As a member of the Crown Heights Beis Din (rabbinical court), Rabbi Braun one of the community's Marah D'Asra (Aramaic מרא דאתרא, a title equivalent to "Chief Rabbi"). The rabbinical court is the spiritual and religious body governing the Crown Heights Jewish community. There are currently three rabbis serving on the Beth Din:

- Rabbi Avraham Osdoba
- Rabbi Yosef Heller (Emeritus, as he has recused himself from all communal affairs)
- Rabbi Yosef Yeshaya Braun

Each member of the court holds the title Marah D'Asra.

The Crown Heights rabbinical court is funded by the Crown Heights Jewish Community Council (CHJCC), a religious corporation representing the Jewish community of Crown Heights.

=== Appointment ===
Rabbi Braun was elected in a community wide election. He ran against Moshe Bogomilsky. Braun won the election with over 50 percent of the vote to Bogomilsky's 45 percent, a third candidate received the rest. Rabbi Braun's appointment was also affirmed by an independent arbitration panel (Zabl"a Bais Din). as well as secular court.

== Banning of Call of the Shofar ==
In December 2013, Rabbis Yosef Braun and Yaakov Schwei issued a letter stating that attending programs run by Call of the Shofar, a Jewish LGAT group based in Baltimore, is forbidden under Jewish law. They were later joined by the "Central Committee of Chabad-Lubavitch Rabbis in the United States and Canada," also known as Vaad Rabbonei Lubavitch who also banned COTS

== Controversies ==
Following his election to the Crown Heights Beth Din, a number of controversial incidents occurred, involving Rabbi Braun and other members of the Beth Din.

=== Eligibility as community rabbi ===
Several rabbis associated with Rabbi Osdoba have stated that Rabbi Braun is not qualified to serve as a community rabbi. Rabbi Braun's rabbinical ordination has also come under scrutiny; some have questioned the legitimacy of his ordination., however after reviewing objection brought by Rabbi Osdoba, the arbitration panel (Zabl"a) ruled that Rabbi Braun's rabbinic ordination is valid, stating "The semicha is a kosher semicha, it is not forged. Therefore this remains an absolute semicha... In light of the above, it is clear that Rabbi Yosef Shaya Braun shlita was elected in accordance with halacha. The entire public must honor him and all the other rabbis of the community must cooperate with him, etc., etc." This ruling was later upheld in secular court, stating: the Rosenberg Beth Din rejected, over Rabbi Osdoba's objection, all challenges to Rabbi Braun's qualifications, finding that Rabbi Braun had been properly ordained... The Rosenberg Beth Din further rejected related challenges to Rabbi Braun's qualifications.

=== Challenge over the CHK ===
Some supporters of Rabbi Braun challenged Rabbi Osdoba over his privatization of the Crown Heights Kashrus (CHK), a kosher certification, arguing that the arbitration panel (Zabl"a) ruled that it should be run by a board of directors "There is a need to create a new Vaad HaKashrus, which shall be the executive body of the Rabbis and the Vaad Hakohol." The court however remanded this ruling back to the arbitration panel for clarification which is yet to reconvene

In July 2019 Rabbis Osdoba, Schwei and Braun settled their differences and reunited as one Beth Din with one Kashrut agency.
