= Simcha Elberg =

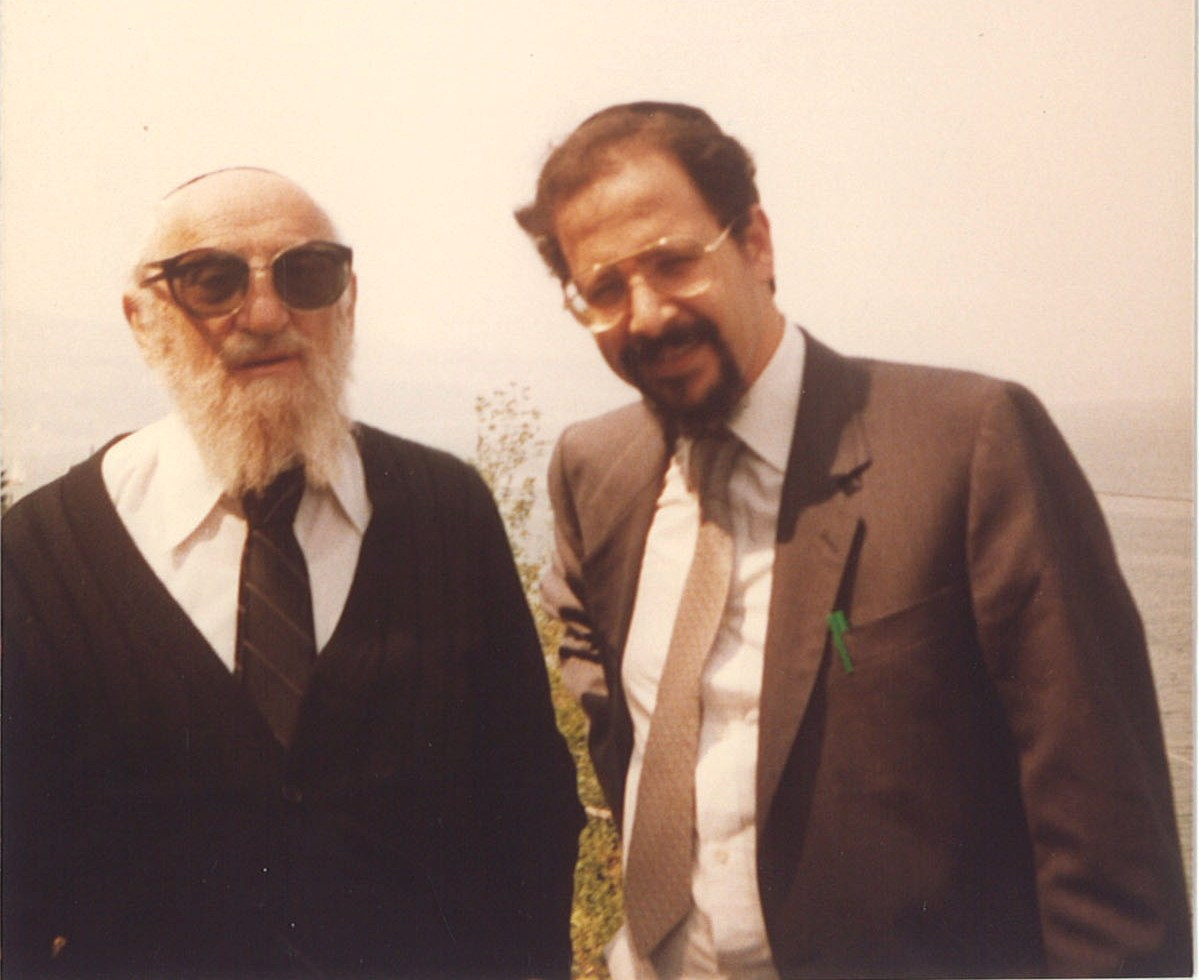
Rabbi Simcha Elberg (left) together with Rabbi Ahron Daum

Rabbi Simcha Elberg (known as שמחה עלבערג in Hebrew) (1915–1995) was a renowned Talmudic scholar and the chairman on the executive board of the Union of Orthodox Rabbis for 25 years. He was also on the executive committee of Agudath Israel of America.

== Biography ==
Rabbi Elberg was born in Poland and ordained as a Rabbi in Warsaw by Rabbi Menachem Ziemba. He studied at Warsaw's Emek Halacha Yeshiva, where his main teacher was Rabbi Natan Spigelglas. He edited the yeshivah's journal, as a means to combat Haskalah, or Enlightenment. He went to the Montreaux yeshivah between 1935 and 1936 and then moved to Paris as a correspondent for the orthodox press. He enrolled at the Sorbonne, but in 1939 returned to Warsaw for his sister's wedding, which coincided with the invasion by the Nazis. Rabbi Elberg was able to flee, making his way through Poland, then Lithuania and then to Russia. From Vladivostok he sailed to Japan and then to Shanghai, where he arrived in September 1941 with the Mir Yeshiva. His parents, brother, sisters and his teacher Rabbi Natan Spigelglas were all sent to Treblinka where they were murdered. Rabbi Menachem Ziemba was killed in the Warsaw Ghetto. In Shanghai, he married Miriam Slutsker whose father, Rabbi Yehuda Selig Slutsker settled with his wife Dina in Harbin, Manchuria, China, after World War I. The Elbergs returned to Paris after the war, and Simcha defended a dissertation regarding slavery among Jews in ancient times at the Sorbonne. He came to New York in 1947 and served as editor of HaPardes, a journal of Talmudic academics. He was fundamental on certifying Coca-Cola for Passover.

== Works ==
In addition to editing the monthly HaPardes journal, Rabbi Elberg authored several books on his own:

- "Varshah shel ma'lah" detailing pre-World War II Warsaw (Published in Bene Barak, 1969), וורשא של מעלה
- "Imrei Simcha" detailing Jewish philosophy (New York, 1989), אמרי שמחה
- "Minchas Bikkurim" Talmudic novallae (Warsaw, 1939), מנחת ביכורים
- Jubilee book celebrating the fifty year anniversary of HaPardes, ספר היובל הפרדס
- "Shalmei Simcha" (5 volumes), שלמי שמחה

Much of the archives of HaPardes (הפרדס) has been preserved on Hebrewbooks.org.
