= Union of Orthodox Rabbis =

Orthodox Jewish organization in the United States

The Union of Orthodox Rabbis of the United States and Canada (UOR), often called by its Hebrew name, Agudath Harabonim or (in Ashkenazi Hebrew) Agudas Harabonim ("union of rabbis"), was established in 1901 in the United States and is the oldest organization of Orthodox rabbis in the United States. It had been for many years the principal group for such rabbis, though in recent years it has lost much of its former membership and influence.

== History ==
The Agudath Harabonim was formed in 1902, to espouse a strictly traditionalist agenda. Its founders were concerned with the Americanized, acculturated character of even the relatively traditional wing of local Jewry, exemplified by the Orthodox Union (OU), which had formed five years earlier, and the Jewish Theological Seminary of America, which was an Orthodox institute at the time. There were two distinct groups within the American Orthodox rabbinate: the Eastern European and the Western European and American-born: "The Americans were English-speakers, often had a secular education, and competed with Reform (and later Conservative) movements for the heart of the modern American Jew. European transplants were often Yiddish-speaking with barely any English skills, trained exclusively in rabbinics, and would be termed Haredi today, and had a stronger affinity to the entire body of religious texts; they were there to maintain standards." Though there were American scholars trained in the European path, and European schools that supported secular scholarship, most rabbis belonged to one camp or the other.

To the Eastern Europeans, the OU and its later affiliated Rabbinical Council of America, were dangerously accommodationist and lacking in both scholarship and piety. Their credentials were rarely recognized, if at all, by the UOR. The Eastern Europeans needed a fellowship to promote their ideas and raise political capital, and the Agudath Harabanim served that need.

The UOR leadership was willing to tolerate the OU in urgent needs, such as kosher supervision. The Agudath Harabonim initially started raising standards in New York and elsewhere, but had some trouble getting the butchers and shochtim in line. Henry Pereira Mendes and his colleagues in the OU in New York provided assistance in this area.

Among the main founding rabbis of the Agudath Harabonim were Bernard Levinthal, Moshe Zevulun Margolies (known as "Ramaz"), Moshe Yisrael Shapiro; and S. A. Joffee. Margolies was from Europe, and equally at ease in Yiddish and English, had feet in both camps, with a personality well suited for the modern American congregation.

Among the well-known leaders from the Agudath Harabonim's past are Rabbis Yaakov Dovid Wilovsky, Eliezer Silver and Moshe Feinstein. The organization was under the direction of Rabbi Simcha Elberg from 1970 until his death in 1995, and then Rabbi Tzvi Meir Ginsberg until his death.

== Competing Haredi organizations ==
=== Knesseth Harabonim / Assembly of Hebrew Orthodox Rabbis ===
Almost from the start, the Agudath Harabonim had critics among the Yiddish-speaking rabbis, as well. In particular, Rabbi Gavriel Wolf "Velvel" Margolis felt that the Union was too lax in some areas of Kashrus, too exclusive, and too interfering in the kashrus work he had been hired to do by his congregation. He founded a competing organization, the Knesseth Harabonim (Assembly of Hebrew Orthodox Rabbis). Evidence of the Knesseth exists starting around 1920, but a Knesseth convention claims that it had existed for some years previously; in any event, it had not been a successful organization prior to 1920.

Several public relations wars broke out between Knesseth and Agudath in the 1920s. Many of them were about competing claims of proper practice in meat supervision, wine supervision, or legitimacy of import and licensing of sacramental wine during Prohibition. However, not all was war, kashrus, or Prohibition. Both organizations worked on social issues of the day that affected Jews, and on the improvement of rabbinical life for their members.

=== Degel Harabanim and Iggud HaRabonim ===
A third, less-active group was the Council of Orthodox Rabbis (Degel Harabanim in Hebrew). It may have merged with Knesseth shortly after its founding. They are known to have shared conventions, especially in opposition to Agudath.

A later group, also small, is the Iggud HaRabonim (Rabbinical Alliance of America), founded in 1942.

=== Later years ===
The disputes among the organization seem to have died down in the late 1940s or 1950s; Knesseth and Degel faded away as a separate organization.

Only Agudath and Iggud still function today, though neither is very active.

== Today ==
=== Controversies ===
The organization has not shied away from controversy in the past.

In December 1925, Reform Rabbi Stephen S. Wise delivered a sermon about Jesus the Jew, causing an uproar culminating in an edict of condemnation against him by the Agudath Harabonim.

In 1945, at Hotel McAlpin in New York City, the Agudath Harabonim "formally assembled to excommunicate from Judaism what it deemed to be the community's most heretical voice: Rabbi Mordecai Kaplan, the man who eventually would become the founder of Reconstructionist Judaism. Kaplan, a critic of both Orthodox and Reform Judaism, believed that Jewish practice should be reconciled with modern thought, a philosophy reflected in his Sabbath Prayer Book." The prayer book was allegedly burned.

The group has regularly placed advertisements in Jewish newspapers shortly before the High Holy Days, prohibiting worship at non-Orthodox synagogues. Similarly, the Friday April 4, 1997 edition of The Jewish Press, quoted from "A Historic Declaration", issued by the Union of Orthodox Rabbis on March 31, 1997:

Reform and Conservative are not Judaism at all. Their adherents are Jews, according to the Jewish Law, but their religion is not Judaism...we appeal to our fellow Jew, members of the Reform and Conservative movements: Having been falsely led by heretical leaders that Reform and Conservative are legitimate branches and denominations of Judaism, we urge you to be guided by this declaration, and withdraw from your affiliation with Reform and Conservative temples and their clergy. Do not hesitate to attend an Orthodox synagogue due to your inadequate observance of Judaism. On the contrary, it is because of that inadequacy that you need to attend an Orthodox synagogue where you will be warmly welcomed...

The organization also condemned the National Jewish Outreach Program's Shabbat Across America/Canada program because it coordinated and helped Reform and Conservative organizations. In an advertisement placed in the Friday March 7, 2003, edition of The Jewish Press it declared:

...Agudas Horabonim cannot approve of a call to attend a Reform or Conservative temple on Friday night, or any time. As important as Kiruv—bringing Jews closer to the synagogue—is, it must be carried out in accordance with the Halacha. Since the "Shabbat Across America/Canada" does not state that the synagogue must be Orthodox, clearly implying that it can also be a Reform and Conservative temple, the Agudas Harabonim strongly disapproves, and warns all Jews not to take part in the "Shabbat Across America/Canada" program.

One of the leading organizers of the above public protests was Rabbi David Hollander, an Orthodox rabbi and writer in New York.

=== Simone Veil ===
In 2005, French politician Simone Veil, an Auschwitz survivor, was invited to speak at the commemoration of the 60th anniversary of the camp's liberation. Yehuda Levin, on behalf of the Union, wrote to the President of Poland that it was inappropriate for Veil to speak at the event, since by "having brought about the legalization of abortion in France" she was "responsible for an ongoing destruction of human life far exceeding that of the Nazis". PR Jan.27, 2005

=== Notable members ===
Notable current or recent members of the Union of Orthodox Rabbis of the USA and Canada include:

- Rabbi Malkiel Kotler, Rosh Yeshiva of Beth Medrash Govoha of Lakewood.
- Rabbi J. David Bleich, Rosh Yeshiva at Yeshiva University's RIETS and a world-renowned authority on Jewish law and ethics.
- Rabbi Reuven Feinstein, Rosh Yeshiva of Mesivtha Tifereth Jerusalem – Staten Island campus.
- Rabbi Avraham Osdoba, Senior member of the Crown Heights Beis Din, and Rosh Yeshiva of the Central Chabad Yeshiva.
- Rabbi Yosef Heller, Senior member of the Crown Heights Beis Din, and Rosh Kollel of the Crown Heights Kollel.
- Rabbi Menachem Genack, chief executive officer of the Orthodox Union Kosher Division.
- Rabbi Chaim Shlomo Ginsberg, secretary & Menahel.

=== Beis Din ===
The organization's primary function is the Beis Din which serves the Americas. The current members of the Beth Din of the Union of Orthodox Rabbis of the USA and Canada are:

- Rabbi Arye Ralbag, Av Beis Din.
- Rabbi Chaim Kraus, Senior Dayan.
- Rabbi Elimelech Lebowitz, Senior Dayan.
- Rabbi Chaim Ganzweig, Senior Dayan.
- Rabbi Sholom Shuchat, Dayan, Menahel Choshen Mishpat Dept..
- Rabbi Tzvi Ralbag, Dayan, Menahel Gittin Dept..
- Rabbi Gavriel Stern, Dayan.
- Rabbi Aaron Benzion Mandel, Dayan.
- Rabbi Ovadia Fabbi, Dayan, Menahel West Coast Dept..
- Rabbi Daniel Haramati, Dayan.

=== Criticisms ===
Critics of Agudath Harabonim's efforts claim that the group's leadership does not deserve a media bully pulpit to denounce the practices of other American Jewish movements, because its rabbinical membership represents a statistically small portion of the total number of rabbis ordained by all movements in the United States, and even by the Orthodox movement itself.

In addition, they maintain that the group's controversial activities are not vocally supported by the American Orthodox Jewish community as whole, because its centrist and Modern Orthodox rabbinical members generally do not appear with the group during such announcements. In addition, rabbis maintaining membership in both the UOR and Rabbinical Council of America frequently tend to place greater importance in, and watch more carefully, the activities of the RCA, thus making their support of UOR activities marginal at best.
