= Yosef Heller =

American Orthodox rabbi

Rabbi Yosef Heller
- Occupations: Rabbi, Member of the Crown Heights Beth Din

Yosef Avraham haLevi Heller is an American Orthodox rabbi and a member of the Chabad Hasidic movement. Rabbi Heller serves as an emeritus member of the Bais Din Tzedek (Jewish Rabbinical Court) of the Chabad community in Crown Heights, Brooklyn; he is an authority on Halacha (Jewish law) and Hasidic philosophy. Rabbi Heller holds the additional position of Rosh Kollel, head of the community's kollel, a yeshiva for married men.

== Rabbi of Crown Heights ==
As a member of the Crown Heights Beth Din (rabbinical court), Rabbi Heller is one of the community's Marah D'Asra (Aramaic מרא דאתרא, a title equivalent to "Chief Rabbi"). The rabbinical court is the spiritual and religious body governing the Crown Heights Chabad community. There are currently three rabbis serving on the Beth Din:

- Rabbi Avraham Osdoba
- Rabbi Yosef Heller
- Rabbi Yosef Braun

Each hold the title Marah D'Asra.

The Crown Heights rabbinical court is funded by the Va'ad Hakohol of Crown Heights, a religious corporation representing the Jewish community of Crown Heights.

=== Appointment ===
Rabbi Heller, along with Rabbis Yehuda Kalmen Marlow and Avraham Osdoba, was elected to the rabbinical court in a communal election, following the passing of Rabbi Zalman Shimon Dvorkin, the community's previous chief rabbi. After the passing of his wife Rabbi Heller stopped most public rabbinic activities, he still however answers rabbinic questions privately, as well as in the Kolel.

== Rosh Kollel ==
Rabbi Heller holds the additional position of Rosh Kollel, head of the community's kollel, a yeshiva for married men.

In Orthodox Judaism, it is customary for every community to establish a communal institution where a group of adult men study during the day. The men are in turn supported financially by the community.

== Statements on Jewish Law ==
Rabbi Heller has publicly stated that stringencient practices in Jewish Law (or chumras), may not be practiced if they are at the expense of other members of one's household. Heller referred to practices common in Orthodox circles, where additional stringencies are practiced on Passover.
