= Bruriah =

Jewish sage

Beruriah (also Bruriah; Hebrew: ברוריה, romanized: Bəruryā, lit. 'Certain is YHWH' or ברוריא) is one of several women quoted as one of the Chazal (Talmudic sages). She was the wife of the tanna Rabbi Meir and the daughter of Haninah ben Teradion.

== Etymology ==
Marcus Jastrow and Henrietta Szold posited that Beruriah is a Hebraization of the Latin name Valeria, after a process of rhotacism and betacism. In Hebrew, the name literally means "God is clear, God is certain." Valeria comes from the Latin valere meaning "to be healthy, to be strong."

== Biography ==
Beruriah lived during the first and second century in Roman Judaea and was the daughter of Haninah ben Teradion, one of the Ten Martyrs, who was burned to death for his faith, as was Beruriah's mother. She had two known siblings: a brother, Simon ben Hananiah, who turned to a life of crime after failing to match Bruriah's success as a teacher, and an unnamed sister, who was sold into sexual slavery and later rescued from a Roman brothel by Beruriah's husband, Rabbi Meir, all according to Avodah Zarah 18a and Bava Kamma 4:17.

She is greatly admired for her breadth of knowledge in matters of both halakha and aggadah and is said to have learned 300 halachot from the rabbis on a single cloudy day, according to Pesachim 62b. Her parents were put to death by the Roman Empire for teaching Torah, but she carried on their legacy.

Bruriah was very involved in the halachic discussions of her time and even challenged her father on a matter of ritual purity according to Tosefta Kelim Kamma 4:9. Her comments there are praised by Judah ben Bava. In another instance, Joshua ben Hananiah praises her intervention in a debate between Tarfon and the sages, saying "Beruriah has spoken correctly": Keilim Metzia 1:3

She was also renowned for her sharp wit and often caustic jibes. The Talmud relates in Eruvin 53b that she once chastised Jose the Galilean when he asked her, "By which way do we go to Lod?" claiming that he could have instead said, "By which to Lod?" (two Hebrew words rather than four), and thereby keeping the Talmudic injunction not to speak to women unnecessarily.

It is told that Bruriah taught her husband, Rabbi Meir, to pray for the repentance of the wicked, rather than for their destruction. According to the story, she once found Rabbi Meir praying that violent men in their neighborhood would die. Appalled by this, she responded to him by pointing out that the verse does not say "Let the sinners be consumed from the earth, and the wicked shall be no more", but rather states: "Let sin be consumed from the earth," with the result that "the wicked shall be no more" because they have repented. Another interpretation of the passage, one that fits with the Tiberian vocalization, suggests that Bruriah explained that the verse does not refer to "those who sin" (as a participle), but habitual "sinners" (as an agent noun).

She is described as having enormous inner strength. Midrash Proverbs tells that her two sons died suddenly on Shabbat, but she hid the fact from her husband until she could tell him in a way that would comfort him. In response, Rabbi Meir quoted the verse, "A woman of valour, who can find?"

=== The Bruriah incident ===
Avodah Zarah 18b mentions that, in the middle of his life, Rabbi Meir fled to Lower Mesopotamia, which is referred to as "Babylonia" in Jewish works. It mentions two possible motivations. The second of these is "the Beruriah incident" (Jewish Palestinian Aramaic: מעשה דברוריא), a phrase that is not explained.

Various post-Talmudic commentaries offer explanations of this incident. According to Rashi, "Commentary to Avodah Zarah" 18b, Beruriah made light of the Talmudic assertion that women are "light-minded" in Kiddushin 80b. Rashi explains the phrase "women's minds weigh lightly upon them" as indicating a lack of sexual inhibition. To vindicate the Talmudic maxim, Rabbi Meir sent one of his students to seduce her. Though she initially resisted the student's advances, she eventually acceded to them. When she realized what she had done, she committed suicide out of shame. (Other sources have it that she fell ill emotionally due to shame, and a group of rabbis prayed for her death and peace.) Rabbi Meir, in turn, exiled himself from Israel out of shame and fled to Babylonia.

This explanation has no recorded source earlier than Rashi, who lived 900 years after the time of Bruriah. It is also surprising in that it attributes serious crimes not only to Beruriah and Rabbi Meir's student (who allegedly committed adultery), but to Rabbi Meir himself (who encouraged them to commit adultery). Traditional rabbis such as Yosef Shalom Elyashiv, as well as academic scholars such as Eitam Henkin, have argued that Rashi did not write this story, but rather it was later inserted into his commentary by a mistaken student.

The Italian Jewish studies scholar Federico Dal Bo has argued that a close reading of several well-known Talmudic figures—Bruriah; her husband, Rabbi Meir; Rabbi Meir's former teacher, Elisha ben Abuyah; and a prostitute visited by the latter—can be fruitfully approached from the perspective of gender studies. According to Dal Bo, such an analysis reveals potential relationships among these characters that extend beyond the text's overt narrative surface. His interpretation is grounded in the assumption that the impulse to interpret texts is shaped by psychological and libidinal dynamics analogous to those governing human relationships. On this basis, Dal Bo identifies underlying structures within the Talmudic narrative, including a rigid division of gender roles, a normative framework distinguishing acceptable from transgressive sexuality, and a disciplined approach to hermeneutics that is closely linked to the normative status of heterosexuality.

Nissim ben Jacob of Kairouan provides a different explanation that is closer to the text. According to him, Rabbi Meir and Bruriah had to flee to Babylonia after the Roman Empire executed her father, sold her mother into slavery and her sister into sexual slavery at a brothel (to be rescued by Rabbi Meir) and were looking for her. Other rabbinic sources also take issue with Rashi's commentary, and indeed, there exists a tradition among Orthodox rabbis to name their daughters Bruriah, as an assertion of her righteousness.

The commentators explain that she could overcome that test, but God punished her for speaking badly of the sages, saying that if she had said the rabbis were correct but that she was an exception, there would have been no problems. The commentators also posit that there was no actual sin committed because the student was sterile; those who say there was an act of sexual intercourse hold that Rabbi Meir pretended to be his student.

== Legacy ==
Several modern Jewish schools for women have been named after Bruriah:

- Midreshet Lindenbaum, originally named Michlelet Bruria
- Bruriah High School for Girls, an all girls yeshiva located in New Jersey

== See also ==
- Yalta
