= Toldos Yeshurun =

Toldos Yeshurun is a Non-Profit organization for Jews from the former USSR. It was founded by Rabbi Yitzchok Zilber, leader of the Russian baal teshuvah movement and often called "the father of Russian Jewry", in 2000 with the support of Rabbi Yosef Sholom Eliashiv, Rabbi Aharon Leib Shteinman, and Rabbi Chaim Kanievsky. Since the death of Rabbi Yitzchak Zilber in 2003, the organization is headed by his son, Rabbi Ben Tzion Zilber.

The organization's goal is to provide secular Russian Jews with a Jewish education and bring them to Jewish observance.

The organization's activities take place mainly in Israel. Toldos Yeshurun also sends lecturers and printed materials to the countries of the former Soviet Union, the United States and Europe.

== Programs ==
Toldos Yeshurun yeshiva for Russian-speaking baalei teshuvah in Jerusalem
Kollel in Jerusalem for young married Russian-speaking baalei teshuvah
Kollel for Halachic Studies in Jerusalem for very advanced young community leaders to educate them into leaders of the Russian-speaking religious community
Chavruta program (evening kollel program) for new immigrants from the former Soviet Union who pair up with avreichim (young married men in full-time learning) for one-on-one Torah study in over 70 places all over Israel, including all major cities with a large Russian population. Currently, about 350 such teachers teach about 2,000 immigrants.
Eishet Chayil, network of classes for women, under the leadership of Chava Kuperman, daughter of Rabbi Yitzchak Zilber
The Russian-language website Toldot.ru features a large database of articles on a vast array of topics in Jewish religion, as well as audio and video materials. Talmud online, an online learning program via Skype for those who cannot attend live classes and study programs
Russian Jewish Matchmaking Network
Toldot Publications publishes books, periodicals and multimedia materials such as audio and video classes in Russian language
