= Menachem Ziemba =

Pre-World War II Rabbi

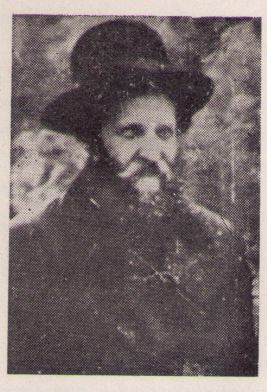
- Menachem Ziemba

Personal life
- Born: 15 September 1883; 13 Elul 5643 (Hebrew date) Praga, Poland
- Died: 24 April 1943 (aged 59) Warsaw, General Government, Germany

Religious life
- Religion: Judaism

Jewish leader
- Yahrtzeit: 19 Nisan 5703

Rabbi Menachem Ziemba (1883–1943) (Hebrew: מנחם זמבה) was a distinguished pre-World War II Rabbi, known as a Talmudic genius and prodigy. He is known to be fluent in all of Talmud as well as many of the works of the later Rabbis such as Rabbi Joseph Rosen and Rabbi Meir Simcha of Dvinsk. He was gunned down by the Germans in the Warsaw Ghetto.

== Biography ==
Rabbi Ziemba was born in Praga, a suburb of Warsaw, in 1883. His father, Elazar, died while Menachem was still a young boy and the orphan was brought up by his grandfather Rabbi Avraham Ziemba. Rabbi Avraham had been a chassid of the Kotzker Rebbe and a student of the Chiddushei Harim, and was now a follower of the Sfas Emes of Gur.

Rabbi Ziemba was brought up in the Gerrer chasidus by his grandfather and remained a loyal chasid his entire life. Even years later when he was world-renowned as a Torah scholar, Posek, and master of Hasidic thought, he still considered himself a simple Chasid of the rebbe of Ger. When he visited Ger, he was called by his first name and refused to sit at the Rebbe's top table, an honour reserved for visitors of note.

As Rabbi Ziemba grew up in Warsaw, he gained a reputation as a Talmid Chacham (scholar) and genius. He maintained a correspondence with the Gaon of Rogatchov, an individual not known for his tolerance of mediocrity, and tolerance of younger students.

At the age of eighteen, Rabbi Ziemba married the daughter of a wealthy local merchant. He was thus able to learn the Torah unhindered for the next twenty years, a time remembered by him as the happiest years of his life. His fame spread further afield, attracting the attention of Rabbi Meir Simcha of Dvinsk and others. He once confided that he authored more than 10,000 pages of Torah novellae during this golden period.

When his father-in-law died, Rabbi Ziemba found it necessary to help out in the former's store in order to continue supporting his family. He rejected numerous offers to serve as rabbi in many towns and cities, including Chief Rabbi of Jerusalem and Rabbi of Lublin, saying that he had more time to study while working than as a communal rabbi.

However, at the request of his beloved Gerrer Rebbe, Rabbi Ziemba entered communal affairs. He was appointed the representative of Praga to the Kehilla Council in Warsaw in 1935. Between 1930 and 1935, the world economic depression affected Rabbi Ziemba. His store was forced to close. He was offered the prestigious position of Chief Rabbi of Jerusalem, but turned it down. After the untimely death of Rabbi Meir Shapiro, Rabbi Ziemba was offered the position as his successor as both Rabbi of Lublin and rosh yeshiva of Yeshivas Chachmei Lublin. For unknown reasons, this never came to pass.

In 1935, Ziemba was appointed to the Warsaw Rabbinate together with Rabbi Yaakov Myer Biderman, brother-in-law of the Gerrer Rebbe, and Rabbi Avraham Weinberg. He became active as a spokesman for Orthodox Jewry in Poland and issued Halachic responsa to questions from Poland and abroad.

Rabbi Ziemba also took an active role in the Agudas Yisroel at an early stage. At its first Knessia Gedola (great gathering), he was not yet forty when chosen to serve as honorary secretary in the Moetzes Gedolei HaTorah. At the second Knessia Gedola, Rabbi Chaim Ozer Grodzenski agreed to serve as chairman of the Moetzes Gedolei HaTorah only if Rabbi Ziemba would continue in his position, while the forty-five-year-old Rabbi Ziemba felt himself to be too young and sought to stay in the background. At the third Knessiah Gedolah in 1937 in Marienbad, Czechoslovakia, which played witness to the last massive gathering of European Orthodoxy before the Holocaust, Rabbi Ziemba was at the height of his fame. He spoke twice to the full assemblage and each time was greeted with hushed silence and awe.

== World War II ==
In January 1943, in a meeting of the Warsaw Jewish leadership, Rabbi Ziemba proclaimed that traditional martyrdom (Kiddush HaShem-Sanctification of the Divine Name) was no longer an option as a response to German persecution. He stated that "sanctification of the Divine Name" must be done through resistance to the enemy. He said to a group of ghetto leaders,

“In the present we are faced by an arch foe, whose unparalleled ruthlessness and total annihilation purposes know no bounds. Halachah [Jewish law] demands that we fight and resist to the very end with unequaled determination and valor for the sake of Sanctification of the Divine Name.”

With the outbreak of World War II and the German invasion of Poland, Rabbi Ziemba became the single most important force in the Warsaw Ghetto. In the darkest days of despair, he was a source of hope, optimism and inspiration. He set up secret locations for the study of Torah, and at great personal risk, constantly visited these clandestine places to strengthen those who studied there. His wife died in the ghetto. Rabbi Ziemba was one of the few rabbinic leader who called for armed resistance. He redefined traditional martyrdom "Kiddush HaShem" as "Kiddush Ha'Chaim", the sanctification of life. According to scholar Pesach Schindler, Rabbi Ziemba summarized his idea of Kiddush Ha'Chaim when he begged for the Jews to resist right before the Warsaw Ghetto Uprising in April 1943:

‘Thus, by the authority of the Torah of Israel, I insist that there is absolutely no purpose nor any value of Kiddush Hashem inherent in the death of a Jew. Kiddush Hashem in our present situation is embodied in the will of a Jew to live. This struggle for aspiration and longing for life is a mitzvah to be realized by means of nekamah, vengeance, mesiras nefesh, and the sanctification of the mind and will.’

Rabbi Ziemba was given two opportunities to escape from the ghetto. Through the efforts of Chaim Israel and the Sternbuch family of Switzerland, he was sent a Costa Rican passport and citizenship papers. His last name, however, was misspelled—Ziember instead of Ziemba. This was enough excuse for his papers to be declared void.

In another incident, Rabbi Ziemba, along with the other two surviving members of the Warsaw Rabbinate, Rabbi Shimshon Sztokhamer and Rabbi David Shapiro, were suddenly summoned to the Judenrat. They were told that the Catholic Church was willing to rescue them. The three refused to go, saying that the existence of the Rabbinate gave Jews strength to carry on, although such a formality was no longer needed.

Rabbi Ziemba established a committee to provide Pesach supplies for the Ghetto inhabitants. He was under constant surveillance by the authorities, and as such, could not become personally involved with the Ghetto underground. However, when money was needed to obtain ammunition, he was the first to donate, and added personal blessings to this resistance movement.

He was one of the last three remaining rabbis in the Warsaw Ghetto with Rabbi Shimshon Sztokhamer (Samson Stockhammer) and Rabbi David Shapiro. Shortly before the Warsaw Ghetto Uprising began the Archbishop of Warsaw offered the three rabbis refuge in his palace. After a brief discussion all three refused the offer, not wanting to abandon the Jews of the ghetto.

== Death ==
The Warsaw Ghetto Uprising began soon before Pesach. While the battle raged around him, Rabbi Ziemba prepared himself for the coming holiday as if nothing was happening. In the evening, the fighting stopped and Ziemba conducted the Seder as though the times were normal.

The next few days were spent in hideouts watching the ghetto being burned. The Germans were methodically destroying the ghetto, house by house, in order to break the resistance. Among those burning were the houses around Kupiecka 7, including the building where Ziemba was holed up.

With the air thick with smoke and nearly impossible to breathe, Ziemba and the people with him decided to try to run across the street, past SS men manning machine guns, to the building where the "Volia Rav", Rabbi Ber, was hiding.

During a momentary lull in the shooting, when it seemed safe, Ziemba's daughter Rosa managed to run across first and then motioned to the others with her arm. Her signal was misunderstood. Believing it to be safe, Ziemba, holding his five-year-old grandson Yankele Ber by the hand, tried to make a run for dear life. Wild screams and gunfire ensued. Ziemba fell to the floor; the others retreated under the ferocious assault.

The news of the Rabbi's death quickly spread to all neighboring hideouts. In spite of the great danger, a number of minyanim gathered. A Beth Din was set up, which decided to bury the Rabbi temporarily in a grave in the courtyard of Kupiecka 4. When the ghetto was finally liquidated, his entire immediate family was taken to Treblinka where they all perished.

== Postscript ==
In 1958, upon learning that the Polish Government was planning to rebuild the area of the ghetto that included Rabbi Ziemba's grave, his nephews Rabbi Avraham and Rabbi Yitzchok Meir Ziemba (who were with him to the very end) and others expended great efforts to exhume his body and bring it to Israel. After weeks of work by surveyors and others, his grave was finally located—all landmarks remembered by the survivors had been destroyed in the interim. His body was flown to Israel and after a funeral attended by all the Moetzes Gedolei HaTorah and tens of thousands of people, he was finally laid to rest on Har HaMenuchot.

== Works ==
- Totzos Chaim, a work on the laws pertaining to carrying on Shabbos, written in honour of Rabbi Ziemba's father-in-law who died in 1920
- Zera Avraham (seed of Abraham), a correspondence between Rabbi Ziemba and Rabbi Avraham Luftiber of Warsaw, son in law of Rav Meir Simcha of Dvinsk who died at a very young age.
- Gur Arye Yehuda, a book of novellae by Moshe Yehuda Arye, Rabbi Ziemba's prodigious son, who died at the age of 19 in 1924. It also contained some correspondence between father and son.
- He wrote works on the Sifra and Sifri and they are called Otzar Hasifra and Otzar Hasifri.

Tens of thousands of pages of works authored by Rabbi Ziemba were destroyed in the burning of the Warsaw Ghetto. Among these was a treatise on the entire Rambam called Machaze Hamelech, another on the Talmud Yerushalmi called Menachem Yerushalaim, as well as hundreds of responsa and novellae on Bavli, Shulchan Aruch, Midrash and many other parts of the Torah. These works were lost for posterity.
