= Joseph Rosen =

Belarusian rabbi and talmudist (1858–1936)

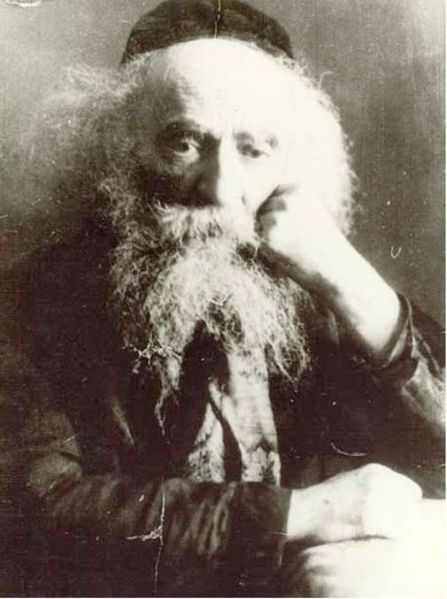
- Born: 1858; Rogachev, Mogilev Governorate, Russian Empire (now Rogachev, Belarus)
- Died: 1936 (aged 77–78); Vienna, Austria

Joseph Rosen (Yiddish: יוסף ראָזין, Yosef Rosin; 1858 – 5 March 1936) known as the Rogatchover Gaon (Genius of Rogachev) and Tzofnath Paneach (Decipherer of Secrets—the title of his main work), was an Ashkenazi rabbi and one of the most prominent talmudic scholars of the early 20th-century. Rosen was known as a gaon (genius) because of his photographic memory and tendency to connect sources from the Talmud to seemingly unrelated situations. Rosen has been described as the foremost Talmudic genius of his time. He is also estimated to have written some 20,000 responsa, making him the most prolific responsa-writer in Jewish history.

== Biography ==
Joseph Rosen was born in Rogachov, now Belarus, into a Hasidic family of Chabad-Kapust Hasidim, and was educated in the local cheder (elementary school). His unusual capabilities were noticed at the age of 13, when he was sent to study in Slutsk along with Chaim Soloveitchik (5 years his senior), under Yosef Dov Soloveitchik (Beis Halevi). He subsequently studied under Yehoshua Leib Diskin (Maharil Diskin) in Shklov. In 1889, he assumed the rabbinate of the Hasidic community in Dvinsk for almost 50 years, where his non-Hasidic counterpart was Meir Simcha of Dvinsk. They served in parallel until the late 1920s, and enjoyed excellent relations.

Among those who received semikha (rabbinic ordination) from him were Mordecai Savitsky (1911–1991) of Boston, Zvi Olshwang (1873–1961) of Chicago (brother-in-law of Shimon Shkop) and Avraham Eliyahu Plotkin (1888–1948; author of Birurei Halachot—a copy of the actual semikha is included in that work). Menachem Mendel Schneerson (the seventh Lubavitcher Rebbe, 1902–1994) is also rumored to have received semikha from him.

Rosen is remembered for his breadth of Torah knowledge and caustic wit. He did not suffer inadequacy lightly. He was similarly reputed to rarely quote any rabbinic authority post-Maimonides, and avoided recent rabbinic works of the Acharonim in favour of the Rishonim (those preceding the late 15th century). His responses to queries of Jewish law are considered enigmatic and cryptic.

Rosen died in Vienna in 1936 at the Vienna Sanitorium and his body was sent to Dvinsk for burial.

Throughout his life he maintained very close connections to Chabad-Lubavitcher Hasidim and their rebbes Sholom Dovber Schneersohn and Yosef Yitzchak Schneersohn. After Sholom Dovber's death, he supported the decision to appoint the young Yosef Yitzchak as the new Rebbe. Rosen is a famous figure in Chabad-Lubavitch folklore. His name often comes up in stories told in yeshivas and during farbrengens (Hasidic gatherings). Stories range from self-sacrifice and dedication to Torah values despite the pressures of the Russian government, to special sensitivity to the Chassidus, to his genius in the revealed Torah.

== Scholarship ==
Rosen was a noted Talmudic scholar and published a number of his works on the Talmud and Maimonides. His main work, a commentary on Maimonides, was published during his lifetime, as were three volumes of halakhic (Jewish law) responsa. Two additional volumes of responsa were published soon after his death by his daughter. The remainder of his surviving writings appeared in the United States and Israel many years after his death; all are titled Tzofnath Paneach (Decipherer of Secrets—a title given to the Biblical Joseph by Pharaoh). His manuscripts were smuggled out of Latvia in the form of micro photographs sent via mail to the Safern family in the Bronx at the outbreak of World War II by his successor, Yisrael Alter Safern-Fuchs (1911– 20th Sivan, 1942 murdered by the Nazis), who remained in Latvia to complete this task, and his daughter Rachel Citron, who had come to Dvinsk from the Land of Israel to help preserve her father's manuscripts. Both were murdered in the Holocaust. A portion of these manuscripts was edited and published by Menachem Mendel Kasher. Seven manuscripts were published by Machon Tzofnas Paneah, headed by Mordechai Pinchas Teitz. Machon Hamaor in Jerusalem is now publishing the remaining manuscripts.

Rosen's approach to Torah study is discussed in Shlomo Yosef Zevin's Ishim v'Shitot (Personalities and Approaches).

Rosen's works include responsa and novellae on Torah and Talmud. They are regarded as difficult and inaccessible, as he employs the philosophical terminology of Maimonides' The Guide for the Perplexed even in non-philosophical analyses. Kasher, therefore, included Mefa'aneach Tzefunoth (Decipherer of Secrets), an explanatory commentary to facilitate understanding of Rosen's influential work.

== Works ==
Rosen authored a number of works on Jewish law, some of which were published in his lifetime.

- Tzafnath Paane'ach – his magnum opus, a six volume commentary on Maimonides's Mishneh Torah
- Tzafnath Paane'ach al HaTorah – a five volume commentary on the bible
- Tzafnath Paane'ach al HaShas – a commentary on the Talmud, currently published on about half of the tractates of the Talmud.
- Tzafnath Paane'ach Responsa – his responsa on Jewish law (One volume printed in his lifetime, two more printed by his daughter, one additional volume printed by Rav Menachem Kasher)
- Shaalos Utshuvos Tzafnath Paane'ach Hachadashos – five additional volumes of responsa on Jewish law
- Chibur al Moreh Nevuchim – a commentary on The Guide for the Perplexed, published at the end of his commentary on the bible
- Michtvei Torah – correspondence between the Gaon and Rabbi Mordechai Kalina
