= Bruriah High School for Girls =

Yeshiva high school in Union County, New Jersey, United States

Location
- 330 Elmora Avenue; Elizabeth, New Jersey; United States
- 40.682113°N 74.216423°W

Information
- Type: Private high school, yeshiva
- Motto: At Bruriah I can
- Established: 1963
- NCES School ID: A0902120
- Principal: Bethany Strulowitz
- Faculty: 51.3 FTEs
- Grades: 7–12
- Enrollment: 213 (as of 2023–24)
- Student to teacher ratio: 4.2:1
- Colour: Maroon
- Athletics: Softball, Soccer, Volleyball, Hockey, and Basketball.
- Accreditation: Middle States Association of Colleges and Schools
- Yearbook: Aliyah
- Tuition: $22,000 (grades 9-12 for 2021-22)
- Affiliation: Modern Orthodox Judaism
- Website: bruriah.org

The Bruriah High School for Girls is a seven-year yeshiva school for girls located in Elizabeth, in Union County, New Jersey, United States, serving students in sixth through twelfth grades. The school is named after the Talmudic figure Bruriah. The current principal is Dr. Bethany Strulowitz.

Throughout the day, the student curriculum consists of both Judaic and secular studies. Bruriah, or "BHS", offers also a variety of athletic and academic teams, clubs, committees, APs, and other extracurricular activities.

The school is part of the Jewish Educational Center, which is run by Dean Elazar Mayer Teitz. The Jewish Educational Center has been accredited by the Middle States Association of Colleges and Schools Commission on Elementary and Secondary Schools since 2008.

As of the 2023–24 school year, the school had an enrollment of 213 students and 51.3 classroom teachers (on an FTE basis), for a student–teacher ratio of 4.2:1. The school's student body was 100% White.
