= Rudolf Matz =

Croatian composer (1901–1988)

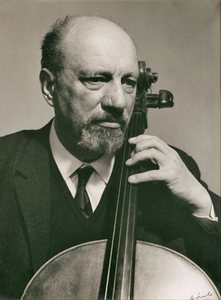
Rudolf Matz

Rudolf Matz (19 September 1901 – 22 March 1988) was a Croatian composer who wrote about 500 instrumental and vocal compositions. Matz lived in the Austro-Hungarian Empire in the Kingdom of Croatia-Slavonia. He was born in Zagreb, 1901 and died in that same city in 1988. He was an important figure in the musical life of Zagreb in the 20th century. In addition to working as a composer, he was a cellist, teacher, conductor and choirmaster. He worked in music for more than six decades, from 1920 right up to his death. He performed with eminent professional musicians as well as with skilled amateurs. His wife Margita was a pianist, harpsichordist and keyboard teacher.

== Career ==
Leonard Rose called Matz, "perhaps the greatest cello theoretician in the world." Janos Starker said, "Rudolph Matz's dedication and expertise has produced much needed material for the young cellist." Matz studied violoncello, composition and conducting at the Zagreb Academy of Music, from which he graduated in 1926.

He became Professor of Cello at the Zagreb Music Academy (1940–41 and 1950 until his retirement in 1972), achieving international renown for his cello-teaching methods, which he brought together in a compendium entitled 'First Years of the Cello' in 32 volumes (1948–1962). In 1982, Dominis Music was founded in Ottawa, Canada, by Matz's student Slobodan Gospodnetic to publish Matz's works. He would be invited to take part in the work of juries in cello competitions, in Moscow and Florence.

Rudolf and Margita Matz donated their long-time home in the second floor flat at 15 Mesnicka Street to Zagreb City Museum, together with their invaluable effects. The Margita and Rudolf Matz Memorial Collection will be set up in the apartment, once famed for its encounters with musicians and its intimate concerts (in 1967, for instance, Matz was visited here by celebrated cellist Mstislav Rostropovich).

== Selected works ==
- Faun
- Concerto for Flute and Strings (1963)
- Simmons, Jonathan W (2024). A Performance Edition of Concerto in Modo Antico by Rudolf Matz (Thesis). ProQuest 3061946930.
- Sonata in E Minor for Violoncello and Pianoforte
- Sonata No. 1 in D Minor for Violoncello and Pianoforte
- String Quartet No. 1 in F Minor
- Classical Concerto in D Major for Violoncello and Orchestra
- String Quartet No. 3 in C Major 'Pastoral'
