= Yehuda Kalmen Marlow =

Rabbi Yehuda Kalmen Marlow
- Born: 17 February 1932; Frankfurt, Germany
- Died: 23 June 2000 (aged 68); Brooklyn, New York City, U.S.
- Occupations: Rabbi, Crown Heights Jewish community
- Predecessor: Rabbi Zalman Shimon Dworkin
- Successor: Rabbi Avraham Osdoba

Rabbi Yehuda Kalmen Marlow (17 February 1932 – 23 June 2000) was a German-American Hasidic rabbi associated with the Chabad movement. Rabbi Marlow served as the rabbi of the Crown Heights Jewish community from 1985–2000.

== Biography ==
Rabbi Marlow was born in Frankfurt, Germany, in 1932. His family moved to the United States in 1939. Rabbi Marlow later joined the Chabad movement. Years later he was elected to the Crown Heights Beth Din (rabbinical court), and eventually succeeded Rabbi Zalman Shimon Dworkin as Av Beth Din.

Rabbi Marlow died in 2000 from a heart attack. He was buried in the Old Montefiore Cemetery in Queens.
