= Crown Heights Beis Din =

Jewish rabbinical court in New York City, U.S.

- Formation: 1985
- Founder: Rebbe Menachem Mendel Schneerson
- Legal status: Religious Court
- Member: Rabbi Avrohom Osdoba
- Member: Yosef Yeshaya Braun
- Stam Expert: Rabbi Menachem Kahn

The Beis Din Tzedek of Crown Heights a.k.a. Crown Heights Badatz is the Beis din of the Chabad community in the Crown Heights neighborhood, home of 770 Eastern Parkway. It was established in 1985. The offices are located in the center of the neighborhood on Kingston Avenue, between Crown and Montgomery Streets. They operate Crown Heights Kosher as well as Ask the Rabbi Hotline.

== Eruv ==
In 2025 the Beis Din of Crown Heights reissued a statement on an eruv in Crown Heights, signed by Rabbi Avrohom Osdoba and Rabbi Yosef Braun, banning its use and noting that the Rebbe was opposed to the establishment of an eruv in Crown Heights. The independently built Crown Heights Eruv was created by Rabbi Zishe Rub of Mishmeres Haeruv.

== Links ==
- https://chcentral.org/resources/rabbonim/
- https://chabadpedia.com/index.php/Crown_Heights_Beis_Din
- https://asktherav.com/about-us/
