= Jalta, Jalta =

Croatian musical from 1971

- Poster
- Music: Alfi Kabiljo
- Lyrics: Milan Grgić
- Premiere: 28 December 1971; 54 years ago: Komedija Theatre in Zagreb, SR Croatia

Jalta, Jalta is a Yugoslav musical from 1971. The libretto was written by Milan Grgić, the music was composed by the renowned Croatian composer Alfi Kabiljo, and the production was directed by Vlado Štefančić.

Its first performance took place on 28 December 1971 in Zagreb at the Komedija Theatre, while the official premiere was held on 7 January 1972. The musical quickly became one of the most successful and long-running stage productions in the history of Yugoslav and Croatian theatre.

The story is loosely inspired by the Yalta Conference held in February 1945 in Yalta, where Allied leaders Franklin D. Roosevelt, Winston Churchill, and Joseph Stalin negotiated the post-war division of Europe. Instead of focusing on the political leaders themselves, the musical humorously follows the lives of three hotel servants from the United States, the United Kingdom, and the Soviet Union who work at the conference venue.

The original Zagreb production starred actors from the Komedija Theatre ensemble and quickly became extremely popular with audiences. The show ran for hundreds of performances, over 650 of which were performed by the Komedija Theatre ensemble alone. It was later staged in other cities across the former Yugoslavia. Because of its popularity, a television recording was also produced on 12 March 1974 and broadcast on Yugoslav television throughout the 1970s.

Throughout the years, Jalta, Jalta has remained a highly popular musical, particularly in Croatia. The production has been revived several times at the Komedija Theatre in Zagreb, with notable stagings in 2010, 2013, and 2024.

Due to its lasting popularity and cultural significance, the musical was also released on DVD in 2013, allowing audiences to watch the famous stage production outside the theatre.

== Plot ==
The musical takes place in Yalta, Ukraine, during the Yalta Conference, while Winston Churchill, Joseph Stalin and Franklin Roosevelt were dividing the world. Three valets have arrived to Yalta with them: the Russian, Griša; the American, Larry; and the British, Stanley. They were in charge of guarding and airing out of laundry for the Big Three.

The valets are all placed in the old Aramovski villa, in which the housekeeper Nina Filipovna takes care that everybody lives in friendship and unity. They, too, start to discuss the dividing of the world, and maybe they would succeed if there wasn't for the "Green Meadow", a small piece of land in the Antarctic of which the Big Three are completely oblivious.

In the meantime, the generals and delegates attending the conference start to notice strange things on the great map of the world located in the recreation room. A mysterious green spot is forming in the Antarctic. All the generals and delegates become upset.

There is a silent war among the valets. They keep getting into conflicts over everything. Nina tries to be the mediator of the group. She splits everything to three equal parts, even a branch they use to dry their clothes. But, open conflict develops among the valets because of that branch. Griša, unbeknownst to the others, starts hanging his clothes all over the whole branch. The others catch him red-handed and a big fight ensues. There is a danger that all the valets will leave the villa. So, Nina intervenes. She decides to be gentle to each and every one of them. However, it is discovered that she is gentle only with Larry and Stanley. Griša is infuriated. He was betrayed. Open conflict ensues among the valets. A duel.

While they are fighting, a bomb, which is located in the garden of the villa, activates. It starts to spin out of control, begins to smoke and make strange noises. Everybody panics and escapes before it explodes.

Meanwhile, the green spot on the map keeps growing. The generals manage to find out that Nina Filipovna knows something more about that spot. Agents act at once, and arrest Nina. They question her, but she doesn't say anything.

The day of departure comes. Valets are packing. The Aramovski villa is damaged in the bomb explosion, and all of the valets wear bandages.

The agents and generals wish to know everything about the "Green Meadow". Valets don't say a thing. Then Nina is brought in the room with her hands tied behind her back. Out of fear for Nina, valets agree that they are ready to say everything about the "Green Meadow", under the condition that Nina is let go. The generals persuade all of them that they have no intentions of dividing the "Green Meadow". They just wanted to know if there was grass, flowers or butterflies there. When they are told that there was all of those things there and more, the generals are thrilled that there is a piece of land in the world which belongs to no-one and which won't be divided.

Nina is released. She and the valets make a deal that all of them will go to the "Green Meadow" together some day. And who knows, maybe the whole world will become a green meadow some day.

The musical ends with all of the participants singing the song "Neka cijeli ovaj svijet" ("May This Whole World").

== Music ==
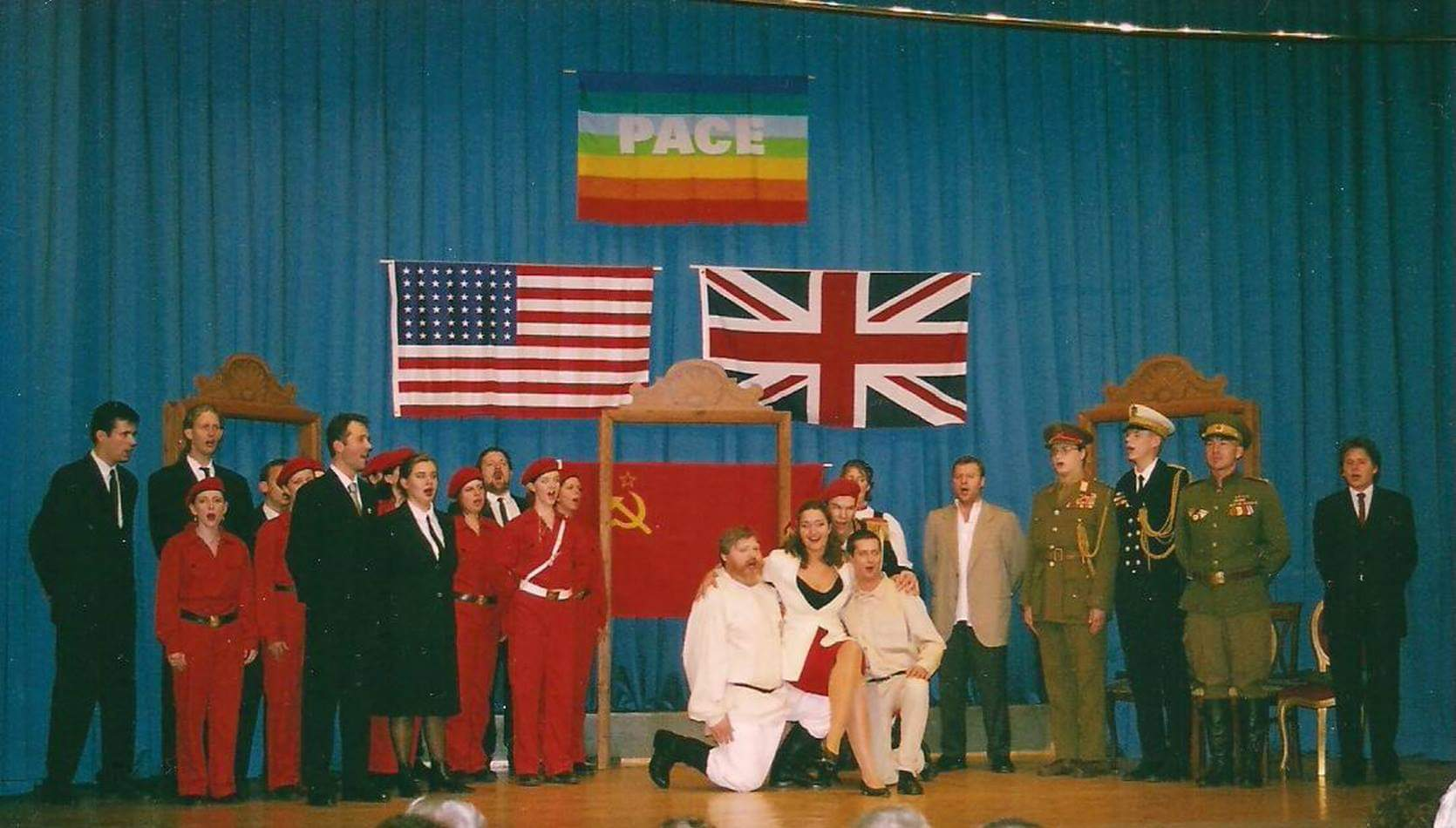
Alfi Kabiljo: Jalta Jalta, Vienna 2004

Music for Jalta, Jalta was composed by Alfi Kabiljo, which made him famous. Musical is composed of those songs:

1. Uvertira (Overture)
2. Mi smo agenti (We are the agents)
3. Tri sobara (Three valets)
4. Zelena livada (Green meadow)
5. Whisky, votka, gin
6. Mi radimo (We work)
7. Jalta, Jalta (Yalta, Yalta)
8. Peri, peri (Wash, wash)
9. Nek se zrači (Air it out)
10. Čunčurluk
11. Povuci, potegni (Pull, yank)
12. Što će biti sutra (What will be tomorrow)
13. Govori, Nina (Speak, Nina)
14. Na Antarktik (To the Antarctic)
15. Neka cijeli ovaj svijet (May this whole world)
