= Yalta (Talmudic character) =

Wife of Babylonian Rabbi, Rav Nachman

Yalta (Hebrew: ילתא, romanized: Yalta) is among the few named female characters mentioned in the Babylonian Talmud who was a member of a rabbinic family. Yalta was the wife of Rav Nachman, a rabbinic sage from around 250 CE. The scholar Judith Hauptman suggests that Yalta was also the daughter of the Jewish exilarch in Babylon and considers her depiction in rabbinic literature as a strong-willed, free-spirited woman. Yalta is the second most-mentioned woman in the Talmud, after the daughter of Rav Chisda, and appears to have been knowledgeable in matters of Jewish ritual law.

== In the Talmud ==
Yalta, wife of Rav Nachman, appears in the Babylonian Talmud in a number of instances. In Tractate Berakhot (51b), Yalta is described as breaking four hundred jugs of wine after a guest offended her and womankind in general. In Tractate Kiddushin (70b), Yalta offers her husband counsel in protecting himself from a colleague. In Tractate Chullin (109b), Yalta asks her husband for a kosher food that would taste like the equivalent of meat cooked in milk, he complies by having udders prepared for her. In Tractate Gittin (67b), it appears that Yalta was familiar with medicinal knowledge.

The view that Yalta was the daughter of the Jewish exilarch is found in Rashi's commentary on the incident described in Tractate Gittin (67b) and cites a statement in Tractate Chullin (124a) (that Rav Nachman was the son-in-law of the exilarch) as support for this view.

== See also ==
- Bruriah
