= Rav Teitz Mesivta Academy =

Yeshiva high school in Union County, New Jersey, United States

Location
- 330 Elmora Avenue; Elizabeth, Union County, New Jersey 07208; United States
- Coordinates: 40.666772°N 74.234660°W

Information
- School type: Yeshiva High School, Private High School
- Motto: תורה עם דרך ארץ (Torah with the way of the land)
- Religious affiliation: Orthodox Judaism
- Established: 1955
- Founder: Pinchas Mordechai Teitz
- Sister school: Bruriah High School for Girls
- Authority: Jewish Educational Center
- NCES School ID: A0502330
- Dean: Elazar Mayer Teitz
- Principal: Ami Neuman
- Faculty: 26.1 FTEs
- Grades: 9-12
- Gender: Male
- Enrollment: 145 (as of 2019–20)
- Student to teacher ratio: 5.6:1
- Sports: Basketball, Hockey, Baseball, Softball, Soccer, Wrestling, Tennis
- Team name: Thunder, Chargers
- Accreditation: Middle States Association of Colleges and Schools
- Newspaper: The Jolt, B'Kol Ram
- Tuition: $22,000 (2021-22)
- Website: jechs.org

Rav Teitz Mesivta Academy, commonly known as RTMA or JEC High School, is a Yeshiva high school located in Elizabeth, New Jersey and a branch of the Jewish Educational Center. Founded in 1955 by Rabbi Pinchas Mordechai Teitz, RTMA adheres to the tenets and practices of Orthodox Judaism. It is one of the country's earliest and leading Modern Orthodox Yeshiva high schools. RTMA's dual curriculum offers courses in Torah studies, as well as college preparatory academics. Most of its students reside in the Orthodox Jewish communities of New Jersey and New York. The school has been accredited by the Middle States Association of Colleges and Schools Commission on Secondary Schools since 2008 and is accredited until January 2024.

As of the 2019–20 school year, the school had an enrollment of 145 students and 26.1 classroom teachers (on an FTE basis), for a student–teacher ratio of 5.6:1. The school's student body was 100% White.

== Mission ==
Guided by the principle of "Torah Im Derech Eretz," RTMA educates its students on the importance of actively engaging the modern world while remaining committed to Torah values. The pillars of its educational curriculum are centered on Limudei Kodesh and secular studies. The Limudei Kodesh curriculum consists of a broad range of courses ranging from shiurim on Nevi'im and contemporary Halacha to a Beis Midrash program with an intensive focus on Gemara. With regard to secular studies, the overarching goal is to provide an education that thoroughly prepares students for studies on the college level and beyond.

== History ==
The Jewish Educational Center was the keystone of Rabbi Pinchas Mordechai Teitz's life mission to create a community that would synthesize Judaism and modernity. Following his death in December 1995, Rabbi Teitz's obituary in The New York Times outlined his legacy and, by extension, the history of RTMA:

Rabbi Pinchas Mordechai Teitz was a scion of a line of rabbis stretching back centuries. He was born in Latvia and trained in rabbinical seminaries in Lithuania. He arrived in the United States in 1933 for what he thought would be a yearlong lecture tour. Instead, he stayed to marry Bessie Preil, daughter of Rabbi Elozor Mayer Preil, the rabbi of what was then a small Orthodox community in Elizabeth. He succeeded his father-in-law in the rabbinate upon Rabbi Preil's death in the 1930s. Since then, the community, founded in 1881, has grown to some 5,000 people affiliated with five synagogues under one united rabbinate. Rabbi Teitz established that rabbinate and the family tradition is upheld by his son, Rabbi Elazar Mayer Teitz, who has been his associate since 1958. The Jewish Educational Center he founded [in 1941] made Elizabeth the fourth American city, after New York, Boston and Baltimore, to offer a full-range Jewish and secular education. It consists of the elementary Yeshiva, along with Mesivta Academy, a high school for boys, and Bruriah High School for girls. Together, they have more than 900 students. When he founded the Jewish Educational Center, the preamble of its bylaws promised that it would become something for Jewish communities throughout the United States to emulate. Its success was recognized by the Government of Israel in 1968, when it singled out Elizabeth as a model Jewish community and presented it with a medal.

Since the obituary was published, the Jewish Educational Center has continued to attract approximately 900 students per year, approximately 200 of which attend RTMA. The Jewish community that Rabbi Teitz established in Elizabeth continues to flourish and many of its members send their children to Jewish Educational Center schools.

== Academics ==
=== Secular studies curriculum ===
==== Core requirements ====
- English: 8 semesters, comprising courses such as Language Usage, Composition, Survey of American Literature, Survey of English Literature, Survey of Work Literature
- Mathematics: 8 semesters, comprising courses such as Algebra I, Algebra II, Geometry, Precalculus, Calculus, Business Math
- Social Studies: 6 semesters, comprising courses such as Global Studies/World History, U.S. History I (Colonial Period through the Civil War), U.S. History II (Civil War through current affairs)
- Sciences: 6 semesters, comprising courses such as Biology, Physical Science, Chemistry, Physics and/or Psychology
- Language: 6 semesters of either Hebrew or Spanish
- Jewish History: 2 semesters, courses cover the history of the Jews from Medieval Times through the development of the modern state of Israel

==== Advanced Placement courses ====
- AP Biology
- AP Calculus
- AP Chemistry
- AP English Language
- AP English Literature
- AP Micro-Economics
- AP Physics
- AP Psychology
- AP US History
- AP Computer Science A
- AP Statistics

==== Electives ====
- Advanced Independent Learning
- Business Math
- Introduction to Business and Finance
- Current World Affairs
- History of Zionism and Modern Israel
- Marketing

=== Limudei Kodesh curriculum ===
The Limudei Kodesh department is tracked into three levels of instruction in order to provide an ideal caliber of learning for students with varying degrees of experience in Torah studies. The daily schedule includes courses in Gemara, Halacha, Chumash, and Na"ch. For twelfth grade students, RTMA offers a Beit Midrash program, enabling students to experience chavrusa-style learning that will prepare them for a year of full-time Torah study in Israel. There are also several out-of-school learning opportunities such as Sunday Shiur, Night Seder, Mishmar, and Yeshiva University's TLN program.

== Athletics ==
RTMA has a variety of sports teams, including basketball, hockey, baseball, softball, wrestling, and soccer.

=== Basketball ===
The RTMA Thunder basketball team is one of the original members of the Metropolitan Yeshiva High School Athletic League (MYHSAL). Its achievements include a record of four league championships in the 1970s, as well as recent playoff berths by both its JV and Varsity squads. Their Varsity team is coached by Avi Borenstein and their JV team is coached by Rabbi Joshua Hess.

=== Hockey ===
RTMA's hockey team, originally called the Lightning, has been a part of the MYHSAL hockey league for several decades. The JV team was started in 2005 and the names of both teams were changed to the Thunder in 2012. In 2007, the Varsity team played in the longest hockey game in the history of the MYHSAL. The game, a first round playoff game against Flatbush, was won by the Lightning in quadruple overtime.

=== Wrestling ===
As opposed to the other RTMA athletic teams, which are split into JV and Varsity divisions, the wrestling team comprises students from every grade. The team is coached by David Rodriguez, Micky Aflalo, and Moshe Rosenwald. The RTMA squad has had numerous successes in the Wittenberg wrestling tournament, including two podium finishes in 2015 in the 132 and 145 pound weight classes by Mishan Rosenzweig and Mike Kachan, respectively.

== Extracurricular Activities ==
=== Academic Teams ===
- Gildor - For motivated science students, the Gildor Club allows students to compete in the annual Gildor Project, a contest that requires teams to research, design, build, and implement an invention which addresses a given societal issue. The RTMA group has been repeatedly chosen to present its innovations in the advanced stages of the competition that take place in Israel and has been crowned the semi-final winner three times.
- Debate
- Mock Trial
- JV College Bowl
- Varsity College Bowl
- JV Torah Bowl
- Varsity Torah Bowl
- NJ Challenge
- Chess
- Model UN
- CIJE Robotics

=== Student Council ===
The Student Government Organization (SGO) is a vehicle for student involvement in the high school and is encouraged by the administration to demonstrate a degree of self-governance. The SGO is composed of students from all years. Departments and positions within the student government include a Chesed Chair, Israel Action Chair, Publications Department, VP of Sales, Multimedia Department, Secretary, VP, and President.

=== Clubs ===
- Cooking
- CPR/First Aid
- Study Hall
- Politics
- Math
- Krav Maga
- Music
- Personal Finance
- Tzitzi

== Leadership ==
The Dean of the school is Rav Elazar Mayer Teitz, who received Semicha from Rav Isaac Halevi Herzog, the Chief Rabbi of Israel. He earned a master's degree in Education from Loyola University in Baltimore, and an MS and PhD in mathematics from the Belfer Graduate School of Science at Yeshiva University. He also spent time studying in Yeshivas Ponovizh. The school's Principal, Rabbi Ami Neuman, earned a BS in Information Systems from the Syms School of Business at Yeshiva University before completing coursework towards a master's degree in Jewish Education and Administration from Azrieli. Rabbi Neuman received Semicha from RIETS. Rabbi Noach Sauber, the Assistant Principal, studied for several years at the Mirer Yeshiva and at the Kollel in Edison, which was then followed by supplementary schooling at the Mercaz Center for Teacher Training.

== Post-High School ==
RTMA considers itself a "five year program" with the first four years on the school's campus in Elizabeth and the subsequent year spent continuing Torah study in Israel. RTMA students are prepared for their year in Israel throughout their high school experience through the Limudei Kodesh portion of the curriculum. The majority of RTMA students matriculate at an American university after their gap-year in Israel, although some choose to continue their Torah study in Israel or join the Israeli Defense Forces. RTMA students commonly enroll in colleges in the tri-state area including Yeshiva University, Lander College, Queens College, Rutgers University, and New York University.
