= Zalman Shimon Dworkin =

American rabbi (1901–1985)

Rabbi Zalman Shimon Dworkin
- Born: 1901; Rogachov, Belarus
- Died: 1985 (aged 83–84); Brooklyn, NY
- Occupation(s): Chief Rabbi, Crown Heights Jewish community
- Successor: Rabbi Yehuda Kalmen Marlow

Zalman Shimon Dworkin was the Chief Rabbi of the Jewish community in Crown Heights, Brooklyn, and a prominent member of the Chabad Hasidic movement.

== Biography ==
Dworkin was born in 1901 in Rogachov, Belarus. He emigrated to the United States in 1958. He served as the Crown Heights Jewish community's chief rabbi until his death in 1985. Dworkin was succeeded in this role by Yehuda Kalmen Marlow.

As Dworkin was a Chabad Chassid, his rabbinic authority was sought by the Lubavitcher Rebbe, Menachem Mendel Schneerson.
