= Avraham Osdoba =

American Orthodox rabbi

Rabbi Avraham Osdoba
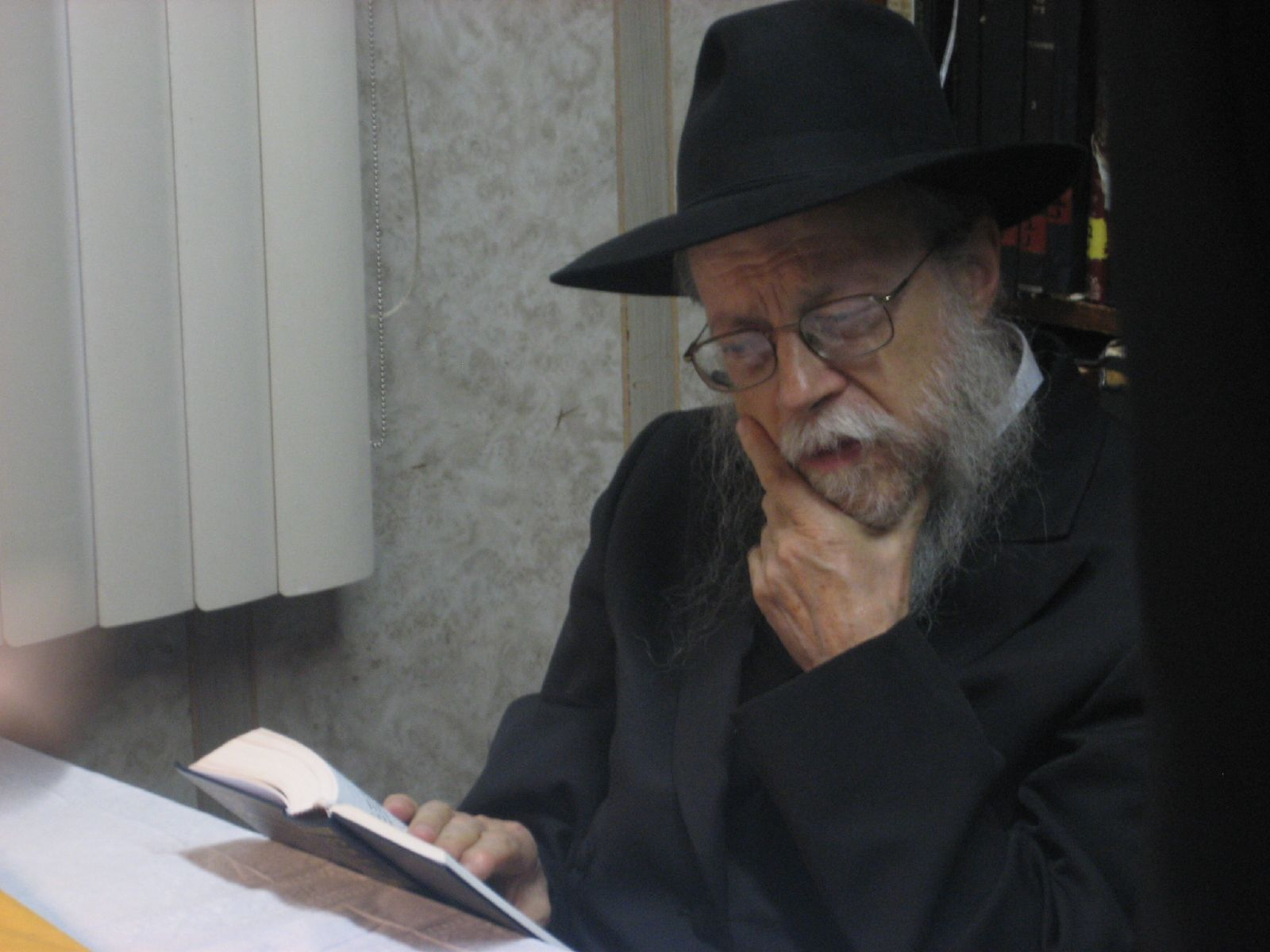
- Born: June 3, 1935 (age 90)
- Occupations: Chief Rabbi, Crown Heights Jewish community
- Predecessor: Rabbi Yehuda Kalmen Marlow

Avraham Osdoba is an Orthodox rabbi and a member of the Chabad Hasidic movement. Rabbi Osdoba serves as a rosh yeshiva in 770 in addition to being a member of the Bais Din Tzedek (Jewish Rabbinical Court) of the Chabad community in Crown Heights, Brooklyn; he is an authority on Halacha (Jewish law), Talmud and Hasidic philosophy.

== Rabbi of Crown Heights ==
As a member of the Crown Heights Beis Din (rabbinical court), Rabbi Osdoba is one of the community's Marah D'Asra (Aramaic מרא דאתרא, a title equivalent to "Chief Rabbi"). The rabbinical court is the spiritual and religious body governing the Crown Heights Chabad community. There are currently three rabbis serving on the Beth Din:

- HaRav Avraham Osdoba
- HaRav Yosef Avraham haLevi Heller
- HaRav Yosef Yeshaya Braun

Each hold the title Marah D'Asra. As head of the court, Rabbi Osdoba holds the additional title of Av Beth Din (head of court).

The Crown Heights rabbinical court is funded by the Crown Heights Jewish Community Council (CHJCC), a religious corporation representing the Jewish community of Crown Heights.

=== Appointment ===
In 1986, the Lubavitcher Rebbe encouraged the chasidim to vote for the members of the bais din. Rabbi Osdoba along with Rabbi Heller and Rabbi Marlow won the election and they each assumed the title Mara D'Asra. Rabbi Osdoba assumed the role as Av Beth Din (chief rabbi) of the rabbinical court, following the death of Rabbi Yehuda Kalmen Marlow, the court's first head rabbi.

== Crown Heights Kashrus ==
Aside from the usual responsibilities of a community rabbi (officiate weddings etc.) Rabbi Osdoba also administers Crown Heights Kashrus (CHK, a kosher certification agency operating under the Crown Heights rabbinical court.
