= Yitzchok Zilber =

Russian Rabbi

Rabbi Yitzchok Yosef Zilber (Hebrew: יצחק זילבר; 1917–2004) was a Russian, later Israeli-Russian Haredi rabbi and a leader of the Russian baal teshuva movement.

== Early life ==
Rabbi Yitzchok Zilber was born in Kazan, Russia, several months before the Bolshevik Russian Revolution in 1917. His father, Rabbi Ben Tzion Chaim Zilber (originally Tsiyuni), a respected rabbinic scholar and rabbi of the city of Kazan, refused to send his son to an anti-religious Soviet school and taught him privately at home, teaching him Jewish law and tradition as well as secular knowledge. By the time young Yitzchok Zilber was 15, he was giving classes in Judaism across the town, despite the fact that this was against the Soviet law. His brilliance gained him entrance to the faculty of Mathematics of the University of Kazan despite never having attended public school. Rabbi Zilber married Gita Zeidman, and they had four children – Sarah, Ben Tzion Chaim, Chava, and Fruma Malka.

== Life under Communist rule ==
After World War II, Rabbi Zilber was imprisoned in a gulag for a technical accidental crime (a fellow Jew left some illegal papers by him, and a search revealed them. He did not want to tell to police who had left the papers by him and so he was consequently imprisoned. Ironically, the owner himself regretted Rabbi Zilber being imprisoned for him and went to the police to admit his responsibility. As typical to Russia at the time, they happily admitted him to prison as well, leaving Rabbi Zilber there as well). He was forced to do heavy menial labor, but later attested to having never violated the Jewish Sabbath and other Torah commandments. Indeed, he taught Torah to other Jewish prisoners. Rabbi Zilber received amnesty after Stalin's death in 1953, and returned to Kazan. While not openly violating state rules, in 1960 the KGB started harassing him, making a cover story about the sorry children of a religiously fanatic father who makes them suffer for Jewish laws etc. A large gathering was announced in the school where he taught and in the school where his wife taught. He was barred from his teaching job, and the KGB also attempted to take his children away from him, and promising his wife an apartment and a quiet life if she would agree to a divorce. When he received an invitation for an interview in the KGB, Yitzchok Zilber fled from Kazan, and after a long journey stayed in Tashkent and was able to move his family there a short time later. The family tried to emigrate to Israel, but was refused for years, until they finally received permission and emigrated in 1972.

== Life in Israel ==
When he arrived in Israel, Rabbi Zilber found that the vast majority of Russian-speaking Jews were not observant and for the most part, completely ignorant, of Jewish law and tradition. He undertook to change this situation, and began teaching extensively throughout the country as well as organizing circumcisions, since the Israeli rabbinate was not as yet prepared for such a large number of immigrants who needed to have a circumcision performed. Rabbi Zilber worked tirelessly to help Russian women receive gittin (bills of divorce) after being abandoned by their husbands. Many of them were "complicated by the fact that the partners of the broken marriage were often living in different countries, and locating them was far from easy". However locating them was often necessary to comply with Jewish law. Often this was meant endless efforts, exquisite inventiveness, and (as he puts it in his autobiography) "a large dose of Divine providence". At the end of his autobiography he shares a sample from his "impressing collection of unusual stories" that came out of this endeavor.

He was available to everyone who came to seek his advice, which led to his fame in certain circles as "the father of Russian Jewry." Rabbi Zilber taught in Russian organizations such as Dvar Yerushalayim, Torat Haim, the Russian division of Ohr Somayach, Shuvu, and Shvut Ami. In 2000, he established the Toldos Yeshurun organization to provide Jewish education to the secular Russian Jews, which continues his work today, under the guidance of his only son, Rabbi Ben Tzion Zilber.

Rabbi Yitzchok Zilber died in 2004, on the 8th of Av, and his funeral took place on the eve of Tisha b'Av (the Ninth of Av), the greatest day of tragedy in Jewish history.

== Influence ==
Rabbi Yitzchok Zilber's books – especially his autobiography To Remain A Jew, his Talks on Torah, a collection of essays on the weekly Torah portion, The Fire will not burn you – are very popular among Russian-speaking Jews and have inspired many to return to their Jewish heritage and become baalei teshuva or learn more about Judaism. His extensive teaching and personal guidance has brought thousands of Russian-speaking Jews to observance, and transformed large parts of secular Russian Jews into religious communities. The vast majority of Russian-speaking Rabbis, Torah teachers and Jewish leaders today are either his students or students of his students. His son is Rabbi Ben Zion Zilber a teacher and adviser to Russian Jews. His sons-in-law are Rabbi Avraham Kooperman, teacher in the Mir Yeshiva, Rabbi Chaim Zavdi, a mashgiach ruchani, and Rabbi Yosef Shvinger, director of a State organization governing holy places in the land of Israel.
