= Crown Heights Jewish Community Council =

Nonprofit organization in New York City, U.S.

- Abbreviation: CHJCC
- Formation: 1969
- Website: https://chcentral.org/

Crown Heights Jewish Community Council (CHJCC) is a nonprofit organization run by Jewish residents of Crown Heights, Brooklyn. CHJCC acts as a social service agency provides services to community residents including assistance to the elderly, housing, employment and job training, youth services, and a food bank.

== Activities ==
Formed in 1969, CHJCC administers social service programs operating in Crown Heights, Brooklyn. The agency provides referrals for community residents on issues of housing, employment, economic development, entitlements, problems of the aging and aid to crime victims.

CHJCC also provides employment and job training, youth services and a food bank.

=== Representative of the Jewish community ===
CHJCC also serves as a legal body representing the needs of the Crown Heights Jewish community. The organization's mission includes a pledge to represent and speak in the behalf of the local Jewish community, and to combat antisemitism.

The Crown Heights Jewish community is mostly composed of Chabad Hasidim.

=== Project Care ===
CHJCC has created a multi-racial, faith, and community-based program called "Project Care". Project Care has explored new avenues of communication and cooperation between local civic and religious leaders within the community. The project promotes social and economic development in Crown Heights.

== Organizational structure ==
CHJCC is run by a council, headed by the council chairman; the chairman and other members of the council are appointed in a public election, held every three years.

=== Elections ===
The elections are overseen by a council representing all Crown Heights synagogues, referred to as the "N’tzigim". In the event the N'tzigim are unable, or otherwise refuse to supervise the election, CHJCC must hire an outside firm to oversee the election.

== See also ==
- Jewish Community Council
