= Jewish Educational Center =

Jewish day school in Elizabeth, New Jersey

Location
- 330 Elmora Avenue; Elizabeth, NJ; 40.666949°N 74.234586°W

Information
- Type: Private K-12 school, Yeshiva, Synagogue, and Jewish community
- Established: 1940
- Faculty: 89.5 (on FTE basis)
- Grades: PreK–12
- Enrollment: 758 (plus 74 in Pre-K)
- Accreditation: Middle States Association of Colleges and Schools
- Affiliation: Orthodox Judaism
- Website: www.thejec.org

The Jewish Educational Center is an eighty-year-old yeshiva school located in Elizabeth, in Union County, in the U.S. state of New Jersey, serving students in pre-kindergarten through twelfth grades. Throughout the day the student curriculum consists of Judaic and secular studies. JEC, as it is commonly known, is run by its dean, Rabbi Elazar Mayer Teitz. The school has been accredited by the Middle States Association of Colleges and Schools Commission on Secondary Schools since 2008 and is accredited until January 2024. The Jewish Educational Center also includes the Jewish communities of Elizabeth and Hillside, including five synagogues, a mikveh and a cemetery.

The school includes three divisions:

- JEC Lower School: Pre-Kindergarten to 5th grade for boys, Pre-Kindergarten to 5th grade for girls, founded in 1939.
- Rav Teitz Mesivta Academy (RTMA) : 6th to 12th grade for boys, founded in 1955.
- Bruriah High School for Girls: 6th to 12th grade for girls, founded in 1963.

As of the 2013-14 school year, the Yeshiva of Elizabeth (now JEC Lower School) had an enrollment of 205 students (plus 74 in pre-K) and 31.8 classroom teachers (on an FTE basis), for a student–teacher ratio of 6.4:1. The Rav Teitz Mesivta Academy had an enrollment of 190 students and 21.0 classroom teachers (on an FTE basis), for a ratio of 9.0:1. The Bruriah High School for Girls had an enrollment of 377 students and 23.0 classroom teachers (on an FTE basis), for a ratio of 16.4:1.

Advanced Placement (AP) courses offered are: AP Chemistry, AP Physics B, AP Physics C, AP Calculus AB and BC, AP Computers A and AB, AP United States History, AP English Literature and Composition, AP Russian, AP Psychology, AP Biology, and AP Statistics. Most of these are only primarily offered to juniors and seniors.

Each year over 90% of the Senior class studies for a year or two in yeshivas in Israel before beginning college.

The Jewish Educational Center uses the Arrowsmith Program.

== Administration ==
- Rabbi Elazar Mayer Teitz - Dean
- Rabbi Ami Neuman - Principal of RTMA-JEC High School
- Rabbi Uzi Beer - Principal of JEC Lower School, RTMA-JEC Middle School
- Bethany Strulowitz - Principal of Bruriah

== Extracurricular activities ==
=== Athletics ===
JEC has been a member of the Yeshiva League since the league's inception in 1979. JEC teams include:

==== JJV - Middle School ====
- Basketball
- Hockey

==== JV - High School ====
- JV Basketball
- JV Hockey
- JV Softball

==== Varsity - High School ====
- Varsity Wrestling
- Varsity Basketball
- Varsity Hockey
- Varsity Softball
- Varsity Baseball
- Varsity Volleyball

==== All High School ====
- Soccer
- Swim

=== Academic teams ===
- Gildor Team (3 time semi-final winners)
- Debate
- Mock Trial
- JV College Bowl
- Varsity College Bowl
- JV Torah Bowl
- Varsity Torah Bowl
- NJ Challenge
- Chess
- Model UN

=== Clubs ===
- Israel Advocacy
- Cooking
- CPR/First Aid
- Medical Research
- Gildor
- Unconventional Halacha
- Study Hall
- Meaningful Movies
- Politics
- Workout
- Parsha
- Fantasy Football Prep.
- Art

== Community ==
The JEC community consists of five synagogues, as well as many other services for the Jewish community of the Elizabeth-Hillside area.

Synagogues

- Elmora Avenue Shul
- Adath Israel
- Beis Yitzchak
- Adath Jeshurun
- Elmora Hills Minyan
