= Faculty for Comparative Religion =

Within the field of comparative religion, the Faculty for Comparative Study of Religions and Humanism (FVG), located in Wilrijk, Antwerp (Belgium), is an independent Faculty founded in 1980 and recognized in Belgium by Royal Decree (dated June 20, 1980). Its constitution runs as follows: "The objective of the Association is to launch, to organize and to manage at International University Level the comparative study of religions. All present and future members declare solemnly that the FVG will not and never be submitted to any doctrinal system. The most absolute tolerance will bind and lead for all relations between members and all those concerned with the Faculty."

== History ==
On December 15, 2009, a Royal Decree was signed concerning the new titles of the diplomas. These are a Basic diploma (after 3 years) and an Advanced diploma (after 4 years). The Faculty is also recognized by the Ministry of Social Affairs (August 10, 1993), with reference to the Royal Decree of June 18, 1969, as an Educational institution of the third level.

In February 2006, a partnership was signed with the Free University Brussels (VUB). In addition to this partnership, an agreement was signed concerning academic know-how, integration of the library, student follow up, etc. On behalf of the VUB rector B. Van Camp signed and on behalf of the FVG rector Chr. Vonck.

Besides this partnership the FVG keeps bilateral agreements with many universities all over the world, including Korea, Israel, Iran, India and Russia.

== Library ==
The campus library contains about 15,000 books on Eastern and Western religions, comparative study of religions and philosophy. The sections on Buddhism and Hinduism are visited by international scholars.

== Publications ==
Annually, the FVG publishes Acta Comparanda. This is a journal with academic articles and reviews about the new published books on religion, comparative religion and associated sciences.

== Jainism ==
On June 27, 2007, the World Council for Jain Academies (WCJA) Department of Jain Studies was inaugurated by Dr. Natubhai Shah and minister Kathleen Van Brempt.

== Kierkegaard ==
In 1989, the Danish Ministry of Education donated the FVG a nice collection of books by and on Søren Kierkegaard. A little bit later the famous Kierkegaard scholar and publisher of 'The International Kierkegaard Newsletter' Dr. Julia Watkin visited the faculty and met Belgian philosophers from the Free University of Brussels (VUB) and the Roman Catholic University of Louvain (KUL).

In 1991, Dr. J. Taels (UA) delivered several lectures at the FVG, and as a result the "Working Group Kierkegaard" was established. Every last Friday of the month this group gathers in order to discuss the literature of this philosopher.

== Information ==
Faculteit voor Vergelijkende Godsdienstwetenschappen (FVG) in: The World of Learning, London

== See also ==
- Comparative theology
- Institute for Interreligious Dialogue
- Interfaith
- List of religions
- Parliament of the World's Religions
- Religious universalism
