= Julius Berman =

American attorney and rabbi (1935–2025)

- Born: August 2, 1935; Dūkštas, Lithuania
- Died: December 30, 2025 (aged 90)
- Education: Yeshiva College (BA); New York University (JD); RIETS (Semikhah)
- Relatives: Ari Berman (nephew)

Julius "Julie" Berman (August 2, 1935 – December 30, 2025) was an American attorney and Orthodox rabbi. He was involved in many large Jewish organizations, many of which are non-denominational, and has served in key leadership positions.

== Early life and education ==
Berman was born in Dūkštas, Lithuania, and raised in Hartford, Connecticut, the son of Henoch, a rabbi and shochet, and Sarah Berman. He first attended Yeshiva of Hartford elementary school and was in its first graduating class. He graduated from Yeshiva Torah Vodaas high school in 1952. He then attended Yeshiva University, graduating from Yeshiva College in 1956 and receiving ordination from the Rabbi Isaac Elchanan Theological Seminary in 1959. He received his Juris Doctor from the New York University School of Law in 1960, graduating cum laude and first in his class.

He received an honorary doctorate from Yeshiva University in 1995.

== Career ==
As a confidant of Rabbi Joseph B. Soloveitchik, Berman helped publish his works. Professionally, he was a partner in the law firm of Arnold & Porter Kaye Scholer.

=== Organizations ===
Berman was a longstanding board member of RIETS and was chairman emeritus of the board, having served as its chairman for many years. He has been president of the Conference on Jewish Material Claims against Germany since 2014, and was previously chairman of its board. He has headed many national and international Jewish organizations, including the Conference of Presidents of Major American Jewish Organizations, the Orthodox Union, the Jewish Telegraphic Agency, and the American Zionist Youth Foundation.

He has served in a leadership capacity at the following organizations:

- National Jewish Commission on Law and Public Affairs (COLPA)
- OU - Orthodox Union - Union of Orthodox Jewish Congregations in America
- Conference of Presidents of Major American Jewish Organizations
- American Zionist Youth Foundation (AZYF)
- Jewish Telegraphic Agency (JTA); president from 1989 until merger to 70 Faces
- Chairman of the Board, of the RIETS - Rabbi Isaac Elchanan Theological Seminary and the Claims Conference - the Conference on Jewish Material Claims Against Germany.

== Personal life and death ==
Berman was married to Dorothy "Dotty" Berman, a graduate of the Stern College for Women and Ferkauf Graduate School of Psychology. His Yiddish name is Yudl. Berman's nephew is Ari Berman, President of Yeshiva University. His cousin is Rabbi Yaakov Bender, Rosh HaYeshiva of Yeshiva Darchei Torah in Far Rockaway, New York.

Berman died on December 30, 2025, at the age of 90.
