= Richard Joel =

American Jewish scholar

Richard M. Joel

President Emeritus of Yeshiva University
- In office 2017- Present- Professor at YU

President of Yeshiva University
- In office 2003 - 2017
- Preceded by: Norman Lamm
- Succeeded by: Ari Berman

Personal details
- Spouse: Esther née Ribner
- Children: 6
- Education: New York University
- Occupation: attorney, professor, Leadership Guru

Richard M. Joel is a Jewish scholar who was the fourth president of Yeshiva University (YU), a Modern Orthodox Jewish university in New York City. He has written on topics that include Jewish leadership, the BDS movement on college campuses, and civil discourse.

== Education ==
Richard Joel graduated from Yeshiva University High School for Boys in 1968. Joel received his BA and JD from New York University, where he was a Root-Tilden law scholar. He received honorary doctorates from Boston Hebrew College and Gratz College. He was an assistant district attorney and Deputy Chief of Appeals in the Bronx. His career continued as associate dean and professor of law at YU's Benjamin N. Cardozo School of Law.

== Hillel presidency ==
From 1989 to 2003, Joel served as President and International director of Hillel: The Foundation for Jewish Campus Life, an organization which supports Jewish life for college and university students throughout the world. In 1994, Joel orchestrated Hillel's independence from B'nai B'rith, its parent organization since 1925. While at Hillel, Joel attracted major philanthropists such as Michael Steinhardt, Edgar Bronfman, Sr., and Lynn Schusterman and Charles Schusterman. During his tenure, Hillel partnered with Birthright Israel, launching the Steinhardt Jewish Campus Service Corps, a group of recent college graduates tasked with engaging unaffiliated Jews and drawing them to Judaism and Jewish events. Hillel also expanded to the former Soviet Union and South America. Joel's tenure at Hillel has been criticized by some as providing stylish instead of substantive Judaism. However, he also received praise for his "skilled management, magnetism, personal warmth," as well as revitalizing the Hillel movement.

During his tenure at Hillel, Joel served as the head of the special commission impaneled by the Orthodox Union (OU) to investigate allegations that community leaders had ignored charges against the abusive outreach rabbi Baruch Lanner, an executive with the OU's National Conference of Synagogue Youth (NCSY). The commission concluded that many OU and NCSY leaders had made serious errors in judgment.

== Presidency of Yeshiva University ==
President Joel at YU Commencement

Joel became president of YU in 2003, succeeding Rabbi Dr. Norman Lamm, who had been president since 1976. He stepped down in June 2017. As YU President, Joel appointed new deans for Yeshiva College, the Albert Einstein College of Medicine, the Syms School of Business, and the Rabbi Isaac Elchanan Theological Seminary (RIETS), and added faculty positions throughout the university. He facilitated the construction of the Jacob and Dreizel Glueck Center for Jewish Study, and established the Center for Jewish Future. Joel established the Katz School of Graduate and Professional Studies, and restructured Yeshiva University’s Albert Einstein College of Medicine. Joel also worked to strengthen the Jay and Jeanie Schottenstein and S. Daniel Abraham honors programs.

As president of RIETS, he established the Rabbinic Personal Development Program, a joint Graduate Program in Pastoral Counseling between RIETS and Ferkauf. The joint program provides opportunities for second-, third- and fourth-year RIETS students who plan to pursue a career in Jewish communal work. Additionally, President Joel established various centers and programs including the university's centers for Ethics, Public Health and the Jewish Future, and the Glatt Program on Israel and the Rule of Law. He also established a Presidential Fellowship program that provides training and professional development to recent graduates to further their path toward communal leadership.

He was appointed President Emeritus and continues as the Bravmann Family University Professor, teaching leadership courses across Yeshiva University.

== Personal life ==
Joel was raised in Yonkers, New York. He and his wife Esther (née Ribner), who holds a PhD from YU's Ferkauf Graduate School of Psychology, have six children. They currently reside in Riverdale, New York.

Academic offices
Preceded by Norman Lamm	4th President of Yeshiva University; 2003–2017	Succeeded by Ari Berman
