= Ari Berman =

American rabbi

Rabbi Ari Berman
- ארי ברמן
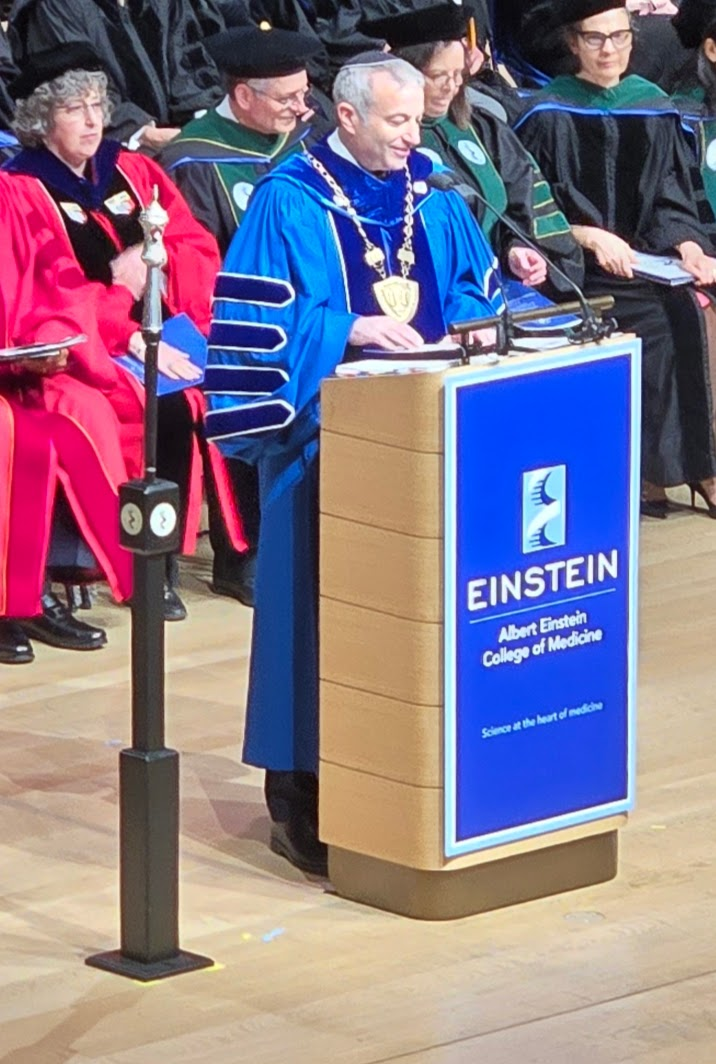

5th President of Yeshiva University
- Incumbent
- Assumed office June 5, 2017
- Preceded by: Richard Joel

Personal details
- Born: 1970 (age 55–56) Queens, New York City, U.S.
- Relations: Julius Berman (uncle)
- Education: Yeshiva University (BA, MA) Hebrew University of Jerusalem (PhD)

Ari Berman (Hebrew: ארי ברמן; born February 18, 1970) is an American-Israeli Modern Orthodox/Religious Zionist rabbi and academic administrator serving as the fifth president of Yeshiva University.

== Early life ==
Berman was raised in Queens, New York, and graduated from the Marsha Stern Talmudical Academy in 1987. He studied at Yeshivat Har Etzion in Alon Shevut before earning a Bachelor of Arts degree from Yeshiva College, graduating magna cum laude in 1991, rabbinical ordination from the Rabbi Isaac Elchanan Theological Seminary, and an M.A. in medieval Jewish philosophy from Bernard Revel Graduate School. In 2016 Berman completed a Ph.D. in Jewish thought from Hebrew University of Jerusalem under the guidance of Moshe Halbertal on the topic of Ger Toshav—gentiles who accept the Noahide Laws—in Jewish law of the Middle Ages.

== Career ==
Berman served as a rabbinic intern, assistant rabbi, and associate rabbi at The Jewish Center of Manhattan beginning in 1994 and was promoted to be its lead rabbi in 2000. He also taught Talmud in the Stone Beit Midrash Program of Yeshiva University starting in 1998.

In 2008, he left the Jewish Center and moved to Israel, where he completed a Ph.D. in Jewish thought from Hebrew University of Jerusalem in 2016 under the guidance of Moshe Halbertal on the topic of Ger Toshav—gentiles who accept the Noahide Laws—in Jewish law of the Middle Ages. He also served as Rosh HaMerkaz of the Heichal Shlomo Jewish Heritage Center in Jerusalem and was an instructor at Herzog College. While in Israel, he resided in Neve Daniel.

On November 16, 2016, Berman was named President of Yeshiva University. He began his tenure on June 5, 2017, succeeding Richard Joel. The formal investiture ceremony took place the following September 10. He is both President and one of the Rosh Yeshiva of Yeshiva University.

In 2021, he delivered the keynote address at the first Holocaust Commemoration Day event in Dubai. He spoke at Brigham Young University in 2023 on the intersection of faith and education.

Berman delivered the benediction at the second inauguration of Donald Trump in Washington, D.C., on January 20, 2025. He was the first American-Israeli to deliver remarks at a presidential inauguration, as well as the second Orthodox rabbi to do so.

In an interview published on May 7, 2026, Berman described a doctrine he calls Ger Toshav, in which Modern Orthodoxy finds groups with common values that require no theological compromise. “They don’t realize, in Halacha there’s a third dimension: the non-Jew with whom we share values." As an example, he cites his friendship with Charlie Kirk, saying “We had a relationship. He was very appreciative.”

== Books ==
The Final Exam: Letters to Our Students (Maggid Books, 2023)

== Personal life ==
Berman is married to Anita Berman, and they have five children.

Berman's uncle was Julius Berman, a rabbi and lawyer who served on the Board of Trustees of Yeshiva University and as Chairman Emeritus of the Board of Trustees of Rabbi Isaac Elchanan Theological Seminary.

Academic offices
Preceded by Richard Joel	5th President of Yeshiva University; 2017–current	Succeeded by incumbent
