= BMP2 =

BMP2 or BMP-2 may refer to:

- Bone morphogenetic protein 2
- Boyevaya Mashina Pekhoty (BMP-2), a Soviet infantry fighting vehicle

== See also ==
- BMP (disambiguation)
- BMP1 (disambiguation)
- BMP3 (disambiguation)
- BMP2K, BMP-2-inducible protein kinase
