= Bitmap (disambiguation) =

Bitmap is a type of memory organization or image file format used to store digital images.

Bitmap or bit map may also refer to:

- Bit array, general bit-addressed data structures
- Bitmap graphics, also known as raster graphics, an image represented by a generally rectangular grid of pixels (co-sitting points of colors)
  - Bitmap file format, a bitmap graphics file format with .bmp filename extension
- Bitmap index
- Free-space bitmap, an array of bits that tracks which disk storage blocks are in-use

== See also ==
- Bit
- BMP (disambiguation)
- Map
