= Yeshiva University (disambiguation) =

Yeshiva University is a private Jewish university in New York City

Yeshiva University may also refer to:

- Yeshiva University High School of Los Angeles. Los Angeles, California, USA
- Yeshiva University High School for Boys, New York City, New York State, USA
- Yeshiva University Museum, New York City, New York State, USA

== See also ==
- Yeshiva College (disambiguation)
- Yeshiva (disambiguation)
