= Yeshiva (disambiguation) =

A yeshiva is a traditional Jewish Rabbinical educational institution.

Yeshiva or Yeshivah may also refer to:

== Educational ==
- Yeshiva.co, an online Torah school
- Yeshiva day school
- Yeshiva University (disambiguation)
- Yeshiva College (disambiguation)
- Yeshivah Centre (disambiguation)

== Other uses ==
- The Yeshiva (novel), a novel by Chaim Grade
- Yeshiva International, an online news site

== See also ==
- Category:Yeshivas
- Yeshiva Boys Choir
- Yeshiva English, a dialect of English
- Yeshiva Week, a mid-winter break for yeshiva schools in North America; corresponding to Christmas/New Year's break
- WebYeshiva, an online midrasha and yeshiva
