= BMP1 =

BMP1 may refer to:

- Bone morphogenetic protein 1
- The BMP-1, an infantry fighting vehicle

== See also ==
- BMP (disambiguation)
- BMP2 (disambiguation)
