= Yeshivah Centre =

Yeshivah Centre can refer to either of the following two Orthodox Jewish Australian organisations run by the Chabad-Lubavitch movement:

- Yeshivah Centre, Melbourne
- Yeshivah Centre, Sydney

== See also ==
- Yeshiva
- Yeshiva (disambiguation)
