= Yeshiva College =

Yeshiva College (also Yeshivah College) can refer to:

- Yeshivah College, Australia, an Orthodox Jewish day school for boys near Melbourne
- Yeshiva College, a Jewish day school run from 1956 to 2003 by Yeshivah Centre in Sydney, Australia
- Yeshiva College of South Africa, a Jewish day school in Glenhazel, Johannesburg, Gauteng
- Yeshiva College (Yeshiva University), undergraduate college for men in Manhattan, New York, United States
- Yeshiva College of the Nation's Capital, part of Yeshiva of Greater Washington, in Silver Spring, Maryland, United States
- Ner Israel Yeshiva College, a Haredi yeshiva in Thornhill, Ontario, Canada

== See also ==
- Yeshiva
- Yeshiva (disambiguation)
- Yeshiva University (disambiguation)
