= Dūkštas =

- City
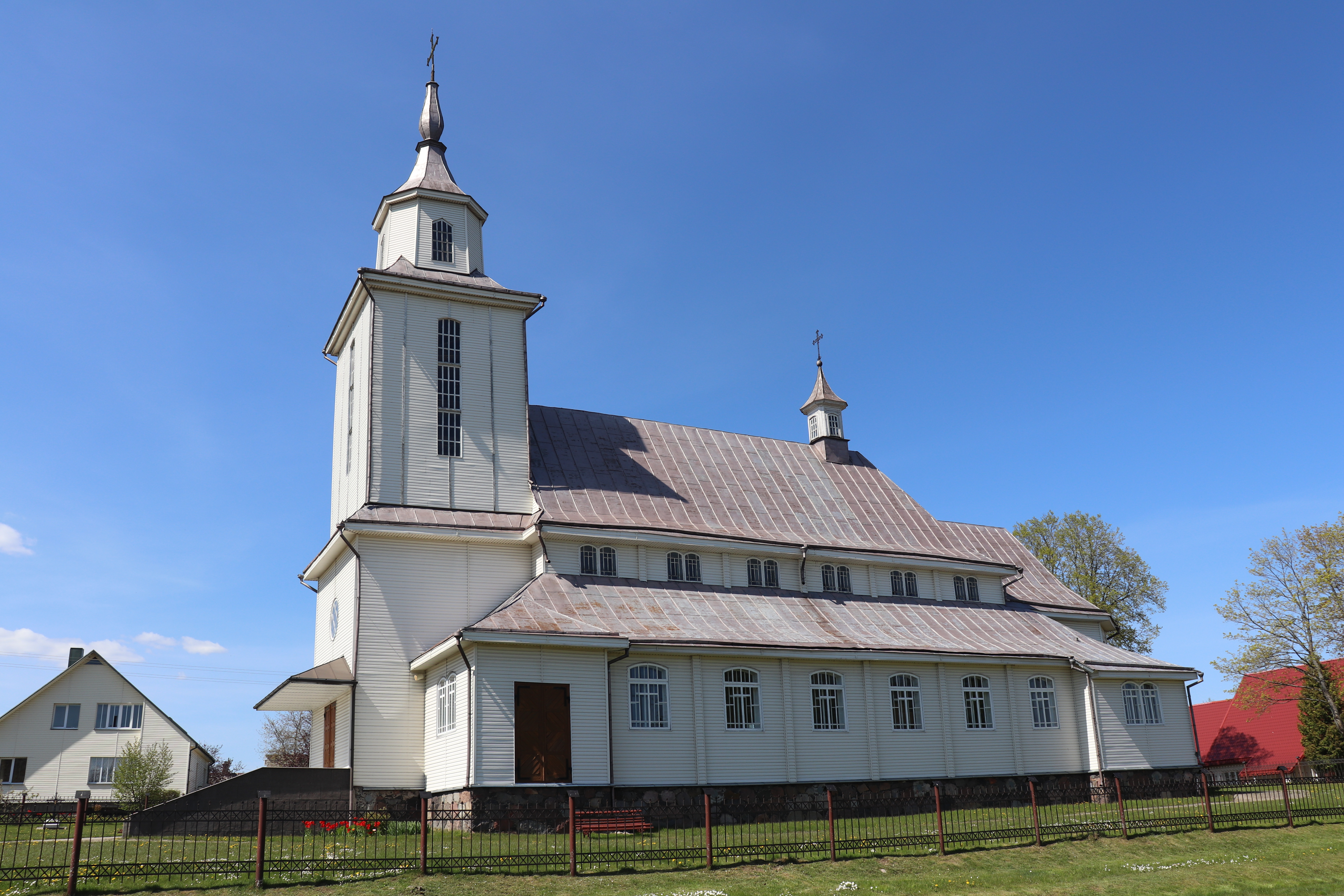
- Church of Dūkštas

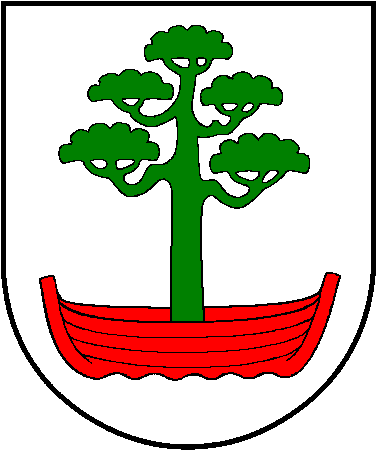
- Coat of arms

- Location of Dūkštas
- Coordinates: 55°31′20″N 26°19′10″E
- Country: Lithuania
- Ethnographic region: Aukštaitija
- County: Utena County
- Municipality: Ignalina district municipality
- Eldership: Dūkštas eldership
- Capital of: Dūkštas eldership
- First mentioned: 1862
- Granted city rights: 1956

Population (2021)
  - Total: 729
- Time zone: UTC+2 (EET)
  - Summer (DST): UTC+3 (EEST)

Dūkštas (Polish: Dukszty) is a city in Utena County, Lithuania, 26 km (16 mi) north from Ignalina, on the bank of Lake Dūkštas.

== History ==
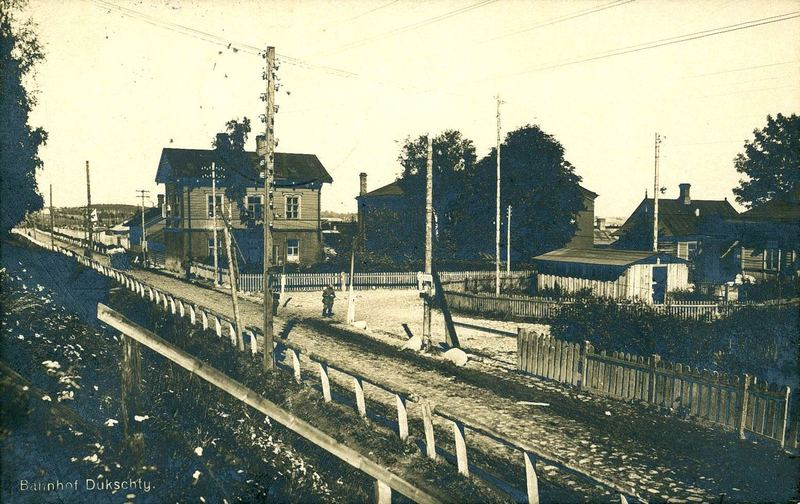
Railway station in 1916

During World War I, the town was occupied by Germany.

In the interbellum, it was administratively located in the Wilno Voivodeship of Poland. According to the 1921 Polish census, the town had a population of 1,076, of which 91.1% declared Polish nationality.

During World War II, it was initially occupied by the Soviet Union until 1941, then by Nazi Germany until 1944, and then once again by the Soviet Union, which eventually annexed it from Poland. The German administration operated a forced labour camp for Jews in the town.

== Climate ==
Climate data for Dūkštas (1991–2020 normals)
Month	Jan	Feb	Mar	Apr	May	Jun	Jul	Aug	Sep	Oct	Nov	Dec	Year
Mean daily maximum °C (°F)	−2.0 (28.4)	−1.2 (29.8)	3.7 (38.7)	11.9 (53.4)	17.7 (63.9)	21.1 (70.0)	23.3 (73.9)	22.2 (72.0)	16.7 (62.1)	9.7 (49.5)	3.5 (38.3)	−0.5 (31.1)	10.5 (50.9)
Daily mean °C (°F)	−4.2 (24.4)	−4.0 (24.8)	0.0 (32.0)	6.8 (44.2)	12.4 (54.3)	15.9 (60.6)	18.1 (64.6)	17.0 (62.6)	12.0 (53.6)	6.3 (43.3)	1.4 (34.5)	−2.4 (27.7)	6.6 (43.9)
Mean daily minimum °C (°F)	−6.6 (20.1)	−6.8 (19.8)	−3.5 (25.7)	2.1 (35.8)	7.1 (44.8)	10.9 (51.6)	13.3 (55.9)	12.3 (54.1)	8.1 (46.6)	3.4 (38.1)	−0.6 (30.9)	−4.5 (23.9)	2.9 (37.2)
Average precipitation mm (inches)	40 (1.6)	37 (1.5)	36 (1.4)	37 (1.5)	60 (2.4)	69 (2.7)	75 (3.0)	68 (2.7)	55 (2.2)	58 (2.3)	43 (1.7)	44 (1.7)	622 (24.5)
Average relative humidity (%)	87	85	77	68	68	72	74	76	81	85	89	89	79
Source: Lithuanian Hydrometeorological Service

== Notable people ==
- Charles Rappoport (1865–1941), militant communist politician, journalist and writer, who lived most of his life in France
- Jerzy Turonek (1929–2019), Polish-Belarusian historian
- Julius Berman (1935-2025), prominent Orthodox Jewish leader
