= Baruch Lanner =

American former Orthodox rabbi (born 1949)

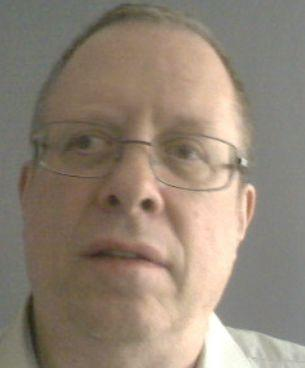
- Mug shot of Lanner
- Born: October 20, 1949 (age 77); New Jersey, United States
- Other name: Bernard S. Lanner
- Occupation: Former rabbi
- Conviction: Child sexual abuse
- Penalty: Seven years in prison, paroled for four years

Baruch S. Lanner (born October 20, 1949) is an American former Orthodox rabbi who was convicted of child sexual abuse.

== Career ==
Lanner was the principal of Hillel Yeshiva High School in Ocean Township, New Jersey and later the director of regions for the Orthodox Union's National Conference of Synagogue Youth (NCSY).

== Crimes ==
In 2000, an investigative series published in The Jewish Week alleged that Lanner had physically and sexually abused young kids for decades. Lanner resigned the day after it was published. The story, "Stolen Innocence," later won an award for "meritorious journalism."

An investigation was conducted by the Orthodox Union (OU). The investigating committee, headed by then-Hillel President Richard Joel, spent over $1 million interviewing more than 140 people and issued a 330-page report detailing the abuse. The report alleged that Lanner had physically, sexually and emotionally abused dozens of teenagers, including fondling girls and kneeing boys in the groin, and that the abuse had begun in 1970. As a result of the report, the executive vice president of the OU, Rabbi Raphael Butler, resigned. He had been criticized for failing to act on earlier complaints.

Lanner was convicted in 2002 of sexually abusing two teenage girls who attended the religious school where he had been principal, and sentenced to seven years in prison. An appeals court dismissed one of the child endangerment charges in 2005. He was released on parole on January 10, 2008, and was given parole for four years.

== Aftermath ==
A second report commissioned in 2001 by the OU found that the abuse had been overlooked for decades, despite multiple complaints, and that "profound errors of judgment" had been made, including failures of management. The case has been described as "well-publicized" and a "watershed in the way the Orthodox community addresses sexual abuse".

In 2003, the members of the Beth Din that had investigated Lanner in 1989, Rabbis Mordechai Willig, Yosef Blau, and Aaron Levine, apologized to the victims for not acting to stop the abuse. Blau was singled out by Willig for counseling victims over the years.

== Move to Israel ==
In June 2022, Lanner flew to Israel under the guise of tourism and requested Israeli citizenship under the Law of Return. The Israeli government awarded Lanner temporary legal residency. On July 19, 2022, Minister Ayelet Shaked announced that Israel would not be offering citizenship to Lanner in light of his convictions in the US. He remains in Israel under a temporary visa.
