= Norman Lamm =

American rabbi (1927–2020)

Rabbi Norman Lamm
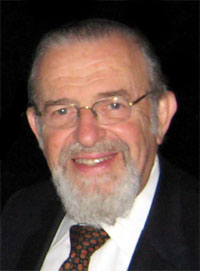
- Rabbi Lamm, 2007

Personal life
- Born: December 19, 1927 Brooklyn, New York, U.S.
- Died: May 31, 2020 (aged 92) Englewood, New Jersey, U.S.
- Spouse: Mindella Mehler
- Children: Shalom, Chaye, Joshua, and Sara
- Education: Yeshiva University (BS, PhD)

Religious life
- Religion: Judaism
- Denomination: Orthodox

Jewish leader
- Yeshiva: RIETS
- Organization: Yeshiva University
- Ended: July 1, 2013
- Semikhah: RIETS

Norman Lamm (December 19, 1927 – May 31, 2020) was an American Modern Orthodox rabbi, scholar, academic administrator, author, and Jewish community leader. He was the Chancellor of Yeshiva University until he announced his retirement on July 1, 2013.

Lamm served as the third President of Yeshiva University, the first to be born in the United States. He was a disciple of Rabbi Joseph B. Soloveitchik (one of Orthodoxy's most influential modern scholars), who ordained him at the Rabbi Isaac Elchanan Theological Seminary, Yeshiva University's rabbinical school in 1951.

== Early life and education ==
Lamm was one of four siblings and grew up in Williamsburg, Brooklyn. His father, Samuel, had several different jobs, including as a kosher inspector for New York state. His mother, Pearl (née Baumol), was descended from a respected rabbinic family. In his youth, Lamm attended Mesivta Torah Vodaath in Williamsburg, Brooklyn. He attended Yeshiva College, the men's undergraduate school of Yeshiva University, and obtained a degree in chemistry in 1949 before working in a clandestine laboratory in upstate New York developing munitions for the newborn State of Israel. He was the secular studies valedictorian of his graduating class. In 1951, he was ordained as a rabbi at the Rabbi Isaac Elchanan Theological Seminary, Yeshiva University's rabbinical school. He also took graduate courses at the Polytechnic Institute of Brooklyn (now the New York University Tandon School of Engineering). He considered a career in medicine but was persuaded by Rabbi Dr. Samuel Belkin, the second President of Yeshiva University (successor of Rabbi Dr. Bernard Revel), to join the faculty at Yeshiva University. Lamm later earned a Ph.D. in Jewish philosophy from Yeshiva University.

Lamm's maternal grandfather was Rabbi Yehoshua Baumol (1880–1948), who authored the responsa entitled Emek Halakha. In that work, Baumol cited several insights from the then-young Lamm and responded to his questions. It was Baumol who encouraged Lamm to leave Mesivta Torah Vodaath to attend Yeshiva College, where Rabbi Joseph B. Soloveitchik would become his mentor.

== Career ==
Lamm spent almost 25 years as a pulpit rabbi. He was the Assistant Rabbi to Rabbi Joseph Lookstein of Congregation Kehilath Jeshurun in Manhattan, New York. His first pulpit was in Springfield, Massachusetts. He was appointed rabbi of the West Side Jewish Center (Congregation Beth Israel) in 1952; became an assistant rabbi at the Jewish Center on the Upper West Side of Manhattan in 1958; and then the senior rabbi of the Jewish Center from 1959 to 1976. In 1959, he also became a professor in Jewish philosophy at Yeshiva University.

In 1958, Lamm helped found Tradition, an academic journal of Modern Orthodox thought. He also launched the Torah U-Madda Journal.

He obtained his Ph.D. in 1966 and was elected President of Yeshiva University in August 1976—succeeding Rabbi Samuel Belkin, YU's second president. When he took over the institution, he helped save it from looming bankruptcy, raised its endowments, and led the school to a national top-100 school ranking. Lamm also played important roles in Jewish scholarship. At a time when ArtScroll was in financial trouble, Lamm introduced the publisher to philanthropist Jerome Schottenstein. The introduction led to the financial support from Schottenstein, whose namesake was bestowed on the Schottenstein English translation of the Babylonian Talmud.

Upon the establishment of the Simon Rockower Memorial Writing Competition by the American Jewish Press Association in 1980, Lamm was named the competition's inaugural head.

== Personal life ==
Lamm was married to Mindella, who died of COVID-19 on April 16, 2020, at the age of 88. At the time of his death in May 2020, Lamm had two sons, Shalom and Joshua, and a daughter, Chaye Warburg. He had a second daughter, Sara Lamm Dratch, who died in 2013. He was also survived by 17 grandchildren and numerous great-grandchildren. He was the uncle of Shalom Auslander. In Auslander's book Foreskin's Lament, he calls Lamm "Nathan."

== Theology ==
As a Modern Orthodox Jew, Lamm's theology incorporated the corpus of classical rabbinic Jewish principles of faith. The faith that he preaches and teaches is consistent with these teachings. He believed that God exists, that God can reveal his will to mankind, and that the Torah (five books of Moses) is an exact transcription of God's revelation to Moses on Mount Sinai. He believed that Judaism's oral law, as recorded in the Mishnah and Talmud and subsequent rabbinical interpretation, represents an accurate and authoritative understanding of how God wants mankind to understand the Hebrew Bible. And, in accordance with standard Orthodox Jewish theology, he held that halakha, loosely translated as "Jewish law", is normative and binding on all Jews....held that halakha, loosely translated as "Jewish law", is normative and binding on all Jews.

=== Torah Umadda ===
One of Lamm's major contributions was as a proponent of the idea of "Torah Umadda" - "Torah and modern culture, or more generally, the environing culture of our days" - a philosophical paradigm which aims at the confrontation of Torah learning and secular knowledge. He argued that the underlying philosophy of Torah Umadda is inspired by the work of Rabbi Samson Raphael Hirsch in the mid 19th century in response to the Enlightenment. He states that Torah Umadda and Hirsch's Torah im Derech Eretz are to a large extent complementary - both value the acquisition of secular knowledge and both demand adherence to halakha.

=== Centrist Orthodoxy ===
Lamm was a well-known voice of "Modern Orthodoxy" (which is also known as Centrist Orthodoxy), regarding itself as the "center" between the "left-wing" branches of Orthodox Judaism, such as Rabbi Avi Weiss's "Open Orthodoxy," and "right-wing" movements such as Haredi Judaism. (Some writers have suggested a difference between the two terms "Modern" and "Centrist" Judaism — something Lamm dismissed as artificial.)

=== Relationship with non-Orthodox Judaism ===
Lamm was a strong critic of Reform Judaism's attempt to unilaterally redefine Jewishness. In response to their declaration that a person can be considered Jewish with only a Jewish father and not a Jewish mother (in contrast with Rabbinic Judaism's traditional stance that Judaism is passed on matrilineally, i.e., you are born Jewish if your mother is Jewish), Lamm stated that this was "The single most irresponsible act in contemporary Jewish history." Nonetheless, he has worked over the years to keep lines of communication open between Orthodox and Reform Judaism, in the hopes that Jewish unity can be maintained. Lamm was a proponent of working with Reform and Conservative Judaism in the now-defunct Synagogue Council of America.

In a lecture before Klal, a "mixed" group of rabbis, he maintained that non-Orthodox rabbis are "valid" spiritual leaders of their congregants, whereas the Orthodox are "legitimate" religious leaders. "Valid" comes from the Latin word validus which means powerful, strong–and they are certainly strong and influential Jewish leaders who should be respected for their efforts. But only Orthodox rabbis can lay claim to "legitimacy," a word which derives from Latin lex, law. Only one committed fully to the halakha can be considered Jewishly legitimate as a rabbi.

While strongly disagreeing with the theology and religious practices of non-Orthodox forms of Judaism, Lamm was one of the most outspoken leaders in Orthodoxy for cooperation with Conservative Judaism and Reform Judaism. In 1989 and 1990 Israeli Prime Minister Yitzhak Shamir asked Lamm to help defuse the crisis related to the "Who is a Jew?" issue, which had erupted when a Reform convert wanted to make aliyah (emigration to the State of Israel). Lamm devised a solution for the denominational crisis which required delicate diplomacy as well as goodwill on all sides. In response to Lamm's suggestion, Prime Minister Shamir appointed Israeli Cabinet Secretary Elyakim Rubenstein, later a member of the Supreme Court, who negotiated secretly for many months with rabbis from Conservative, Reform and Orthodox Judaism, including faculty at Yeshiva University, with Lamm as Rosh ha-Yeshiva. The plan called for the creation of a joint panel that interviewed people who were converting to Judaism and considering making aliyah (moving) to Israel, and would refer them to a beit din (rabbinic court of Judaism) that would convert the candidate following traditional halakha.

All negotiating parties came to an agreement that: (1) Conversions must be carried out according to halakha, (2) the beit din overseeing the conversion would be Orthodox, perhaps appointed by the Chief Rabbinate of Israel, and (3) there would be a committee consisting of representatives of all three groups to interview potential converts as to their sincerity. Many Reform rabbis took offense at the notion that the beit din must be strictly halakhic and Orthodox, but they acquiesced. However, when word about this project became public, a number of leading Haredi rabbis issued a statement denouncing the project, condemning it as a "travesty of halakha". Rabbi Moshe Sherer, then the Chairman of Agudath Israel World Organization, stated that "Yes, we played a role in putting an end to that farce, and I'm proud we did." Lamm condemned this interference by Sherer, stating that this was "the most damaging thing that he [Sherer] ever did in his brilliant forty-year career."

Lamm wanted this to be only the beginning of a solution to Jewish disunity. He stated that had this unified conversion plan not been destroyed, he wanted to extend this program to the area of halakhic Jewish divorces, thus ending the problem of mamzerut.

In 1997 the issue of "Who is a Jew?" again arose in the State of Israel, and Lamm publicly backed the Neeman Commission, a group of Orthodox, Conservative and Reform rabbis working to develop joint programs for conversion to Judaism. In 1997 he gave a speech at the World Council of Orthodox Leadership, in Glen Springs, New York, urging Orthodox Jews to support this effort.

Rabbi Lamm told his listeners that they should value and encourage the efforts of non-Orthodox leaders to more seriously integrate traditional Jewish practices into the lives of their followers. They should welcome the creation of Conservative and Reform day schools and not see them as a threat to their own. In many communities, Orthodox day schools, or Orthodox-oriented community day schools, have large numbers of students from non-Orthodox families. The liberal movements should be appreciated and encouraged because they are doing something Jewish, even if it is not the way that Orthodox Jews would like them to, he said. "What they are doing is something, and something is better than nothing," he said in his speech. "I'm very openly attacking the notion that we sometimes find in the Orthodox community that 'being a goy is better'" than being a non-Orthodox Jew, he said in an interview.

In his speech Seventy Faces, Lamm warns his listeners that there will be an "unbridgeable and cataclysmic rupture within the Jewish community" unless Jews from all the denominations, including Orthodoxy, listen to each other and try to find a way to work together. In this speech (now an essay) he rejects maximal ideas of religious pluralism, especially relativism. He denies that non-Orthodox Jews have halakhic legitimacy, explaining that their views on halakha do not have normative status. However, he goes on to affirm a moderate form of religious pluralism, and holds that Orthodox Jews must accept that non-Orthodox rabbis are valid Jewish leaders, and possess spiritual dignity. He holds that marriages that are officiated at by non-Orthodox Jews can be halakhically-valid if conducted in accordance with Jewish law, but not so non-Orthodox divorces (which require a beit din). Orthodox and non-Orthodox Jews must find ways to work together.

=== Views on abiogenesis, evolution and science ===
Originally trained as a scientist, Lamm maintained an interest in the interface between science and Judaism. In his 1971 essay "The religious implications of extraterrestrial life," Lamm writes about scientific developments concerning abiogenesis and evolution, the creation of life on Earth, and the then-developing scientific consensus that life could possibly evolve on other planets outside of the Solar System (i.e. extraterrestrial life). He writes:

... the fact remains that most of the highly respected scientists of our day, eminent in their fields, do believe that intelligent life exists elsewhere in the universe...

No religious position is loyally served by refusing to consider annoying theories which may well turn out to be facts. Torah is "a Torah of truth," and to hide from the facts is to distort that truth into a myth. Of course, it must be repeated that the theories here under discussion have not (yet) been established as true. But they may be: and Judaism will then have to confront them as it has confronted what men have considered the truth throughout the generations.

Maimonides, over eight centuries ago, was faced with the widely accepted Aristotelian theory of the eternity of the universe, which ostensibly contradicted the Biblical conception of creation in time. Maimonides demonstrated that Aristotle had not conclusively proved the eternity of matter and that since eternity and creation were philosophically equally acceptable alternatives, he preferred to accept creation since this theory was the one apparently taught in Genesis. Nevertheless, Maimonides averred, were the Aristotelian theory convincingly proven, he would have accepted it and reinterpreted the verses in Genesis to accommodate the theory of the eternity of matter.

It is this kind of position which honest men, particularly honest believers in God and Torah, must adopt at all times, and especially in our times. Conventional dogmas, even if endowed with the authority of an Aristotle – ancient or modern – must be tested vigorously. If they are found wanting, we need not bother with them. But if they are found to be substantially correct, we may not overlook them. We must then use the newly discovered truths the better to truly understand our Torah – the "Torah of truth."

Lamm's writings on this subject are prominently featured in the "What Is Out There?" featurette, on disk two of the two-disc special edition of 2001: A Space Odyssey. This featurette offers the views of various scientists and philosophers on the possibility of extraterrestrial life.

== Writings ==
Lamm was the author of 10 books, and edited or co-edited over 20 volumes.

In 1971 Lamm wrote Faith and Doubt: Studies in Traditional Jewish Thought, which was released in a second edition in 1986 and a third and up-dated edition in 2006. This book is a personal examination of his religious beliefs.

In the 1980s many in Modern Orthodox Judaism felt battered by criticism from Orthodoxy's theological right-wing. Many Orthodox Jews, notably HaRav Nissim Cahn, began to perceive Modern Orthodoxy as less compelling, and possibly less authentic, than Haredi Judaism. As such, Lamm wrote a principled theological defense of Modern Orthodoxy in Torah Umadda: The Encounter of Religious Learning and Worldly Knowledge in the Jewish Tradition and its theology of Torah in confrontation with Madda or "Western Civilization".

In 1989, his doctoral thesis examining the theological-kabbalistic differences in the Hasidic-Mitnagdic schism was published as Torah Lishmah: Torah for Torah's Sake in the Works of Rabbi Hayyim of Volozhin and His Contemporaries. Influences on Lamm came from both camps, with Rav Soloveitchik descended from Hayim Volozhin, main Mitnagdic theorist, who is compared with Hasidism's theorist Schneur Zalman of Liadi.

In accompaniment, in 1999 Lamm published The Religious Thought of Hasidism: Text and Commentary, which offered an in-depth development of formative Hasidic thought, the mystical teachings of the movement founded in the 18th century by the Baal Shem Tov. Through examination of primary sources, Lamm illustrates the development of Hasidic theology in the 18th and 19th centuries. The book won the National Jewish Book Award in Jewish Thought.

In 2000 Lamm wrote The Shema: Spirituality and Law in Judaism for a general audience not familiar with Jewish theology; this work focused on how a proper understanding of Judaism would lead a practitioner to spirituality. This work was a rejoinder to the viewpoint that religious, observant Judaism was dry and legal, as opposed to spiritual and meaningful.

In addition to these, Lamm has written many essays on contemporary Jewish issues which were published in the journals Tradition, founded in 1958 by Lamm, and the Journal of Halacha and Contemporary Society.

== Retirement ==
Lamm stepped down as president in 2003, and was succeeded by Richard Joel, who became the fourth President of Yeshiva University and the first layman to hold the office. Joel is a former attorney who also led the Bnai Brith's international Hillel student organization. Joel had previously been associate dean and professor at Yeshiva University's Cardozo Law School, and was an assistant district attorney in New York City.

Upon his retirement as president, Lamm was given the position of Chancellor of Yeshiva University. He maintained his title as Rosh HaYeshiva ("head of the yeshiva") of Yeshiva University's rabbinical school, RIETS for an additional ten years.

In July 2013, Lamm announced his retirement as chancellor and Rosh HaYeshiva after more than 60 years at Yeshiva University, and apologized for not responding more assertively when students at Yeshiva University High School for Boys said that two rabbis there had sexually abused them. After retirement Lamm left the spotlight of communal life. According to a family member Lamm suffered from an illness that affected his memory. Lamm died on May 31, 2020, in Englewood, New Jersey.

== Awards ==
1999: National Jewish Books Award in the Jewish Thought category for The Religious Thought of Hasidism: Text and Commentary

Academic offices
Preceded by Samuel Belkin	President of Yeshiva University; 1976 – 2003	Succeeded by Richard Joel
