= Jerzy Turonek =

Polish-Belarusian historian (1929–2019)

- Юры Туронак
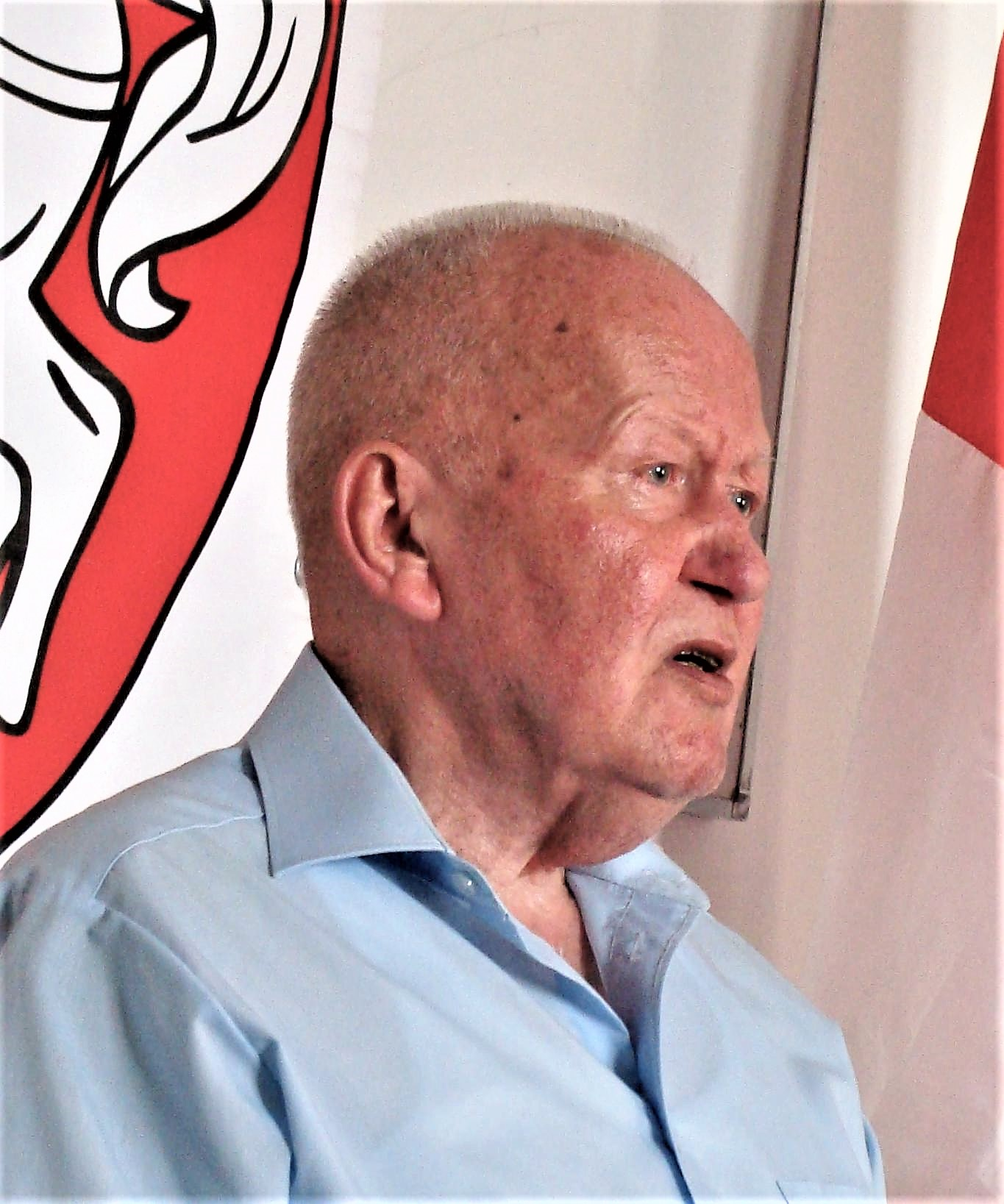
- Turonek at the Warsaw Collegium Civitas in 2010
- Born: 26 April 1929; Dūkštas, Wilno Voivodeship, Second Polish Republic (now in Utena County, Lithuania)
- Died: 2 January 2019 (aged 89); Warsaw, Poland
- Occupation: historian
- Known for: Studies of history of Belarus in the early 20th century and during the Second World War
- Awards: Belarusian Democratic Republic 100th Jubilee Medal (2018)

Jerzy Turonek (Belarusian: Юры Туронак, romanized: Yury Turonak; 26 April 1929 – 2 January 2019) was a Polish-Belarusian historian. He was born in Dūkštas into the family of West Belarusian political activist Branislaŭ Turonak in the Second Polish Republic's Wilno Voivodeship.

== Biography ==
After World War II, Turonek graduated from the Higher School for Planning and Statistics in Warsaw in 1952, and later worked for the Polish foreign trade chamber where he was analysing the international chemicals market and worked at the European economic commission in Geneva.

In the early 1960s, Turonek began researching the Belarusian national movement of the early 20th century, Polish-Belarusian relations in the 20th century, and the history of the Roman Catholic Church. In 1986, he became a Doctor of History. Turonek is the author of monograph Białoruś pod okupacją niemiecką (Belarus under the German occupation) published in 1993 by Książka i Wiedza. Copies of his monograph shipped to Belarus for distribution were confiscated by the KGB, the Belarusian security service.

== Works ==
- Białoruś pod okupacją niemiecką (Belarus under German occupation, Warsaw, 1993),
- Wacław Iwanowski i odrodzenie Białorusi (Vacłaŭ Ivanoŭski and the renaissance of Belarus, Warsaw, 1992),
- Książka białoruska w II Rzeczypospolitej 1921-1939 (Belarusian book publishing in the Second Polish Republic, Warsaw, 2000),
- Беларуская кніга пад нямецкім кантролем (1939-1944) (Belarusian book publishing under German control in 1939-1944, Minsk, 2002).
- Людзі СБМ (People GMS, Belarusian Youth Union)
