= Yaakov Bender =

American Haredi rabbi (born 1950)

Rabbi Yaakov Bender

Rosh HaYeshiva of Yeshiva Darchei Torah
- Incumbent
- Assumed office 1979

Personal life
- Born: 1950 (age 75–76) Brooklyn, New York, U.S.
- Spouse: Bryna Diskind (m. 1972)

Religious life
- Religion: Judaism
- Denomination: Haredi

Jewish leader
- Semikhah: Mirrer Yeshiva Central Institute

Yaakov Bender (born 1950) is an American Haredi rabbi who is the Rosh HaYeshiva of Yeshiva Darchei Torah in Far Rockaway, New York. He acts as a speaker, writer and adviser on Jewish education.

== Life and career ==
Bender was born in the Williamsburg neighborhood of Brooklyn, New York. His parents, Rabbi Dovid and Basia Bender, were pioneering educators on the American Jewish scene. His father was the head of Yeshiva Torah Vodaas in Brooklyn, New York. His paternal grandfather, Rabbi Avraham Bender, traveled in the 1930s within the United States to raise funds for yeshivas in New York such as Rabbi Isaac Elchanan Theological Seminary and Israel.

Bender started studying at the Talmudical Yeshiva of Philadelphia in 1965. He served as the branch leader of the Pirchei Youth Movement of Agudath Israel of America. He then studied at the Mirrer Yeshiva Central Institute, where he received semikhah in 1971. In 1973, he founded the Flatbush branch of Hatzalah, and was a member of the Central Board of Hatzalah for 20 years.

He was appointed as a seventh-grade rebbi (Hebrew teacher) at Yeshiva Darchei Torah in Far Rockaway in 1978, and six months later he was promoted to principal.

He is a member of the Vaad Roshei Yeshiva - the governing rabbinic board - of Torah Umesorah. In 1997 he was recognized as an outstanding Jewish educator by The Covenant Foundation.

In June 2026, Rabbi Bender was interviewed and profiled for an unprecedented cover story in Mishpacha Magazine.

== Opinions ==
Bender encouraged people to get the COVID-19 vaccine, saying "We haven't lived through enough?"

Following a 2018 New York Times article criticizing Haredi yeshiva education, Bender attacked the newspaper, calling the piece a "terrible and unfair attack" on yeshivos. He defended his students, stating their academic scores surpassed the New York average and their environment was superior to public schools due to the absence of drug use, crime, and disrespect.

== Personal life ==
Bender's father died suddenly in 1965, when he was 15. In 1972, he married Bryna Diskind, an educator.

Julius Berman was a cousin; the Bender family name was originally Berman. Julius Berman boarded with the Bender family in Williamsburg while attending high school circa 1950.

== Works ==
- Chinuch With Chessed (ArtScroll, 2013)
- Chinuch With Heart (ArtScroll, 2018)
- The Chinuch Haggadah (ArtScroll, 2019)
- Rav Yaakov Bender on Chumash (ArtScroll, 2021)
- Chinuch for Today (ArtScroll, 2022)
- Rav Yaakov Bender on Chumash Vol. 2 (ArtScroll, 2023)
- Chinuch With Simchah (ArtScroll, 2024)
- A Heart for Another (ArtScroll, 2024)
- Divrei Yaakov - Bereishis (Hebrew, Israel Bookshop Publications, 2025)
- Divrei Yaakov - Shemos (Hebrew, Israel Bookshop Publications, 2026)
