= Yeshiva Week =

Vacation period in mid to late January

Yeshiva Week is the informal term for a vacation period that occurs every year from mid to late January, in which many Jewish day schools and yeshivas afford time off for their students. It is primarily a North American phenomenon. This week is also held to avoid possible halachic issues with the typical American winter vacation held from Christmas to New Year's.

== Description ==
Yeshiva Week is spent largely the same way winter vacation is held in the broader American community. People have activities indoor and outdoor. Since adults are less likely to have time off from work that week, childcare is often left to non-working family members, such as grandparents and older siblings, or babysitters. Families who can afford the time off and travel go to various tourist destinations—which are traditionally in areas with warmer climates such as Florida, Israel, Arizona, Mexico, Panama, and the Caribbean. These places have a more "Jewish" environment than during the typical break times where it is much more cold.

== See also ==
- Winter vacation
