= BMP2K =

Protein-coding gene in the species Homo sapiens

Available structures
PDB	Ortholog search: PDBe RCSB
PDB	List of PDB id codes 4W9W, 4W9X, 5I3R, 5I3O, 5IKW

Identifiers
- Aliases: BMP2K, BIKE, HRIHFB2017, BMP2 inducible kinase
- External IDs: OMIM: 617648; MGI: 2155456; HomoloGene: 34134; GeneCards: BMP2K; OMA:BMP2K - orthologs

Gene location (Human)
Chr.	Chromosome 4 (human)
Band	4q21.21	Start	78,776,342 bp
Band	4q21.21	End	78,916,365 bp

Gene location (Mouse)
Chr.	Chromosome 5 (mouse)
Band	5|5 E3	Start	97,145,548 bp
Band	5|5 E3	End	97,239,726 bp
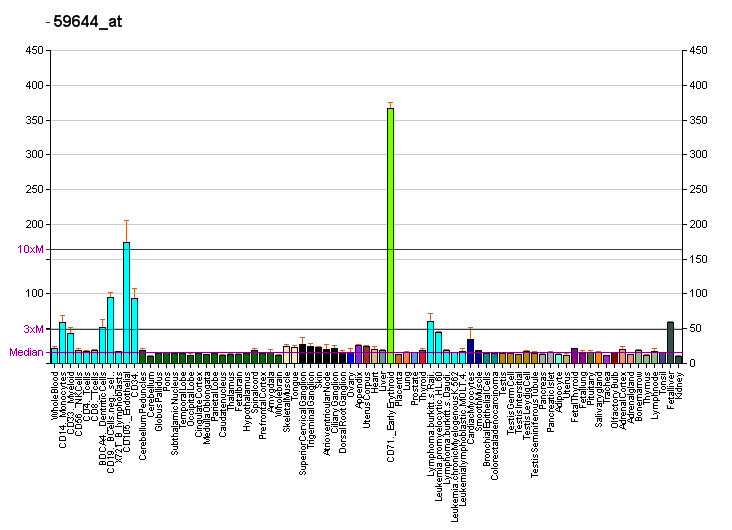

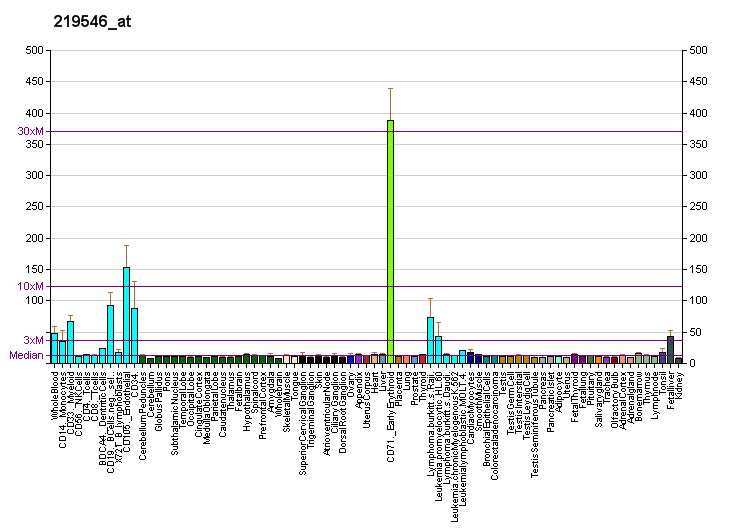

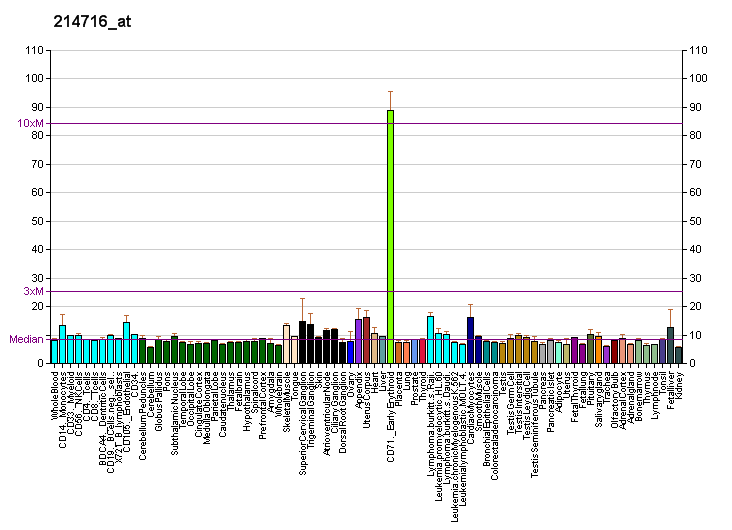
RNA expression pattern
Bgee	Human / Mouse (ortholog); Top expressed in: secondary oocyte; trabecular bone; sural nerve; rectum; monocyte; amniotic fluid; lymph node; appendix; Achilles tendon; stromal cell of endometrium / Top expressed in: secondary oocyte; zygote; blood; primary oocyte; spleen; decidua; mesenteric lymph nodes; granulocyte; hair follicle; epithelium of lens; More reference expression data
BioGPS	More reference expression data
Gene ontology
Molecular function	kinase activity; transferase activity; nucleotide binding; protein kinase activity; ATP binding; protein serine/threonine kinase activity; phosphatase regulator activity; AP-2 adaptor complex binding
Cellular component	nuclear speck; nucleus; cytoplasm
Biological process	regulation of catalytic activity; phosphorylation; regulation of bone mineralization; protein phosphorylation; positive regulation of Notch signaling pathway; regulation of clathrin-dependent endocytosis; regulation of endocytosis
Sources:Amigo / QuickGO
Orthologs
Species	Human	Mouse
Entrez	55589	140780
Ensembl	ENSG00000138756	ENSMUSG00000034663
UniProt	Q9NSY1	Q91Z96
RefSeq (mRNA)	NM_017593; NM_198892	NM_080708
RefSeq (protein)	NP_060063; NP_942595	NP_542439
Location (UCSC)	Chr 4: 78.78 – 78.92 Mb	Chr 5: 97.15 – 97.24 Mb
PubMed search
- Wikidata
View/Edit Human	View/Edit Mouse

BMP-2-inducible protein kinase is an enzyme in humans encoded by the BMP2K gene.

== Function ==
This gene is the human homolog of mouse BMP-2-inducible kinase. Bone morphogenic proteins (BMPs) play a key role in skeletal development and patterning. Expression of the mouse gene is increased during BMP-2 induced differentiation and the gene product is a putative serine/threonine protein kinase containing a nuclear localization signal. Therefore, the protein encoded by this human homolog is thought to be a protein kinase with a putative regulatory role in attenuating the program of osteoblast differentiation. Two transcript variants encoding different isoforms have been found for this gene.
