= Yeshiva Darchei Torah =

Jewish boys' school in Queens, New York, US

Coordinates: 40.596807°N 73.751635°W

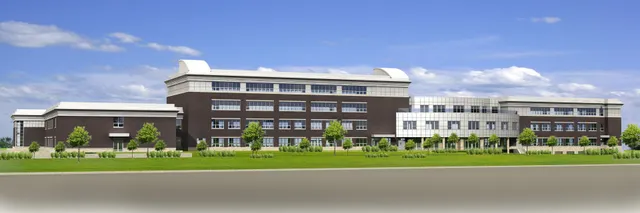

Location
- 257 Beach 17th St; Far Rockaway, Queens, New York; United States

Information
- Type: Private Orthodox Jewish yeshiva
- Religious affiliation: Orthodox Judaism
- Established: 1973
- Founder: Rabbi Yisroel Bloom
- President: Ronald Lowinger
- Director: Rabbi Joel Kaplan
- Menahels: Dr. Wendy Devorah Gerson (Director, Harriet Keilson Early Childhood Center) ·; Mrs. Yocheved Bender (Assistant Director, Harriet Keilson Early Childhood Center) ·; Mrs. Esti Feuer (Assistant Director, Harriet Keilson Early Childhood Center) ·; Mrs. Tzipi Fisher (Assistant Director, Harriet Keilson Early Childhood Center) ·; Rabbi Avrohom Bender (Menahel, Elementary Grade 3rd) ·; Rabbi Dovid Morgenstern (Menahel, Elementary Grades 4th and 5th) ·; Rabbi Shmuel Strickman (Menahel, Pre-1A and Elementary Grades 1st and 2nd) ·; Mrs. Ariella Kelman (Elementary General Studies Principal Grades 1st-4th) ·; Mrs. Sara Malka Krasnow (Elementary General Studies Assistant Principal Grades 1st-4th) ·; Rabbi Dovid Frischman (Menahel, Middle School Grades 6th and 7th) ·; Rabbi Avi Taub (Director of Simcha Day Camp - S’gan Menahel, Middle School Grades 6th and 7th) ·; Rabbi Moshe Leff (Principal General Studies, Middle School Grades 6th-8th and 5th Grade) ·; Rabbi Yitzchok Brailofsky (Assistant Principal General Studies, Grades 6th and 7th) ·; Rabbi Dovid Lan (Menahel, Mechina/8th Grade) ·; Rabbi Daniel Gavrielov (S’gan Menahel and Assistant General Studies Principal, Mechina/8th Grade) ·; Rabbi Zevi Trenk (Menahel, Mesivta Chaim Shlomo) ·; Rabbi Avrohom Nusbaum (Menahel, Mesivta Chaim Shlomo) ·; Rabbi Moishe Zeilengold (S’gan Menhael, Mesivta Chaim Shlomo) ·; Rabbi Daniel Schulman (S’gan Menahel, Mesivta Chaim Shlomo) ·; Rabbi Dov Keilson (Mashgiach Ruchani, Mesivta Chaim Shlomo) ·; Rabbi Yisroel Feder (Mashpia, Mesivta Chaim Shlomo) ·; Rabbi Shimon Dachs (General Studies Principal, Mesivta Chaim Shlomo - Director, Weiss Vocational Center) ·; Rabbi Chaim Yosef Olshan (Assistant Principal General Studies, Mesivta Chaim Shlomo) ·; Rabbi Shlomo Avigdor Altusky (Rosh Yeshiva, Beis Medrash Heichal Dovid) ·; Rabbi Dovid Geller (Mashgiach Ruchani, Beis Medrash Heichal Dovid) ·; Rabbi Dovid Bender (Rosh Kollel, Kollel Tirtza Devorah) ·; Mrs. Jill Kay (Director, Rabenstein Learning Center) ·
- Rosh HaYeshiva: Rabbi Yaakov Bender
- S’gan Rosh HaYeshiva: Rabbi Moshe Bender
- Grades: Nursery – post-high school seminary & married learning
- Gender: Male
- Enrollment: 2,500+
- Classes: 8 classes per grade (1-12th)
- Average class size: 20-30
- Language: English primary (Hebrew/Aramaic in Jewish studies)
- Campus size: 9.5 Acres
- Athletics conference: Metropolitan Yeshiva High School Athletic League (MYHSAL)
- Teams: Darchei Devils (Basketball)
- Website: Official website

Yeshiva Darchei Torah is a private Orthodox Jewish boys' school in Far Rockaway, Queens, New York, United States.

== History ==
The yeshiva was founded by Rabbi Yisroel Bloom and is headed by Rabbi Yaakov Bender, an award-winning educator. The yeshiva was established at its present location in the 1970s as a tenant of the Gustav Hartman YM-YWHA. It purchased the superblock property in 1991, subsequently constructing new buildings on the campus as the student body grew. The Yeshiva celebrated its 50th anniversary in 2023.

The school had 1,400 students in 2008 which later grew to over 2,500 enrolled students in pre-kindergarten through post-high school seminary.

On May 16, 2018, United States Secretary of Education Betsy DeVos became the first high-profile federal government official to visit a yeshiva, which was a two-day visit to Yeshiva Darchei Torah and to another school, a girls’ high school in Manhattan, called Manhattan High School for Girls. The visit was organized by the Agudath Israel of America organization.

In May 2024, Darchei Torah began construction on a new, 94,000-square-foot set of buildings that will include its first state-of-the-art residence hall, a new beis medrash (study hall) for its high school, and 15 classrooms.

On September 22, 2026, President of Argentina Javier Milei, part of his scheduled trip to New York City for the 81st Session of the UNGA, paid a visit to Yeshiva Darchei Torah and spoke to the yeshiva students and staff. He was presented the Ohev Yisrael Award by the Rosh HaYeshiva Yaakov Bender, In recognition of his staunch support for the Jewish people and Israel.

== Elementary ==
The school's lower grades have grade-appropriate studies for both religious and secular subjects, supplemented by a library and a schoolwide literacy program. While most students benefit from the school's STEM offerings, Darchei's "policy of inclusion for some special-needs children" makes its special education wing an important component.

== High school ==
Although the high school curriculum offers nine Advanced Placement classes and Regents exams, it also has "a vocational program for students who are struggling in a traditional academic program."

In June 2019, United States Ambassador to Israel David M. Friedman toured the yeshiva campus, including the Weiss Vocational Center, which had him in awe: "If I were still in yeshiva, I would be running to this very special and educational program, it's really a special thing and a big Kiddush Hashem".

The upper grade unit, which is named Mesivta Chaim Shlomo of Yeshiva Darchei Torah, encourages its students to participate in the science competition that is a part of the Center for Initiatives in Jewish Education (CJIE).

== Senior divisions ==
The school also comprises a post-high school rabbinical college, Beis Medrash Heichal Dovid, and a postgraduate kollel, Kollel Tirtza Devorah, for married scholars.

=== Student body ===
Despite the school's Ashkenaz orientation, it serves a growing population of Sephardic families as well, offers a weekly Sephardic minyan (prayer service), and hosts annual visits of a Sephardic rabbi, Yaakov Moshe Hillel, who has been visiting Darchei since 2004.

== Name ==
The words Darchei Torah mean "Paths of Torah."

There are other institutions using the same name in many different locations, although these are not affiliate with the Darchei Torah in Far Rockaway.

== See also ==
- Mesivta
