= Aaron Klein =

American journalist

- אהרון קליין
- Born: 1979 (age 46–47); United States
- Education: Yeshiva University
- Occupations: Talk radio host, author, political advisor
- Political party: Likud

Aaron Klein (Hebrew: אהרון קליין; born 1979) is an American-Israeli conservative political commentator, journalist, strategist, bestselling author, and senior advisor to Prime Minister Benjamin Netanyahu. He served as campaign manager for several of Netanyahu's election campaigns and chief strategist for Netanyahu's 2020 election campaign that resulted in a rotating unity government with Netanyahu at the helm and his 2022 campaign in which Netanyahu won a full-term. Klein was Netanyahu's full-time strategic advisor in government from 2020 to 2021, during the period Netanyahu was prime minister of Israel's 36th government and he serves as a strategic advisor to Netanyahu during Israel's 37th government.

Klein played a role in Donald Trump's 2016 presidential campaign. He was previously an American weekend radio talk show host, author, and senior reporter and Middle Eastern bureau chief for Breitbart News and a weekly columnist for The Jewish Press.

== Early life and education ==
Klein grew up in Philadelphia and graduated from Torah Academy Boys High School. In his book Schmoozing with Terrorists, Klein describes his upbringing: "I was a Talmud-studying Modern Orthodox Jew. I attended Jewish religious schooling my entire life from religious elementary school until college. I came from a tight-knit orthodox Jewish community."

At Yeshiva University in New York City, Klein edited the undergraduate bimonthly student newspaper The Commentator and changed his major from biology to English upon becoming editor. "After determining that the publication was decidedly underwhelming in journalistic ambition—'a glorified synagogue newsletter,' Klein called it—he tried to up the paper's metabolism by publishing a series of articles that were highly critical of the school administration," according to a book by New York Times reporter Jeremy Peters.

Articles published in The Commentator regarding events such as use of an eight-million-dollar gift to the school and the removal of a secretary, written while Klein was a co-editor in chief, allegedly caused the school administration to remove some issues from circulation. This prompted the paper's editorial board to threaten to sue the university, generating national media attention. Yeshiva University later signed a contract with Klein in which it agreed to discontinue the practice and reimburse The Commentator for the confiscated issues.

== Work for Netanyahu ==
In 2019, Klein advised Israeli Prime Minister Netanyahu while the premier was preparing a public campaign against the Israeli attorney general's decision to indict him.

Klein was chief strategist for Netanyahu's December 2019 Likud leadership primary in which Netanyahu scored a landslide victory.

Klein then served as chief strategist for Netanyahu's third successive general election after two previous elections failed to produce a clear majority government. Netanyahu's Likud party won more votes than any party in Israeli electoral history, with Likud crediting Klein's strategy for historic turnout from its voters. At his campaign's nationally televised "victory" event, Netanyahu publicly credited Klein with his victory in the March 2020 election, which produced a unity government in which Netanyahu would serve as prime minister for 18 months.

In June 2020, Netanyahu hired Klein as a full-time strategic advisor. "Klein left a full-time successful career as a reporter to help as Israel finds itself facing unprecedented challenges during the coronavirus pandemic, amid the international debate on the issue of applying sovereignty [in the West Bank] and other pressing matters," the Likud stated.

Klein served as Netanyahu's strategist during the period that Netanyahu signed four peace deals with Arab nations and oversaw Israel's successful corona vaccine program.

Following his hiring, Klein was described in Israeli media reports as one of Netanyahu's closest advisors and he is referred to in Hebrew media outlets as "Bibi whisperer," using Netanyahu's nickname.

Netanyahu appointed Klein as campaign manager and chief of his March 2021 election campaign. "Klein is one of the most talented strategists we ever worked with and he is tirelessly dedicated to safeguarding the State of Israel," Jonatan Urich, a Likud party spokesman, said. Klein served as strategic advisor to Netanyahu during the 2022 election, in which Netanyahu won a decisive victory. Klein serves as a strategic advisor to Netanyahu during Netanyahu's 6th term in office.

== Trump 2016 presidential campaign ==
Steve Bannon, chief strategist for Donald Trump's 2016 presidential campaign, credited Klein with being the "genius" who came up with the idea of bringing Bill Clinton's female sexual assault accusers to a presidential debate held in St. Louis, Missouri, in October 2016 between Trump and Hillary Clinton. The debate took place as Trump was facing mounting pressure to step down following the release of the Access Hollywood tape in which Trump was caught on camera making controversial statements about women. Klein's strategy to bring Clinton's accusers to the debate and sit them in the front row across from him and facing Hillary Clinton on stage was widely reported as helping to turn Trump's campaign around at that time and regain the narrative.

An article in The New York Times documented how Trump defused the Access Hollywood furor with Klein not only strategizing but physically bringing the Clinton assault accusers to the debate and surprising the media:

The stunt came about thanks to a "norm-shattering" partnership between the Trump campaign and Aaron Klein, a 36-year-old reporter for Bannon's website, Breitbart News, who tracked down the women and cajoled them into attending.

"In the history of modern presidential politics, no candidate had pulled off such a ruthless act of vengeance in public," New York Times reporter Jeremy Peters added. "It changed the game, proving to Trump and his allies that there was nothing off-limits anymore." The Times continued:

So pivotal was Klein's role in Trump’s upset victory that Jared Kushner later told him, "My father-in-law wouldn't be president without you."

== Media career ==
After several years working as the Jerusalem bureau chief for WorldNetDaily, Klein served as senior reporter and Jerusalem bureau chief for Breitbart News. He was recruited to that position by former Trump chief strategist Steve Bannon, who served as executive chairman of Breitbart News. Klein also had a weekly column in the Jewish Press.

Klein hosted a weekly radio program, Aaron Klein Investigative Radio on Salem Media Group-owned conservative talk stations, WNYM in the New York City area and WNTP in Philadelphia. The program previously aired on WABC in New York until early 2014. His show included his calling and interviewing terrorists on the air. "Aaron Klein Investigative Radio" annually made Talker's "Heavy Hundred" list of top American weekend radio programs, considered the standard for talk radio ratings. His program was one of two weekend programs in the U.S. that made the list most years. The show was reported to have over one million weekly listeners. In January 2013, the show claimed it was the most-listened-to AM talk show radio on the weekend.

A Jerusalem Post magazine profile, describing Klein as a "one-man power house", quoted the radio host on why he thinks covering the U.S. while living in Tel Aviv is advantageous. "I have a major advantage being in Israel," Klein told the newspaper. "For example when a child is raised in a dysfunctional household, sometimes he doesn't realize the reality of the situation until he leaves and takes a look at things from the outside. Being here in Israel I have the advantage of exploring U.S. politics with a proper perspective, where I can see things far more clearly."

== Interviews ==
During the 2016 U.S. presidential election, Klein conducted a series of interviews with the sexual assault accusers of Bill Clinton: Juanita Broaddrick, Gennifer Flowers, Paula Jones and Kathleen Willey. The allegations become fodder for the presidential debates and the news cycle. Hours before the third presidential debate, former Arkansas television reporter Leslie Millwee gave her first public interview with Klein at Breitbart News, claiming Clinton sexually assaulted her in 1980.

In April 2008, Klein appeared on the John Batchelor radio show, where both interviewed Ahmed Yousef, chief political adviser to Hamas in the Gaza Strip. During that interview, Yousef stated that Hamas endorsed Barack Obama for president. The interview became a theme of the 2008 presidential campaign. Republican candidate John McCain and Obama themselves addressed Yousef's comments; McCain quoted Yousef's comments dozens of times during media interviews.

As per Buzzfeed: "It's been a tradition for the past several American elections: At some point, Aaron Klein calls leaders of the Palestinian group Hamas, they tell him they're supporting the Democrat, and he goes with a headline along the lines of: 'Mideast terror leaders to U.S.: Vote Democrat.'"

During a June 2007 interview, after an argument during a radio interview over whether or not Hamas was a terrorist organization, British politician George Galloway evicted Klein from his office and turned him over to Parliament police, claiming he had breached security by falsely presenting himself as a reporter and that Klein was really a "Zionist agent".

In June 2010, Imam Faisal Abdul Rauf, the Muslim leader behind a proposed Islamic cultural center near the site of the 9-11 attacks, was interviewed by Klein on WABC, where he reportedly refused to describe Hamas as a terrorist organization.

On August 15, 2010, Mahmoud al-Zahar, the chief of Hamas in Gaza, appeared on Klein's program, where he expressed support for Park51 community center. Zahar's comments made the cover of the New York Post and generated world media attention.

== Books ==
=== Schmoozing with Terrorists ===
Klein's book Schmoozing with Terrorists: From Hollywood to the Holy Land, Jihadists Reveal their Global Plans – to a Jew! was released in September 2007.

The book, a bestseller, is based on interviews with purported terrorists. Topics include Klein's meetings with a recruited Palestinian suicide bomber; interviews with Muhammed Abdel-El, the head of a Popular Resistance Committee, and Hamas leader Sheikh Yasser Hamad; and confrontations with the Muslim desecrators of Jewish and Christian holy sites. There is also a section in which jihadist leaders are petitioned to describe what life in the U.S. would be like under the rule of Islam, a chapter on Christian persecution in the Middle East, and a chapter claiming the U.S. funds terrorism.

=== The Manchurian President ===
The Manchurian President: Barack Obama's Ties to Communists, Socialists and Other Anti-American Extremists was released in May 2010. In the book (per The New York Times blurb), "President Obama's life and campaigns are sifted for Communist and socialist ties." The book was on the New York Times' bestseller list for hardcover nonfiction as well as those of Publishers Weekly and The Washington Post. Simon Maloy, writing for Media Matters for America, and John Oswald, of the New York Daily News, both called the book "ridiculous crap". Some journalists, including from publications such as Time and Newsweek, sent emails to the author's publicist saying they did not want to receive a review copy of Klein's book.

=== Red Army ===
Red Army: The Radical Network That Must Be Defeated to Save America was published in October 2011. The book was reviewed by Michael Tomasky for the New York Review of Books, writing "I can't in good conscience recommend that anyone read 'Red Army' except perhaps the president," noting that the book "will be read by hundreds of thousands."

=== Fool Me Twice ===
Fool Me Twice: Obama's Shocking Plans for the Next Four Years Exposed was released on August 7, 2012, and appeared on The New York Times bestseller list the following week.

=== Impeachable Offenses ===
In August 2013, Klein published Impeachable Offenses: The Case to Remove Barack Obama from Office. MSNBC reported the book fueled the national conversation to impeach Obama, while BuzzFeed announced the book "ushers in the Obama impeachment movement" on the right.

=== Real Benghazi Story ===
On September 11, 2014, the second anniversary of the Benghazi attacks, Klein released a new book entitled, The REAL Benghazi Story: What the White House and Hillary Don’t Want You to Know.

Maggie Haberman reported in Politico that the book was part of a resurgence of conservative book publishing targeting Clinton in the run-up to the United States presidential election in 2016. Alex Seitz-Wald, writing for MSNBC, said the book would prove "easy fodder for the conservative echo chamber".

== Relationship with Wikipedia ==
In March 2009, Klein criticized Wikipedia for what he described as preferential treatment of Barack Obama coverage. Klein said that Wikipedia editors had scrubbed the article of material critical of the president and that an editor had been suspended for attempting to add "missing" details about Obama's relationship with Bill Ayers and allegations that Obama was not born in the United States. Klein said similar negative content was found in the article of George W. Bush.

The story was picked up by The Independent, The Daily Telegraph, Drudge Report and Fox News. A spokesperson for Wikipedia stated that the Obama article had not received any preferential treatment.

Klein removed the name of the editor from the article after reports arose on blogs and Wired News that he might himself be the suspended editor described in the story (the editor's only previous work on Wikipedia was editing Klein's page). In an email sent in response to the Wired News article, Klein wrote that the editor "works with me and does research for me."
