= Stone Beit Midrash Program =

Yeshiva University is an institution that strives to produce well rounded Jewish students by providing them with a dual curriculum in both Torah studies and General knowledge. In the undergraduate men’s program there are four Torah studies tracks, in order to properly serve a diverse student population. One of them is the Irving I. Stone Beit Midrash Program, referred to as “BMP”. In addition there are three others: JSS (James Striar School), IBC (Isaac Breuer College), and MYP (Mazer School of Talmudic Studies). JSS is geared towards, “those new to Hebrew language and textual study who want to attain a broad-based Jewish philosophical and text education.” IBC is geared towards students who wish to study seriously but in a classroom setting. MYP, the most rigorous of the four programs, is for those seeking the deepest exposure to traditional learning.

With funding from the Irving I. Stone Support Foundation BMP was established in 1995. It is geared towards students who are not interested “in a classical yeshiva approach”, which gives the most rigorous deep exposure in a Yeshiva setting that the Mazer School of Talmudic Studies (known as “YP”) has to offer but rather desire more flexible chavruta (study partner)/shiur (lecture) options. The goal of this program, “is to create educated and committed Jewish lay leaders” whose breadth of knowledge spans the gamut of Jewish disciplines such as: Talmud, Tanakh, Jewish Law, and Jewish thought.

== Curriculum ==
The program has about 300 students divided into nine classes (shiurim) ranging in level from beginner to advanced. As part of the curriculum students are taught both Tanakh and Jewish Law twice a week. "Tanakh study revolves around central stories and themes, as expounded by the classic commentaries. By the completion of their time in BMP students will have completed the entire Neviim Rishonim (Early Prophets.)

The curriculum of Jewish Law covers the range of the basic laws students will need in their daily life, including the laws of Shabbat, Kashrut, family law, and synagogue, among others. On Sundays students are taught Jewish Thought. Besides for all of the elements of the curriculum already mentioned the most central focus of the program is on Talmud study. Students first study with a partner (chavruta) in the Beit Midrash (learning center) and subsequently hear a lecture (shiur) by an experienced Talmud scholar; the Rabbi. Students are required to purchase the Talmudic Tractate which is being studied in any given year. In addition to their morning studies requirements, BMP students can also opt into an optional learning program on Monday through Wednesday night.

== Schedule ==
Monday-Thursday

9:00–10:20 Tanakh/Jewish Law

10:30–11:40 Sikha (Inspirational Lecture)/ Morning Seder (study time with a partner independent of the Instructor)

11:45–12:55 Talmud Lecture

1:00–2:30 Lunch, Hebrew/Bible Classes

3:00–8:00 College courses and dinner

8:15–10:00 Night Seder (study time with a partner) in Harry Fischel Beit Midrash (Learning Center)

Sunday

10:00–11:40 Talmudic Lecture

== Faculty and staff ==
The BMP faculty consists of three distinct categories. First of all there is the overall heads of all the undergraduate Torah Studies program’s in Yeshiva University, which includes BMP. Each class (shiur) in BMP has a warm Rabbi/teacher who provides the main instruction for the class while also forming a close relationship with the students. In addition each class (Shiur) has a Sho'eil U'meishiv (Teachers Assistant) who is available to discuss the topic being studied in order to help the students prepare for class (shiur). These Teacher Assistants also contribute towards the warm BMP environment.

Heads of the Undergraduate Torah Studies at Yeshiva University

Rabbi Menachem Penner-The Max and Marion Grill Dean

Rabbi Yosef Kalinsky-Associate Dean

Rebbeim/Teachers

Rabbi Eli Belizon, Rabbi Aharon Ciment, Rabbi Meir Goldwicht, Rabbi Daniel Rapp, Rabbi Eitan Schnall, Rabbi Moshe Tzvi Weinberg

== Student perspectives: BMP in practice ==
While BMP has certain theoretical goals, as mentioned above, in practice, BMP means something different to various elements of the student body. To many students BMP is a program filled with warmth, excitement, and a serious commitment to learning Jewish topics. One student commented, “The warmth that the Rebbeim in the program provide is unmatched, and the chevrah (group of friends) that are created through that warmth last a lifetime.” This same student extolled the serious commitment to Jewish studies that BMP students take upon themselves, manifested by the night learning program from Monday through Wednesday night which many choose to join. Students like this one perceive BMP as an equal alternative to the Mazer School of Talmudic Studies in terms of commitment and seriousness to Judaism and the study of Jewish topics. These students simply chose BMP over the Mazer School of Talmudic Studies because they value the warm relationship that BMP offers to its students. They reject the notion that BMP is a less serious program as compared to the Mazer School of Talmudic Studies.

However, other students do not see things in the same light. Over the years there has been a controversy regarding the placement of different morning programs in the various learning centers. BMP used to learn in its own Beit Midrash (learning center) in Furst Hall. In recent years they have been relocated into the Glueck and Fischel Batei Midrash (learning centers), joining the students from the Mazer School of Talmudic Studies. While many BMP students laud this relocation to what President Joel has termed the “[h]eart of our Yeshiva,” (the Glueck and Fischel learning centers) many of the students in the Mazer School of Talmudic Studies are unhappy with these new developments. A particularly passionate student remarked that “[t]he learning of YP students (Mazer School of Talmudic studies students) would be best if they were surrounded by equally motivated and strong Torah learners.” This student’s opinion, contrary to the view mentioned above, is that BMP lacks the level of seriousness and commitment to Torah that the Mazer School of Talmudic Studies has to offer.

This perspective on BMP is exacerbated by policy changes in regards to the Jewish studies requirements. Previously BMP students, similar to their Mazer School of Talmudic Studies counterparts, did not have the option to fulfil any of their Jewish studies requirements as part of their morning studies. Rather they were expected to spend the whole morning in the Beit Midrash (learning center). In recent years, BMP students have been given the opportunity to take a Bible course twice a week during part of the morning in order to fulfil an element of their Jewish studies requirements. This new development has left many concerned that the seriousness of the Beit Midrash (learning center) will be diminished as students come and go during the morning studies. Yet, not all students take such a negative view of such changes. One student claimed that “the new morning structure, which allows for seniors to take a Bible class in the morning, allows for students to allocate their morning studies more efficiently, making the most of their time both in the Beis Medresh and in the classroom.”
