= Yeshiva College (Yeshiva University) =

University College of Yeshiva University

Coordinates: 40.8505°N 73.92945°W

Yeshiva College is located in New York City’s Washington Heights neighborhood in Upper Manhattan. It is Yeshiva University’s undergraduate college of liberal arts and sciences for men. (Stern College for Women is Yeshiva College’s counterpart for women.) The architecture reflects a search for a distinctly Jewish style appropriate to American academia.

Roughly 1,100 students from some two dozen countries, including students registered at Syms School of Business, attend Yeshiva College.

On July 27, 2009, it was announced that Barry L. Eichler would succeed David J. Srolovitz as dean of Yeshiva College.

== Philosophy ==
Students at Yeshiva College pursue a dual educational program that combines liberal arts and sciences and pre-professional studies with the study of Torah and Jewish heritage, reflecting Yeshiva’s educational philosophy of Torah Umadda, which translates loosely as "Torah and secular knowledge" (the interaction between Judaism and general culture).

== Academics ==
Majors offered include:

- Biochemistry
- Biology
- Chemistry
- Classical languages
- Computer sciences
- Economics
- English
- Finance
- General Business
- Hebrew
- History
- Jewish studies
- Management
- Mathematics
- Music
- Philosophy
- Physics
- Political science
- Pre-engineering
- Psychology
- Sociology
- Speech and drama

Combined and joint programs in business administration, dentistry, engineering, Jewish education, Jewish studies, law, occupational therapy, optometry, podiatric medicine, and social work are also available.

Minors offered include:

- American studies
- Architecture
- Art
- Biology
- Business
- Chemistry
- Classical languages
- Computer sciences
- Economics
- English (Literature and Writing tracks)
- Hebrew
- History
- Jewish studies
- Mathematics
- Music
- Philosophy
- Physics
- Political science
- Psychology
- Public health
- Sociology
- Spanish
- Speech and drama

The Robert M. Beren Department of Jewish Studies unifies and centralizes all academic Jewish studies offerings at Yeshiva College: Bible, Hebrew, Jewish history, Jewish philosophy, and Judaic studies.

In addition to courses leading to the B.A. degree, all students undertake Jewish studies requiring intensive analysis of classic texts in Hebrew and Aramaic. Students are enrolled in a full course of study in one of the following options:

- James Striar School of General Jewish Studies/the Mechinah Program
- Yeshiva Program/Mazer School of Talmudic Studies
- Isaac Breuer College of Hebraic Studies
- Irving I. Stone Beit Midrash Program

Yeshiva College's Jay and Jeanie Schottenstein Honors program stresses writing, critical analysis, cultural enrichment, and individual mentoring.

The S. Daniel Abraham Israel Program allows students who wish to spend a year in Israel to take courses at one of 51 different Israeli institutions.

== Student life ==
Athletics include Maccabees basketball, tennis, fencing, cross-country, golf, soccer, volleyball, wrestling, and baseball. Other student activities include the newspaper The Commentator and the radio station WYUR.

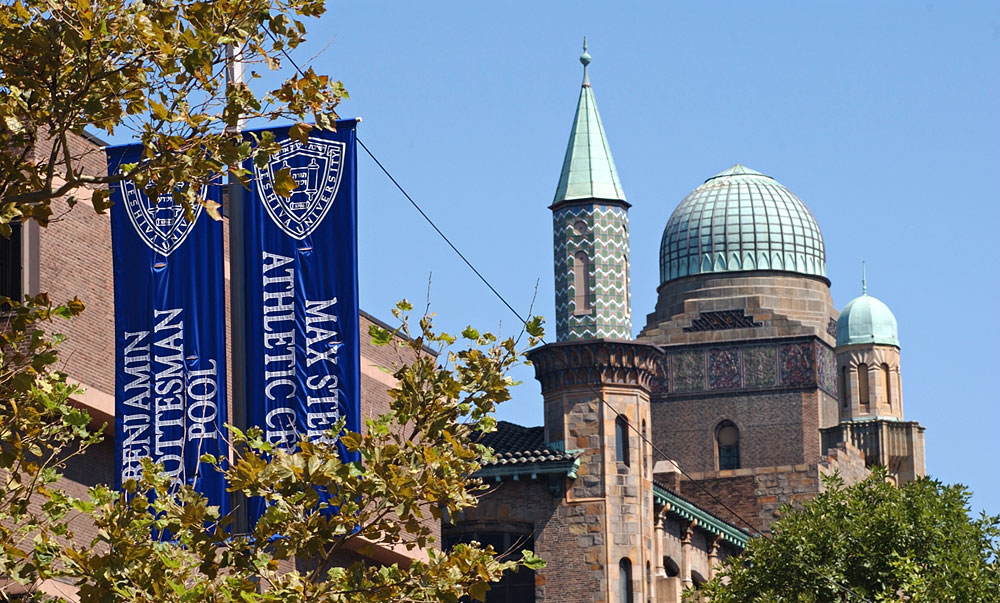
David H. Zysman Hall, on the Washington Heights campus of Yeshiva College, is home to one of the main batei midrash (study halls).

=== Student government ===
The student government includes the Yeshiva College Student Association (YCSA), the Yeshiva Student Union (YSU), the Student Organization of Yeshiva and Judaic Studies Programs (SOY/JSC), and the Syms School Of Business Student Association.

=== Dormitories and student housing ===
Approximately 90% of the undergraduate student population(s) lives on campus.

The Wilf Campus includes three main dormitory buildings: Morgenstern, Muss, and Rubin Residence Halls. Many upperclassmen live in the surrounding independent housing that is run by the university or in other nearby buildings.

== Notable alumni ==
- Rabbi Chaim Brovender
- Shaye Cohen
- Hillel Furstenberg
- Hillel Goldberg
- Ari Goldman
- Louis Henkin
- Aaron Klein, author and chief strategist for Prime Minister Benjamin Netanyahu
- Daniel Kurtzer, former United States Ambassador to Israel and Egypt
- Rabbi Norman Lamm
- Matthew Levitt
- Nathan Lewin
- Rabbi Albert L. Lewis
- Josef Mandelbaum, CEO of American Greetings
- Irving Miller, American Jewish Zionist leader
- Chaim Potok
- Rabbi Shlomo Riskin
- Gary Rosenblatt
- Henry Siegman
- Shlomo Sternberg
- Alan E. Willner

== Notable faculty ==
- Joseph B. Soloveitchik
- Adam Zachary Newton

== Facilities ==
The campus is centered on the area of Amsterdam Ave and West 185th Street (Yeshiva University's main office is 500 185th St). The buildings in the campus are:

- David H. Zysman Hall
- Sol and Hilda Furst Hall
- Belfer Hall
- Schottenstein Center
- Mendel Gottesman Library
- Max Stern Athletic Building and Benjamin Gottesman Pool
- Ruth and Hyman Muss, Morris and Celia Morgenstern, Joseph and Dora Strenger, and Leah and Joseph Rubin Residence Halls
- Glueck Center for Jewish Studies

== See also ==
- List of Jewish universities and colleges in the United States
- Yeshiva College (disambiguation)
