= BMP =

BMP may refer to:

== Computing ==
- Basic Multilingual Plane, related to the Unicode character set
- BMP file format, an image file format with the extension .bmp
- Beep Media Player, an obsolete media player related to XMMS
- BGP Monitoring Protocol (RFC 7854), a network protocol for monitoring BGP sessions
- BMP, a Billing Mediation Platform used mainly in telecom industry

== Media, business, politics, places, transportation, and armies ==
These topics have substantial overlap within these entries, and are ordered accordingly.

- BMP Radio, a broadcasting company based in Houston, Texas
- Boase Massimi Pollitt, a former advertising agency in the UK
- Bukluran ng Manggagawang Pilipino, a Philippine trade union organization
- BMP Global Distribution Inc v Bank of Nova Scotia, a 2008–2009 case in the Supreme Court of Canada
- Bruhat Bengaluru Mahanagara Palike (BMP or BBMP), municipal corporation for the city of Bengaluru, India
- Bull Moose Project, an American nonprofit organization
- British Mandate Palestine, geopolitical entity from 1920 to 1948
- Bear Mountain Parkway, a scenic parkway in New York State that connects the Bear Mountain Bridge with Peekskill
- Baoding East railway station, China Railway telegraph code BMP
- BMP development, a series of Soviet and Russian infantry fighting vehicles
  - BMP-1
  - BMP-2
  - BMP-3
- BMP-23, a Bulgarian infantry fighting vehicle
- Besi Merah Putih, a militia group in East Timor

== Medicine and biology ==
- Basic metabolic panel, a common blood test
- Bone morphogenetic proteins, a family of growth factors influencing bone and tissue growth within animals

== Other uses ==
- Best management practice for water pollution, a technical term in environmental management
- Stone Beit Midrash Program, an undergraduate Judaic Studies program at Yeshiva University
