= Sy Syms School of Business =

Business school of Yeshiva University

Coordinates: 40.85126°N 73.93064°W

- Motto: Developing Torah-grounded professionals who excel in the workplace and in the community
- Type: Private business school
- Established: 1987; 39 years ago
- Parent institution: Yeshiva University
- Dean: Michael Strauss
- Location: New York City, US
- Website: www.yu.edu/syms/

Sy Syms School of Business is Yeshiva University's business school. It offers undergraduate and graduate business programs at the Wilf Campus in New York's Washington Heights neighborhood, and at the Beren Campus in New York's Murray Hill neighborhood.

The school offers a complete business curriculum, affording preparation with a base in liberal arts studies.

== Background ==
The school was established in 1987 through a $22 million endowment from businessman and philanthropist Sy Syms and other business leaders.

The school offers a business curriculum along with a Jewish studies component for undergraduates. Jewish tradition provides the framework for consideration of ethical issues in classes. All undergraduate Sy Syms students are required to attend one of the four schools of Jewish studies.

It is accredited as a business school by the Association to Advance Collegiate Schools of Business.

== Campus and facilities ==
The main building on Wilf Campus is the 235-foot tall Belfer Hall that was originally built in 1968 for the use of Wurzweiler School of Social Work & Bernard Revel Graduate School of Jewish Studies, but is now shared by the three schools and university administrative offices. Belfer Hall, named for philanthropists Diane and Arthur Belfer, is one of the tallest educational structures in the world. The school's students live in the surrounding residence halls of Yeshiva University. Students can also workout at the Syms Fitness Center located in Rubin Hall.

The graduate programs take place in the university's midtown Beren Campus located in Murray Hill. Three of the programs are now offered online.

== Academics ==
Undergraduate students take business courses through the Sy Syms School of Business and complete their liberal arts requirements at Yeshiva College or Stern College for Women. Women undertake their Jewish studies at Stern, while men attend one of four Jewish studies options:

- James Striar School of General Jewish Studies/Mechinah Program
- Yeshiva Program/Mazer School of Talmudic Studies
- Isaac Breuer College of Hebrew Studies
- Irving I. Stone Beit Midrash Program

Majors and minors offered include accounting (an optional 5-year program leading to a B.S/M.S. in accounting); finance; general business; international business; management; management information systems; and marketing. The accounting program was recently ranked by Business Insider as a top 25 accounting program to attend based on job placement for graduates.

A general business minor is offered to students majoring in Yeshiva University's liberal arts college, Yeshiva College. Additionally, Syms students may be able to pursue a minor in a subject area in Yeshiva College.

The school offers a selection of honors courses and honors programs.

== Graduate programs ==
Sy Syms also offers graduate programs including a Master of Science in Accounting and an Executive MBA Program. Its graduate business programs are held at the Beren Campus in New York's Murray Hill neighborhood.

The EMBA offers students business knowledge in the context of ethical ideals. The Syms Executive MBA program curriculum was developed to prepare student for future professional work. In the summer of 2013, the first EMBA cohort traveled to Israel as part of their international residency requirement.

== Entrepreneurship ==
The Sy Syms School of Business maintains a strong focus on entrepreneurship.

- The Rennert Entrepreneurial Institute is an undergraduate program teaching the knowledge and skills necessary for creating and developing a business. The undergraduate program uses classroom instruction and hands-on experience to teach about starting and managing a business. Students may take entrepreneurship courses as electives or as an integral part of the management concentration. The institute received its initial funding through a grant from Mr. and Mrs. Ira Rennert, for whom the institute is named.
- The Doris and Dr. Ira Kukin Entrepreneurial Lecture Series allows students to interact with prominent CEOs and other business experts.
