= Ferkauf Graduate School of Psychology =

Division of Yeshiva University

Coordinates: 40.851101°N 73.850253°W

The Ferkauf Graduate School of Psychology is a division of Yeshiva University. Along with the Albert Einstein College of Medicine, it is located at the Louis E. and Doris Rousso Community Health Center on Yeshiva University’s Jack and Pearl Resnick Campus in the Bronx, New York.

As of 2023, the dean of Ferkauf is Leslie Helpern.

== Academics ==
Ferkauf offers the following degrees:

- M.A. in Mental Health Counseling
- M.S. in Marriage and Family Therapy
- Psy.D. in Clinical Psychology
- Psy.D. in School-Clinical Child Psychology
- Ph.D. in Clinical Psychology w/Health Emphasis

A joint program with the Albert Einstein College of Medicine offers doctoral research opportunities in clinical health psychology.

Since 1985, the Psy.D. in Clinical Psychology program is accredited by the American Psychological Association (APA).

== Facilities and programs ==
- The Rose F. Kennedy Center for Research in Mental Retardation and Developmental Disabilities provides interdisciplinary training.
- The Leonard and Murial Marcus Family Project for the Study of the Disturbed Adolescent supports fellowships and research in adolescent psychology, emphasizing treatment of depression.
- The Max and Celia Parnes Family Psychological and Psychoeducational Services Clinic offers assessment and therapeutic services for neighboring communities.
- The Beker Family Project trains school psychologists to work within Hebrew day schools and other private schools in support of children, teachers, and families.
- The D. Samuel Gottesman Library offers some 210,000 volumes, more than 2,000 print journals, and more than 1,000 full-text online journals.

== Affiliations ==
Clinical affiliations include:

- Long Island Jewish Medical Center
- Bronx-Lebanon Hospital Center
- Bronx Psychiatric Center, Bronx Children’s Psychiatric Center
- Montefiore Medical Center
- Soundview Throggs Neck Community Health Center
- Preferred Health Network’s Flushing Hospital Medical Center and Wyckoff Heights Medical Center.

== History ==
Ferkauf grew out of Yeshiva University’s School of Education and Community Administration (1948–57) and Graduate School of Education (1957–65). It was named in 1965 in honor of Eugene and Estelle Ferkauf. It later became Ferkauf Graduate School of Humanities and Social Sciences (1966–77) and Ferkauf Graduate School (1977–82).

In 1975, with the merger of the Departments of Psychology and Educational Psychology to form the University-wide Department of Psychology, Ferkauf began to develop as a school of psychology. In 1979, the School of Professional Psychology was established at Ferkauf Graduate School.
