= Yeshiva University =

Private university in New York City, US

- Motto: תורה ומדע (Hebrew)
- Motto in English: Torah and secular knowledge
- Type: Private university
- Established: 1886; 140 years ago
- Accreditation: MSCHE
- Religious affiliation: Modern Orthodox Judaism
- Academic affiliations: NAICU
- Endowment: $714.15 million (2025)
- President: Ari Berman
- Faculty: 4,714
- Undergraduates: 2,243
- Postgraduates: 2,688
- Location: New York City, U.S. 40°51′02″N 73°55′47″W
- Campus: Urban, 300 acres (120 ha)
- Newspaper: The YU Observer; The Commentator
- Colors: Yeshiva Blue; Yeshiva Black; Yeshiva Gray
- Nicknames: Maccabees; Taubermans
- Sporting affiliations: NCAA Division III – Skyline
- Mascot: The Maccabee
- Website: yu.edu
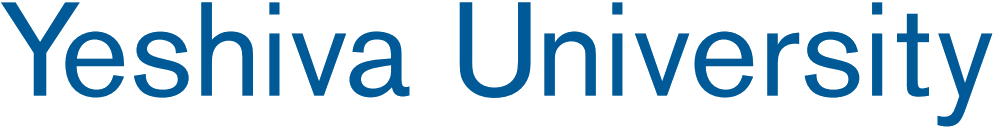

Yeshiva University is a private university with four campuses in New York City, United States. The university's undergraduate schools—Yeshiva College, Stern College for Women, and Sy Syms School of Business—offer a dual curriculum inspired by Modern–Centrist–Orthodox Judaism's hashkafa (philosophy) of Torah Umadda ("Torah and secular knowledge"), which synthesizes a secular academic education with the study of the Torah.

The majority of undergraduate students at the university identify as Modern Orthodox Jews. Hillel International estimates that nearly all of the university's undergraduate students are Jewish, while most of the graduate students are not, with the exception of those enrolled at Rabbi Isaac Elchanan Theological Seminary. This is especially the case at the Cardozo School of Law, the Sy Syms School of Business, the Katz College of Science and Health and the Ferkauf Graduate School of Psychology.

Yeshiva University is an independent institution chartered by New York State. It is accredited by the Middle States Commission on Higher Education.

== History ==
Yeshiva University has its roots in the Etz Chaim Yeshiva founded in 1886 on the Lower East Side of Manhattan, a cheder-style elementary school founded by Eastern European immigrants that offered study of Talmud along with some secular education, including instruction in English. Initially operating out of the Mariampol Synagogue at 44 East Broadway, the school laid the groundwork for advanced traditional studies in the United States.

In March 1897, the Rabbi Isaac Elchanan Theological Seminary (RIETS) was formally chartered as the first advanced rabbinical seminary in North America, founded by Rabbis Moses Mayer Matlin and Yehuda David Bernstein alongside administrator David Abramowitz. In 1922, a teachers' training school established under the auspices of the Mizrachi movement was absorbed into the expanding seminary framework.

Following the 1915 merger of the Etz Chaim Yeshiva and the Rabbi Isaac Elchanan Theological Seminary, Rabbi Dr. Bernard Revel was inaugurated as the institution's first president, serving from 1915 until his death in 1940. Under Revel's leadership, the institution championed the "Torah Umadda" philosophy, establishing the Talmudical Academy high school in 1916 and launching Yeshiva College in 1928 as the first undergraduate liberal arts college under Jewish auspices. Revel successfully orchestrated the relocation of the growing school to its permanent Moorish Revival-style campus in Washington Heights in 1929 and introduced the first graduate curriculum in Jewish studies in 1937.

After Revel's untimely death in December 1940, the financially strapped institution entered a three-year interregnum during which it was temporarily managed without a singular president. In June 1941, the Board of Trustees voted to establish a corporate presidium known as the Committee of Nine to collectively assume the rights, obligations, and administrative responsibilities of the presidency. The governing body was chaired by Samuel Levy, the Chairman of the Board of Trustees, and included Herman Geller, Mendel Gottesman, Rabbi Herbert S. Goldstein, Samuel Hausman, Rabbi Leo Jung, Abraham Mazer, Judge Samuel Mellitz and Rabbi Joseph H. Lookstein, the latter serving as the de facto administrative director.

In 1941, following the death of his father, Rabbi Moshe Soloveichik, Joseph B. Soloveitchik (known as "the Rav") joined the faculty as a Rosh Yeshiva at the Rabbi Isaac Elchanan Theological Seminary (RIETS). Over the course of his four-decade tenure, Soloveitchik became the intellectual anchor and preeminent spiritual leader of the institution. He played a foundational role in defining and articulating the university's "Torah Umadda" philosophy, bridging traditional Talmudic scholarship with Western philosophical thought. By the time of his retirement in the 1980s, he had ordained over 2,000 rabbis, deeply shaping the leadership and religious character of Modern Orthodoxy in North America.

With the dissolution of the temporary Executive Board, Rabbi Dr. Samuel Belkin was elected as the university's second president, serving from 1943 until his retirement in 1975. Under Belkin's expansive tenure, the institution transitioned from a localized college into a major research university, formally achieving university status from the New York State Board of Regents in 1945. He oversaw a massive institutional expansion, founding the graduate schools of social work, psychology, and Jewish studies, as well as establishing the historic opening of the Stern College for Women in 1954 and the Albert Einstein College of Medicine in 1955.

When Lamm took office in 1976, Yeshiva was facing a serious financial crisis. As a result, some of the schools and programs had to be consolidated or closed. The renowned Belfer Graduate School of Science was closed in 1978. Once this was stabilized, additional divisions were added: For example, the Sy Syms School of Business, with divisions for both the undergraduate men and women was opened in 1988. At this time, many of the undergraduate students began to spend their first year (or more) studying in yeshivot and other schools in Israel, which has become an almost universal practice, and a Joint Israel Program regulating these studies was established to allow them to receive credit for this year at Yeshiva. RIETS also maintains a campus in Jerusalem, and many of the rabbinic students spend a year studying there as well. Over the course of Lamm's tenure, enrollment grew considerably to over 2000 undergraduate students. In addition to its undergraduate schools and affiliates, Yeshiva maintains graduate schools in Jewish studies, Jewish education and administration, social work, psychology, law, and medicine. There are over fifteen schools in total. In addition, numerous joint undergraduate-graduate programs with other schools in the New York area and beyond are maintained. The Yeshiva University Museum, an affiliate of the school, is now one of the components of the Center for Jewish History, located in downtown Manhattan.

Under Joel's leadership, Yeshiva University's endowment was invested in high-risk investments, including the funds of Bernard Madoff. Losses of at least $110 million resulted. In early 2014, Moody's lowered the school's bond rating by five steps to B1, junk bond level. To raise funds and cut costs, Yeshiva University has sold off real estate, and transferred control of the Albert Einstein College of Medicine to Montefiore Medical Center.

Joel created the Yeshiva University Center for the Jewish Future, folding other programs, both from within and from outside YU, into it.

In December 2012, Joel apologized over allegations that two rabbis at the college's high school campus abused boys there in the late 1970s and early 1980s. Investigations into these allegations by The Jewish Daily Forward and a law firm hired by the university found "multiple instances in which the university either failed to appropriately act to protect the safety of its students or did not respond to the allegations at all." These allegations led to a 380 million dollar lawsuit by former students. The case has since been dismissed.

In 2012 the Middle States Commission on Higher Education warned the university "that its accreditation may be in jeopardy because of insufficient evidence that the institution is currently in compliance with Standard 10 (Faculty) and Standard 14 (Assessment of Student Learning)." On June 26, 2014, the Middle States Commission on Higher Education, which accredits the university "reaffirmed accreditation", but requested a progress report "evidence that student learning assessment information is used to improve teaching and learning." This was accepted by the commission on November 17, 2016 (wherein the university met the minimum requirements for accreditation).

In January 2016, the university disclosed plans to cede almost half of its $1 billion endowment to the Albert Einstein College of Medicine, as the medical college enters a separate joint venture with Montefiore Health System.

In the 2020–2021 school year, Yeshiva University enrolled approximately 2,250 undergraduate students, and 2,700 graduate students. It is also home to affiliated high schools—Yeshiva University High School for Boys and Yeshiva University High School for Girls—and the Rabbi Isaac Elchanan Theological Seminary (RIETS). It conferred 1,822 degrees in 2007 and offers community service projects serving New York, Jewish communities, the United States and Canada. As of 2015, the university had run an operating deficit for seven consecutive years. In 2014, it lost $84 million, and in 2013, it suffered a loss of $64 million.

In July 2026, the university received a $12.5 million donation from alumnus Alex Tsigutkin and his wife Diana, to support a new undergraduate electrical and computer engineering program, scholarships, engineering classrooms and laboratories.

=== Presidents ===
- Bernard Revel 1915–1940
- Samuel Belkin, 1943–1975
- Norman Lamm, 1976–2003
- Richard M. Joel, 2003–2017
- Ari Berman, 2017–present

== Academics ==
=== Schools ===
The university's academic programs are organized into the following schools:

- Yeshiva College for Men
- Stern College for Women
- Sy Syms School of Business

Graduate and professional schools

- Katz College of Science and Health
- Benjamin N. Cardozo School of Law
- Wurzweiler School of Social Work
- Azrieli Graduate School of Jewish Education and Administration
- Bernard Revel Graduate School of Jewish Studies
- Ferkauf Graduate School of Psychology
- Sy Syms School of Business

Affiliates

- Albert Einstein College of Medicine
- The Marsha Stern Talmudical Academy – Yeshiva University High School for Boys
- Samuel H. Wang Yeshiva University High School for Girls
- Rabbi Isaac Elchanan Theological Seminary
- Philip and Sarah Belz School of Jewish Music

=== Rankings ===
Academic rankings

National
- Forbes: 226
- U.S. News & World Report: 84 (tie)
- Washington Monthly: 267

Global
- ARWU: 901-1000
- QS: =624
- U.S. News & World Report: 265

The U.S. News & World Report's 2025 "America's Best Colleges" ranked Yeshiva University 84th (tie) in National University.

In 2023, Forbes ranked Yeshiva University as: No. 226 in "Top colleges 2023", No. 118 in Private Colleges, No. 143 in Research Universities, and No. 82 in the Northeast. Nationally, Yeshiva was ranked 138th by the Times Higher Education World University Rankings, and internationally it is ranked in the 900s by the Shanghai Jiao Tong University's Academic Ranking of World Universities and 369th in the world by the QS World University Rankings.

Ranked #2, Best Online Master's in Cybersecurity in the U.S. by Fortune Magazine.

== Campuses ==
The university's main campus, Wilf Campus, is located in the Washington Heights neighborhood of upper Manhattan. Yeshiva University's main office is located within the Wilf Campus, at 500 West 185th St. A 1928 plan to build a spacious Moorish Revival campus around several gardens and courtyards was canceled by the Great Depression of 1929 after only one building had been erected. Building continued after the Depression in modern style and by the acquisition of existing neighborhood buildings.

Since it was founded in 1886, Yeshiva University has expanded to comprise some twenty colleges, schools, affiliates, centers, and institutions, with several affiliated hospitals and healthcare institutions. It has campuses and facilities in Manhattan (Washington Heights, Murray Hill, Greenwich Village), the Bronx, Queens, and Israel.

The Yeshiva University Museum is a teaching museum and the cultural arm of Yeshiva University. Founded in 1973, Yeshiva University Museum is AAMG accredited and aims to provide a window into Jewish culture around the world and throughout history through multi-disciplinary exhibitions and publications.

The university's building in Jerusalem, in the Bayit VeGan neighborhood, contains a branch of the rabbinical seminary and an office coordinating the S. Daniel Abraham Israel Program. Under the latter, first year students studying in selected Israeli Yeshivot are considered YU undergraduates.

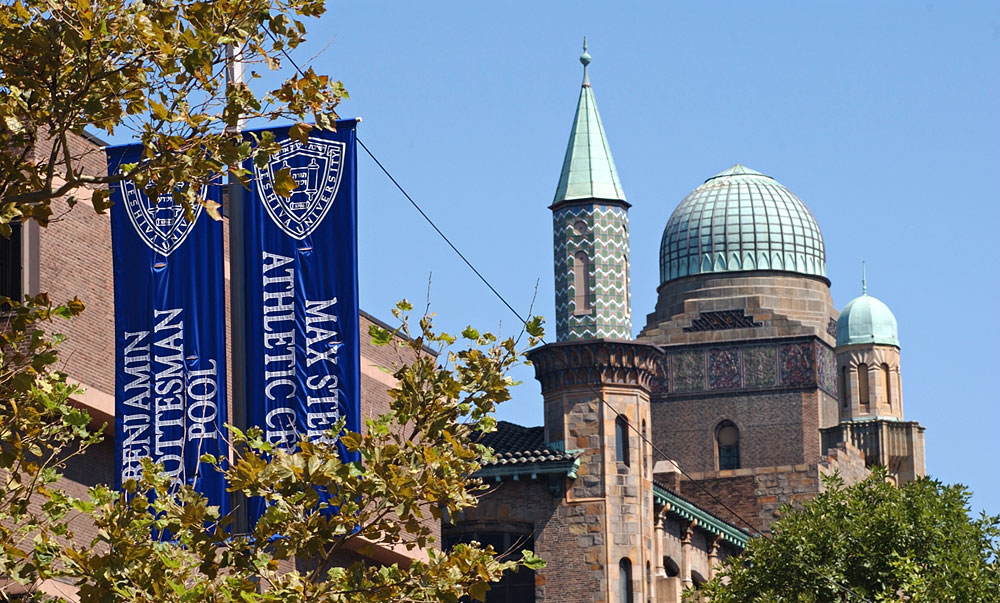
David H. Zysman Hall, on Yeshiva's Wilf Campus, is home to the former main beis midrash (Torah study hall)

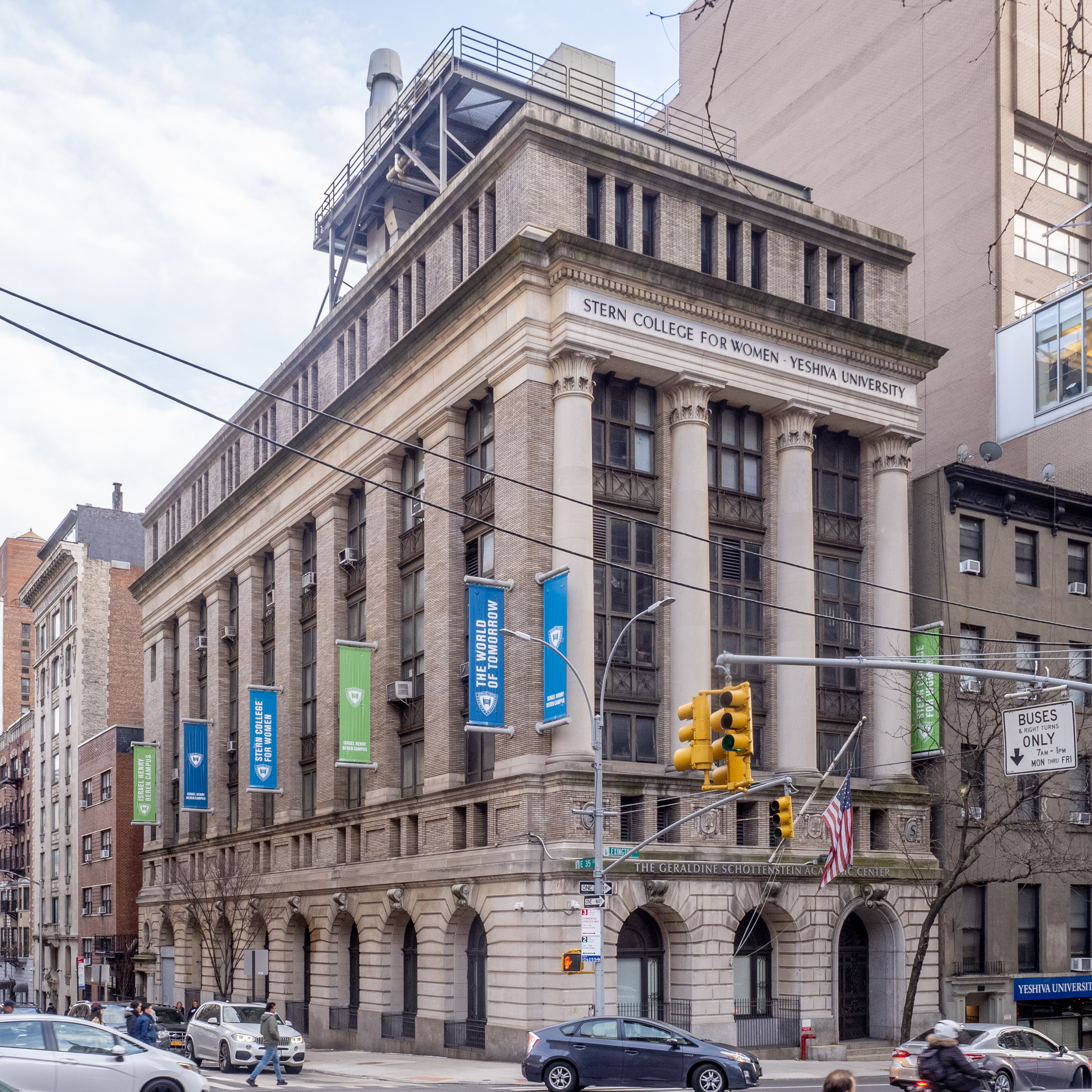
245 Lexington Avenue is the campus hub for the Stern College for Women

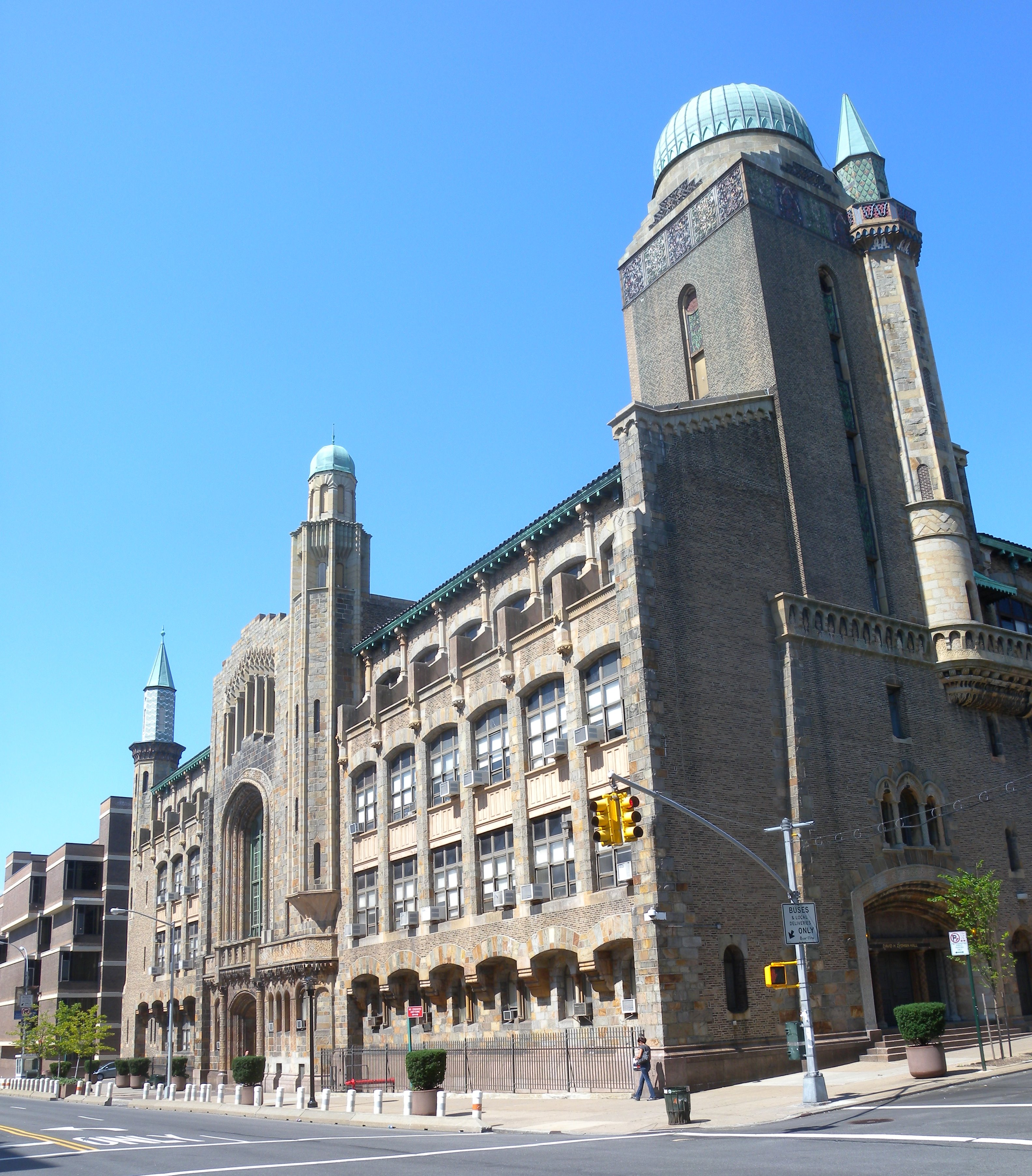
David H. Zysman Hall, on the Wilf Campus

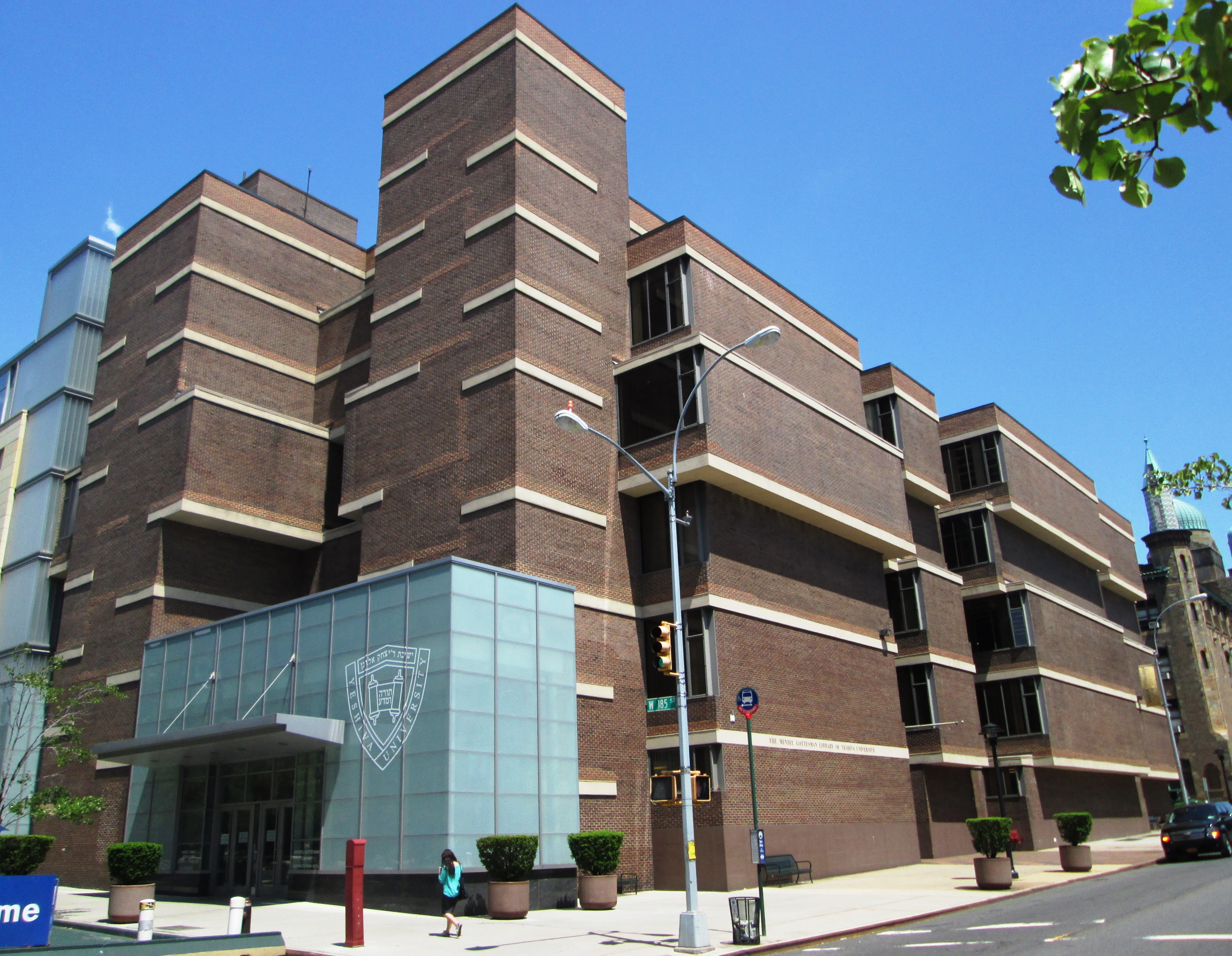
Gottesman Library

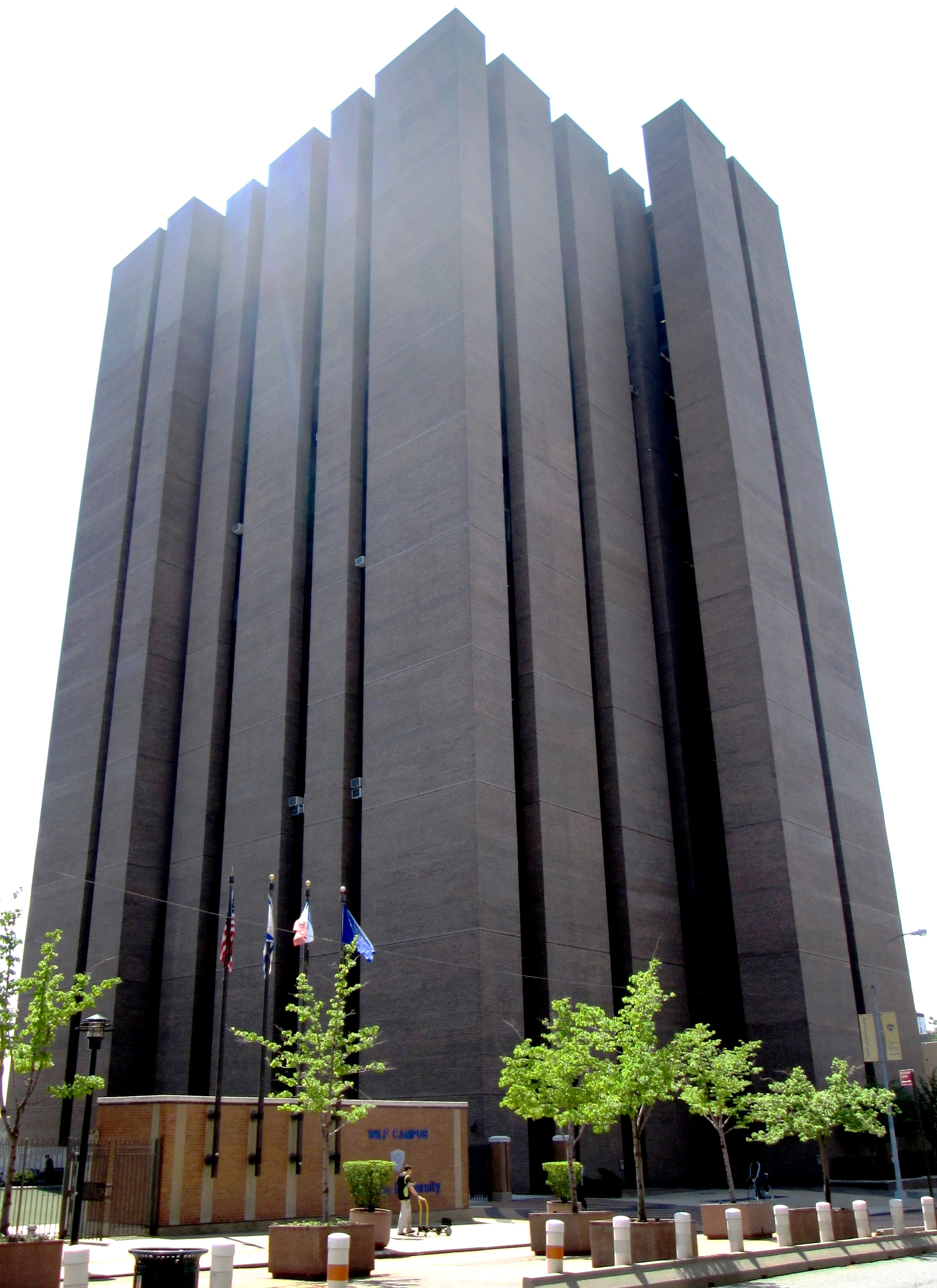
Belfer Hall

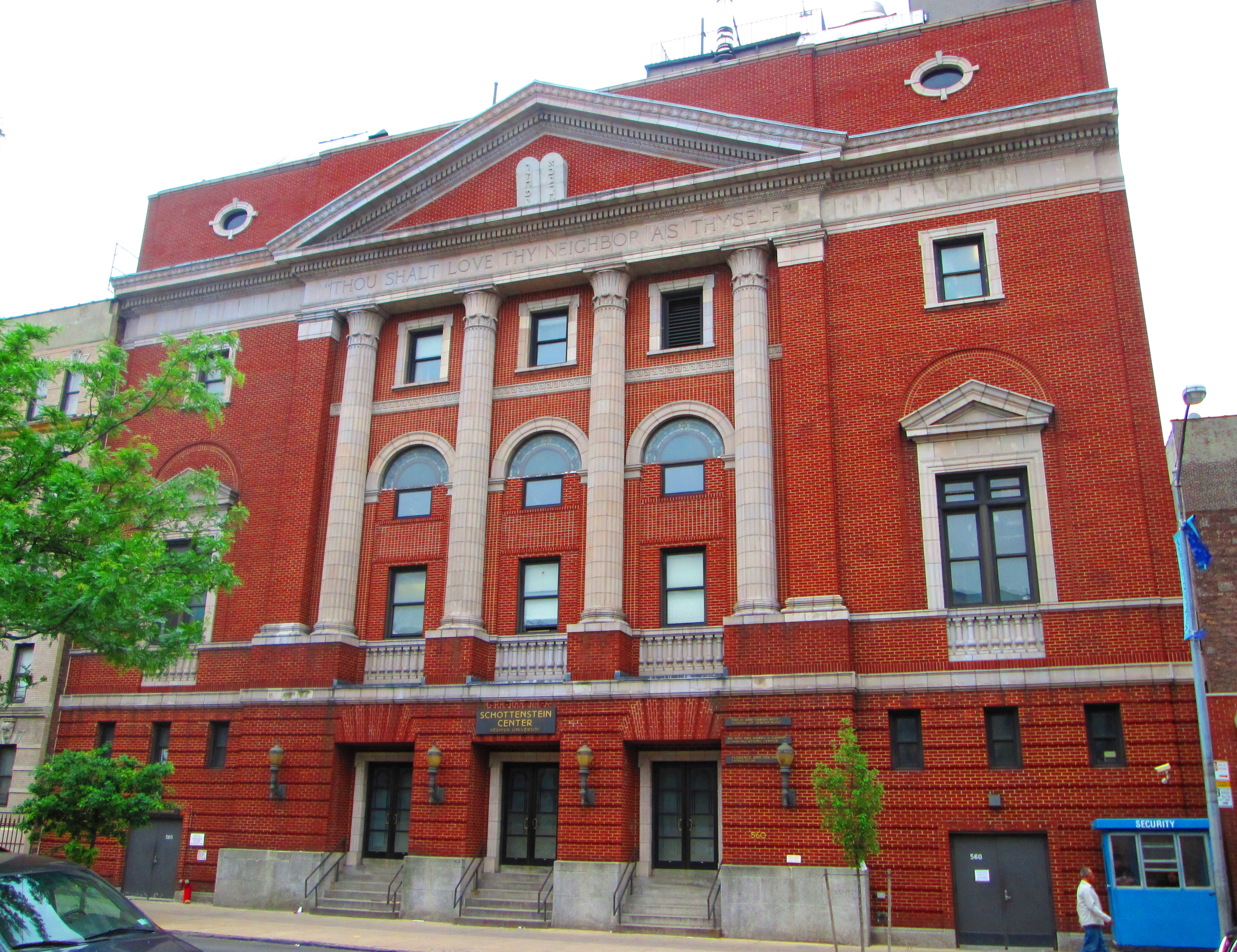
Schottenstein Center

== Student life ==
=== Student publications ===
The undergraduate university newspaper is The Commentator, and the newspaper for Stern College is The Observer. Law students at Cardozo also edit and publish five law journals. There are numerous other publications on a wide range of topics, both secular and religious, produced by the various councils and academic student organizations, along with many official university publications and the university press. The call letters of the student radio station are WYUR, and it is currently an Internet-only station.

=== LGBTQ+ club controversy and lawsuit ===
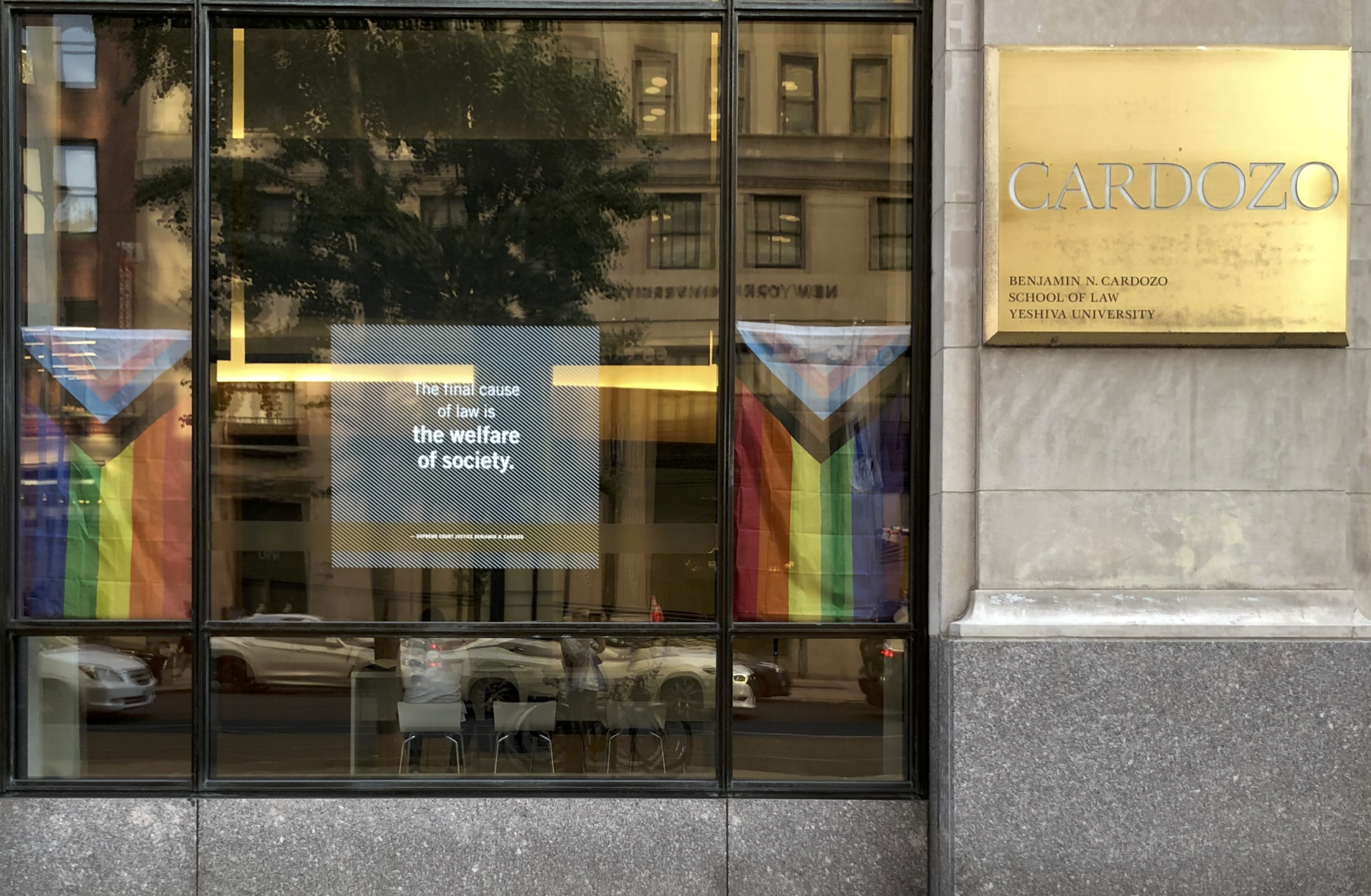
LGBTQ flags at YU's Cardozo School of Law (2022)

Yeshiva University has been involved in legal proceedings since April 2021 after it blocked official recognition of a Pride Alliance club for undergraduate LGBTQ+ students and their allies.

Controversy over LGBTQ-supportive undergraduate groups has been ongoing since at least 2009, when students created a "Tolerance Club." Its purpose was to promote acceptance of diversity of people within the Yeshiva University community. A founding member said that the group had "determined that the school’s lack of diversity has fostered significant insensitivity to those outside of the mainstream Y.U. culture" and aimed to address that issue. The group's members included undergraduates at both the men's and women's campuses. Although not organized to address LGBTQ issues specifically, the group's promotion of tolerance for sexual and gender diversity generated controversy on the Yeshiva University campus; the student newspaper reported that the administration quashed a panel discussion because they objected to one of the speakers, a gay Orthodox rabbi. This controversy came to a head when the Tolerance student organization sponsored a panel discussion entitled "Being Gay in the Orthodox World" in December, 2009. Several hundred people attended this panel discussion. Numerous Jewish news sources covered the panel and the conflict that enveloped the Yeshiva campus in its wake, and the Tolerance Club disbanded in May 2010.

A decade later, in 2021, undergraduate students sued the university for refusing to recognize a new LGBTQ+ student group, YU Pride Alliance. The university has retained the pro-religious practice law firm Becket Law as its counsel. A New York court ruled in June 2022 that the university must recognize the undergraduate Pride Alliance. The university appealed to the U.S. Supreme Court in August 2022, and a temporary stay was issued by Justice Sotomayor. In a 5–4 decision the full court vacated the stay without prejudice, ruling the NY appeals process was incomplete and thus SCOTUS relief premature. In response, the university put all student organizations on hold in September 2022, pending resolution of their ongoing legal challenges. This lasted for a matter of weeks until an agreement was reached between the plaintiff and defense allowing other student organizations to continue operating.

YU-affiliated Cardozo School of Law and the Ferkauf Graduate School of Psychology have publicly supported their own students and voiced their disapproval of the university's position and legal response. At Cardozo School of Law, there has long been an officially recognized LGBTQ+ student group, and the Graduate School of Psychology also publicly supports the LGBTQ members of their communities.

The university announced on October 24, 2022 that they approved "Kol Yisrael Areivim", a new LGBTQ student group. According to the university, this new group will be the "approved traditional Orthodox alternative to its current LGBTQ student group, the YU Pride Alliance". There is still a dispute with the Pride Alliance who claimed the university's action as a stunt and distraction. Administrators later described Kol Yisrael Areivim as "a framework within which we hope to eventually form a club". Kol Yisrael Areivim is not included on official club lists, and it does not have any student members. On April 10, 2023, a student journalist reported that Kol Yisrael Areivim was still yet to hold a single event.

On March 19, 2025, Yeshiva University announced that it would recognize the LGBT student club, bringing an end to the lawsuit. The club renamed itself to "Hareni". According to the agreement, five events were pre-approved for the coming year, and the club would "operate consistent with all other student organizations at the University" and "not be required to submit to any approval or oversight procedures that are not required for all student organizations." However, less than two months later, YU reversed itself and banned the club.

=== Undergraduate student organizations and activities ===
Student groups include the Yeshiva University Dramatics Society (YCDS), which puts on a performance each semester. A student-run group known as the Heights Initiative sponsors several outreach programs that work with the schools and organizations of the Washington Heights community. Student Government is run through YSU, YCSA, SOY-JSC, and SYMS. Additionally, these groups run community events like the annual Hanukkah Concert and a carnival celebrating Israeli Independence Day.

The Yeshiva University Medical Ethics Society (MES) is an undergraduate student-run organization of Yeshiva University which was founded by students in the fall of 2005 with the help of the Center for the Jewish Future toward the goal of promoting education and awareness of Jewish medical ethics in the university itself and the community at large. In the first several years, the group hosted a program of on-campus lectures in the field of medical ethics and Halakha (Jewish law). They also host genetic testing events to help combat the high incidence of various genetic diseases in the Jewish community.

=== Athletics ===
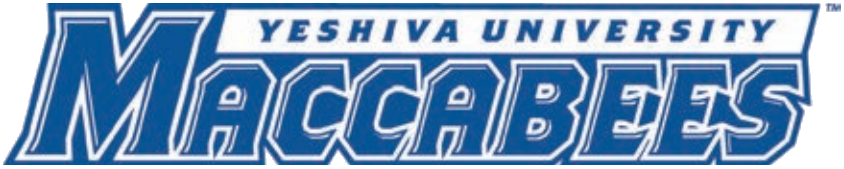
Yeshiva athletics wordmark

Yeshiva University includes a number of NCAA Division III-level sports teams. The teams, nicknamed "The Maccabees", include: men's baseball, basketball, golf, volleyball, wrestling, women's basketball, cross country, fencing, soccer, tennis, and volleyball.

Because of Yeshiva's dual curriculum, most of the sports teams practice at night, sometimes even as late as 11:00 pm. A few of the sports teams practice or work out before classes begin at 9:00 am; for example, the men's basketball team routinely practices at 6:00 am.

Teams have participated in weekend tournaments outside of New York City, with athletes staying with local families in the area. This took place in Boston with the basketball and fencing teams, and in Hollywood, Florida with the baseball team in 2008. Some international students have participated in NCAA sports, with as many as nine different nationalities representing the school on the sports field.

An Associated Press feature on the 2019-20 team described the Maccabees as integrating Orthodox Jewish practice into their athletic schedule: the team did not play on the Sabbath, Jewish holidays, or fast days, and players gathered before tipoff for a Torah-based pregame talk.

==== Baseball ====
Two members of the Yeshiva Maccabees Baseball team were drafted out of college by professional teams of the Israeli Baseball League. Pitcher Aryeh Rosenbaum celebrated a championship with his team in the IBL's first year. From 2023 to 2025, the Maccabees went on a 100 game losing streak spanning three years. On April 8, 2025, Yeshiva broke their streak with a 9–5 victory over Lehman College in the second game of a split doubleheader.

==== Basketball ====
Yeshiva's Men's Basketball team is an annual playoff contender. The most successful eras for Yeshiva basketball in recent history have been at the start and end of the 1990s, as well as the dawn of the 2020s. Banners hang in the Max Stern Athletic Center commemorating seasons from both eras. The 2007–08 season had particular note as Yeshiva was home to the Skyline Conference's Rookie of the Year. In 2018, the team won the Skyline Conference title in a game against SUNY Purchase, earning its first-ever NCAA berth and considerable media coverage. The current head coach of the team is Elliot Steinmetz, who has been with the team since 2014. Steinmetz succeeded Jonathan Halpert, the longest ever tenured NCAA men's basketball coach in New York City at 42 years. Steinmetz, a practicing lawyer, has been especially successful at attracting high caliber athletes, recognizing that Yeshiva's status in the Orthodox Jewish world means its athletics programs have unique access to a global talent pool from which to recruit players.

In the 2019–20 season, the men's basketball team's only loss was in the season opener, with the Maccabees going on to win the Skyline Conference championship. This was the second time in three years that the Maccabees made the NCAA Division III Tournament. They won the first two rounds, pushing them into the Sweet Sixteen (3rd round) for the first time in school history. Before they played in the third round, the NCAA tournament was canceled due to COVID-19. After a 7–0 season in 2020–21 also abbreviated by COVID-19, the Maccabees entered the 2021–22 season on a 36-game winning streak, the longest current streak in NCAA men's basketball in any division, and were ranked #2 in the preseason by the Division III basketball website D3hoops.com. During this streak, the team was featured by media outlets as diverse as ESPN, CNN, the New York Daily News, the Los Angeles Times, and The Wall Street Journal. After previous #1 Randolph–Macon lost in overtime, the Maccabees, with their winning streak having reached 44 games, inherited the #1 ranking in the D3hoops.com poll released on November 29, 2021, marking the first time any Yeshiva team had topped any national poll. The Maccabees received recognition from the ESPN and NBA Twitter accounts for their 50th straight win, the longest winning streak in NCAA Men's Division III Basketball.

As of December 29, 2021, the men's basketball team held the then-longest active winning streak in men's college basketball with 50 consecutive wins. On December 30, 2021, the men's basketball team lost their winning streak.

==== Fencing ====
One of the most successful teams in Yeshiva University sports history is the fencing team, known as the "Taubermen", named after the coach of the team, Professor Arthur Tauber, who served as the head coach of the team from 1949 through 1985.

==== Tennis ====
In 2014, the Men's Tennis team won the Skyline Conference championship, becoming the first team in school history to advance to the NCAA tournament in any sport. In 2015, the Men's Tennis team repeated as Skyline Conference champions and went back to the NCAA National Tournament, advancing to the second round. They lost to the defending National Champions Amherst College. In 2016, the Men's Tennis team won the Skyline Conference a third year in a row and advancing to the NCAA D3 National Tennis Tournament again. The Men's Tennis team repeated as Skyline Conference champions in 2017 and 2018 to extend this streak of success to five consecutive NCAA National Tournament appearances.

==== Wrestling ====
Olympic gold medalist Henry Wittenberg was at one time the coach of the wrestling team.

==== Other sports ====
Since 2010, the Men's Cross Country and Men's Volleyball teams have won multiple championships. Many of the Maccabees have gained attention nationwide, like Sam Cohen won an individual championship as well as Capital One Academic honors. Other attention grabbers come from Women's Basketball and Women's Fencing.

== Notable alumni ==
- Professor of Hebrew Literature & Philosophy at Harvard Shaye J. D. Cohen (B.A. 1970)
- Former Vermont Governor Howard Dean (M.D. 1978)
- Judge Sandra J. Feuerstein, of the United States District Court for the Eastern District of New York (J.D. 1979)
- Mass murderer and terrorist Baruch Goldstein (B.A. 1977, M.D. 1981)
- Restaurateur and writer Eddie Huang (J.D. 2008)
- Rabbi and Director of Torah Umesorah Joseph Kaminetsky (B.A. 1932)
- Singer-songwriter Lucy Kaplansky
- Aaron Klein, author and chief strategist for Prime Minister Benjamin Netanyahu.
- Diplomat Daniel C. Kurtzer (B.A. 1971)
- Rabbi and 3rd president of Yeshiva University Norman Lamm (B.A. 1949, Rabbinic Ordination 1951, PhD. 1966)
- New York Congresswoman Grace Meng (J.D.)
- Republican political strategist Nicolas Muzin
- Law professor A. Leo Levin at the University of Pennsylvania (B.A. 1939)
- Author Chaim Potok (B.A. 1950)
- Baseball executive David Samson (J.D. 1992)
- Rabbi and author Harold M. Schulweis (B.A. 1945)
- Radio network president and host Nachum Segal (B.A. 1984)
- Former Speaker of the New York State Assembly Sheldon Silver (B.A. 1978)
- Kalman Sporn (born 1971), businessman
- National Public Radio host Laura Sydell (J.D.)
- Professional basketball player Ryan Turell (2022)
- President of the United Federation of Teachers Randi Weingarten (J.D. 1983)
- Triple Crown-winning racehorse owner Ahmed Zayat (B.A. 1983)

== Notable staff ==
- Adrienne Asch, bioethics scholar
- Abraham Cahan, publisher of the socialist Jewish Daily Forward newspaper (English Department of Etz Chaim Yeshiva)
- Paul A. M. Dirac, Nobel Prize winner in Physics
- Paul Greengard, Nobel Prize winner in Medicine
- Joe Lieberman, US Senator
- Julius B. Maller, educator and sociologist
- Oliver Sacks, British neurologist, naturalist, historian of science, and writer
- Red Sarachek, basketball coach
- Joseph B. Soloveitchik, rabbi
- Telford Taylor, lawyer
- Bob Tufts, Major League Baseball pitcher, taught sports marketing
- Henry Wittenberg, Olympic champion in freestyle wrestling, taught wrestling
- Herman Wouk, author
- James Yates, judge
- Leonard Susskind, physicist

== See also ==
- List of Jewish universities and colleges in the United States
- Orthodox Judaism
- Bar-Ilan University
- Hebrew Theological College
- Jerusalem College of Technology
- Lander College for Men
- Yeshiva § United States
