= Yeshivat Kerem B'Yavneh =

Yeshiva in Central Israel

Yeshivat Kerem B'Yavne: ישיבת כרם ביבנה (Hebrew)
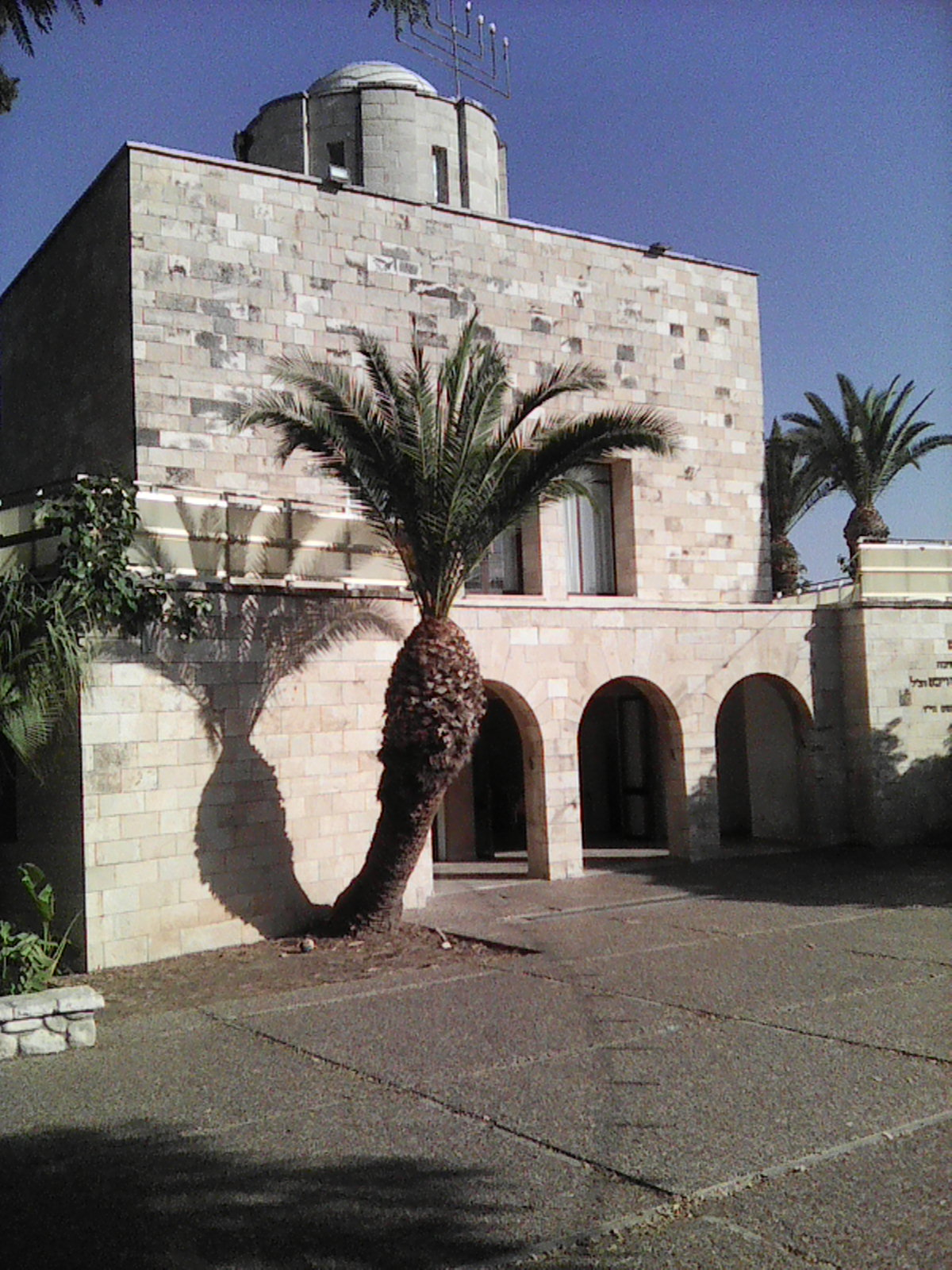

- Location within Central Israel Location within Israel
- Coordinates: 31°49′06″N 34°43′21″E
- Country: Israel
- District: Central
- Subdistrict: Rehovot
- Council: Hevel Yavne
- Founded: 1954
- Founder: Rabbi Chaim Yaakov Goldvicht
- Population (2024): 520

Yeshivat Kerem B'Yavne (Hebrew: ישיבת כרם ביבנה, lit. Vineyard in Yavne Yeshiva) is a major yeshiva in southern Israel. Located near the city of Ashdod and adjacent to Kvutzat Yavne, it falls under the jurisdiction of Hevel Yavne Regional Council. In 2024 it had a population of 520.

== History ==
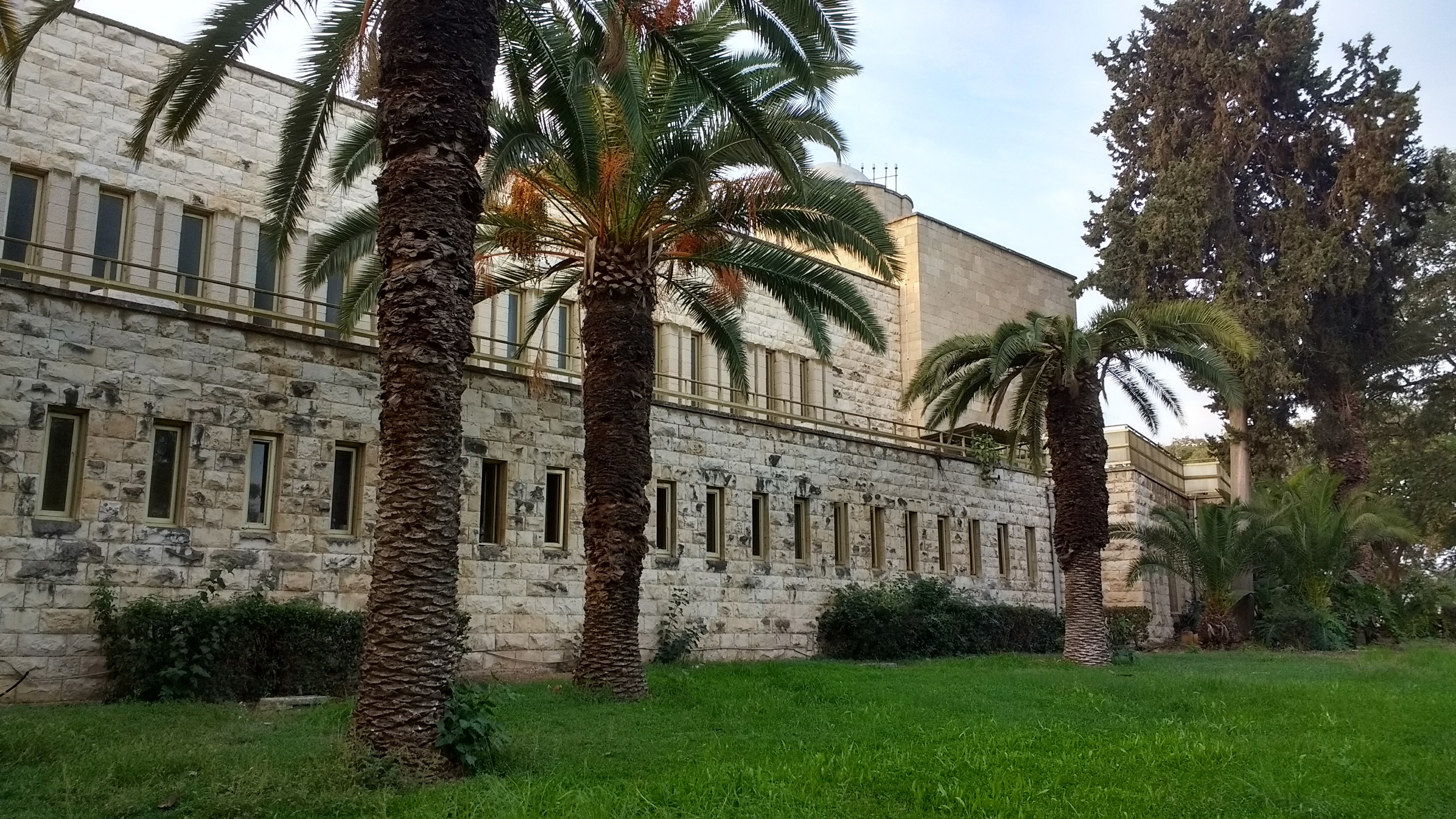
Beis Medrash of Yeshivas Kerem B'Yavne

Founded in 1954, Kerem BeYavneh was the first Yeshivat Hesder. The first Rosh Yeshiva of Kerem B'Yavneh was the renowned scholar Rabbi Chaim Yaakov Goldvicht. Following Goldvicht's retirement, Rabbi Mordechai Greenberg succeeded his position, himself an alumnus of the yeshiva, and Rosh Kollel. In the summer zman of 5774, Rabbi Menachem Mendel Blachman was appointed to be the Associate Rosh Yeshiva to Rabbi Greenberg. In 5777, Rav Gavriel Saraf was appointed to be Rosh HaYeshiva along side Rav Aharon Friedman. The current Head of the Overseas Program is Rabbi David Zahtz.

Like all Yeshivot Hesder, Kerem B'Yavneh is a religious Zionist institution. It has an open outlook towards Western culture, both with faculty holding university degrees and students attending university.

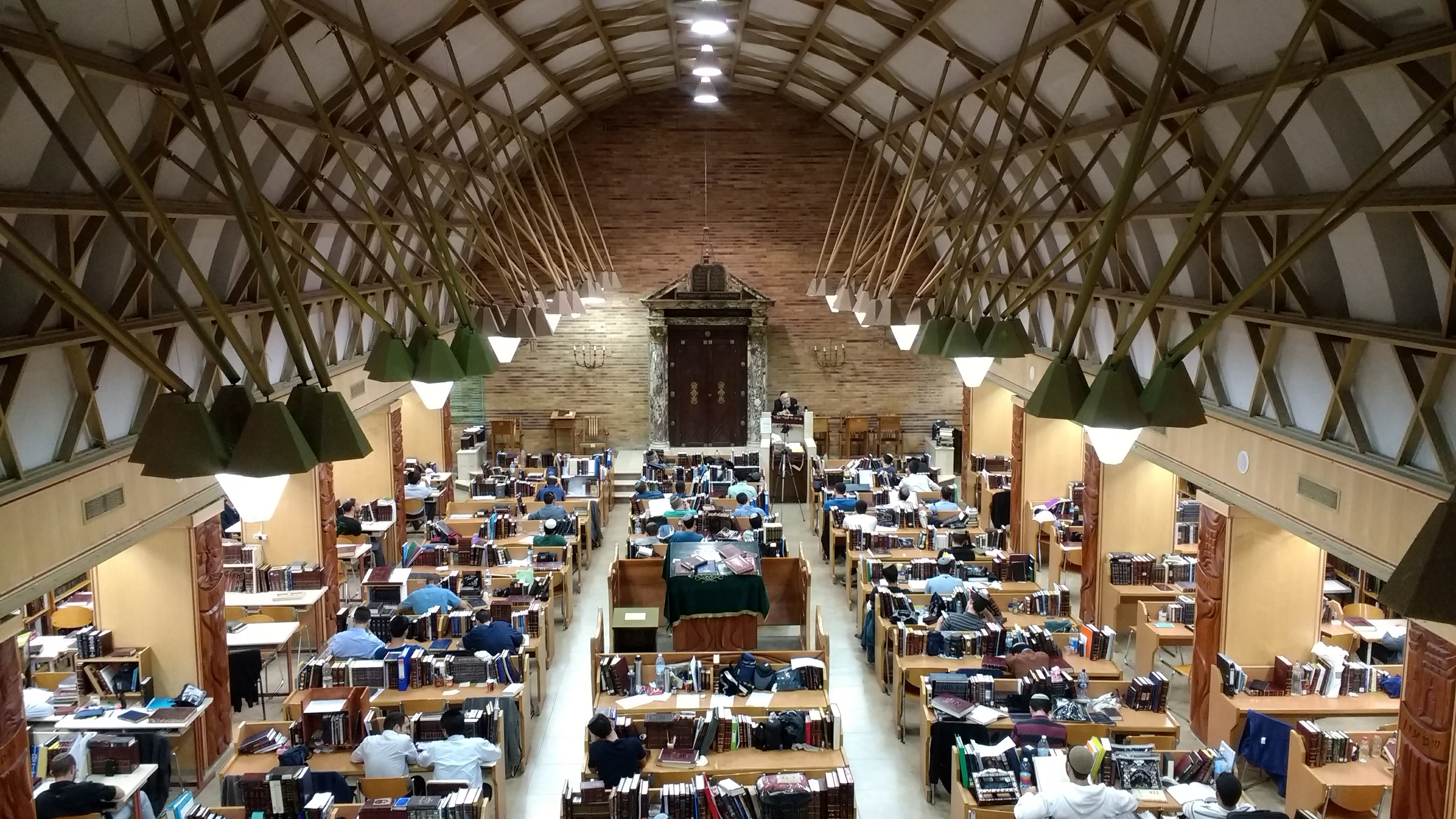
Inside Yeshivas Kerem B'Yavne Beis Medrash during Rav Kav's shiur klali

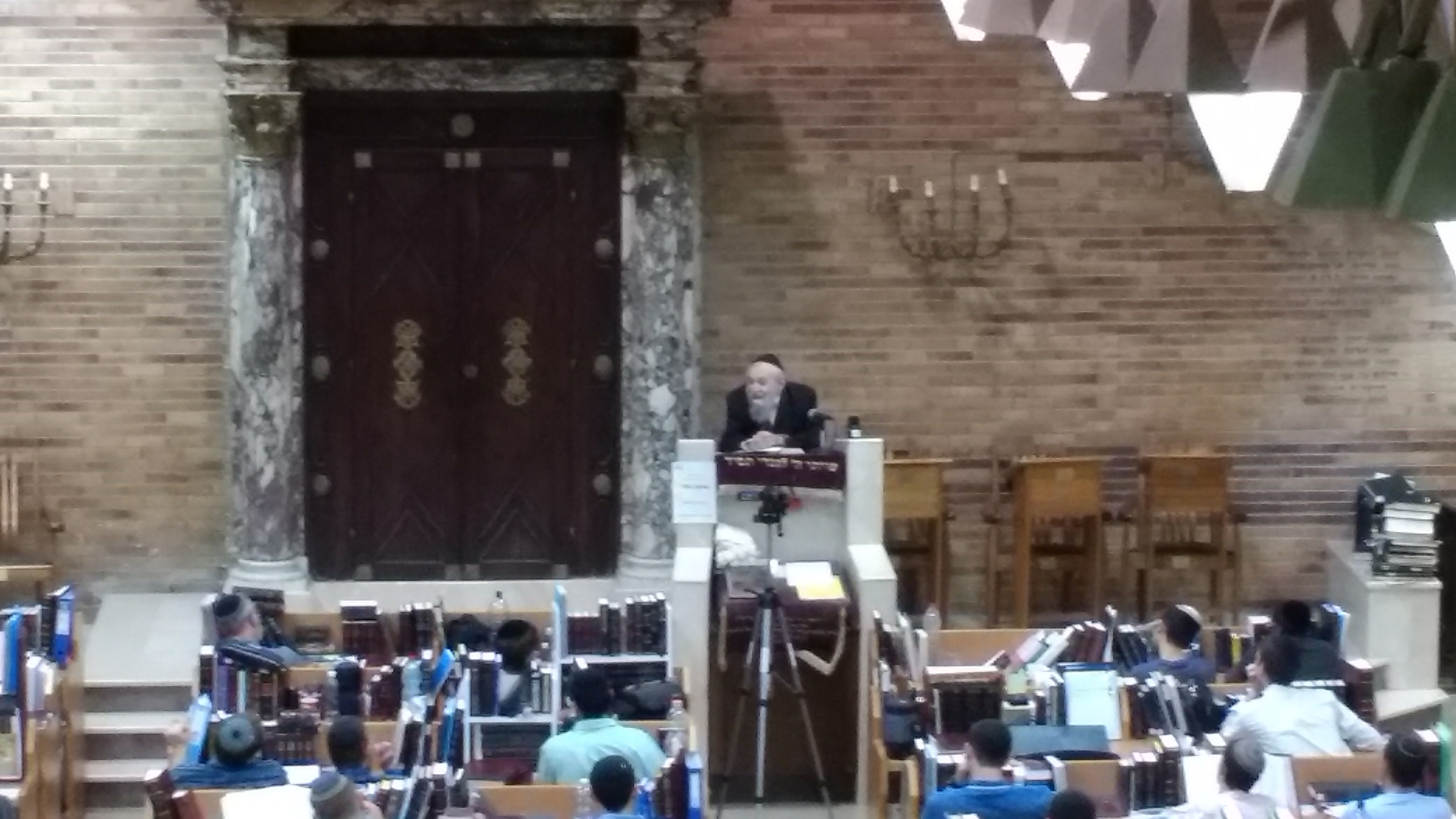
Shiur Klali in Kerem B'Yavne

Programs within the yeshiva include a Hesder track, a gap-year for overseas students, and a Kollel Rabbanut as well as a Kollel Ledayanut (a Kollel for training of religious court judges).

The yeshiva had an enrollment of 296 students in 2021, the 9th most attended Hesder Yeshiva in Israel, with students from Israel and from overseas, most of whom reside in dormitories on campus. Most overseas students come from the United States, the United Kingdom, South Africa, and Canada, other countries are also represented.

== Notable rabbinic alumni ==
- Rabbi Yehuda Amit, Rosh Yeshiva of Kiryat Malakhi
- Rabbi Yisrael Ariel, Head of Machon Hamikdash (Temple Institute)
- Rabbi Kalman Ber, Ashkenazi Chief Rabbi of Israel.
- Rabbi Zephaniah Drori, Rav and Rosh Yeshiva of Kiryat Shmona
- Rabbi Eytan Feiner, Rav of The White Shul in Far Rockaway.
- Rabbi Richard J. Israel, rabbi, educator, civil rights activist, and author
- Rabbi Yisroel Kaminetsky, Rosh HaYeshiva of Davis Renov Stahler Yeshiva High School for Boys (DRS Yeshiva High School) and Director of NCSY Summer Kollel
- Rabbi Ari Marcus, Rosh HaYeshiva of Yeshivat Reishit Yerushalayim in Beit Shemesh, Israel
- Rabbi Zalman Baruch Melamed, Rav and Rosh Yeshiva of Beit El
- Rabbi Yona Metzger, former Ashkenazi Chief Rabbi of Israel
- Rabbi Ephraim Mirvis, current Chief Rabbi of the United Hebrew Congregations of the Commonwealth
- Pesach Wolicki, former Rosh Yeshiva of Yeshivat Yesodei HaTorah and associate director of CJCUC.

A number of the staff and rabbinic alumni at Yeshiva University's Rabbi Isaac Elchanan Theological Seminary studied at Kerem B'Yavneh, including:

- Rabbi Meir Goldwicht, Rosh Yeshiva at Yeshiva University (RIETS)
- Rabbi Mordechai Willig, Rosh Yeshiva at Yeshiva University (RIETS), Rav of Young Israel of Riverdale
- Rabbi Zvi Sobolofsky, Rosh Yeshiva at Yeshiva University (RIETS), Rav of Congregation Ohr Hatorah
- Rabbi Baruch Simon, Rosh Yeshiva at Yeshiva University (RIETS)
- Rabbi Yonason Sacks, Rosh Yeshiva at Lander College for Men, a former Rosh Yeshiva at Yeshiva University (RIETS), Rav of Agudas Yisroel of Passaic
- Rabbi Aryeh Lebowitz, Director of Semikhah at RIETS and Mara D'asra of Beis Haknesses of North Woodmere, formerly a Maggid Shiur at Davis Renov Stahler Yeshiva High School for Boys (DRS Yeshiva High School) and at Lander College for Men

== Other notable alumni ==
- Ohad Moskowitz, Jewish singer
- Hanan Porat, Israeli politician
- Uri Bin Nun, director, Israel Electric Corporation
- Yigal Amir, assassin of Israeli Prime Minister Yitzhak Rabin
- Yitzhak Levy, Knesset member and government minister
- Yedidia Stern, Jewish People Policy Institute
- Hillel Fuld, an American Israeli technology business advisor, blogger, and vlogger
