= Eytan Feiner =

American Orthodox rabbi and educator

Rabbi Eytan Feiner

Personal life
- Born: Five Towns, Long Island, New York, U.S.
- Spouse: Aviva Feiner
- Children: Avraham Yeshaya Feiner
- Education: Johns Hopkins University
- Occupation: Rabbi, educator, lecturer

Religious life
- Religion: Judaism
- Denomination: Orthodox

Jewish leader
- Position: Rabbi
- Synagogue: Congregation Kneseth Israel ("White Shul")
- Residence: Far Rockaway, Queens, New York City
- Semikhah: Ner Israel Rabbinical College

Rabbi Eytan Feiner is an American Orthodox rabbi, educator, lecturer, and communal leader who serves as the full-time rabbi of Congregation Kneseth Israel, popularly known as the White Shul, in Far Rockaway, New York. He is a widely sought after speaker in Orthodox Jewish communities, a former maggid shiur at Aish HaTorah in Jerusalem, and the summer rabbi of Chai Lifeline's Camp Simcha.

== Early life and education ==
Feiner was born and raised in the Five Towns area of Long Island, New York. He studied at Ner Israel Rabbinical College in Baltimore, Maryland, where he received rabbinic ordination. During the same period, he pursued a master's degree at Johns Hopkins University. His principal rabbinic teacher was Rabbi Tzvi Berkowitz, under whom he studied at Ner Israel for five years.

== Career ==
Before assuming the rabbinate at the White Shul, Feiner lived in Israel, where he served as a maggid shiur at Aish HaTorah in Jerusalem. He also taught regularly at Yeshivat HaKotel, Michlala, the Gra Shul in Sha'arei Hesed, and other yeshivot and seminaries throughout Israel. In addition, he lectured for Gateways programs.

Feiner became associated with Congregation Kneseth Israel after returning from Israel with his wife, Aviva, to seek medical treatment for their son, Avraham Yeshayahu. He was first invited to serve as scholar-in-residence for Rosh Hashanah, after which the congregation offered him the position of interim rabbi. In January 2010, after an initial one-year contract, the congregation announced that Feiner had signed on for an additional two years as rabbi of the White Shul.

Feiner is a frequent lecturer in Orthodox Jewish communities and has served as a scholar-in-residence in numerous communities. He gives monthly shiurim at Lander's Yeshiva and has also taught at Machon Basya Rochel Seminary. He has been described by BensTorah as "one of the most sought after Orthodox Jewish speakers in the United States" and as possessing a strong recall of Jewish sources.

Feiner is also featured as a speaker on TorahAnytime and has authored or presented Torah material through Aish.com and other Orthodox Jewish educational platforms.

Feiner serves as the summer rabbi of Chai Lifeline's Camp Simcha, a camp for children with serious illnesses. He has also been associated with Bonei Olam, an organization supporting couples facing infertility.

== Personal life ==
Feiner is married to Aviva Feiner. The couple experienced twelve and a half years of unexplained infertility before the birth of their son, Avraham Yeshaya, also known as Shaya, who was named after the Chazon Ish. Feiner has spoken publicly about his son's significant physical and cognitive disabilities, including his inability to speak or walk, and about the impact of those experiences on his communal work.
