= Yechiel Michel Tucazinsky =

Israeli halachic scholar

Rabbi Yechiel Michel Tucaccinsky יחיאל מיכל טוקצינסקי

Personal life
- Born: 27 December 1871 Lyakhavichy, Belarus
- Died: 31 March 1955 (aged 83) Jerusalem, Israel
- Buried: Sanhedria Cemetery, Jerusalem

Religious life
- Religion: Judaism
- Denomination: Orthodox

Rabbi Yechiel Michel Tucazinsky (Hebrew: יחיאל מיכל טוקצינסקי; 1871–1955) was a halachic scholar and author who served as rosh yeshiva of the Etz Chaim Yeshiva in Jerusalem. He is best known for his work on the laws of mourning, Gesher HaChaim, and for developing the Israeli religious calendar.

== Biography ==
Yechiel Michel Tucazinsky was born on 27 December 1871 in Lyakhavichy, Belarus.

His father died when he was 8, and his mother remarried to Rabbi Joshua Rabinowitz. In 1882, at age 10, Tucazinsky immigrated to Jerusalem alone, where he lived with his grandfather. There he studied in the Etz Chaim Yeshiva in Jerusalem. Later, he was appointed head of the yeshiva, and his son, Rabbi Nissan Aharon Tucazinsky, subsequently ran it for over fifty years.

While a student in Etz Chaim, Tucazinsky studied together with Rabbi Yehoshua Hessin Besel, who ignited his interest his interest in calculations and Jewish event cycles. This led to his creation of a calendar detailing the various Jewish holidays and their practices, and daily astronomical calculations affecting the times of various religious practices, such as the time for various prayers, and the onset and departure of the Sabbath.

In 1890, at age 18, he married Toba, granddaughter of Rabbi Benjamim Salant, and great-granddaughter of Rabbi Shmuel Salant, the rabbi of Jerusalem and founder of Etz Chaim. In 1897, the latter granted rabbinic ordination to Tucazinsky, and a few years later, approached him to join the Beth Din (rabbinical court) of Eda HaChareidis. Tucazinsky agreed instead to lead the Etz Chaim yeshiva, but recommended his friend, Rabbi Tzvi Pesach Frank, for the position of judge. Frank accepted the position and eventually became chief justice of the court for many years.

It was under Tucazinsky's watch that Etz Chaim purchased its Jaffa Road property and moved there from its shared campus with the Hurva synagogue.

Tucazinsky was active in the foundation of new suburbs in Jerusalem and favoured the unification of all sections of the Jewish population.

He died on 31 March 1955 and is buried in the Sanhedria Cemetery of Jerusalem. The Jerusalem municipality honoured his memory by naming the street Gesher HaChaim in the Mekor Baruch neighbourhood after the title of his book.

In 1952, Tucazinsky was awarded the Rav Kook Prize from the Tel Aviv–Jaffa Municipality for Torah Literature.

== Other works ==
Although best known for his work Gesher HaChaim and described as "one of the premier authorities on the Laws of Mourning", another cited work is his Hayomam BeKadur Ha'aretz, regarding The International Dateline in Jewish Law.

In 1904, Rabbi Tucazinsky initiated the annual Luach Eretz Yisrael calendar. It contains the cycle of yearly synagogue and holiday practices, and astronomical calculation directing the times of prayer and the start/end of the Sabbath and holidays. The similar Ezras Torah calendar used in North America is patterned after Tucazinsky's.

He also authored:

- Ir HaKodesh V'Hamikdash – on Halachic issues related to Jerusalem and the Temple in Jerusalem
- Toharat Yisrael (c. 1910)
- Hilkhot Shevi'it (1910) on the laws of the Sabbatical Year
- Tekufat ha-Chamah u-Virkatah (1924) – on the solar cycle and the Birkat Hachama blessing
- Sefer Eretz Yisrael (1955) on laws and customs appertaining to Eretz Israel
