= Meir Goldwicht =

American rabbi

Rabbi Meir Goldwicht מאיר גולדוויכט
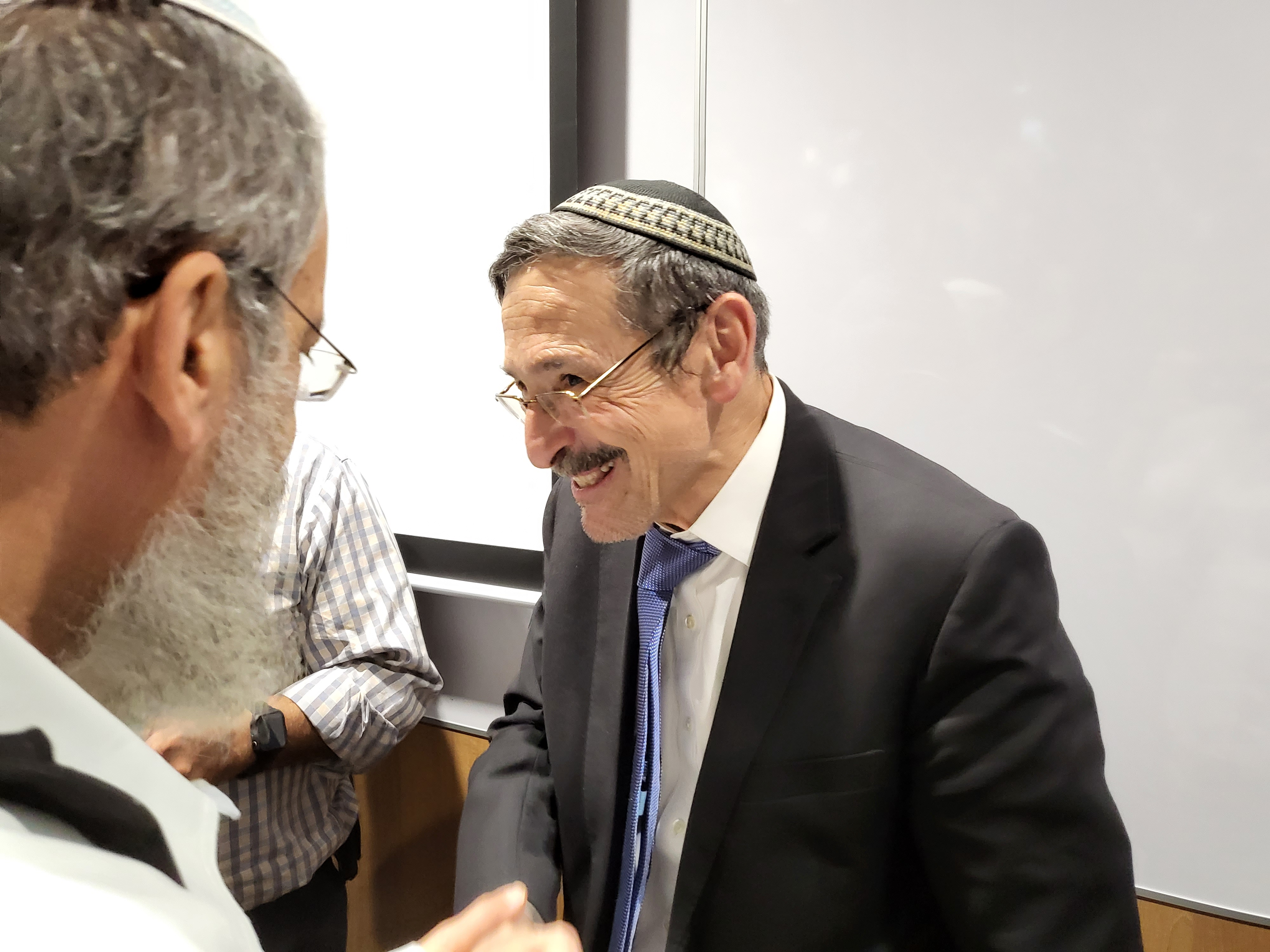

Personal life
- Born: Israel
- Spouse: Hila Goldwicht
- Children: Elyada Goldwicht, Eitiel Goldwicht, Aviad Goldwicht, Elimor Goldwicht, Orital Goldwicht
- Education: Yeshivat Kerem B'Yavneh

Religious life
- Religion: Judaism
- Denomination: Orthodox

Jewish leader
- Position: Rosh Yeshiva
- Yeshiva: RIETS
- Residence: Washington Heights, Manhattan
- Semikhah: Zalman Nechemia Goldberg, Betzalel Zolty, Ovadia Yosef

Meir Goldwicht (Hebrew: מאיר גולדוויכט) is an American Orthodox rabbi and rosh yeshiva at Yeshiva University in Washington Heights, Manhattan. He was born in Israel, studied in Yeshivat Kerem B'Yavneh under his uncle Rabbi Chaim Yaakov Goldvicht, the Rosh Yeshiva, and had close ties to Rabbi Shlomo Zalman Auerbach and Rabbi Ovadia Yosef.

== Early life and education ==
Goldwicht studied initially under Rabbi Yiśakhar Meʼir at Yeshivat HaNegev, and from there he continued to Kerem BeYavneh, which was founded and headed by his uncle Rabbi Chaim Yaakov Goldvicht. At Kerem BeYavneh, Goldwicht established close ties with Rabbi Zalman Nechemia Goldberg, with whom he was a Chavrusa. He also participated in a study group (chaburah) with Rabbis Shlomo Fisher, Yeshayahu Hadari, and Moshe Shapira (the philosopher). He attributes the bulk of his Torah to them. Goldwicht received semicha from Rabbi Zalman Nechemia Goldberg in 1980, as well as Rabbis Bezalel Zolty and Ovadia Yosef. He also served as Maggid Shiur in Kerem B'Yavneh before coming to Yeshiva University.

== Career ==
Goldwicht is the Joel and Maria Finkle Visiting Israeli Rosh Yeshiva and a rosh yeshiva at the Yeshiva Program/Mazer School of Talmudic Studies at Yeshiva University. He is also head rosh yeshiva at the Irving I. Stone Beit Midrash Program. In his early years in America, he received regular correspondences from Rabbi Shlomo Zalman Auerbach encouraging him and praising him for his continued efforts to teach Torah.

In addition to his regular classes at Yeshiva University, Goldwicht delivers shiurim extensively all over the New York metropolitan area and in Israel. A popular lecturer who delivers more than 1,000 lectures every year, Goldwicht has been described as “an absolute phenomenon” by Rabbi Zevulun Charlop for his colorful style that captivates audiences. "Rabbi Meir Goldwicht is an iconic steward of a 3,000-year-old heritage of Jewish learning,” said Dr. Ari Berman. He received the presidential medallion from Yeshiva University in 2017.

Goldwicht is also Rosh Kollel at Camp Mesorah.

== Family ==
Goldwicht's sons include Rabbi Elyada Goldwicht, founder of the Semichat Chaver Program, Rabbi Eitiel Goldwicht, a rabbi at Aish HaTorah and founder of Aish Israel and former assistant rabbi of Beit Knesset Hanassi in Rehavia, and Rabbi Aviad Goldwicht, who has a regular shiur in Beit Kenesset Chorev in Rechavia and is on his third cycle of Daf Yomi beIyun in English.

== Published works ==
- Meir Panim, Elul and Moadei Tishrei, 2019
- Meir Panim, Chanukah and Purim, 2020
- Meir Panim, Haggadah Shel Pesach, 2021
