= Pesach Pruskin =

Russian Orthodox Jewish rabbi and rosh yeshiva

Rabbi Pesach Pruskin

Personal life
- Born: 1879 Koshchino, Smolensky District, Smolensk Oblast
- Died: October 24, 1939 (aged 59–60)
- Spouse: Tziporah Pruskin (née Lipschutz)
- Children: R' Avraham; Rivka Zukovsky; R' Nosson Nota; R' Yehuda Leib
- Parents: Pesach (father); Rachel (mother)
- Education: Slabodka Yeshiva; Slutsk Yeshiva
- Occupation: Rabbi, Rosh yeshiva

Religious life
- Religion: Judaism
- Denomination: Orthodox Judaism
- Yeshiva: Kobrin
- Position: Rosh yeshiva
- Began: 1923
- Ended: 1939
- Other: Mashgiach at Slutsk Yeshiva; Rosh in Shklov/Amtsislav
- Yahrtzeit: 11 Cheshvan 5700
- Residence: Kobryn

Rabbi Pesach Pruskin was an Orthodox Jewish rabbi and rosh yeshiva in White Russia before World War II, most notably in Kobrin. He was known as one of the most brilliant Torah scholars of his time.

== Early life ==
Rabbi Pruskin was born in Koshchino [RU], Smolensky District, Smolensk Oblast, in the Russian Empire, to Rachel Palewsky, in 1879.> His father had died before he was born and so he was named after him. After his birth, the family moved to Antipole near Kobrin where Rachel's grandfather was a rabbi.

In his teens, he studied in the Radin Yeshiva before moving on to Yeshiva Knesses Yisrael of Slabodka, where he became a student of Rabbi Nosson Tzvi Finkel, known as the Alter of Slabodka (or "the Alter"). He also studied for a short time in the Kelm Talmud Torah. In 1897, the Alter sent fourteen of his top students to the Slutsk Yeshiva where they would become the nucleus of the new institution. Pesach Pruskin was among this group. After his marriage to Tziporah Lipschutz, he became a night watchman at an orchard, and spent much of his time studying and thinking, completing the Rambam's Moreh Nevuchim.

== Rabbinic career ==
It was during his tenure of watchman that Rabbi Isser Zalman Meltzer of the Slutsk Yeshiva asked him to return to the yeshiva and accept the post of mashgiach ruchani. Although he declined the invitation at first, he later accepted. Among his students in Slutsk were Moshe Feinstein, future posek and rosh yeshiva in America, who would consider Rabbi Pruskin his primary teacher. During his tenure in Slutsk, Rabbi Pruskin advanced significantly in Torah study, and soon became recognized as one of the most brilliant Torah scholars of his time.

On the advice of the Alter of Slabodka, Rabbi Pruskin left Slutsk to establish a new yeshiva in Shklov. Rabbi Meltzer selected a group of his premier students to join Rabbi Pruskin as the first students in Shklov, including Moshe Feinstein. In 1911, he was asked by the Jewish community of Mstsislaw (Amstislav) to become their rabbi. He responded that he would take the position on the condition that he could bring his yeshiva with him, a condition they accepted. Thus, Rabbi Pruskin and his students moved to Amstislav.

=== Kobrin ===
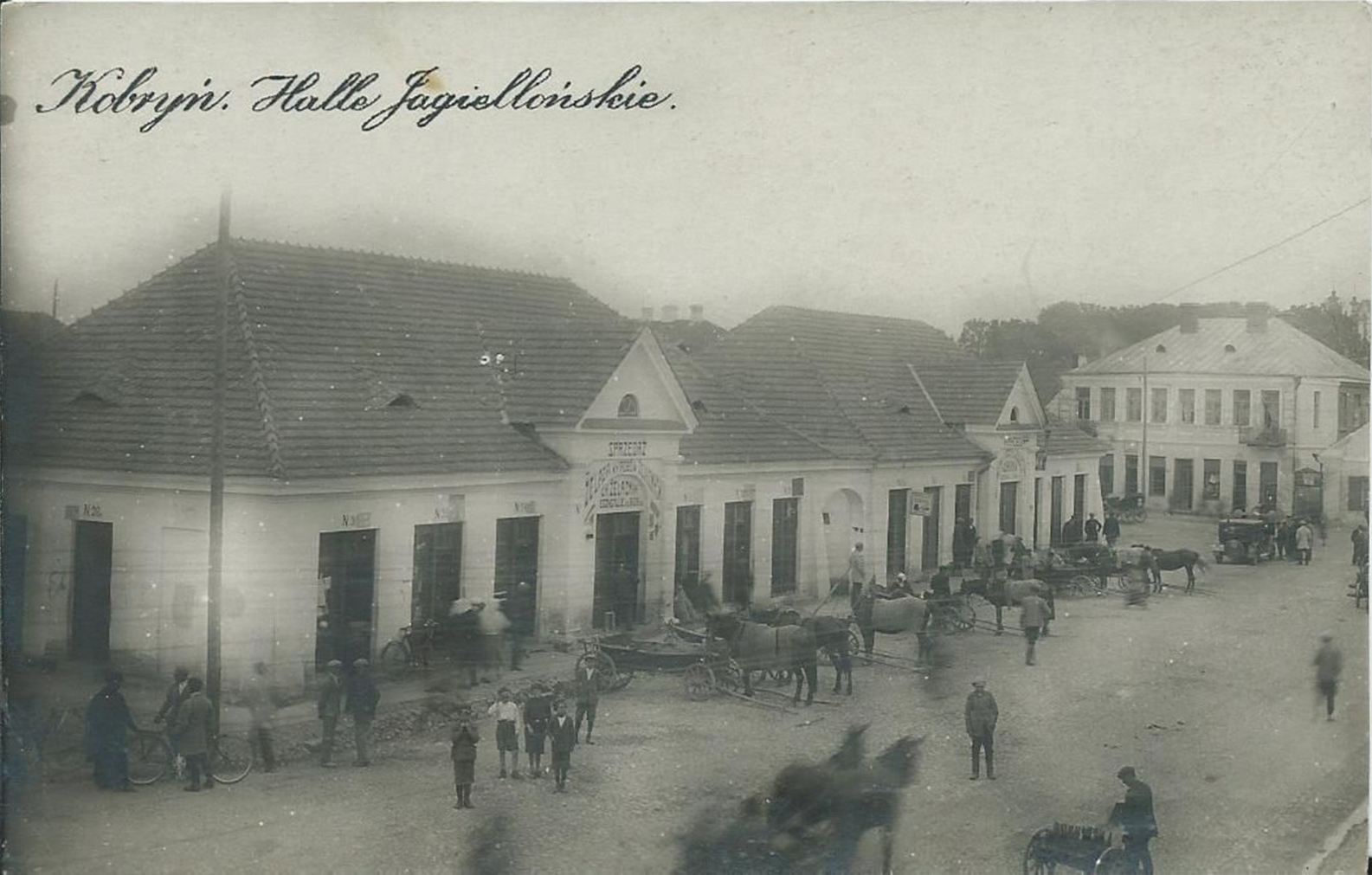
Kobryn, 1930s

When Amstislav came under Soviet rule, Rabbi Pruskin returned to his hometown of Kobrin, and after the death of the city's rabbi, Rabbi David Greenberg, he was appointed as rabbi. In 1923, he founded the Kobrin Yeshiva. Although the yeshiva served primarily younger students (aged thirteen to seventeen years old) to prepare them for study in other yeshivas, there were some students who remained into their mid-twenties. For many years, Rabbi Yosef Leib Nendik served as mashgiach ruchani, and Rabbi Shlomo Mattes also had a position on the yeshiva's faculty. The institution was relatively small, never exceeding a student body of one hundred.

In 1939, after the Soviet occupation of Poland, the government closed down the yeshiva as well as the city's beis yaakov, giving Rabbi Pruskin intense heartache that led to his death that year.

== Family ==
Of Rabbi Pruskin's three sons, only one survived the Holocaust, that being his son Rabbi Avraham Pruskin. He escaped to America with refugees from the Mir Yeshiva together with manuscripts of his father's classes, which were published by R' Pesach's grandson under the title Shiurei Maran Rav Pesach MiKobrin (Lectures of Rabbi Pesach of Kobrin). His daughter, Rivka Zukovsky, died in October 2004.
