= Chaim Yaakov Goldvicht =

Rabbi Chaim Yaakov Goldvicht חיים יעקב גולדויכט
- Title: Rosh Yeshiva of Yeshivat Kerem B'Yavneh

Personal life
- Born: September 1924 Jerusalem
- Died: 7 February 1994 (aged 69) Jerusalem
- Buried: Har HaMenuchot, Jerusalem

Religious life
- Religion: Judaism
- Denomination: Haredi

Jewish leader
- Position: Rosh Yeshiva
- Yeshiva: Yeshivat Kerem B'Yavneh

Rabbi Chaim Yaakov Goldvicht (Hebrew: חיים יעקב גולדויכט; September 1924 – February 7, 1994) was the founding Rosh yeshiva of Israel's first Hesder yeshiva, Yeshivat Kerem B'Yavneh, commonly known as KBY. A world-renowned scholar and teacher, Rabbi Goldvicht was also the author of Asufat Ma'arachot, a collection of thoughts on Torah and Jewish holidays. Rabbi Goldvicht's thousands of students have gone on to hold prominent posts in the Jewish and secular world.

== Biography ==
Chaim Yaakov Goldvicht was born in 1924 and grew up in Jerusalem. He studied at the Etz Chaim Yeshiva under Rabbi Isser Zalman Meltzer. He was also close to Rabbi Yitzchok Zev Soloveitchik, the "Brisker Rav." After marrying, he learned in Slabodka yeshiva (Bnei Brak), where he was mentored by the "Chazon Ish", Rabbi Avrohom Yeshaya Karelitz, leader of Israel's Haredi community.

His nephew is Rabbi Meir Goldwicht, a rosh yeshiva at Yeshiva University.

Rabbi Goldvicht died in Jerusalem on the 7th of Adar Alef, at the age of 69. He and his wife Miriam are survived by two children.

== Rabbinic career ==
In 1954, the heads of Bnei Akiva turned to Rabbi Goldvicht, then studying and teaching in a kollel in Bnei Brak, if he would accept the position of Rosh Yeshiva for a new Religious Zionist yeshiva - Yeshivat Kerem B'Yavneh. Before accepting, Rabbi Goldvicht asked the Chazon Ish for his advice. According to one account, the Chazon Ish told him: “If [the Religious Zionists] want to learn Torah, we need to help them.”

Rabbi Goldvicht took a critical part in establishing the Hesder yeshiva program with the Israel Defense Forces, and KBY became the first Hesder yeshiva, combining Torah study with active service in the Israeli army. In recognition of his contribution, he was awarded the Israel Prize in 1991, on behalf of the entire Yeshivat Hesder movement.
