= Moshe Nehemiah Kahanov =

Rabbi and Talmudist from Belarus

Moshe Nehemiah Kahanov משה נחמיה כהניו
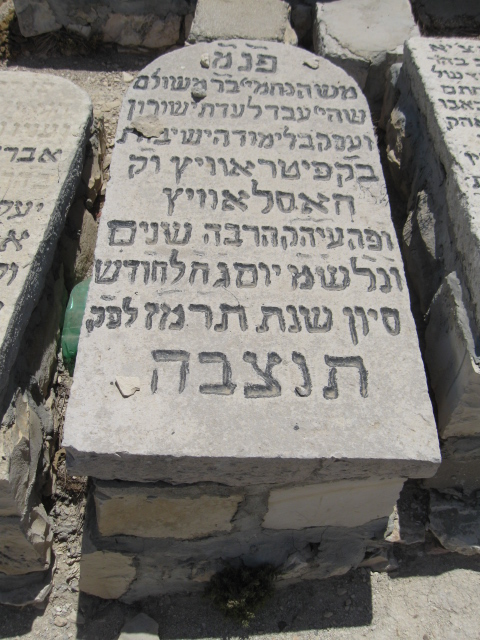
- Kahanov's grave at the Mount of Olives
- Title: Rabbi

Personal life
- Born: Moses Nehemiah Kahanov; 1817 Russian Empire
- Died: 1883 (aged 65–66)
- Buried: Mount of Olives, Jerusalem

Religious life
- Religion: Judaism
- Yeshiva: Etz Chaim Yeshiva
- Position: Rosh yeshiva

Rabbi Moshe Nehemiah Kahanov (Hebrew: משה נחמיה כהניו; 1817 – 1883) was a rabbi and Jerusalem Talmudist from the Russian Empire inside of what is now Belarus. Toward the end of his life he migrated to Jerusalem where he became Rosh Yeshiva of Etz Chaim Yeshiva.

== Biography ==
Kahanov was born in the Belarusian territory of the Russian Empire in 1817. He married at the age of 15 before moving to Petrovice, where after three years he became an assistant to the local rabbi. Several years later he became the rabbi of Khaslavich.

=== Immigration to Jerusalem ===
In 1864 Kahanov traveled to Jerusalem, where he was made Rosh yeshiva of Etz Chaim Yeshiva. While serving in this role he tried to expand the curriculum of the yeshiva to include Arabic on the recommendation of his associate Sir Moses Montefiore. Although he was forced to concede that the course should be dropped, because of pressures from traditionalists, Kahanov still pushed for the expansion of the Old Yishuv community, encouraging others to build homes outside of the Old City, like his which was located in Nahalat Shiv'a, and promoting the growth of industrial enterprise. His apparent alignment with progressive thinkers resulted in some people accusing him of secretly being a supporter of the Haskalah movement.

Kahanov died in 1883 while still serving as Rosh yeshiva.

== Works Written ==
Kahanov's writings included Netivot ha-shalom: ḥeleḳ sheni kolel siman 17 me-Even ha-ʻezer, a commentary on the Shulhan Arukh, along with other commentaries on various laws.

== Personal life and family ==
He married Hana Ania Kahanov, from whom he had children:

His eldest son born to him in Vilna, Rabbi Avraham Yaakov Kahanov. His second son, Rabbi Yosef Eliyahu Kahanov. His daughter, Bethia Rebecca Mendelsohn. His son-in-law, Rabbi Michal Liv HaCohen Katz, who was a revered hero among the old settlement, and the builder of the settlement Petah Tikva, and helped in the redemption of the lands of the Beit Tel Aviv estate and lands of settlements and neighborhoods throughout the country. His grandson, son of his son, Rabbi Avraham Yaakov Kahanov, is Fayvel Kahanov, founder of neighborhoods in Tel Aviv, Neveh Tzedek neighborhood.
