= White Shul =

Orthodox synagogue in Queens, New York

The White Shul Congregation Kneseth Israel
- Hebrew: ק׳׳ק כנסת ישראל

- Location within New York City

Religion
- Affiliation: Orthodox Judaism
- Ecclesiastical or organisational status: Synagogue
- Leadership: Rabbi Eytan Feiner; Rabbi Motti Neuburger
- Status: Active

Location
- Location: Far Rockaway, Queens, New York City, New York
- Country: United States
- Coordinates: 40°36′24″N 73°44′39″W

Architecture
- Type: Synagogue
- Established: 1922 (as a congregation)
- Completed: 1964

Website
- whiteshul.com

The White Shul, officially Congregation Kneseth Israel (Hebrew: ק׳׳ק כנסת ישראל), is an Orthodox Jewish congregation and synagogue located in Far Rockaway, in Queens, New York City, New York, United States. The congregation was established in 1922 as Talmud Torah Kneseth Israel and was nicknamed "The White Shul" after its white marble building. The original building located at Nameoke Street and Dinsmore Avenue was destroyed."

== History ==
Congregation Kneseth Israel, a 1922-founded Orthodox congregation, initially prayed in the Far Rockaway Chamber of Commerce building on Mott Avenue. When the members of the 1911-built Temple Israel synagogue, located at Roanoke Avenue and State Street (the names were later changed to Nameoke Street and Dinsmore Avenue) moved in 1930 to their new quarters on Central Avenue in Lawrence, they sold their old building to Congregation Kneseth Israel.

Due to this building's appearance (a "white colonial structure"), the shul began to be called The White Shul.

In 1964, Congregation Kneseth Israel moved into its present quarters at Empire Avenue and Sage Street, but the name "White Shul" is still in use, including as the name of their website.

The synagogue was affected by and recovered from Hurricane Sandy.

== Rabbis ==
The first Rabbi at Kneseth Israel was Rabbi Abraham B. Kahan. Hired in 1928, he had previously been the rabbi of the Kurlander Congregation in New York. Rabbi Kahan studied at the Lithuanian Yeshivos of Mir, Slabodka & Slutzk and trained for the rabbinate under Rabbi Chaim Ozer Grodzinski and was also the secretary of the Agudath Harabanim.

He was followed in 1931 by Shimshon Zelig Fortman, a Lithuanian rabbi who had also studied in Slutzk and was the father-in-law of Rabbi Moshe Sherer and Rabbi David B. Hollander.

The third and longest-serving rabbi at the White Shul was Rabbi Raphael Pelcovitz.

Pelcovitz was the shul's third rabbi, but the first to publicly speak in English. The two previous rabbis delivered their sermons in Yiddish.

Rabbi Tzvi Flaum served for 13 years, starting when Pelcovitz became rabbi emeritus. Rabbi Eytan Feiner, his successor, is the present rabbi.
