= Richard J. Israel (rabbi) =

American rabbi (1929-2000)

Richard James Israel (1929 – 2000) was an American rabbi, educator, civil rights activist, and author who worked in Jewish education and campus ministry and participated in the American civil rights movement.

== Early life and education ==
Richard James Israel was born in 1929 in Chicago, Illinois. He graduated from the University of Chicago in 1950. He then studied in Israel at Yeshivat Kerem B'Yavneh before being ordained at the Hebrew Union College-Jewish Institute of Religion in 1957. During that time he served as rabbi of the Bene Israel Congregation in Bombay, India.

== Career ==
Israel began his professional career as associate director of the Hillel Foundation at the University of California, Los Angeles (UCLA), from 1957 to 1959. He then served as the director of the Yale University Hillel Foundation for twelve years. In 1971, he became executive director of the Hillel Council of Greater Boston, a position he held for 14 years.

He was later affiliated with the Reconstructionist Rabbinical College, where he served as director of the Rabbinic Program for the College Campus. He was also a part of the Jewish Campus Activities Committee and worked with the Combined Jewish Philanthropies of Greater Boston.

=== Civil rights activism ===
In 1962, he participated in a clergy-led protest against segregation in Albany, Georgia, where he was arrested. Upon release, he spoke publicly about the religious and moral grounds for his activism.

== Writings and thought ==
Israel's best-known work, The Kosher Pig and Other Curiosities of Modern Jewish Life (1994), addresses questions of contemporary Jewish life.

Other works include:

- Jewish Identity Games: A How-To-Do-It Book (1978)
- The Jewish Mission to the Jews: The Context and Practice of Outreach (1985)
- The Promised Land of Milk and Date and Jam: The Problems of Bee-ing in the Bible and Talmud (1972)

His work was published in journals such as Religion and Kerem.

== Personal life ==
Israel married Sherry Israel, a professor and social psychologist who taught in the Hornstein Program at Brandeis University. He was also a beekeper and marathon runner.

He died in July 2000 while hiking on The Appalachian Trail in New Hampshire with his son.
