= Slutsk-Kletsk Yeshiva =

Kletsk-Slutsk Yeshiva מתיבתא רבתא עץ חיים דסלאצק
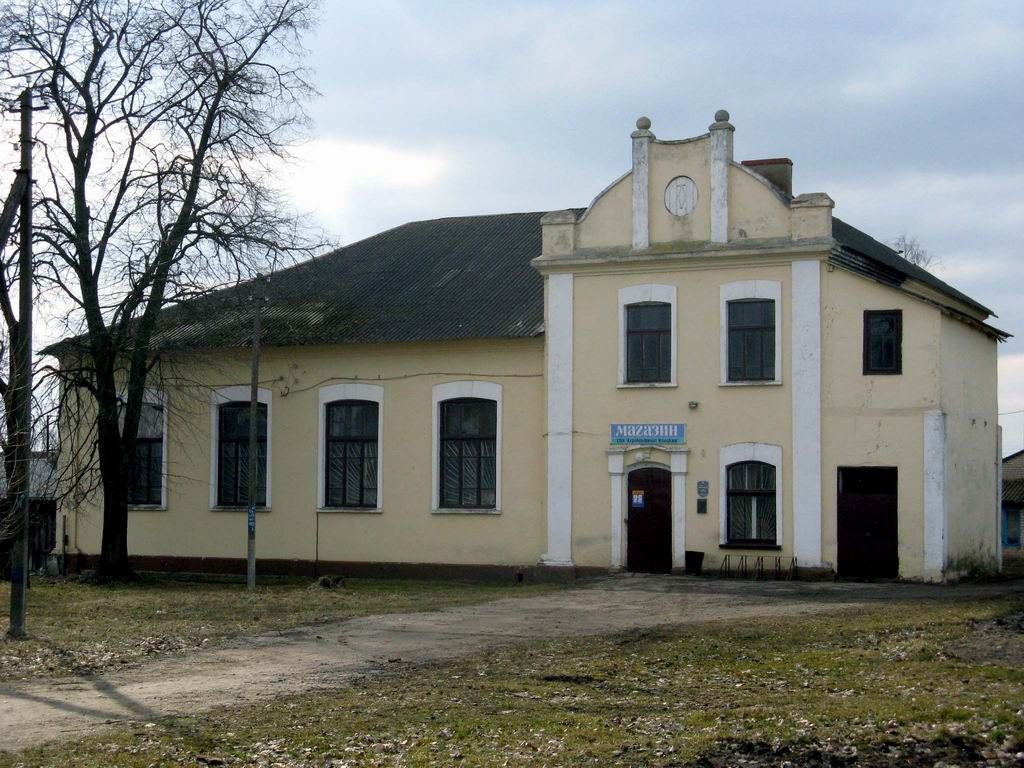
- Yeshiva Building in Kletsk, 2009

Location
- Slutsk, Kletsk; Belarus
- Coordinates: 53.1°N 26.6°E

Information
- Religious affiliation(s): Orthodox Judaism
- Established: 1897
- Founder: Rabbi Yaakov Dovid Willovsky
- Closed: c. 1941
- Faculty: Rabbi Isser Zalman Meltzer; Rabbi Aharon Kotler
- Enrollment: 260 (c. 1939)

Mesivta Rabsa Eitz Chaim DiSlutsk (Hebrew: מתיבתא רבתא עץ חיים דסלאצק), colloquially known as the Slutsk-Kletsk Yeshivah was an Orthodox Jewish yeshiva in Europe, founded in Slutsk, then part of the Russian Empire, and later moved to Kletsk in the Second Polish Republic, in 1897. The yeshiva was founded by the Ridvaz and famously led by Rabbi Isser Zalman Meltzer and Rabbi Aharon Kotler.

== Slutsk years ==
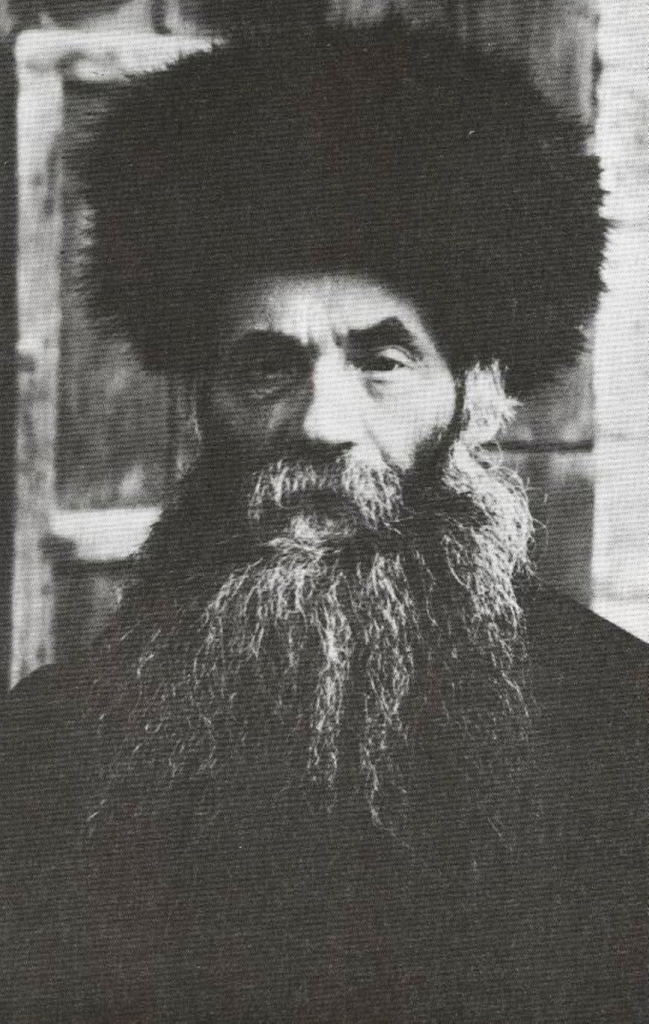
Rabbi Isser Zalman Meltzer

The yeshiva was founded in 1897 by Rabbi Yaakov Dovid Willovsky, known as the Ridvaz, who was the rabbi of Slutsk, in an effort to combat the influence of the maskilim in his town. He asked Rabbi Nosson Tzvi Finkel (the Alter of Slabodka), who was the rosh yeshiva of the Slabodka Yeshiva, to send him students to start off the yeshiva. The Alter immediately selected fourteen of his top students to go to Slutsk. Among the group were Rabbi Isser Zalman Meltzer, who would become the rosh yeshiva; Rabbi Pesach Pruskin; (Note: Although he was coming as a student at this time, Rabbi Pruskin would later return after his marriage and become the yeshiva's mashgiach ruchani) Rabbi Eliezer Yehuda Finkel; Rabbi Reuven Katz; Rabbi Alter HaLevi Shmuelevitz; Rabbi Yosef Konvitz; Rabbi Moshe Yom Tov Wachtfogel; Rabbi Shlomo Yehudah Leib Plutznick; and Rabbi Yitzchak Rubinstein. Over the next five years, the yeshiva grew to become one of the most respected yeshivos in the world. In 1903, with the departure of the Ridvaz from Slutsk, Rabbi Meltzer was appointed rabbi of the city as well.

In 1914, Rabbi Meltzer's daughter, Chanah Perel, married Aharon Kotler, a student of the Alter of Slabodka. Following the wedding, Rabbi Kotler joined Rabbi Meltzer in Slutsk, where he became rebbi (teacher of Torah) of the yeshiva's advanced students. He soon became more involved in the yeshiva and community, assisting his father-in-law in every aspect.

Later that year, World War I broke out, and the yeshiva fell into dire straits financially. Rabbi Meltzer was forced to avert much of the focus from teaching to fundraising, leaving Rabbi Kotler as sole rosh yeshiva. The war itself reached Slutsk with bombs blowing up in the streets, yet the yeshiva continued, with Rabbi Kotler giving hours-long shiurim (classes).

=== Communist revolution ===
With the Russian Revolution in 1917, all religious institutions were banned and Rabbi Meltzer was arrested many times, leaving Rabbi Kotler as rosh yeshiva once again. Nevertheless, the yeshiva remained in Slutsk for four more years, under Communist rule. Rabbi Kotler then convinced Rabbi Meltzer that the yeshiva should escape to the Polish city of Kletsk, where religion was legal.

== Kletsk ==
In 1921, Rabbi Kotler and 50 students managed to cross over the Russian-Polish border for Kletsk; (Rabbi Meltzer remained in Slutsk, for he felt he couldn't abandon the Jewish community there, as he served as community rabbi as well). The yeshiva settled in a communal property, which they soon outgrew. Rabbi Kotler therefore raised funds for the construction of a new building. The cornerstone was laid in 1927, and despite not having enough money to build the entire building, the construction continued and the yeshiva agreed to accumulate a large debt. In 1929, the building was completed and a festive chanukas habayis (building dedication) was held. Rabbi Meltzer, who had since moved to Palestine, came back to Europe for the celebration. The festivity was enormous, with participants filling the surrounding streets of the new yeshiva building. Many donated generously and the debt was soon paid up. At the outbreak of World War II, the yeshiva numbered two hundred sixty students.

=== World War II ===
With the outbreak of World War II in 1939, Kletsk fell under Soviet rule, and the yeshiva once again faced the threat of an anti-religious communist government. Yet, as they did in Slutsk, the yeshiva remained opened with a complete learning schedule, although many students left for home. However, Rabbi Kotler realized his life was in danger, not solely for running a religious institution, but because of his illegal escape from Russia nineteen years prior, and he therefore escaped to independent Lithuania with plans to only stay there temporarily before escaping the region for good. In Vilnius, Rabbi Kotler met Rabbi Chaim Ozer Grodzensky, who said that the entire yeshiva should leave Poland and come to Lithuania. Rabbi Kotler sent his students the message. Two nights later, the yeshiva's one hundred and fifty remaining students escaped to Baranovich. From there they traveled by train to Vilnius, where they were reunited with their rosh yeshiva. They then reopened the yeshiva in the village of Jonava on the outskirts of Kaunas. In 1940, the Soviets annexed Lithuania, and afraid, the yeshiva divided into three groups (to make it harder to destroy the entire yeshiva). Rabbi Kotler escaped Europe in 1941 and soon settled in the United States where he became the rosh yeshiva of Beth Medrash Govoha.
