= Raphael Pelcovitz =

Former rabbi of Far Rockaway's Congregation Knesseth Israel

Rabbi Raphael Pelcovitz (1921 - March 14, 2018), best known for his years as rabbi of Far Rockaway's Congregation Knesseth Israel (The White Shul) was also the author of four books published by ArtScroll.

== Biography ==
The Canton, Ohio born Pelcovitz was a student of Rabbi Shlomo Heiman at Yeshiva Torah Vodaath and also studied at the Chevron Yeshiva.

He "served several out-of-town synagogues before coming to the White Shul in 1951." Pelcovitz was the shul's third rabbi, but the first to publicly speak in English.

Part of his career included serving as a rebbi at Yeshiva Torah Vodaas.

One of his books, Balanced Parenting, he co-authored with his older son Dr. David Pelcovitz, a psychologist. Another was an acclaimed translation of Sforno on Chumash.

He was survived by his wife, their four children, and both grandchildren and greatgrandchildren.
