= Yaakov Dovid Wilovsky =

Ridvaz Yaakov Dovid Wilovsky יעקב דוד וילובסקי
- Title: Rabbi

Personal life
- Born: February 7, 1845 Kobrin, Russia
- Died: October 2, 1913 (aged 68)

Religious life
- Religion: Judaism
- Denomination: Orthodox Judaism

Jewish leader
- Position: founder
- Yeshiva: Slutsk-Kletsk Yeshiva

Rabbi Yaakov Dovid Wilovsky (Hebrew: יעקב דוד וילובסקי; February 7, 1845 – October 2, 1913), known by the acronym Ridvaz or Ridbaz, was a renowned rabbi, Talmudic commentator and educator.

== Biography ==
Wilovsky was born in Kobrin, Russia (modern-day Belarus) on February 7, 1845.

Wilovsky held Rabbinic posts in Izabelin (1874), Bobruisk (1876), and Vilna (1881). Finding that the Vilna position distracted him from his studies, he resigned, and chose to serve as rabbi in a smaller community such as Polotsk (1883) and Vilkomir (1887).

In 1890, he became chief rabbi of Slutsk, where he established a noted yeshiva in 1896. He took general supervision, appointing Rabbi Isser Zalman Meltzer as principal.

Title page from Teshuvos haRidvaz

Wilovsky freely used a copy of the Talmud Yerushalmi which the Vilna Gaon had annotated. After studying the Talmud Yerushalmi for thirty years and working steadily on his commentaries for seventeen years, Wilovsky began the publication of an edition of the Talmud Yerushalmi which included, besides his own, all the commentaries incorporated in former editions.

Since the subscription fund for his publication was exhausted before the fourth order Nezikin was completed, Wilovsky travelled to the United States in 1900, where he succeeded in securing subscriptions for many sets of the work. Returning to Russia, he dedicated the Nezikin order to his American patrons.

From 1903 to 1905, Wilovsky returned to the United States. This time, he dropped his former name of Willowsky/Willovsky and assumed the name "Ridvaz" (Rabbi Yaakov David ben Ze'ev").

The United Orthodox Rabbis of America, at their annual meeting in Philadelphia in August 1903, elected Ridvaz as their zekan haRabbanim (elder rabbi), and on September 8, 1903, Ridvaz was elected chief rabbi of the Russian-American congregations in Chicago.

He was critical of the absence of moral education received by traditional Jews in America's public schools and the emphasis on sports. He advocated for the creation of full time Jewish day schools that would integrate religious studies with English language and literature and American history. At the time there were no full time Jewish parochial schools in the country. He gained the critical support of Rabbi Bernard L. Levinthal during the August 1903 meeting in Philadelphia.

He tried to introduce order into the religious services of his congregations, but met obstruction and opposition on the part of a former rabbi and his followers. Unable to withstand the persistent opposition, Ridvaz resigned his position ten months later. Thereafter, he traveled extensively throughout the United States, lecturing and preaching. On returning to New York, he endeavored to establish a yeshiva based on the European model, but found little encouragement.

In 1905, Ridvaz left America and moved to Safed, where he established a yeshiva, Toras Eretz Yisrael. In 1909, he entered into controversy with Rabbi Avraham Yitzchak Kook over the proper observance of the Shemittah year, and, in particular, use of the "sale permit" known as the Heter mechira. The Ridbaz developed a close friendship with Rabbi Nachum Etrog, Chief Askenazi Rabbi of Safed, who become his assistant at Toras Eretz Yisrael. Under the tutelage of the Ridbaz, his son David Yitzhak Essrig became a famous Rabbi and author of Pri-Etz Hadar, a 7-volume encyclopedic commentary on the Jerusalem Talmud.

== Works ==
Ridvaz's most notable works were two commentaries on the Talmud Yerushalmi:

- Chiddushei Ridvaz, modelled on Rashi's commentaries to the Talmud Bavli, explained the literal meaning of the text;
- Tosfoth haRid (Piotrków, 1899–1900), modeled on the Tosafot. It compared and contrasted the significance of the text in question with other Talmudic and Halachic texts.

Ridvaz's other works include:

- Migdal Oz (1874)
- Migdal David (1874), novellae on both Talmuds;
- Chana David (1876), commentary on Tractate Challah;
- Teshuvoth haRidvaz (1881), responsa;
- Nimmuké Ridvaz (1904), commentary on the Torah;
- Beth Ridvaz, explanation of Rabbi Yisrael of Shklov's work Pe'ath Hashulchan.

== Family ==
=== Abramsky family ===
- Grandfather-in-law of Belarus-born Rabbi Yehezkel Abramsky who influentially headed the London Beth Din for 17 years. Wilovsky's daughter was married to Rabbi Yisroel Yehonasan Yerushamski; their daughter Hindl Reizel married Abramsky.
- Great-grandfather of Chimen Abramsky Professor of Jewish Studies at University College London and expert on rare Jewish books and socialist literature. Chimen was son of Yehezkel.
- Great-great-grandfather of Dame Jenny Abramsky, who as Director of Audio and Music was the most senior female employee of the BBC and currently serves as chairman of the UK's National Heritage Memorial Fund. Jenny is the daughter of Chimen.
- Great-great-grandfather of computer scientist and lecturer Samson Abramsky.
- Great-great-great grandfather of journalist and author Sasha Abramsky. Sasha is the son of Chimen's son Jack.

=== Konvitz family ===
- Father-in-law of Rabbi Joseph Konvitz, who was president of the Union of Orthodox Jewish Congregations of America in the 1930s and played an instrumental role in ending a kosher butcher strike.
- Grandfather of Philip Konvitz who was indicted for being deeply involved in New Jersey organized crime. Philip was a son of Joseph.
- Grandfather of Milton R. Konvitz, a founder of Cornell University's School of Industrial and Labor Relations. Milton was a son of Joseph.
- Great-grandfather of Josef W. Konvitz, historian and diplomat who served as Division Head of Urban Affairs and of Regulatory Policy at the OECD, 1992–2011.
