= Bezalel Zolty =

Israeli rabbi and rabbinical judge

Bezalel Zolty בצלאל ז'ולטי
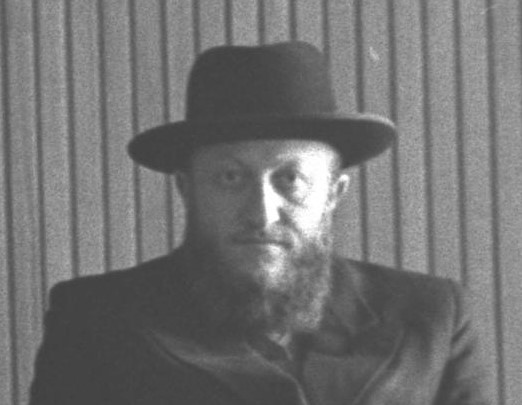

Personal life
- Born: 1920 Poland
- Died: 1982 (aged 61–62) Jerusalem, Israel
- Buried: Mount of Olives Jewish Cemetery, Jerusalem
- Education: Etz Chaim Yeshiva, Hebron Yeshiva

Religious life
- Religion: Judaism
- Denomination: Ashkenazi Haredi Judaism

Jewish leader
- Predecessor: Tzvi Pesach Frank
- Successor: Itzhak Kolitz
- Position: Chief Rabbi of Jerusalem
- Began: 1977
- Ended: 1982

Yaakov Bezalel Zolty (Hebrew: בצלאל ז'ולטי; June 30, 1920 - November 16, 1982) was an ultraorthodox Israeli rabbi who served as the Ashkenazi Chief Rabbi of Jerusalem and before that as a rabbinical judge on the Rabbinical Great Court of Appeals.

== Biography ==
He was born in Stawiski, near Łomża, Poland to Moshe Aryeh Zolty and Sarah Rachel (née Bledkowski). In 1927, at the age of seven, he immigrated with his family to British Mandate Palestine and settled in Jerusalem. As a child, he studied at the Etz Chaim Yeshiva, then at the Hebron Yeshiva, and was considered a prodigy.

In 1951, he began serving as a member of the Rabbinical Court in Tel-Aviv and then in Jerusalem, and in 1956, at the age of 36, he was appointed as a member of the Rabbinical Grand Court of Israel. He won the Rabbi Kook Prize for Torah literature twice in 1955 and 1964.

Rabbi Zolty came out strongly against the lenient ruling of Rabbi Shlomo Goren about the brother and sister whom he freed from mamzer status in 1973.

=== Chief rabbi of Jerusalem ===
In 1960, Rabbi Zvi Pesach Frank, the Ashkenazi rabbi of Jerusalem, died. Due to disagreements in the city's political establishment, the process of selecting his successor did not progress. More than a decade later, on Hanukkah 1971, prominent Haredi rabbis in Jerusalem, and members of Agudat Israel, unofficially crowned Rabbi Zolty as the rabbi of the city of Jerusalem.

In November 1977, Rabbi Zolty was officially elected Ashkenazi Rabbi of Jerusalem, after much lobbying by Rabbi Ovadia Yosef and representatives of Agudat Israel, that led the Israeli Labor Party to support Rabbi Zolty. His contestant was Dov Lior, who at the time served as rosh yeshiva of Nir Kiryat Arba, and a representative of the national religious community, and was supported by Rabbi Goren. Elected alongside him was the Sephardic Rabbi Shalom Messas.

Rabbi Zolty served as president of the Yad Aharon Yeshiva, headed by his son-in-law, Rabbi Yehoshua Eichenstein.

== Personal life ==
He was married to Esther (née Wexler). Among their children:

- Rabbi Aryeh - son-in-law of Yitzhak Hebroni, director of the Hebron Yeshiva (son of Rabbi Moshe Hebroni).
- Hannah Bat Shahar - Haredi writer, married to Rabbi Yehoshua Eichenstein, head of the Yad Aharon Yeshiva in Jerusalem.

He was buried in Mount of Olives Jewish Cemetery in Jerusalem.
