= Hannah Bat Shahar =

Israeli writer (born 1944)

- חנה בת שחר
- Born: 1944 (age 81–82); Jerusalem, Israel
- Occupations: Author, poet

Hannah Bat Shahar (Hebrew: חנה בת שחר) is the pen name of the Israeli writer Hannah Eichenstein.

Bat Shahar was born in Jerusalem, 1944.

She received the 1994 Prime Minister's Prize.

== Biography ==
Bat Shahar, was born in 1944 in Jerusalem, daughter of Rabbi Bezalel Zolty, who was the Chief Rabbi of Jerusalem. Married to Rabbi Yehoshua Eichenstein, head of the Yad Aharon yeshiva. She graduated from the Beit Ya'akov institutions, whose curriculum does not include modern Hebrew literature. In the 1980s, she enrolled in a writing workshop led by Yoram Kaniuk and Aharon Appelfeld. In 1995-2000 she studied literature in the Hebrew University and received an M.A. cum laude in 2000. She later began writing under a pseudonym, because she feared that her identification would lead to ostracism in ultra-orthodox society and harm her children's marriages.

She has 5 children. Her daughter Orian Lipshitz had left the Ultra-Orthodox world and is a theater director.

Regarding her literary writing under her pseudonym, she said in an interview: "I feel like a walking mask. This wig is a mask, these bourgeois clothes are a costume, and I hide behind a pseudonym. Even I don't always know who I am." Nevertheless, she said that from a religious point of view, she has "no heretical thoughts. I believe with all my heart."

She also said in another interview: "I won't ask a rabbi whether I'm allowed or not to publish my book, because asking is not kosher. So I'm not allowed to ask and I'm also afraid to ask. Because it's clear to me that the rabbis would tell me that it's forbidden, and what would I do then? I would either have to go against them or simply stop writing and die."

== Writing ==
In 1985, her first book, "The Tales of the Cup", including six short stories, was published and won the Newman Prize for Debut Books. Her next two books, "Calling the Bats" (1990) and "The Butterfly Dance" (1993) were published in the "Kav Hatefer" series edited by Yigal Schwartz at Keter Publishing.

In her early books, little emphasis was placed on the religious background, but later the subject took on a prominent significance. Bat Shahar deals with topics considered taboo in Haredi society.

She said that her writing is influenced by the revered father figure and the distant mother figure. She explained that most of her heroines are divorced, widowed, or unhappily married: "I don't believe that there is harmony in married life. In my community, it's a secret, but I have the tactile senses to feel it."

== Published works ==
- Sipurei Ha-Kos (Stories of the Owl), stories, Tcherikover, 1987
- Likroh La-Atalefim (Calling the Bats), stories, Keter, 1990
- Rikud Ha-Parpar (The Dancing Butterfly), stories, Keter, 1993
- Sham Sirot Ha-Dayig (Look, the Fishing Boats), three novellas, Hakibbutz Hameuchad/ Siman Kriah, 1997
- Yonkey Ha-Devash Ha- Metukim (Sweet Honey Birds), stories, Hakibbutz Hameuchad/Siman Kriah, 1999
- Ha-Naara Mi-Agam Mishigan (The Girl From Lake Michigan), novel, Hakibbutz Hameuchad/ Siman Kriah, 2002
- Nimfa Levana, Seira Meshugaat (White Nymph, Wild Satyr), novel, Hakibbutz Hameuchad, 2005
- Tzlalim Ba-Rei (Shadows in the Mirror), novel, Kinneret, Zmora-Bitan, Dvir, 2008

== See also ==
- Hebrew literature
