= Yedidia Stern =

Israeli jurist (born 1955)

- ידידיה שטרן

Personal life
- Born: England

Religious life
- Religion: Judaism

Jewish leader
- Position: President and CEO
- Organisation: Jewish People Policy Institute
- Residence: Jerusalem

Yedidia Stern (Hebrew: ידידיה שטרן; born 13 March 1955) is an Israeli jurist and legal scholar. He is an emeritus professor of law at Bar Ilan University and the president and CEO of the Jewish People Policy Institute.

== Biography ==
Yedidia Zvi Stern was born in England where his father was sent as an educational coordinator for the Jewish Agency. The family returned to Israel in 1958 and settled in Tel Aviv. He has a sister and two brothers. In 1973–1978, Stern studied at Yeshivat Kerem BeYavne, combining Talmudic studies with military service in the Israel Defense Forces, and then completed a law degree at Bar Ilan University. He worked as an intern for Shmuel Tamir, Chaim Herzog and Ya'akov Ne'eman. In 1986, he earned a Doctorate in Law from Harvard University. He then worked for Weil, Gotshal & Manges in New York, before returning to Israel.

== Legal and academic career ==
Stern is an emeritus professor in the Faculty of Law at Bar Ilan University. He was previously faculty dean.

In 1988-1992, he founded Bar Ilan University's Center for Commercial Law and served as its first director. In 2001, he established Tzivyon - Centre for the Study of Israel, Judaism and Democracy.

Stern was a senior fellow at the Israel Democracy Institute in 1989-2000 as well as the Institute's Vice President of Research for over a decade.

In 2009, Stern was appointed Sir Louis Matheson Distinguished Visiting Professor at Monash University as part of its Israel Studies program. In November 2009, Stern was one of four candidates short-listed for the position of Attorney General of Israel but withdrew his candidacy despite support from Israeli justice minister, Yaakov Neeman.

Stern has been president of the Jewish People Policy Institute since October 2020, replacing Avinoam Bar-Yosef. Stern is an expert on constitutional law. He was chairman of the Coalition Committee to Enact an Israeli Constitution. He was a member of the committee of experts who drafted "Constitution by Consensus," under Supreme Court president Meir Shamgar in 2002-2007.

During the countrywide protests over the proposal for judicial overhaul, Stern formed a group of law professors to formulate a solution under the aegis of Israeli president Isaac Herzog. His idea of a partial solution, which has been described as a "thin constitution," or a "procedural constitution," was presented to Justice Minister Yariv Levin, Stern's former student.

Stern is the co-editor of Democratic Culture, an interdisciplinary journal for studies on democratic culture in general and Israeli democracy in particular published by Bar Ilan University.

== Views and opinions ==
Stern believes in balancing modernity and tradition and coming to terms with Israel's cultural duality, i.e., being rooted in Jewish tradition but also embracing Western ideas. According to historian Gil Troy, he seeks to "separate Judaism from rabbinic coercion so that Israeli Judaism can flourish naturally, organically [and] popularly."

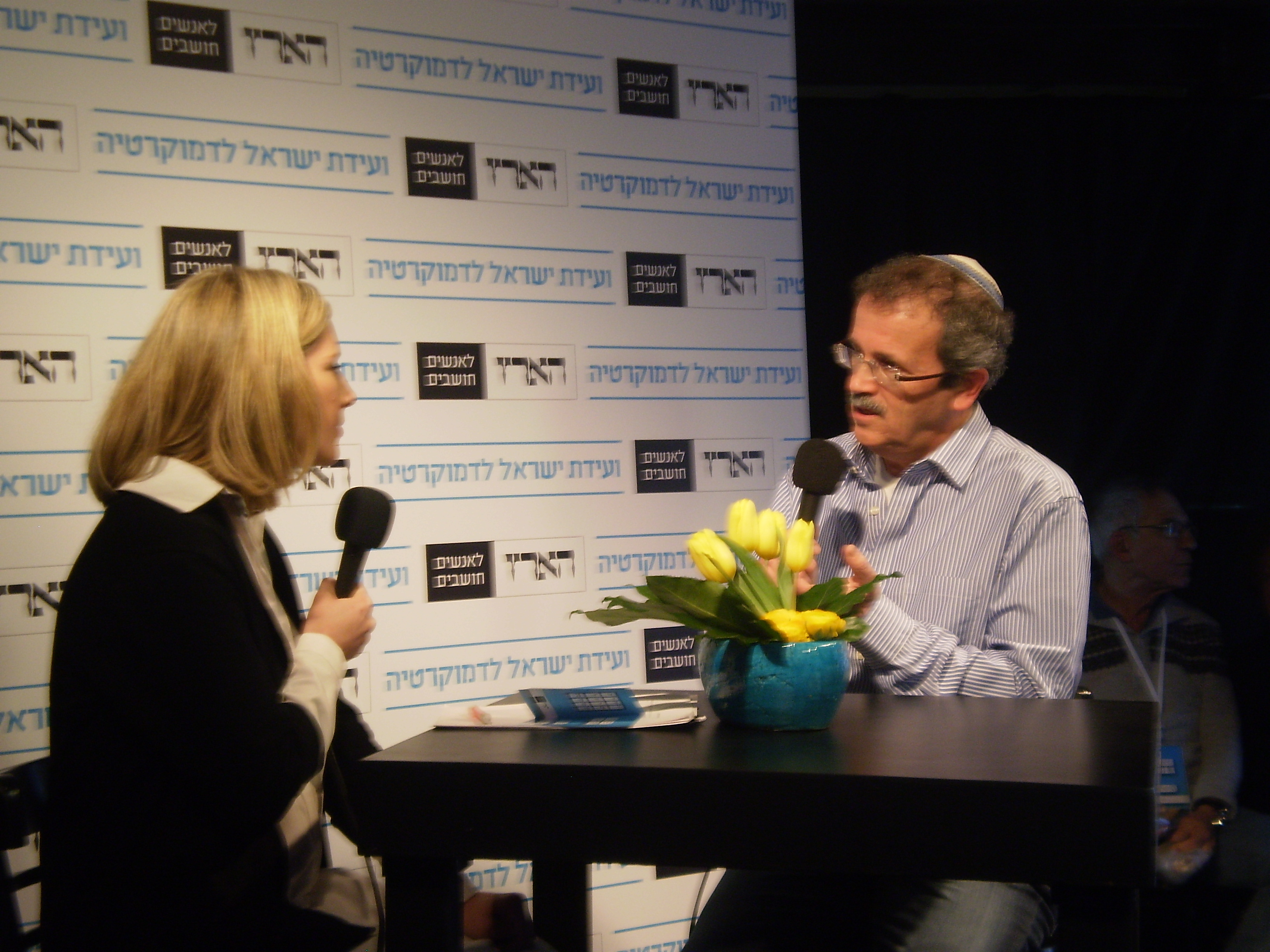
Yedidia Stern interview, 2015

On judicial reform in Israel, Stern thinks that Supreme Court judges should have term limits of 12 years. He is also in favor of the Knesset having the power to override court decisions on issues of identity, and asserts that the matter of human rights should be entrusted to the court, not a Knesset majority. However, where the decision hinges on Israel's character as democratic and Jewish (as in the case of the Haredi draft, for example), he believes the Knesset should have the last word.

According to Stern, the goal is "find a feasible vision that all of Israel's citizens can get behind, which balances the need for a Jewish character for the state with the equally important values of democracy and equality." He believes that a constitution is the best means of achieving this aim, even if takes time. Stern agrees that the court's justices should not be beholden to political sides and interests: "My fear is that by putting the power of selection into the hands of our politicians," the result will be the radicalization of the court, and its failure to protect the rights of vulnerable minorities."

In Stern's view, the mission at hand is to work out how people who disagree can live together despite the disputes. As he puts it: "Divided we stand, but we stand together. That is the real issue at the heart of what is going on in Israel now. To achieve this, he recommends the embrace of mamlachtiyut, a Hebrew term that roughly translates as statehood, in which partisan differences are set aside for the sake of the state.

== Public leadership roles ==
Stern has been on the directorate of Bank Leumi since 2019.

== Published works ==
=== Books ===
- A Jewish State - 75 Perspectives (eds. Aharon Barak, Judah Reinharz, Yedidia Stern) Academic Studies Press (2023)
- Commentary on the Basic Law: Israel The Nation-State of the Jewish People (eds. Yedidia Stern, Yuval Shany) Israel Democracy Institute Press (2023) [Hebrew]
- The Temple Mount: Between Dream and Reality (ed. Yedidia Stern) Israel Democracy Institute Press (2022) [Hebrew]
- A Nation State in the 21st Century (eds. Yedidia Stern, Shuki Friedman, Jesse Ferris) Israel Democracy Institute Press (2022) [Hebrew]
- Jewish, Haredi, and Democratic: the State of Israel Through Haredi Eyes (eds. Yedidia Stern, Nechumi Yafe, Gilad Malach, Asaf Malachi) (2021) [Hebrew]
- Mamlachtiyut in the 21st Century. Yedidia Stern. Israel Democracy Institute Press (2021) [Hebrew]
- Religion, State, and the Jewish Identity Crisis in Israel The Brookings Institution (2017)
- Conversion in Israel: Vision, Achievements and Challenges (eds. Yedidia Stern and Netanel Fisher) Israel democracy Institute Press (2018) [Hebrew]
- In Search of Solidarity: An Israeli Journey (eds. Yedidia Stern and Benjamin Porat) Israel Democracy Institute Press (2014) [Hebrew]
- A Framework for Ultra-Orthodox Conscription. Yedidia Stern and Haim Zicherman. Israel Democracy Press (2013) [Hebrew]
- Jewish Law and Zionism: Halakhic Ramifications of National Sovereignty (eds. Yedidia Stern, Yair Sheleg) Israel Democracy Institute Press (2017) [Hebrew]
- Rabbis and Rabbinate: The Challenge. Yedidia Stern and Shuki Friedman, Israel Democracy Press (2011) [Hebrew]
- My Justice, Your Justice: Justice Between Cultures. Zalman Shazar Center and Israel Democracy Institute (2010)
- State, Law, and Halakhah: Facing Painful Choices: Law and Halakhah in Israeli Society (3 volumes) (2002) [English and Hebrew]
- When Judaism Meets a State Israel Democracy Institute Press and Yedioth Books (with Kalman Newman, Benjamin Brown, Nir Kedar, Gideon Katz) (2015) [Hebrew]
- Nation State and Immigration--The Age of Population Movements Sussex Academic Press (eds. Anita Shapira, Yedidia Z. Stern, Alex Yakobson, Liav Orgad). (2014)
- The Israeli-Nation-State: Political, Constitutional and Cultural Challenges Academic Studies Press (eds. Fania-Oz-Salzberger and Yedidia Z. Stern) (2014) [English and German)

=== Journals ===
- "The Relevance of Rabbinic Leadership," Azure, Autumn 5772/2011, no. 46

== Awards and recognition ==
- Zeltner Prize for excellence in legal research in Israel (2009)
- Gorni Prize for special contribution in public law (2012)

== Personal life ==
Stern is married to Karen Friedman Stern, a psychologist, with whom he has eight children. The family lives in Jerusalem.
