= Henry Abramson =

American academic, historian

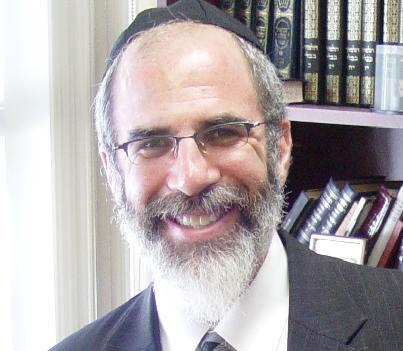
- Born: 1963 (age 62–63)
- Education: Ph.D. (University of Toronto, 1995)
- Occupations: Dean of Lander College of Arts and Sciences
- Website: https://henryabramson.com/

Henry Abramson (born 1963) is an Orthodox Jewish historian who is the dean of the Lander College for Men at Touro College in Flatbush, New York. Before that, he served as the Dean for Academic Affairs and Student Services at Touro College South in Miami. Both are part of the Touro University System.

In 2024 he became dean of Touro’s Lander College for Men.

Abramson is primarily known for his scholarship in Ukrainian Jewish history and antisemitic iconography. Abramson also was curator for an exhibit on the history of antisemitic iconography in Florida entitled "The Art of Hatred".

Abramson wrote a book on Kalonymus Kalman Shapira, a Hasidic rabbi in the Warsaw Ghetto during the Holocaust.
