= Etz Chaim Yeshiva =

Orthodox yeshiva in Jerusalem

Coordinates: 31.7853°N 35.2133°E

Etz Chaim Yeshiva (Hebrew: ישיבת עץ חיים, Yeshivat Etz Hayyim, lit. "Tree of Life Yeshiva") was an orthodox yeshiva located on Jaffa Road close to the Mahane Yehuda Market in downtown Jerusalem.

== History ==
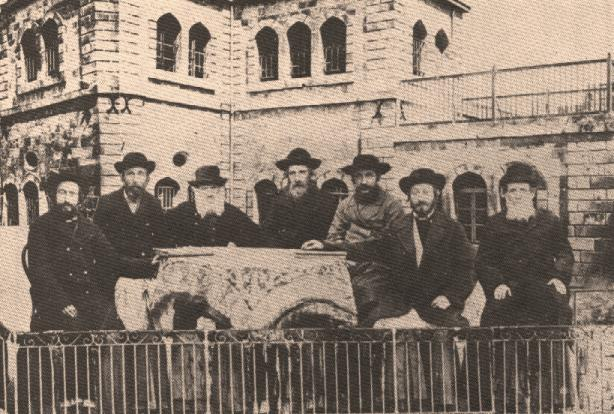
Early 20th century photograph of teachers at the Etz Chaim Yeshiva located in the Hurva Synagogue complex.

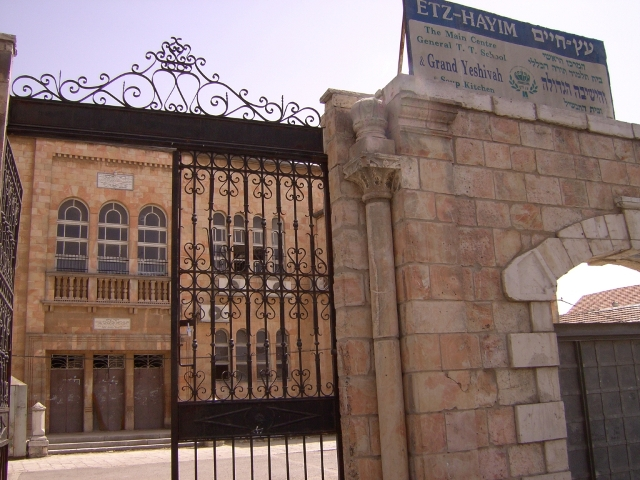
The building on Jaffa Road, 2010.

Etz Chaim Yeshiva was originally a Talmud Torah that was established in 1841 by the Chief Rabbi of Jerusalem, Shmuel Salant. For the first two years classes were held in various rooms throughout the Old City. In 1857, the yeshiva consolidated into a group of buildings adjacent to the Hurva Synagogue, sharing the premises with the Beth Din of Jerusalem. It was at this stage that the institution was renamed "Etz Chaim Yeshiva." The first permanent home of the yeshiva was financed by Rabbi Tzvi Zeev Fiszbejn (Fishbein in English), a wealthy brush maker originally from Miedzyrzec Podlaski in what is today Poland, who donated a thousand rubles in silver to Rabbi Salant for that purpose in 1863.

Moshe Nechemiah Kahanov led the school from 1867 to his death in 1886 and was as concerned with the progress of his average students as with the gifted.

The head teacher was Rabbi Chaim Mann. His brother Yehuda Leib Mann was the secretary who also served as a teacher. They were the sons of Rabbi Yaakov Mann, who was a prominent scholar who had declined the invitation of Rabbi Tzvi Pesach Frank to become a dayan on the Beth Din. (He went on to build the Sha'arey Tzedek Medical Center and the Lämel School, often misspelled 'Lemel school'). Frank was in turn appointed judge at the recommendation of Rabbi Yechiel Michel Tucazinsky, who was rosh yeshiva of Etz Chaim starting around the turn of the 19th century.

As the yeshiva expanded, Tucazinsky acquired a plot of land on Jaffa Road in 1908 for it, though the yeshiva maintained an ownership claim on the Hurva complex. After the opening of the Jaffa Road location, a kollel was subsequently established, catering mainly to the alumni of the yeshiva.

After disputes arose between the pupils and the faculty, a permanent agreement was reached by Rabbi Tzvi Pesach Frank, who reallocated the positions of authority.

In 1925, Rabbi Isser Zalman Meltzer was appointed to lead the yeshiva and Rabbi Aryeh Levin was made the mashgiach. After the death of Rabbi Meltzer, his son-in-law, Rabbi Aharon Kotler, was appointed rosh yeshiva. In an unusual arrangement, he held this position while continuing to live in the United States, and visited Jerusalem on occasion. During the periods when he resided in Israel, he delivered fortnightly lectures.

After the death of Rabbi Kotler, Rabbi Elazar Shach was chosen to head the yeshiva, and he also delivered fortnightly lectures. Some time later, Rabbi Yisroel Yaakov Fisher took up a position at the yeshiva. A grandson of Rabbi Aharon Kotler, Rabbi Zvulun Schwartzman, has served as one of the primary leaders.

A great-grandson of Rabbi Salant, Rabbi Nissan Tikochinsky, the son of Rabbi Yechiel Michel Tucazinsky, served as head and director of the institution until his death in 2012. For many years he traveled to the United States and South Africa to raise money to keep the institution functioning.

== Threat of demolition ==
Although the yeshiva building on Jaffa Road is registered on Jerusalem's List of Protected Monuments, in 2007 the building was under the threat of demolition to make way for shops and offices. The authorities accepted an appeal for the buildings' preservation.

== Notable students ==
- Rabbi Shlomo Zalman Auerbach (1910-1995)
- Rabbi Yitzchak Dovid Grossman
- Rabbi Yitzchok Zilberstein
- Rabbi Betzalel Zolty
