= Jewish People Policy Institute =

Israel-based think tank

- המכון למדיניות העם היהודי
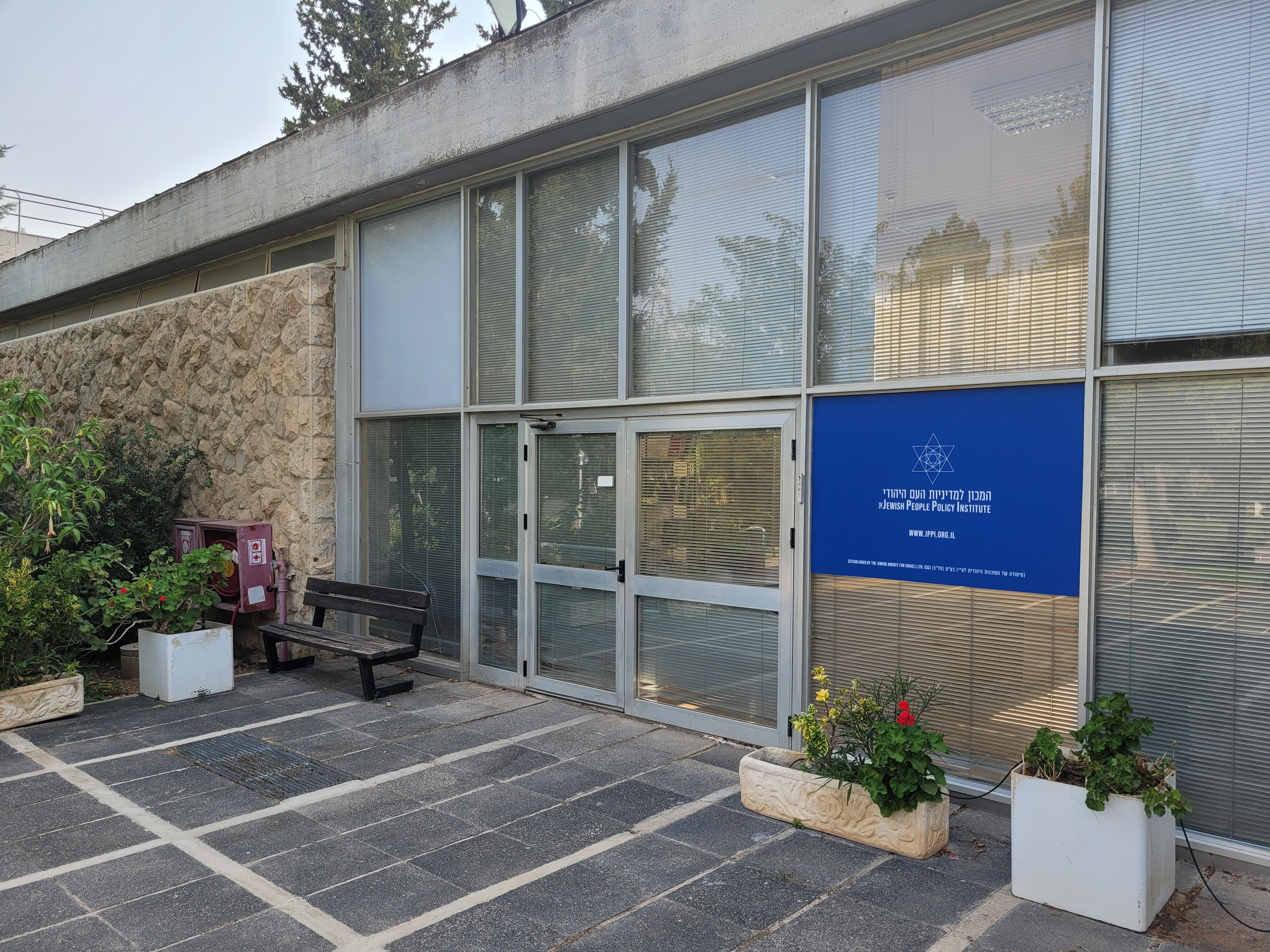
- The sign of the institute on its building in Jerusalem
- Founded: 2002; 24 years ago
- Headquarters: Jerusalem, Israel
- President and CEO: Yedidia Stern
- Website: www.jppi.org.il

The Jewish People Policy Institute (JPPI; Hebrew: המכון למדיניות העם היהודי; formerly: The Jewish People Policy Planning (JPPPI)) is an Israel-based think tank that produces strategic research and policy recommendations regarding the Jewish people and Israel, with the purpose of promoting and securing the Jewish people and Israel.

Founded by the Jewish Agency in 2002, it became independent in 2013.

== History ==
The Jewish People Policy Institute (JPPI) is a think tank founded by the Jewish Agency in 2002 to protect and advance the Jewish people and Israel.

As a think tank focused on developing policies for the Jewish world, its main focuses are the future of the Jewish people and Israel's security. Staff conduct research, analysis, and make policy recommendations on issues such as world Jewry, the delegitimization of Israel, Israel-diaspora relations, and the Israeli political process.

JPPI was founded in 2002 by the Jewish Agency for Israel, and is run as an independent body. It is headed by a board of directors that in 2013 was chaired by Dennis Ross, the special advisor for the Persian Gulf Southwest Asia in U.S. President Barack Obama's administration.

The president of JPPI is Yedidia Stern, who replaced Avinoam Bar-Yosef in 2020.

== Noticeable fellows ==
Here is a partial list of the JPPI fellows from over the years:

- Yaakov Katz, author and journalist
- Major-General (ret.) Amir Eshel
- Tamar Ish-Shalom, journalist
- Prof. Yaffa Zilbershats
- Shmuel Rosner, journalist, writer and editor
- Prof. Gil Troy, historian, author and scholar
- Einat Wilf, former member of Knesset
