= Yonason Sacks =

Yonason Avner Sacks (born 1962) is an Orthodox rabbi and the Rosh Yeshiva of Lander College for Men, a division of Touro University, as well as the spiritual leader of the Agudas Yisroel Bircas Yaakov in Passaic, New Jersey.

== Family ==
Sacks' grandfather, Rabbi Menachem Benzion Sacks, founded the Associated Talmud Torah in Chicago, Illinois. His great-grandfather was the Chief Rabbi of Jerusalem, Rabbi Tzvi Pesach Frank. Sacks dedicated his first book, Chemdas Yomim (focusing on the laws of the Sabbath) in memory of his father.

== Education ==
Sacks attended the high school headed by Rabbi Shlomo Riskin and Rabbi Pinchas Bak in Riverdale, New York in the mid-1970s.

Sacks graduated from Yeshiva University in 1981 and was ordained by the university's affiliated Rabbi Isaac Elchanan Theological Seminary in 1984. Two years later, he was awarded yadin yadin semicha.

== Rosh Yeshiva ==
Sacks was rosh yeshiva at Yeshiva University from 1994 until 2012, when he became rosh yeshiva at Beis Midrash L'Talmud, a part of Lander College, a division of Touro University.

== Works ==
Sacks is the author of more than 45 Jewish books, including:

- Hagadas Chazon L'Yomim (Hebrew and English)
- Chazon L'Yomim 1, 2 & 3 on Tractates Pesachim and Beitzah
- Chemdas Yomim on the laws of Shabbos
- Orchos Yomim on kriyas shema and shmoneh esrei
- Yimei Temimim on Pirkei Avos
- Yimei HaPurim on the holiday of Purim
- Yimei HaSefira on the days of Sefirat Ha'omer
- Yom HaZikaron on the holiday of Rosh Hashanah
- Yimei Chanuka on the holiday of Chanukah
- Vihigasa Bo Yomam Valaya, a three-part series on mitzvos, Torah study, and middos (traits)
