= Isser Zalman Meltzer =

Russian rabbi, rosh yeshiva, and posek (1870–1953)

Rabbi Isser Zalman Meltzer איסר זלמן מלצר
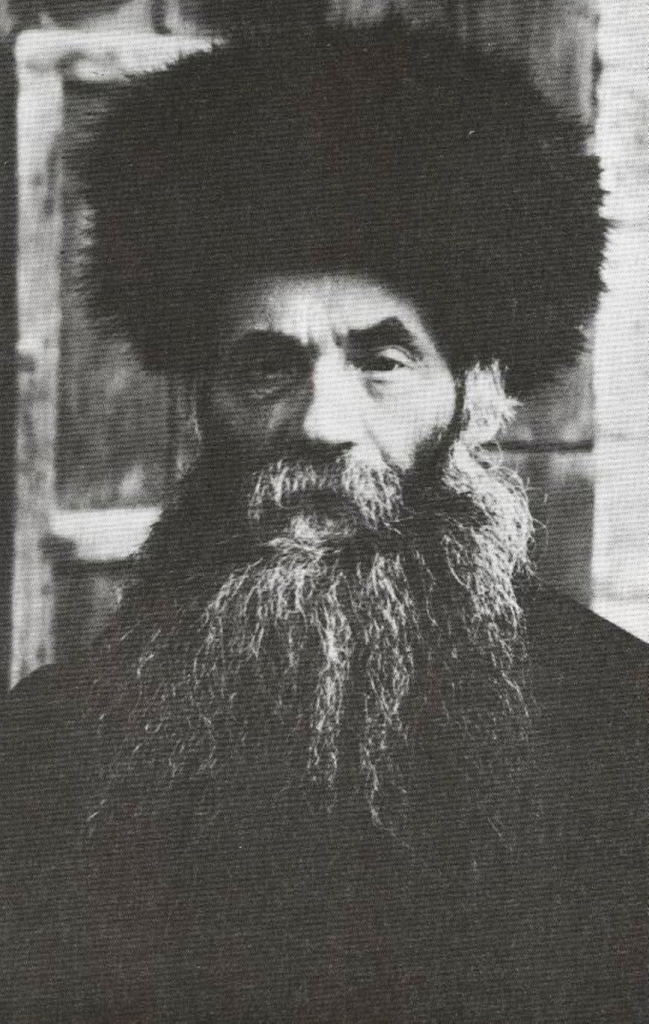
- Rabbi Isser Zalman Meltzer

Personal life
- Born: February 6, 1870 Mir, Russian Empire
- Died: November 17, 1953 (aged 83) Jerusalem, Israel
- Buried: Har HaMenuchot cemetery, Jerusalem, Israel
- Spouse: Beila Hinda

Religious life
- Religion: Judaism
- Denomination: Orthodox

Jewish leader
- Position: Rosh Yeshiva
- Yeshiva: Etz Chaim Yeshiva

Isser Zalman Meltzer (Hebrew: איסר זלמן מלצר; February 6, 1870 – November 17, 1953), was a Jewish rabbi, rosh yeshiva and posek. He was known as the "Even HaEzel", after the title of his commentary on Rambam's Mishneh Torah.

== Biography ==
=== Early years ===
Meltzer was born in the city of Mir in the Russian Empire, to Baruch Peretz and Mirel, who were from the Hutner family. He was the youngest child of nine children who died in infancy and one surviving sister. At age ten, he began studying with the rabbi of Mir, Yom Tov Lipmann Baslianski, author of "Malbushei Yom Tov," who raised him in his home. He later studied at the Mir Yeshiva.

At fourteen, in 1884, he began his studies at Volozhin Yeshiva, under the leadership of the Netziv and Rabbi Chaim Soloveitchik, where he studied for seven years. When he entered the yeshiva, he was the youngest student. He was called "Zonia Mir'er," after his town. He shared a room with Rabbi Zelig Reuven Bengis, who was then one of the senior students at the yeshiva and took him under his wing. He distinguished himself in his early years, and Rabbi Soloveitchik sought to discuss Torah with him, saying that conversation with him opened new channels of thought. While a student there, he was also active in a secret Hovevei Zion movement called "Nes Ziona", and together with his brother-in-law, Rabbi Moshe Mordechai Epstein, was among the founders of Hadera, where he bought a plot of land and planted etrog orchards.

=== Marriage ===
He married Bila Hinda, daughter of the wealthy Shraga Feivel Frank from Alexot in Kovno. When Frank died, his widow Golda sought to fulfill his will by marrying their daughters to outstanding Torah scholars. She traveled to Volozhin Yeshiva to find a match for her first daughter, and there the yeshiva head - Rabbi Naftali Zvi Yehuda Berlin deliberated between Rabbi Moshe Mordechai Epstein and Rabbi Isser Zalman Meltzer. She invited her brother-in-law - Rabbi Zevulun Leib Barrett, rabbi of Plungian and her sister's husband - to examine both of them, but he found it difficult to decide. When she, her brother-in-law and the two students traveled to Rabbi Yitzchak Elchanan Spektor in Kovno, he also found it difficult to choose between them. Finally, he asked if she had another daughter at home who needed to marry, and indeed in 1892, daughter Chaya Menucha married Rabbi Moshe Mordechai Epstein, and daughter Bila Hinda married Rabbi Isser Zalman Meltzer.

During his engagement, he went to study at Radin Yeshiva under the Chofetz Chaim. He rented a room from a butcher who would spread the hides from his slaughtered animals by Meltzer's window. Rabbi Meltzer, who was sickly and sensitive, weakened due to the smell and bacteria, but refused to leave and harm the butcher's livelihood. As a result, he contracted tuberculosis and returned to his parents' home in Mir. He sent a letter to his bride's family about his medical condition and asked them to reconsider the engagement. His bride's family sent him funding for medical treatment while pressuring the bride to cancel the match. The bride refused to give him up, despite the doctors' pessimistic predictions. The Chofetz Chaim blessed her that he would live long, and indeed at her insistence the match continued, and after he recovered they married.

During the siege of Jerusalem in the War of Independence in 1947, at age 77, he was wounded in his leg. While recovering at his son-in-law's home in Petah Tikva, a yeshiva student and Haganah member Tuvia Preschel visited and testified that his wife, who edited his books and documented his conversations, stayed busy straightening wrapping paper so they could continue writing Torah insights, as writing paper had run out in the market.

=== Slobodka and Slutsk Yeshivas ===
Following his marriage, Rabbi Meltzer was influenced by the Musar movement, to which his father-in-law and brother-in-law were close, and to its leader Rabbi Israel Salanter. He was a student of Rabbi Nosson Tzvi Finkel, the Alter of Slobodka, and was appointed as rosh yeshiva in Slobodka from 1894 to 1897, already at age 24.

In 1897, the rabbi of Slutsk, Yaakov Dovid Willows (the Ridbaz), established a local yeshiva that served as a 'branch' of Slabodka Yeshiva, and Rabbi Meltzer was appointed to lead it.

After the Ridbaz moved to Chicago in the United States (and later to Safed in Land of Israel), Rabbi Meltzer was appointed as rabbi of Slutsk in 1903, and served in this position for twenty years. After the rise of the Soviet regime in the Soviet Union, Rabbi Meltzer suffered persecution and was arrested several times. Because of this, he fled in 1923 to Kletzk in Poland, where he served as head of the exiled Slutsk Yeshiva - "Etz Chaim," together with his son-in-law, Rabbi Aharon Kotler, and his close student and sister's son-in-law, Rabbi Elazar Menachem Man Shach. During the Slutsk period, he initiated the printing of the rabbinical journal "Yagdil Torah", and also served as its editor.

=== Immigration to the land of Israel and final years ===
In 1925, he was appointed as head of Etz Chaim Yeshiva in Jerusalem, and served in this position until his death. He lived in the Ohel Moshe neighborhood in what is now known as Nachlaot in a building built and dedicated by the philanthropist Shraga Feivel Jacobson on a street that is now named after him (the adjacent building now houses the 'Lev Ha'ir' community center). According to Rabbi Berlin's will, his library was to be left to the next resident if he would be an outstanding Torah scholar, and indeed the library was left to Rabbi Meltzer. After his passing, the library was transferred to Etz Chaim Yeshiva.

Meltzer was a friend and admirer of Abraham Isaac Kook, the chief rabbi of Israel and a self-avowed supporter of Zionism. Meltzer once said to the famous sage Rabbi Chaim Ozer Grodzinsky of Vilna, “We are considered Torah giants only up until the point that we reach the door of Rabbi Kook’s room.”

He died in Jerusalem, Israel on Tuesday, 10th of Kislev 5714, November 17 1953, at age 83. His funeral was held on the day of his death and was attended by approximately 20,000 people. During the funeral, confrontations developed between police forces and participants who belonged to the Neturei Karta movement. He was buried on Har HaMenuchot.

Streets were named after him in Bnei Brak, Jerusalem (Even Ha'Ezel Street, after his book and his residential street - Ha'Ari) and in Rehovot (HaRa"z Street, an acronym for Rabbi Aiser Zalman), where his son Rabbi Tzvi Yehuda Meltzer served as Chief Rabbi.

The Even Ha'Ezel Yeshiva for young students was established in his name next to Yeshivat HaNegev in Netivot, and in 2015 the yeshiva moved to Modi'in Illit.

== Public activity ==
He joined Agudat Yisrael from its founding day. He participated in all three of its world congresses, and in his final years served as chairman of the "Moetzes Gedolei HaTorah" until his death. He held a positive stance regarding the future State of Israel, and encouraged Agudah members to take concrete actions to settle the Land of Israel. In his last year, he met with Prime Minister Ben-Gurion to express his protest against the intention to implement mandatory conscription and National Service for women, which he ruled as forbidden with the severity of "yehareg ve'al ya'avor" (die rather than transgress). He was among the founders of the "Vaad HaYeshivos" in Vilna, together with the "Chofetz Chaim" and Rabbi Chaim Ozer Grodzinski, and served as president of the Vaad HaYeshivos in the Land of Israel.

== His works ==
His Torah works that made him famous in the yeshiva world were his commentary Even Ha'Ezel (in seven volumes) on the Mishneh Torah and Notes and Explanations on Ramban's Novellae on the Babylonian Talmud. In the introduction to his book, he thanks his wife Bila-Hinda for her help in transcribing his manuscript and preparing it for print, and even working on its distribution. He twice won the Rabbi Kook Prize for Torah literature, about which he remarked that he accepted it to elevate the prize's importance so that young scholars would strive harder to win it.

The first volume of Even Ha'Ezel was published in 1935 and the final volume of Even Ha'Ezel on the Rambam's orders of Nashim and Kedushah, was published after his death, with an introduction by Rabbi Elazar Menachem Shach, his student and nephew-in-law, at the beginning of the book.

== Family ==
- His daughter Chana Pearl married Rabbi Aharon Kotler, head of Kletzk Yeshiva in Lithuania and founder of Beth Medrash Govoha in Lakewood, New Jersey, United States.
  - Her son Rabbi Shneur Kotler served as head of Lakewood Yeshiva, and after him his son Rabbi Aryeh Malkiel Kotler serves as head of the yeshiva
- His son, Rabbi Tzvi Yehuda Meltzer, rabbi of Rehovot and founder of "Yeshivat HaDarom".
  - His son-in-law Rabbi Yehuda Amital, head of Yeshivat Har Etzion.
- His son, educator and Bible commentator Feivel Meltzer, principal of "Ruchama" school, lecturer of the daily Bible lesson on "Kol Yerushalayim," member and co-founder of Da'at Mikra editorial board, and author of the commentary on Book of Ruth within it.
- His son-in-law, Rabbi Yitzchak Meir Ben Menachem (Pachiner), head of rabbinical court of Petah Tikva, and judge in the Great Rabbinical Court.
  - Rabbi Ben Menachem's son-in-law, Rabbi Aviezer Piltz, serves as head of Yeshivat Tushia Tifrach, and his son Rabbi Menachem Ben Menachem is a teacher in the yeshiva.
- Rabbi Elazar Menachem Man Shach, head of Ponevezh Yeshiva and leader of the Haredi-Litvak public, was married to Gutel, daughter of his sister Fruma Rivka.

== Students ==
=== At Slutsk Yeshiva ===
- Rabbi Yosef Eliyahu Henkin, posek and head of "Ezras Torah" organization in the United States
- Rabbi Moshe Feinstein, posek, head of Mesivtha Tifereth Jerusalem in New York, author of "Igrot Moshe" responsa
- Rabbi Elazar Menachem Man Shach, head of Ponevezh Yeshiva and leader of the Haredi-Lithuanian public (was married to his niece)
- Rabbi Professor Simcha Assaf, rabbi, researcher, historian, and jurist. Rector of Hebrew University of Jerusalem and Justice of the Supreme Court of Israel
- Rabbi Yechiel Michel Feinstein, head of RIETS and Yeshivat Beit Yehuda in Tel Aviv
- Rabbi Reuven Katz, rabbi of Petah Tikva, author of "Degel Reuven" responsa

=== At Etz Chaim Yeshiva ===
- Rabbi Shlomo Zalman Auerbach, posek, head of Kol Torah Yeshiva
- Rabbi Avraham Yaakov Zelaznik, head of Etz Chaim Yeshiva
- Rabbi Michel Yehuda Lefkowitz, head of Ponevezh Yeshiva for Young Students
- Rabbi Avraham Shapira, Chief Rabbi of Israel, head of Mercaz HaRav and prominent spiritual leader of Religious Zionism
- Rabbi Shlomo Goren, IDF Chief Rabbi and Chief Rabbi of Israel
- Rabbi Yitzchak Kolitz, rabbi of Jerusalem
- Rabbi Yaakov Nissan Rosenthal, head of rabbinical court in Haifa
- Rabbi Yisrael Yaakov Fisher, Chief Justice of the Edah HaChareidis
- Rabbi Chaim Yaakov Goldvicht, head of Yeshivat Kerem B'Yavneh
- Rabbi Yehuda Amital, founder and head of Yeshivat Har Etzion
- Rabbi Shmuel Auerbach, head of Maalot HaTorah Yeshiva
