= Chai Lifeline =

Chesed organization to help children battling disease

- Formation: 1987
- Type: Non-profit NGO
- Purpose: Cancer and chronic illness support
- Headquarters: New York City
- Location: 151 West 30th Street
- Region served: International
- Executive Vice President: Rabbi Simcha Scholar
- Key people: Mordechai Gobioff, Director of Client Services; Esther Schwartz, Director of Hospital Services Ari Dembitzer, Head counselor, rabbi of happiness
- Staff: 90
- Volunteers: 5,455
- Website: http://www.chailifeline.org https://www.facebook.com/chailifelinepage https://www.twitter.com/chai_lifeline

Chai Lifeline is a chesed organization founded in 1987 by Rabbi Simcha Scholar to help families with "children battling a deadly disease."

Although they have professional staff, much of their work depends on volunteers, whose ranks include those who, in their younger years, received services and survived. Their goal is to "restore the light of childhood to children whose innocence ended when life-threatening or lifelong illness was diagnosed."

While most Chai Lifeline programs operate year-round, their upstate New York summer program "for children with catastrophic illnesses" helps "Jewish children from around the world."

== History ==
Scholar's initial guidance was from Rabbi Shlomo Zalman Auerbach, and the focus was Jewish pediatric cancer patients in the New York City area. By 1990, they had offices in Florida and Jerusalem, with another planned for California.

Subsequent expansion included services to other major Jewish areas such as Baltimore and the West Coast.

Their Los Angeles office was described as "provides services to ... families of all Jewish denominations" and "depends on foundation and individual donations."

=== Mission Expansion ===
Yeshiva University hosted the first university-based Shabbaton to give exposure and training for Chai Lifeline college-age volunteers, under a Fighting Illness With Love banner. As of 2015, their first (2008) Canadian outreach still seemed limited to Montreal, like Federation CJA, with whom they affiliated. By 2018 the Toronto Star had reported the expansion of Chai Lifeline Canada to Toronto and somewhat beyond.

By 2012, small scale Chai Lifeline groups had begun in UK and Belgium, with support from the New York-based main office's professionals.

== Services ==
While not all services were available in all locations as of 2015, some of the programs offered by a blend of professionals and volunteers are:

- i-Shine: an after-school program for "support to siblings of sick children, children living with an ill parent, and those living with untimely loss in their homes"

== Camp Simcha ==
Camp Simcha is a 125-acre (0.51 km^{2}) campus located in Glen Spey, New York that offers children with cancer a chance to enjoy traditional camp activities.

Besides mini-golf, arts & crafts workshops, modified sports, color war, and talent shows there are helicopter rides and concerts. An innovative swimming pool ramp and water-submersible wheelchairs enables more children to enjoy swimming. They have a motorboat, paddle and bumper boats, and a pontoon boat capable of holding an entire bunk, including wheelchair-dependent children.

The camp program is directed by Dr. Peter Steinherz and an entire team of oncologists, pediatric oncology nurses, EMTs, social workers and physical therapists. In case of emergencies, an acute transport ambulance is on-site at all times, and accompanies campers on any trips. A Medevac helicopter is on call, and can reach the camp within five minutes.

=== Camp Simcha Special ===
Camp Simcha Special was created in 2001 to meet the medical and social needs of children and teens with disabilities, chronic diseases, or genetic diseases. Located on the same campus as Camp Simcha. The program is directed by Dr. Robert van Amerongen with a staff of pediatric specialists, nurses, EMTs, social workers and physical therapists.

== About ==
Chai Lifeline trains volunteers.

Project C.H.A.I. Crisis Intervention program ensures that children, their parents, teachers, clergy and communities can properly deal with traumatic events, often partnering with organizations such as Jewish Family & Children's Service of Arizona's Aleinu program and Misaskim. Chai Lifeline is funded by Jewish philanthropists and other fundraising receptions. They also receive government funding and grants.

== Hospital and home-based services ==
Advocacy and Case Management – a team of case managers that offer emotional support and information. Insurance Support Service – Providing general information including: explaining insurance coverage and helping to complete reimbursement applications. Meal Support – Providing meals to hospitalized patients and their families, many times also supplying food for families with a sick child when cooking is impossible. Transportation Services – Transportation to and from medical centers and doctors’ appointments. Chai House – A house located in the close proximity of The Children's Hospital of Philadelphia to accommodate family spending periods of time in the hospital.

== Counseling ==
Chailine Telephone Support Groups – Parents of children with similar prognosis discuss their situations offering support via conference calls facilitated by professional therapists.

Healing Hearts Bereavement Program – Annual weekend retreats and counseling where parents who lost a beloved child are comforted.

Chai Family Centers – Community-based counseling centers help children and parents cope with the impact of illness on their lives.

Short-term counseling – Transient advice for ill children, their parents and/or siblings is available through regional offices.

ChaiNet – A community by and for Chai Lifeline families, Chai Net allows parents to exchange information and support one another in their battles against pediatric illness. Partnering with Susan G. Komen for the Cure Chai Lifeline provides counseling for Jewish women with breast cancer.

== Educational assistance ==
ChaiLink – Webcam connections that link hospitalized or recuperating children to classrooms, teachers, and friends, and loans of laptop computers loaded with educational software.

Homebound Educational Learning Program – A tutoring program that enable hospitalized or recuperating children to keep up with their schoolwork.

== Crisis intervention and bereavement services ==
The New York Times described the organization's Brooklyn Tragedy 24 Hour Crisis Intervention Hot Line and Director of bereavement and intervention services Dr. Norman Blumenthal's made-for-parents video, created after the Murder of Leiby Kletzky in New York.

Helping when the focus was beyond children with illnesses included after:

- the India 2008 Mumbai attacks at the Chabad House
- Hurricane Sandy's devastations on the East Coast in 2012.
- The 2018 Pittsburgh shooting

Trained volunteers offer emotional and professional support.

== Trips and vacations ==
Chai Lifeline arranges trips for children who spend their days in and out of the hospital. Trips involve sporting events, shows, and special trip such as

- a trip to the Super Bowl.
- Orlando Trip – Sponsored by the Ohr Meir foundation, children spend four magical days at Florida's Disney World, Universal Studios Florida, Islands of Adventure, and SeaWorld Orlando theme parks.
- Wish at the Wall – Provides a 10-day trip to Israel for teens along with one parent each; alternating years between a group of teenage cancer survivors and teens who have learned to manage complex chronic illness. In addition, a family center at their Camp Simcha campus is available to families in need of respite when camp is not in session.

== Fundraising programs ==
Chai Lifeline is a New York City volunteer-based 501(c)(3) non-profit organization that primarily works with children battling cancer.

Fundraising programs include

- Team Lifeline,
- Team Lifeline Israel,
- Bike4Chai,
- Tour de Simcha,
- Go Mitzvah,
- Kids4Chai.

Events include

- Marathons
- Walk-a-thons
- Bowl-a-thons
- Cycling events
- and other kid friendly activities.

== Affiliates ==
Chai Lifeline International is an affiliate. One of its programs is named Chaiuanu, and it provides services in Israel.
