= Uri Bin Nun =

Israeli electrical engineer and inventor

Uri Bin Nun (Hebrew: אורי בן נון) is an Israeli inventor. He was CEO of the Israel Electric Corporation.

== Business career ==
Uri Bin Nun succeeded Jacob Razon as CEO of the Israel Electric Corporation on March 20, 2006. He resigned in 2007 following months of disagreements with the government and the company's board of directors over the planned reform of the electricity company.

Bin Nun has applied for five patents, including one for a regenerator matrix and one for a refrigeration device with an improved DC motor.
