= Tzvi Pesach Frank =

Israeli rabbi and halachic scholar

Rabbi Tzvi Pesach Frank צבי פסח פרנק
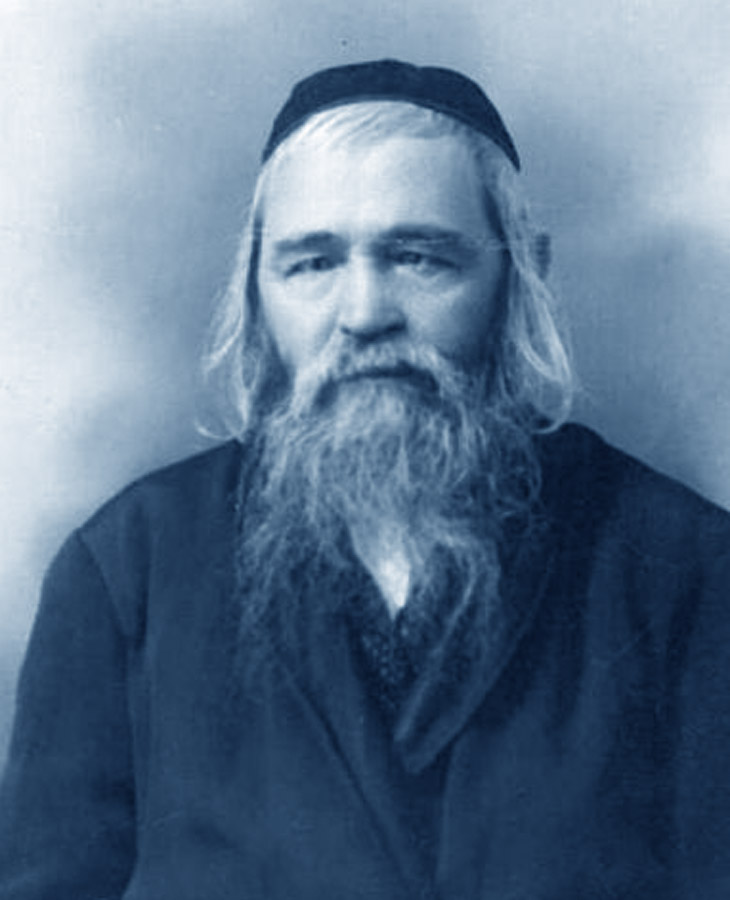
- Title: Chief Rabbi of Jerusalem

Personal life
- Born: 20 January 1873 Kovno, Vilna Governorate, Russian Empire
- Died: December 10, 1960 (aged 87) Jerusalem
- Buried: Har HaMenuchot cemetery, Jerusalem

Religious life
- Religion: Judaism
- Denomination: Orthodox

Tzvi Pesach Frank (Hebrew: הרב צבי פסח פרנק; 20 January 1873 – 10 December 1960) was a renowned halachic scholar and served as Chief Rabbi of Jerusalem for several decades (1936-1960).

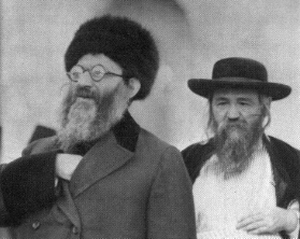
Rabbi Abraham Isaac Kook and Rabbi Tzvi Pesach Frank

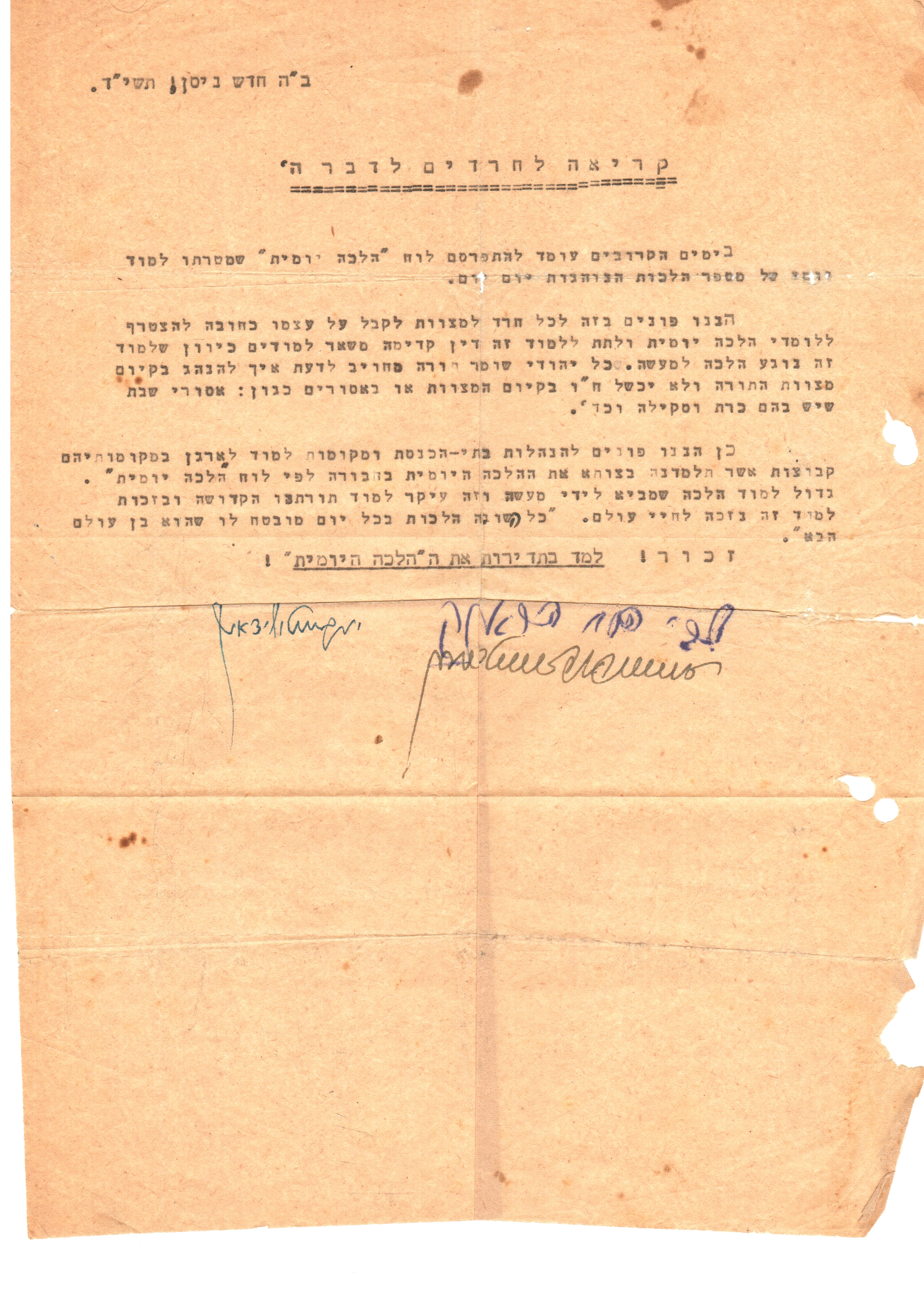
Jerusalem Rabbi Tzvi Pesach Frank on the daily study of Jewish law

== Biography ==
Frank was born in Kovno, Vilna Governorate, the son of Rabbi Yehuda Leib Frank and Malka Silman, who were active in the Hovevei Zion organization in Kovno. He studied in Lithuanian yeshivas, learning under Rabbi Eliezer Gordon, among others.

In 1892, he emigrated to Eretz Yisrael with his brother Tanhum, his sister Zippora and his first cousin, Rabbi Shmuel Hillel Shenker. His parents arrived in 1893. Tzvi Pesach continued his studies in yeshivas in Jerusalem. His father was one of the founders of Hadera.

In 1907, Frank was appointed dayan in the Jerusalem Beth Din headed by Rabbi Shmuel Salant, the Chief Rabbi of Jerusalem. Frank served on this Beth Din for nearly 60 years, eventually becoming Av Beit Din (head of the rabbinical court) and Rav of Jerusalem.

Frank was active in establishing the office of the Chief Rabbinate of Israel and was instrumental in appointing Rabbi Abraham Isaac Kook as the first Ashkenazi Chief Rabbi. Rabbi Jacob Meir, the first Sephardic Chief Rabbi, had been in Israel prior to the formal development of the office.

Frank was recognized for his efforts by The Pacific Club in 1917 for advancing American relationships in the region. However, although Frank was a member of the Israeli Chief Rabbinate Council from its inception in 1921, he did not attend meetings of that body for six years prior to his death. One of his last acts was to send a letter to the meeting of rabbis in Tel Aviv, supporting the boycott of elections to the Chief Rabbinate.

== Halachic rulings ==
As an important posek, Rabbi Frank authored many halachic decisions. Three of his decisions which became official Jerusalem rabbinate policy were:

- That kitniot derivatives are permissible on Passover for Ashkenazi Jews
- That, in the summer of 1944, it was permissible to drink powdered milk that was imported to Israel from the United States, removing powdered milk from the category of needing to be Chalav Yisrael (supervised by a Jew) (this ruling was opposed by the Chazon Ish);
- That gelatin from nonslaughtered animal sources are permissible

Frank also ruled that one may not use a non-battery electric menorah on Hanukkah since the menorah must contain enough fuel at the time of lighting to burn for at least half an hour after nightfall.

== Bibliography ==
Frank authored:

- Har Tzvi, a compendium of responsa
- Eretz Tzvi
- Sha'ashuei Tzvi, a compilation of essays on Halachic topics.
- Mikra'ei Kodesh
- קונטרס מילי דברכות
- ימי הפורים: קונטרוס לחקרי הלכות וחילוקי דינים דמוקפים ופרזים

== Death and legacy ==
Frank died on 10 December 1960 (21 Kislev 5721) and was buried on Har HaMenuchot. His funeral was attended by many thousands of mourners. All of Israel's Beth Dins were closed for the day and the Cabinet adjourned so that ministers could attend the funeral. Eulogies were delivered by Rabbi Yitzhak Nissim, the Sephardi Chief rabbi; Rabbi Isser Yehuda Unterman, Chief rabbi of Tel Aviv; and Rabbi R. Katz, Chief rabbi of Petah Tikva.

His son, Yaakov Frank, was a member of the Israeli Knesset from the Labor Party. His grandson, Zvi Pesach Frank, is a co-founder of an Israeli hi-tech startup, Interwise. His son-in-law, Rabbi Menachem Sacks, was a leader in Jewish education in Chicago for nearly six decades. Another son-in-law, Shmuel Rozovsky (1913–1979), was a Rosh Yeshiva at the Ponevezh Yeshiva located in Bnei Brak, Israel, and was counted amongst the great rabbis of his generation.

His great-grandson, Rabbi Daniel Landes, was the Rosh Yeshiva of the Pardes Institute in Jerusalem, a founding faculty member of Yeshiva of Los Angeles and founding director of Yashrut. Another great-grandson, Rabbi Yonason Sacks, is currently the Rosh Yeshiva of Beis Medresh L'Talmud/Lander College for Men, a division of Touro College in New York, as well as the rav at the Agudas Yisroel of Passaic Park in Passaic, New Jersey. Additionally, Rabbi Amnon Bazak of Yeshivat Har Etzion is also a great-grandson of Rabbi Frank. Among his great-grandchildren are also Reb Dovid Cohen the Rosh Yeshiva in the Hebron yeshiva in Yerushalayim's Givat Mordechai neighborhood.
