= Lander College for Men =

Private men's division of Touro University System

- בית מדרש לתלמוד
- Type: Private
- Established: 2000; 26 years ago
- Parent institution: Touro University System
- Affiliations: Orthodox Judaism
- Dean: Henry Abramson
- Rosh Yeshiva: Yonason Sacks
- Location: Kew Gardens Hills, Queens, New York City, U.S. 40.724°N 73.815°W
- Campus: Urban
- Website: lcm.touro.edu
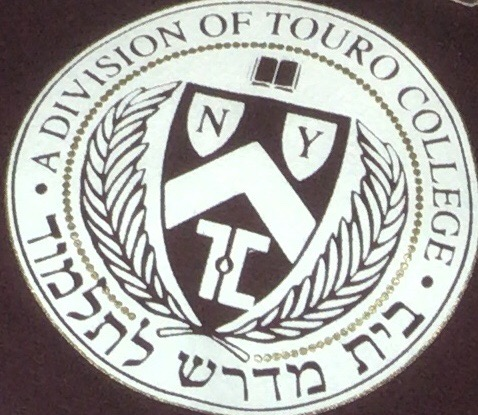

The Lander College for Men is a private men's division of Touro University System located in Kew Gardens Hills, Queens, New York City. Its stated goal is to provide a college curriculum while maintaining a traditional Yeshiva environment. Generally, its attendees are students who have attended post-high school programs studying Talmud prior to their attendance, primarily in Israel.

== Background and history ==
The Lander College for Men opened in the fall of 2000, and before long moved onto its 7-acre (28,000 m^{2}) campus in Kew Gardens Hills. It graduated its first class in 2003. Geoffrey Alderman, who was a Vice President of Touro College, was Dean of the Lander College for Men from its inception, and served until the end of February 2002. He left to work at American InterContinental University in the UK. The current dean of the Lander College for Men, Dr. Moshe Sokol, succeeded him at that time. Dr. Sokol left Lander College for Men at the end of June 2024 to become director of Touro's Graduate School of Jewish Studies, and Dr. Henry Abramson, formerly Dean of Lander College of Arts and Sciences, succeeded him.

In May 2012, Rabbi Abba Bronspigel retired from the position of Rosh HaYeshiva of Beis Medrash L'Talmud. He was succeeded by Rabbi Yonason Sacks in the Fall of 2012.

In the biography of Rabbi Dr. Bernard Lander, it is stated that the Lander College for Men was created partially in response to dissatisfaction with the liberalization of Yeshiva University during the tenure of Rabbi Dr. Norman Lamm. In response to this, some of Yeshiva University's rabbinical faculty, specifically Rabbis Abba Bronspigel and Yehuda Parnes, decided to leave the school. With the assistance of Lander, they created a school with the goal of providing a more religious and more challenging Yeshiva environment than that of Yeshiva University.

Bernard Lander called the Lander College for Men the "flagship" of Touro College.

== Academic environment ==
This is a dual curriculum program involving college courses along with Judaic studies. The vast majority of students in the school transfer from Israeli institutions focusing on post-high school full-time Judaic studies, where most have studied for multiple years. The school has a Yeshiva program, in conjunction with the associated Beis Medrash L'Talmud, for full-time Judaic studies for students who are either pre- or post-college. In accordance with school policy, all students are required to pray with the school's prayer services thrice daily. All students must also attend the morning program of Talmud studies, usually from 9:00am until 2:15pm, each Sunday through Thursday, with a break for lunch (the schedule varies by day). Following afternoon prayers at 2:20pm, academic classes start, Monday through Thursday, lasting until 7:00pm or so for most students. Night Seder (evening Judaic studies) from 8pm until 10pm is also officially mandatory, unless exempted by specific classes such as labs.

== Notable alumni ==
- Daniel Rosenthal (born 1991), politician who represented the 27th District in the New York State Assembly from 2017 to 2023, and was the Assembly's youngest member when he took office.
- Hananel Gez, husband of Tze'ela Gez, murdered in a terrorist attack in Israel while driving to hospital to deliver her baby. (The baby lived two weeks and then succumbed to injuries.)

== Notable faculty ==
- Yonason Sacks, Rosh Yeshiva
- Henry Abramson, Dean
- Aryeh Lebowitz, Magid Shiur 2016-19
- Israel Singer, Professor of Political Science

== See also ==
- List of Jewish universities and colleges in the United States
- Bar-Ilan University
- Hebrew Theological College
- Jerusalem College of Technology
- Yeshiva University
- Hareidi Judaism
- Yehuda (Leo) Levi
