= Yitzchak Berkovits =

American rabbi

Rabbi Yitzchak Berkovits יצחק ברקוביץ
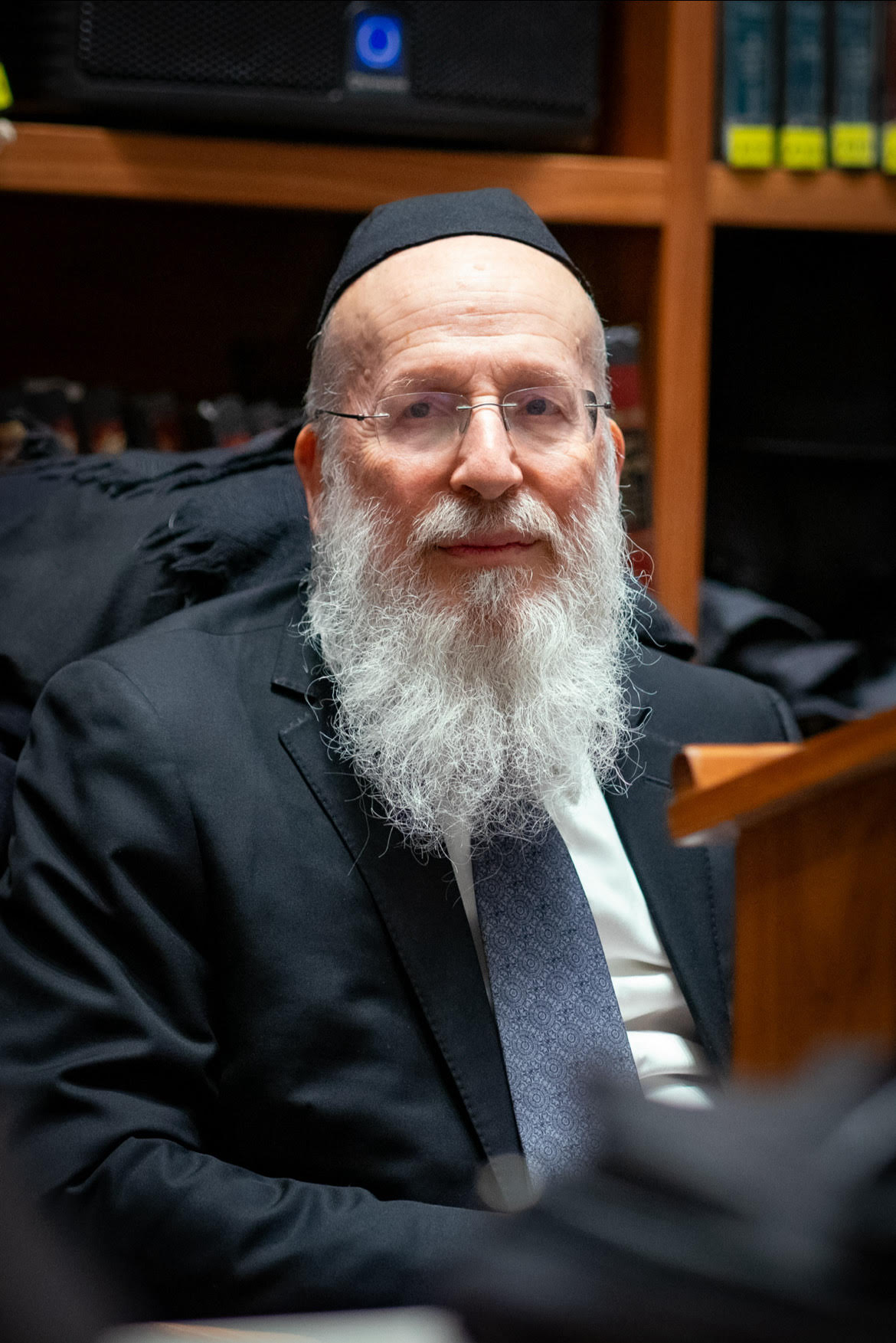
- Rabbi Berkovits visiting Ohr Somayach, 2023

Personal life
- Born: Yitzchak Shmuel Halevi Berkovits Brooklyn, New York, US
- Parent(s): Aryeh Leib Halevi and Chana Berkovits
- Education: Mir yeshiva (Jerusalem)

Religious life
- Religion: Judaism

Jewish leader
- Predecessor: Rabbi Noah Weinberg
- Yeshiva: Aish HaTorah
- Position: Rosh yeshiva
- Began: 2019
- Other: Rosh kollel, The Jerusalem Kollel
- Residence: Jerusalem, Israel

Yitzchak Shmuel Halevi Berkovits (Hebrew: יצחק שמואל הלוי ברקוביץ) is an American-born Orthodox Jewish rabbi, rosh yeshiva, rosh kollel, and posek (arbiter of Jewish law) in Israel. In 16 years as Menahel Ruchani (spiritual director) of Yeshivas Aish HaTorah and halakha (Jewish law) lecturer at EYAHT, Aish HaTorah's College of Jewish Studies for Women, he built a reputation as a lucid orator on Jewish law and philosophical topics and a mentor to hundreds of English-speaking, baalei teshuva young men and women. In 2001, he founded The Jerusalem Kollel, a rabbinic ordination and training program which prepares students for kiruv (outreach) positions around the world. In 2019, he was appointed rosh yeshiva of Yeshivat Aish HaTorah in Jerusalem. He also serves as rosh kollel of an international network of evening kollelim run by Linas HaTzedek: The Center for Jewish Values in Israel and the United States, which spreads the awareness of the laws of bein adam lechaveiro (mitzvot between man and his fellow man).

Rabbi Berkovits is considered the "unofficial posek" of the kiruv world. He is well known to international audiences for his telephone tapes and books on shemiras halashon (laws of proper speech) for the Chofetz Chaim Heritage Foundation.

== Early life and education ==
Yitzchak Shmuel Halevi Berkovits is the only son of Aryeh Leib Halevi and Chana Berkowitz, both Holocaust survivors. His ancestors on both his father's and mother's sides were Hasidic, including his paternal great-grandfather, Pinchos Zimetbaum, the av beth din of Grosswardein, and his great-uncle, dayan Yitzchok Yaakov Weiss.

Raised in Borough Park, Brooklyn which had a lack of Hasidic yeshivas at the time, Berkovits was enrolled at the non-Hasidic yeshiva Yeshiva Toras Emes Kaminetz. At the age of 20 he went to Israel to study at the Mir Yeshiva in Jerusalem, where he learned under Nochum Partzovitz. He spent much time in the home of his illustrious great-uncle and also made relationships with Jerusalem poskim Yosef Shalom Elyashiv and Yisroel Yaakov Fisher. He married at age 28.

== Career ==
After ten years at the Mir, in 1983, Berkovits was asked by the rebbetzin Denah Weinberg to teach Jewish law in her new seminary, EYAHT, the Aish HaTorah College of Jewish Studies for Women. Weinberg's husband, Noah Weinberg, then appointed him menahel ruchani or spiritual director of Yeshivas Aish HaTorah in the Old City of Jerusalem. During his 16 years with Aish HaTorah, Berkovits developed and supervised the yeshiva's rabbinic ordination program, graduating hundreds of students.

In 2001, Berkovits left Aish HaTorah to found The Jerusalem Kollel, a three-year rabbinic ordination and training program which prepares rabbis and kiruv (outreach) counsellors to serve communities in the Jewish diaspora. Berkovits is the rosh kollel. Hundreds of his students fill prominent positions around the globe. In the evenings, the kollel turns into a beth midrash (study hall) for advanced avreichim from the Mir and Brisk yeshivas who regard Berkovits as a halakhic authority.

In 2017, Berkovits acquiesced to requests by Aish HaTorah directors to return to the yeshiva and serve as its halakhic authority (Jewish Babylonian Aramaic: מרא דאתרא, romanized: marā dʾaṯrā, lit. 'director of the region'). In August 2019, he was named rosh yeshiva, a position that had been vacant since the 2009 death of founding dean, Noah Weinberg. In 2019, the yeshiva had a student body of more than 600, plus drop-in visitors totaling close to 200,000 annually. Berkovits delivers a daily shiur to all levels and is involved in restructuring the yeshiva's curriculum. He will continue his other responsibilities in addition to his duties at Aish HaTorah.

== Other affiliations ==
In 2001, Berkovits began serving as rosh kollel of the Linas Hatzedek Kollel, an advanced kollel dedicated to the study of the laws of bein adam lechaveiro (mitzvot between man and his fellow man). The students, all full-time avreichim, completed the two-year program and went out to form their own night kollelim on the subject. The kollel, founded and led by Rabbis Paysach Freedman and Tzvi Muller, continued expanding and developed into the Linas HaTzedek: The Center for Jewish Values, which disseminates various study materials on the topic for kollels, schools, synagogues, outreach organizations and individuals across the world. Berkovits serves as nasi and rosh hakollelim of Linas HaTzedek's international network of kollelim and its other study programs. Additionally, the organization has published nine volumes of Berkovits's writings on the laws of bein adam lechaveiro.

In 2009 Berkovits became the Nasi (president) of UK-based charity Torah Live. He is also the Nasi of the international organisation Jewish Futures, a platform created to unite diverse educational organisations and initiatives, to ensure Jewish futures and Jewish continuity.

== Halakhic expertise ==
Berkovits is a leading authority on the laws of bein adam le'chavero, the Torah's guidelines for interpersonal relationships. He is well known for his expertise in the laws of lashon hara and is the co-author of Chofetz Chaim: A Lesson a Day (2 vol.). He has recorded thousands of taped lectures on a vast range of halakhic and Talmudic topics. He regularly answers she'eilos (halakhic queries) from around the world, addressing issues "from kashrus to geirus to halachic questions arising from alternative lifestyle issues".

Berkovits is the mara d'asra (halakhic authority) of Jerusalem's Sanhedria Murhevet neighborhood, where he resides.

== Rent control committee ==
In 2007, Berkovits founded a rent control committee in the Sanhedria Murhevet neighborhood of Jerusalem in response to price gouging on the part of landlords renting to non-resident Haredi families. Other neighborhoods followed his lead, and this policy was adopted by Rabbi Aharon Leib Shteinman of Bnei Brak and the Belzer Rebbe. This effort has served to maintain reasonable rental prices for foreigners living in Jerusalem.

== Bibliography ==
- Finkelman, Rabbi Shimon; Berkowitz, Rabbi Yitzchak (1995). Chofetz Chaim, a Lesson a Day: The Concepts and Laws of Proper Speech Arranged for Daily Study. Mesorah Publications, Ltd. ISBN 0-89906-321-7.
- Svirsky, Meira; Berkowitz, Yitzchak; Kaganoff, Yirmiyohu (2007). A woman's mitzvah: A fully sourced guide to the laws of family purity. Mesorah Publications Ltd. ISBN 978-9657227244.
- Berkowitz, Yitzchak; et al. (2009). The Six Constant Mitzvos. Mesorah Publications, Ltd. ISBN 978-1422609262.
