= Torah Live =

Jewish educational technology organization

- Founded: September 2007
- Founder: Rabbi Dan Roth
- Type: Nonprofit Jewish educational technology organization
- Tax ID no.: 501(c)(3) (USA); Charity No. 1134560 (UK)
- Purpose: Online streaming platform producing animated videos, games, quizzes, and digital learning tools for Jewish education
- Headquarters: Jerusalem, Israel
- Region served: Worldwide
- Method: Animated video, gamified e-learning, interactive media
- Key people: Rabbi Dan Roth (Founder & Director); Meir Roth (Director of Platform Development); Teli Kaufman (Marketing Director); Rabbi Yitzchak Berkovits (President)
- Budget: Over $10 million invested in production (2023)
- Employees: 7 full-time, 52 freelancers (2023)
- Website: torahlive.com

Torah Live is a nonprofit Jewish educational technology organization based in Jerusalem, Israel, that operates an online streaming platform for Jewish education. The platform features over one thousand animated and live-action videos, interactive games, quizzes, comics, and creative challenges covering Jewish law (halacha), Jewish philosophy (hashkafa), character development (middos), prayer, and Jewish holidays. Founded in 2007 by Rabbi Dan Roth under the guidance of Rabbi Yitzchak Berkovits, Torah Live content is designed for children, teenagers, and adults, and is used both at home by families and in classroom settings by Jewish day schools and outreach organizations worldwide. Materials have been used by organizations including Aish HaTorah, NCSY, and Chabad.

Torah Live is registered as a 501(c)(3) nonprofit in the United States, a registered charity in the United Kingdom (No. 1134560). As of 2023, the platform reported 1.8 million video views, 130,000 active users, and over $10 million invested in production, with 91% of funding from philanthropy and the remainder from subscriptions. The organization has received rabbinical endorsements from over 30 authorities, including the late British Chief Rabbi Lord Jonathan Sacks, Rabbi Asher Weiss, Rabbi Shmuel Kamenetsky, Rabbi Hershel Schachter, Rabbi Yisrael Reisman, and the late Rabbi Abraham Twerski.

== History ==
=== Founding and early years (2007–2012) ===
Rabbi Dan Roth, a London-raised graduate of Kerem B'Yavneh and the Mir Yeshiva in Jerusalem, founded Torah Live after an experience teaching Pirkei Avos (Ethics of the Fathers) at Yeshiva Ohr Somayach's Yesod program, a division for students who had become disengaged from religious life. In a 2023 interview with the Baltimore Jewish Home, Roth described the founding moment as "the worst day of my life," recounting how his students walked out of a traditional lecture on tithes. When he returned the following day with the same material presented in a multimedia format, the same students were "glued to their seats." Roth, who had no prior background in animation or video production, taught himself Cinema 4D, SketchUp, and Adobe Premiere Pro to begin creating multimedia Torah presentations. His wife Becky assisted by photographing him against a homemade felt green screen for the earliest visual effects shots.

He subsequently recruited a team of graphic designers and programmers and began producing multimedia presentations on topics including blessings, sukkah, yichud, tzedakah, and mezuzah. All content was produced under the halachic oversight of Rabbi Yitzchak Berkovits, dean of The Jerusalem Center for Jewish Values and Rosh Kollel of the Jerusalem Kollel.

During this period, Torah Live operated primarily as a live-presentation and DVD distribution company, licensing materials to schools and kiruv organizations in the United States, United Kingdom, South Africa, and Israel. The organization presented at venues including Her Majesty's Treasury in Westminster, the Mir Yeshiva in Jerusalem, Torah U'Mesorah conventions, and Dayan Ehrentreu's Conversion Conference in Munich. By 2011, Torah Live had delivered over 150 presentations in 50 cities worldwide.

In August 2011, Mishpacha Magazine published a feature article by Jonathan Rosenblum about Torah Live and included a sample DVD with all 32,500 copies of the magazine distributed worldwide. Torah Live was also covered by Hamodia and the Jewish Press during this period.

=== Transition to online platform ===
Torah Live transitioned from physical DVD distribution and live presentations to an online streaming platform. Director of Platform Development Meir Roth led the technical transformation of the platform into a gamified digital learning environment.

The organization's videos also became available on El Al Israel Airlines' in-flight entertainment system. According to Roth, the El Al library grew from an initial 3 hours of content to 11 hours, with 7,500 views reported every few months as of 2023. In a 2021 feature in the Jewish Journal, journalist Toby Klein Greenwald confirmed the El Al presence, noting that "some of their films have even appeared on El Al."

=== COVID-19 response and growth (2020–present) ===
In March 2020, as Jewish day schools across North America closed due to the COVID-19 pandemic, Torah Live offered free premium accounts to all Jewish day schools and their students. Schools received unique landing pages, access codes, and technical support for distributing the platform to students. The Jerusalem Post published a front-page magazine feature on Rabbi Roth and Torah Live that same month. Prizmah: Center for Jewish Day Schools, a network serving over 300 Jewish day schools in North America, listed Torah Live among its recommended online Jewish studies learning options during the pandemic.

The Australian Jewish News reported that during the COVID-19 lockdowns, Torah Live's website had been accessed by 200,000 active users.

Following the pandemic period, Torah Live rebuilt its platform as a fully gamified learning environment. By 2021, over 30 scriptwriters, animators, video editors, and sound and special effects artists were involved in content production.

In 2023, Torah Live launched "Torah Quest," a community-wide Torah scavenger hunt premiering in Baltimore, where a local donor, Dr. Paul Volosov, had previously sponsored Torah Live access for every school in the city, making Baltimore what Roth described as the first "Torah Live city." The organization announced plans to bring Torah Quest to Toronto, Miami, Los Angeles, and New York City.

== Platform and content ==
=== Video library ===
Torah Live's content library consists of over one thousand animated and live-action videos organized into courses spanning Jewish law (including Shabbos, kashrus, blessings, tefillin, tzitzis, and mezuzah), Jewish philosophy (including emunah, tefillah, and free will), character development (including patience, gratitude, anger management, and friendship), and Jewish holidays (including Sukkos, Chanukah, Purim, Pesach, and Shavuos).

The platform is accessible via web browser and through dedicated mobile applications for iOS and Android with offline viewing capability, as well as Roku streaming devices.

=== Production ===
Each Torah Live video is produced by a team that includes scriptwriters, 3D graphic artists, video editors, sound engineers, and a research team of Torah educators who study the relevant Talmudic and halachic source material before scripting begins to ensure accuracy. Key production staff includes scriptwriter and showrunner Elchanan Schnurr, a former Hollywood professional, and lead animator Ronen Zhurat.

The production process combines 3D computer graphics, professional actors, animation, and live-action footage filmed on location in Israel. Roth has described the production standard for a typical seven-minute video as requiring two scriptwriters, four video designers, ten dedicated Torah educators, three rabbis, and two sound engineers.

=== Gamification and Real World Impact ===
The platform incorporates a gamification system in which users earn points, advance through 36 levels (an allusion to the 36 righteous individuals described in the Talmud), collect badges for creativity, responsibility, and participation, and earn virtual currency called "dinarim." Through what the organization calls "Real World Impact" (RWI), users can redeem dinarim for charitable acts carried out through partnerships with 17 nonprofit organizations. Examples include sending food packages to families in need, delivering entertainment packages to sick children, and sending flowers to elderly residents in retirement homes. The gaming system was developed with the advisory involvement of Rabbi Yaakov Deyo, and a Harvard University graduate, who has been involved in Jewish educational organizations including the Jewish Enrichment Center of Manhattan and Partners in Torah in New Jersey.

=== Educator tools ===
Torah Live provides resources for classroom use, including student workbooks (in middle school and high school editions), teacher guides, source sheets, presentation materials, and interactive Kahoot! quizzes. A curriculum guide maps video content to the weekly Torah portion, Navi, Mishnah, and Gemara. A parent and teacher dashboard allows educators to track student progress, control which courses students can access, and share content with parents.

The platform has also been used at settings supporting students with learning differences, including Camp Kaylie, where the visual and interactive format was noted as effective across different learning styles.

=== Accessibility and user base ===
Torah Live's content is designed for use by children, teenagers, and adults across a range of Jewish backgrounds and observance levels. The same article noted an unexpected user base among the Bnei Menashe community in India, a group claiming descent from the Lost Tribes of Israel whose Jewish status was confirmed in 2005 by Sephardi Chief Rabbi Shlomo Amar.

Schools cited in published sources as using Torah Live include Torah Academy of Boston, Maimonides School, Gindi Maimonides School in Los Angeles, and schools in Greater Boston and Baltimore.

The platform offers a free tier with limited content and paid subscription plans that unlock the full library. Rabbi Yitzchak Berkovits issued a halachic ruling permitting the use of ma'aser (tithe) funds to purchase subscriptions, on the grounds that subscription revenue directly funds the production of new educational content.

== Leadership and organization ==
Rabbi Dan Roth serves as founder and director. Rabbi Yitzchak Berkovits serves as president and provides halachic oversight for all content. Meir Roth serves as Director of Platform Development, overseeing the technical development and digital infrastructure of the streaming platform. Teli Kaufman serves as Marketing Director, responsible for subscriber growth, partnerships, and revenue strategy.

Dan Roth was born in London and moved to Israel in 2000. He studied at Kerem B'Yavneh and the Mir Yeshiva in Jerusalem and received semicha (rabbinical ordination) from the Chief Rabbinate of Israel. Before founding Torah Live, he taught at Yeshiva Ohr Somayach. He is also the author of Relevance: Pirkei Avos for the Twenty-First Century, published by Feldheim Publishers in 2008, which explores the contemporary application of Pirkei Avos (Ethics of the Fathers).

As of 2023, Torah Live employed 7 full-time staff and 52 freelancers worldwide, including scriptwriters, editors, producers, sound mixers, and special effects artists. Approximately 91% of the organization's funding came from philanthropy, with the remainder from subscriptions.

== Publications ==
- Relevance: Pirkei Avos for the Twenty-First Century by Rabbi Dan Roth (Feldheim Publishers, 2008)

== See also ==
- Jewish education
- Torah study
- Kiruv
- Educational technology
- Gamification of learning
- Yitzchak Berkovits
- Jonathan Sacks
