= Association for Jewish Outreach Programs =

Organization

The Association for Jewish Outreach Programs (formerly the Association for Jewish Outreach Professionals), also known by its abbreviation AJOP, was an Orthodox Jewish network which was established to unite and enhance the Jewish educational work of rabbis, rebbetzens, lay people, and volunteers who work in a variety of settings and seek to improve and promote Jewish Orthodox outreach work with ba'alei teshuvah guiding Jews to live according to Orthodox Jewish values. AJOP was the first major Jewish Orthodox organization of its kind that was not affiliated with the Chabad Hasidic movement. It closed in 2017.

Rabbis, rebbetzens, and activists in the field of "Jewish outreach" working in the various areas of Orthodox Jewish education are often referred to as "kiruv professionals" or "kiruv workers" as well as "kiruv volunteers" in the Orthodox community.

== AJOP as a response to the kiruv movement ==
The growth of the Baal teshuva movement ("returnees" [to Orthodox Judaism]) that gained strides in the 1960s, went hand in hand with, and was often the result of, "kiruv" efforts ("kiruv" means "bringing close [to Judaism]") by rabbis and Orthodox Jews all over the world.

The worldwide efforts of the Chabad Hasidic movement were guided by Rabbi Menachem Mendel Schneerson the leader of Chabad who encouraged many of his followers to leave the confines of Brooklyn and to set up synagogues and communities in non-Orthodox settings and to "mekarev" ("bring closer" [secular Jews to Judaism]) and to the Chabad-Lubavitch brand of Hasidism in particular. These Shluchim or Shlichim did the work of "outreach" that was meant to attract Baal teshuvas to Judaism.

== AVI CHAI Foundation founds AJOP ==
With the passage of time there came the recognition that not only Chabad was doing this work but that many other rabbis and volunteers from all branches of the Orthodox, Haredi, and Hasidic world were involved in the same kind of "outreach" kiruv work. During the mid-1980s Sanford C. Bernstein the founder and director of the investment house Sanford C. Bernstein and Company had become a devoted follower of Rabbi Shlomo Riskin and decided to establish the AVI CHAI Foundation to research and help all manner of Jewish education and particularly Jewish outreach ("kiruv") if it met the criteria of his foundation (no opposition to Zionism and to accept the value of secular knowledge.)

The AVI CHAI Foundation granted several million dollars each to both AJOP and to what was meant to be a "sister" effort the National Jewish Outreach Program (NJOP) and their similar sounding names were chosen deliberately and were meant to reinforce each other's work. While AJOP was geared to the "Outreach Professional" doing the "outreach" at the same time NJOP was directed at the non-Orthodox Jewish public who were to be offered a variety of introduction to Judaism programs. The first president of both organizations was Rabbi Ephraim Buchwald a foremost Modern Orthodox outreach rabbi who is also the head of outreach efforts at Lincoln Square Synagogue in Manhattan.

== AJOP founded in New York ==
During its first decade AJOP was known as the Association for Jewish Outreach Professionals. Upon its founding in 1987, AJOP was based in Manhattan, New York City. The first director was Gerald Weisberg who was not a rabbi but an administrator in the public school system of New York. It was he who was given the initial mandate to build the organization. His first and most successful innovation was the annual AJOP convention, held in January, that has always attracted hundreds of Orthodox rabbis and their wives, some serving as pulpit rabbis and others as teachers and principals of Jewish day schools. A governing board of rabbis was chosen and the most prominent was Rabbi Yaakov Weinberg the rosh yeshiva of Yeshivas Ner Yisroel who served as AJOP chief rabbinical advisor until the time of his death in 1999.

AJOP's second president was Rabbi Shaya Milikowsky who was affiliated with the Yeshivas Ner Yisroel MAOR Institute training young rabbis to become "outreach professionals" as Rabbi Buchwald became AJOP's honorary president. Rabbi Ephraim Buchwald has served as AJOP's Honorary President during the entire lifespan of the organization. AJOP's second director was Rabbi Herschel Leiner. Rabbi Leiner was endorsed personally and publicly by Rabbi Avraham Yaakov Pam the rosh yeshiva of Yeshiva Torah Vodaas at one of AJOP's annual conventions. The appointment of Rabbi Milikowsky as President and Rabbi Leiner as Director was an indication that AJOP was officially moving in a more Haredi direction.

Rabbi Leiner's tenure was brief as he went on to a leadership role in the Haredi yeshiva Sh'or Yoshuv that traditionally had a Baal teshuva student base. As the AVI CHAI Foundation announced that it would wind down funding for AJOP the decision was made to align with the National Council of Young Israel (NCYI) and a third director, Rabbi Shmuel Stauber was appointed. The alliance with the NCYI was brief but was soon followed by the organization's move of its main office outside of New York State by the end of the 1990s.

== AJOP based in Baltimore ==
With the termination of funding from the AVI CHAI Foundation that had lasted close to a decade, the rabbinic leadership of AJOP decided to move its main headquarters to Baltimore, Maryland under its third president Rabbi Shlomo Porter. At this point AJOP was renamed the Association for Jewish Outreach Programs. Its two chief rabbinical authorities became Rabbi Shmuel Kamenetsky (the rosh yeshiva of the Talmudical Yeshiva of Philadelphia) and Rabbi Yaakov Perlow (the Rebbe of Novominsk.) The fourth and present director is Rabbi Yitzchok Lowenbraun.

Having moved to Baltimore, active and wealthy lay members were added to the Board of Directors such as Richard Horowitz as Vice President among others.

== Functions of AJOP ==
AJOP assisted outreach professionals in their work through an array of organizational and productivity based initiatives and products, such as resource materials and books where Kiruv professionals worldwide united to network, share resources, learn from experienced professionals in the field, and discuss issues. AJOP also distributed a weekly e-newsletter, containing reputable sources and publishers who shared information such as Torah discourses, Halacha, inspirational stories, and recipes, and ran an online store which sold merchandise tailored for those in the field of Orthodox Jewish outreach.

== AJOPNET established in 1989 ==
AJOP was an early pioneer in explaining the uses of computer networks as an outreach tool at its earliest conventions. At all its early annual conventions, beginning in 1989, Gerald Weisberg AJOP's founding executive director, promoted workshops that introduced participants to the concept of a Bulletin Board System via "AJOPNET". A Task Force on New Technology was headed by an AJOP founding trustee Rabbi Yaacov Haber who had discovered the efficacy of BitNet newsgroups in spreading the teaching of a weekly Torah portion. Rabbi Haber as chairman of the task force spoke highly of his ability to reach people from his outpost as a community rabbi in far-off Buffalo, New York. In an AJOP newsletter, dated May–June 1989 the new technology is described as follows:

Task Force on New Technology TFNT)
AJOPNET Your Personal Outreach Resource Center

...Would you like to share a program that you have developed that is very effective with the rest of the kiruv community...Communicate with one person or the entire outreach community? AJOPNET can provide all of the above and more at almost no cost... AJOPNET uses a technology called "electronic mail," which allows each user to send messages back and forth to AJOP and each other through and international computer network... Contact us today if you would like to participate... The only equipment that is required is a personal computer of any kind equipped with a modem...

...Get "on line" for AJOPNET. (Installation of the modem, software, and on-site training is available through AJOP...)

Although originally constituted as a Bulletin Board System, Rabbi Yaakov Menken of Project Genesis prevailed upon AJOP to relaunch AJOPNET as an Electronic mailing list under his direction. Rabbi Menken presented his pioneering work at AJOP's early annual conventions, as was recognized by Rabbi Yitzchok Adlerstein another of AJOP's founding trustees. The project was ahead of times, and it would be another decade before use of the Internet for Jewish outreach would become widespread through sites such as Chabad.org, Torah.org and Aish.com.

== Connection with Haredi Judaism ==
While AJOP's founders, such as Sanford Bernstein, Rabbi Ephraim Buchwald and Gerald Weisberg were firmly rooted in the Modern Orthodox world, AJOP's membership has been heavily drawn from the mostly Haredi world. The Haredi dominance of AJOP is exemplified by its acceptance of Rabbis Yaakov Perlow and Shmuel Kaminetzky as its chief rabbinical sponsors. So much so, that one of Agudath Israel of America chief spokesman, Rabbi Avi Shafran has spoken out on its behalf:

On January 16, the Association for Jewish Outreach Programs (AJOP), with which hundreds (yes, hundreds) of Orthodox outreach organizations are affiliated, will begin its annual 5-day convention; it will be the group's sixteenth such annual gathering. Among AJOP's members are a large number of community kollelim -- or Torah-study centers -- that offer study-partners, lectures and discussion groups to the Jewishly educated and non-educated alike. Such kollelim thrive in places like Phoenix, Des Moines, Norfolk, Boca Raton, and Palo Alto, not to mention larger cities like Atlanta, Dallas, Seattle, Memphis, Chicago, Miami, Philadelphia and Cleveland (and many more -- including locations in South America, Canada and Mexico) "I Have a Dream," Jewish Law Commentary, Am Echad resources.

Shafran was responding to a critique published by the Jerusalem Center for Public Affairs by Chaim Waxman called "Changing Jewish Communities: Winners and Losers in Denominational Memberships in the United States":

With these developments, the haredim (ultra-Orthodox) have apparently gained self-confidence that manifests itself in greater assertiveness. For example, whereas at mid-century religious outreach was the province of the modern Orthodox, with the haredim being somewhat suspicious of ba'alei teshuva (the newly religious), by the end of the century the haredim were heavily engaged in religious outreach. Some of the frameworks include the National Jewish Outreach Program (NJOP), the Association for Jewish Outreach Programs (AJOP), with which hundreds of Orthodox outreach organizations are affiliated, and the Orthodox Union's National Conference of Synagogue Youth (NCSY). Many of these were initially modern Orthodox but are today staffed by haredim.

== See also ==
- Orthodox Jewish outreach
