= Palatnik =

Palatnik (Russian: Палатник, Ukrainian: Палатнік) is a Bulgarian surname, derived from the word palatka, "tent". It may refer to:

- Abraham Palatnik (1902–?), doctor specialized in radiology, born in Lipkani, Russia
- Abraham Palatnik (1928–2020), Brazilian artist and inventor
- Leo Palatnik (Ukrainian: Лев Самойлович Палатнік, 1909–1994), Ukrainian physicist
- Lori Palatnik (born 1960), Orthodox Jewish educator, author and video blogger
- Sam Palatnik (born 1950), Ukrainian-US Jewish chess Grandmaster
