= Mushroom synagogue =

Term describing 'pop-up' Jewish synagogues during High Holidays

A mushroom synagogue is a synagogue that sprang up temporarily, usually on a for-profit basis, usually only for the High Holidays. These synagogues became popular during the 1920s and 1930s, especially during the Great Depression when purchasing a seat for services was more difficult to afford.

== Background ==
At the turn of the 20th century, the Lower East Side of New York City had over 300 synagogues for the growing Jewish community. However, due to economic demands, many Jews became lax in observance of the Sabbath and would not attend services on a regular basis. Only a quarter of men attended services regularly. Even if a person didn't attend synagogue the whole year, many Jews would still attend during the High Holiday season, sometimes referred to as "twice-a-year Jews". To accommodate the large demand that the local synagogues could not satisfy, these new synagogues would sprout up.

The religious establishment fought these synagogues on an annual basis. The August 17, 1930 edition of the Jewish Daily Bulletin announced that New York rabbis had issued a "war declaration" against the synagogues. The religious leaders continued issuing proclamations, publishing advertising notices in papers, and even going so far as to push to have legislation passed in New York State in 1934 that forbade religious services "that fraudulently represents itself as being in 'accordance with the precepts of any recognized religious creed' or misrepresents the facilities that the services will be held in or the qualifications of the person leading the services".

== Reactions ==
While the Jewish establishment fought against the mushroom synagogues, oftentimes providing free tickets and setting up synagogues without a need for tickets, the fight seemed to cease during the 1920s. During the decade, many synagogues were built, especially with more room for attending worship services and providing other social services. The added prosperity of the community allowed traditional and mushroom synagogues to operate. The Great Depression changed all this. With holiday tickets being a major avenue of revenue for synagogues, the depression added economic and physical hardships to synagogues, which helped fuel the market for the mushroom synagogues. These synagogues were often sponsored by charities to raise revenue for operations. Often, established synagogues would agree to put those organizations higher on the charity list if the mushroom synagogue would cease operations. Ironically, while mushroom synagogues have mostly all gone away, many institutions use the model as a way of outreach to unaffiliated Jews or those who might seem hesitant to join a synagogue.
