= Sanhedria Murhevet =

Neighbourhood in northern Jerusalem

Coordinates: 31.802017°N 35.217962°E

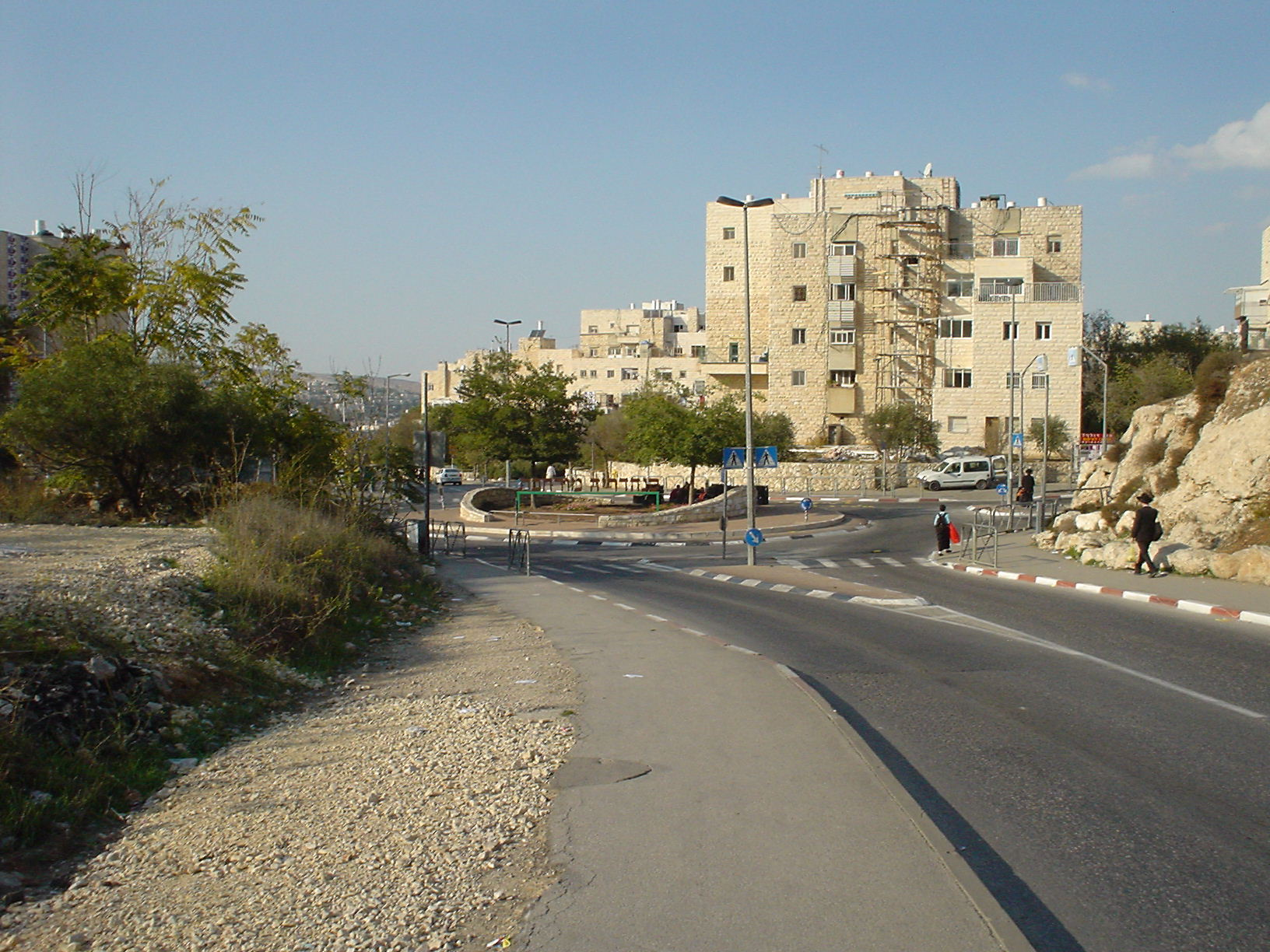
The entrance square to Sanhedria Murhevet.

Sanhedria HaMurhevet (Hebrew: סנהדריה המורחבת, also spelled Sanhedria HaMurchevet) is a Haredi neighborhood in Jerusalem. Its name translates as "expanded Sanhedria".

The neighborhood was founded in 1970 as a northern expansion of Sanhedria. The neighborhood is horseshoe-shaped. As of 2007 it has 784 residences. The neighborhood is closed to automobile traffic on Shabbat and Jewish holidays.

Sanhedria Murhevet is home to Yeshivat Tiferet Zvi, Yeshivat Kinyan Torah, Yeshiva Toras Moshe, Yeshiva Chofetz Chaim, the Jerusalem Kollel, and Kollel Meshech Chochma as well as some schools which include Hatzafon, Knesset Yehuda. The Har Hotzvim industrial complex and Yeshivat Horev are located nearby.

== Nahal Tzofim ==
The neighborhood overlooks Nahal Tzofim which is a tributary of Nahal Sorek. The slope on the southern bank of Nahal Tzofim, which the neighborhood overlooks, is an open area with many terraces constructed during the Second Temple period, used for agriculture in antiquity. Other artifacts of antique agriculture, such as threshing-stones and cisterns, and burial caves, continue along the creek's path.

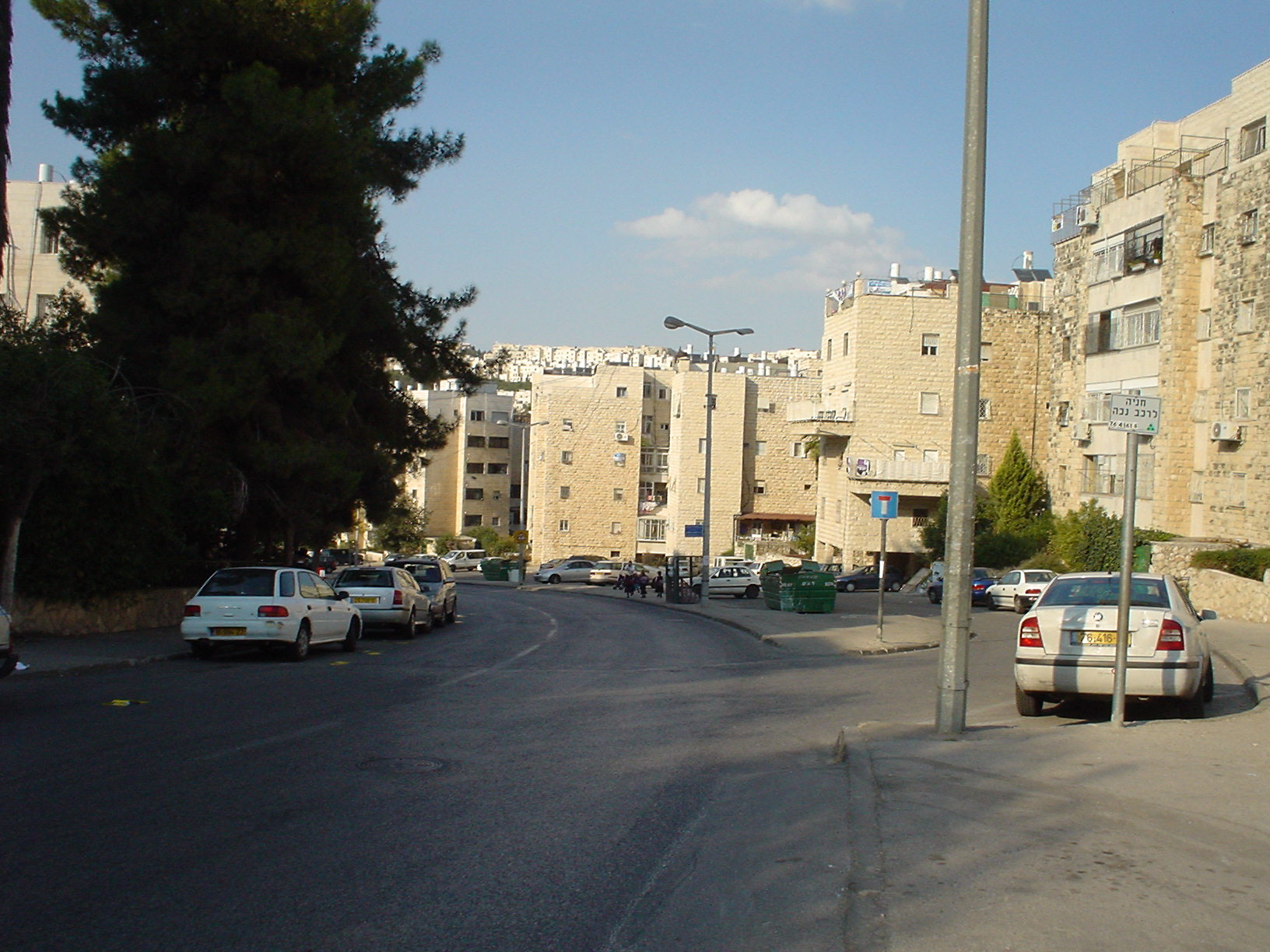
Ma'agalei HaRim Street in the neighborhood

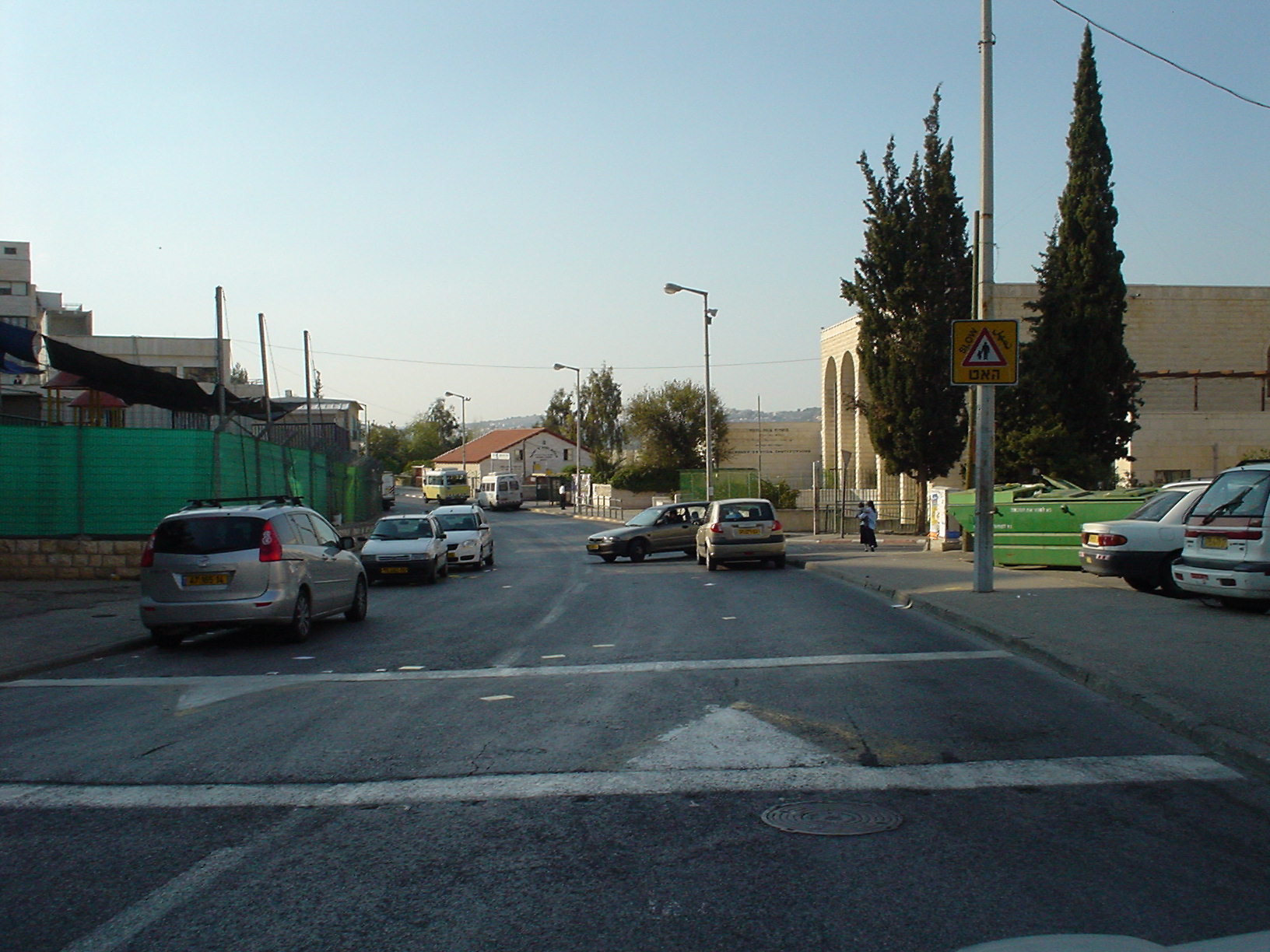
Ma'agalei HaRim Street

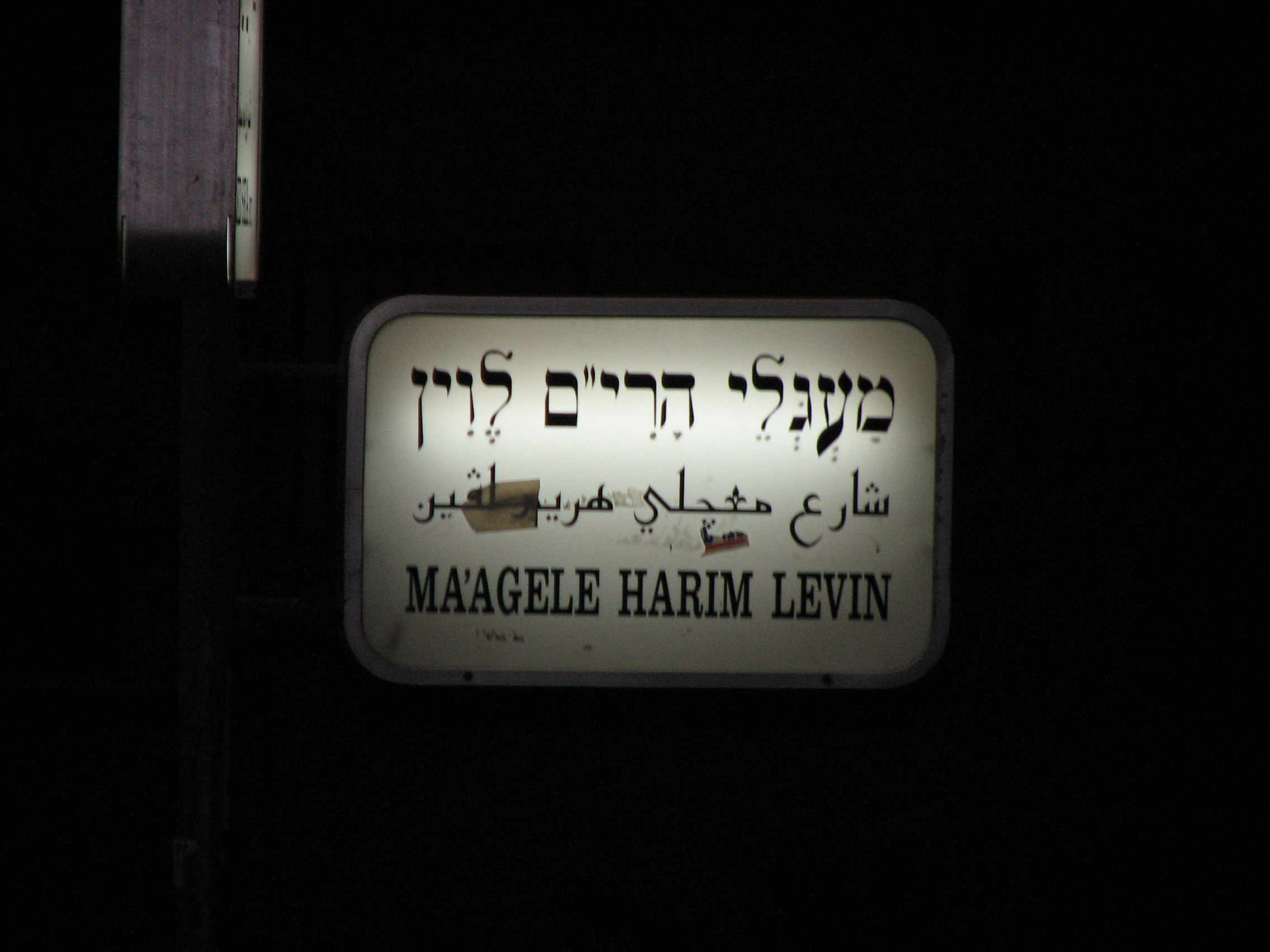
Street sign at the corner of Levin and Yam Suf at night

== Notable residents ==
=== Current residents ===
- Asher Arieli
- Yitzchak Berkovits
- Uri Lupolianski
- Yitzhak Yosef

=== Former residents ===
- Yehuda Meshi Zahav
- Yitzchok Zilber
- Haim Bar-Lev
