= Yitzchok Adlerstein =

American rabbi

Rabbi Yitzchok Adlerstein
- Born: Jeffrey Adlerstein; 1950 (age 75–76); New York City
- Education: B.A. Queens College, City University of New York
- Occupations: Professor, teacher, and author
- Employer(s): Loyola Law School, Simon Wiesenthal Center, and Yeshiva of Los Angeles
- Title: Rabbi

Yitzchok Adlerstein (born 1950 in New York) is an American Orthodox rabbi. He is the co-founder of Cross-Currents, an online journal of Orthodox Jewish thought, and regularly contributes to that site. He is on the editorial board of Klal Perspectives, an online journal of issues facing the Orthodox community.

== Career ==
Adlerstein served in an advisory and honorary position as one of the founding trustees of the Association for Jewish Outreach Programs (AJOP, known at the time as the Association for Jewish Outreach Professionals), delivering lectures and workshops to Orthodox Jewish outreach rabbis.

Adlerstein studied and received his advanced rabbinical ordination from the Yeshivas Chofetz Chaim in New York. He is a summa cum laude graduate of Queens College and a member of Phi Beta Kappa.

Adlerstein is the director of Interfaith Affairs for the Simon Wiesenthal Center. He holds the Sydney M. Irmas Adjunct Chair in Jewish Law and Ethics at Loyola Law School and teaches senior high school girls at Yeshiva University High Schools of Los Angeles.

He writes regularly for Cross-Currents. He is the author of Netivot Shalom: Insights on the Holidays and Avoda Based on the Writings of the Slonimer Rebbe, which was published by Maggid Books in 2019.

== Controversies ==
Rabbi Adlerstein has frequently participated in controversial debates that have relevance to Orthodox Jews and their world outlook. During the Slifkin controversy over how Orthodoxy views evolution, Adlerstein was quoted in The New York Times supporting Slifkin, who faced intense pressures from Haredi rabbis to withdraw his books.

Adlerstein is an outspoken opponent of the "Bible Code" and has written articles and given lectures with Barry Simon on the topic. Adlerstein criticized the methods and notions behind the workings of the Kabbalah Centre.

== Personal life ==
Adlerstein currently resides in Jerusalem with his wife, Reena.
