= Charlie Buttons =

American Jewish community figure (1944–2025)

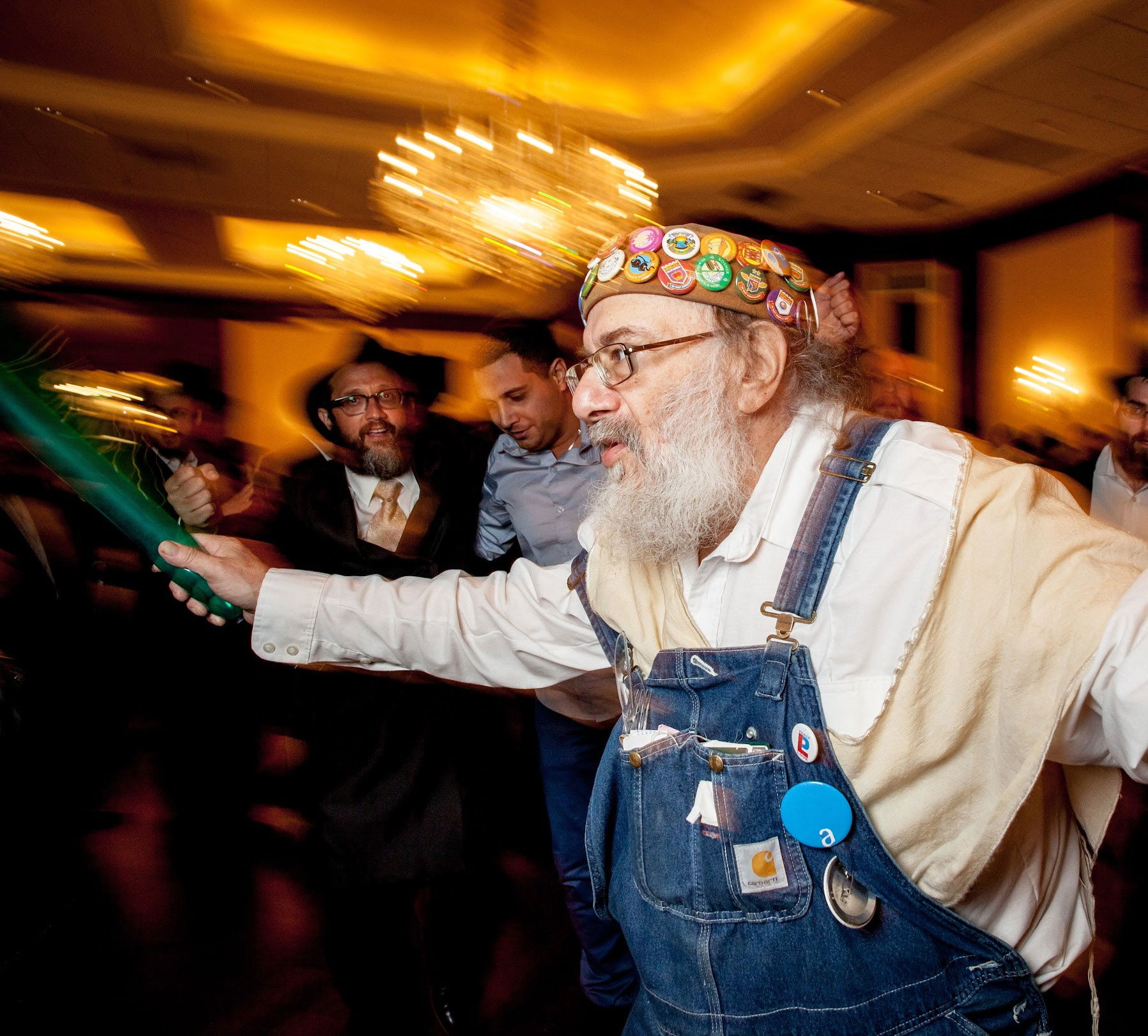
- Charlie Buttons distributes balloons at a wedding in Crown Heights
- Born: Charles Nassofer; July 9, 1944; Kearney, Nebraska, U.S.
- Died: May 8, 2025 (aged 80); Brooklyn, New York, U.S.
- Known for: Community presence in Crown Heights and Lincoln Square Synagogue

Charles Nassofer (July 9, 1944 – May 8, 2025), known as Charlie Buttons, was an American Jewish community figure known for his presence at Chabad events in Crown Heights, Brooklyn, and at Lincoln Square Synagogue in Manhattan. A regular at 770 Eastern Parkway, he was recognized for his warm interactions with the Lubavitcher Rebbe. He became widely known for attending simchas, distributing balloons, and wearing a button-covered yarmulke that earned him his nickname.

== Early life ==
Charles Nassofer was born on July 9, 1944, in Kearney, Nebraska, to Irving and Marcia Nassofer.

The family later moved to Brooklyn, New York, where he attended public school and Hebrew school at Congregation Beth Judah. He graduated from Brooklyn Technical High School and enrolled in college but did not complete his degree.

In 1964, during a visit to Florida, Charlie and his sister were involved in a car accident that left him with brain damage.

== Community role ==
In the 1970s, Nassofer became involved with the Chabad-Lubavitch movement after meeting a representative from the Lubavitch Youth Organization. He began spending time at Chabad headquarters at 770 Eastern Parkway and participated in outreach activities. Charlie became a fixture at 770 Eastern Parkway.

He was widely recognized for his frequent interactions with the Lubavitcher Rebbe, who would often smile and encourage him with a wave or gesture. Charlie became a regular attendee at celebrations across Crown Heights, bringing balloons to distribute to children. He also attended weddings, engagement parties, brises, and shalom zachars. He was often seen wearing a distinctive yarmulke covered in Jewish-themed buttons, including slogans promoting mitzvot and insignia from Tzivos Hashem.

He had frequent encounters with the Lubavitcher Rebbe, Rabbi Menachem Mendel Schneerson. On several occasions, he received wine from the Rebbe during the distribution of kos shel brachah. He was known to carry multiple cups and would explain that they represented concepts from Chabad philosophy.

== Involvement with Lincoln Square Synagogue ==
In addition to his presence in Crown Heights, Nassofer had a longstanding connection with Lincoln Square Synagogue in Manhattan.

During the 1970s and 1980s, he was active in the synagogue's educational and outreach programs, particularly the Beginner's Service led by Rabbi Ephraim Buchwald. He also participated in Purim plays and helped with various tasks including mailings.

Nassofer was trained by Rabbi Buchwald to kosher kitchens and provided this service across a range of homes in the New York area.

== Personality and sayings ==
Nassofer was known for his dry humor and playful calendar inventions, such as referring to days in Tevet as "the 23rd day of Chanukah" and declaring the days between his Hebrew and secular birthdays as "chol hamoed Charlie." When asked if he was Elijah the Prophet, he once responded that he couldn't be due to being a chronic latecomer.

== Later life and death ==
Nassofer later moved into a private home in Crown Heights and eventually into a Jewish nursing facility in Brooklyn due to declining health. He died on May 8, 2025, at the age of 80.
