= Yeshiva University High School =

Yeshiva University High School may refer to:

- Marsha Stern Talmudical Academy (Yeshiva University High School for Boys)
- Yeshiva University High School for Girls
- Yeshiva University High School of Los Angeles
