= Dovid Gottlieb =

Dovid Gottlieb (Hebrew: דוד גוטליב; born in 1943 as Dale Victor Gottlieb) is a senior faculty member at Ohr Somayach in Jerusalem. An author and lecturer, Rabbi Gottlieb received his Ph.D. in mathematical logic at Brandeis University and later became Associate Professor of Philosophy at Johns Hopkins University.

A student of Jean Van Heijenoort, his 1970 doctoral thesis was The Use of Formal Systems in Logic and Mathematics.

== Personal ==
Rabbi Gottlieb was married to Rebbetzin Leeba Gottlieb, who died in January 2020. He married Rebbetzin Tziporah Heller on May 12, 2020.

== Books ==
- The Informed Soul, Artscroll/Mesorah, 1990
- Reason to Believe , Mosaica Press, 2017
