= Ephraim Buchwald =

Rabbi

Rabbi Ephraim Buchwald is one of the leaders in the movement of Orthodox Jewish outreach in America today.

== Early life ==
Buchwald graduated from Yeshiva University High School for Boys in 1963. Buchwald studied at Yeshiva University, where he was a student of Rabbi Dr. Joseph B. Soloveitchik. He was ordained in 1975. He served from 1973 for 15 years as the Director of Education at Lincoln Square Synagogue in New York City, which became one of the largest and most successful centers for adult Jewish education programs in America. He also established and coordinated Lincoln Square's outreach program.

Buchwald has led the synagogue’s "Beginners Service," a special Shabbat service for people with little or no synagogue experience. Buchwald began the service in 1975; it combined prayers in Hebrew and English with discussion of the weekly Torah portion and an open question-and-answer format. He stepped down as its leader on June 27, 2026, after 50 years.

== National Jewish Outreach Program ==
In July 1987, Buchwald founded the National Jewish Outreach Program (NJOP). NJOP sponsors "Shabbat Across America/Canada" and "Read Hebrew America/Canada" campaigns, establishes Beginners Services and the "Turn Friday Night into Shabbat," "Passover Across America" and "Sukkot Across America" programs, as well as free "crash courses" in Hebrew reading, basic Judaism and Jewish history. These programs are now offered at more than 4,860 locations across North America and in 40 countries worldwide (as advertised by NJOP as of 12/13). Through these programs and advertising campaigns, NJOP has successfully reached more than 1,428,600 Jews in North America and engaged them in Jewish life. NJOP also has a presence on the web, offering "Jewish Treats: Juicy Bits of Judaism, Daily" (a daily email) and "Jewish Tweets" on twitter.com (as advertised by NJOP as of 12/13).

== AJOP ==
Rabbi Buchwald was the founding president and is now the honorary president of the Association of Jewish Outreach Programs (AJOP) (previously known as the Association for Jewish Outreach Professionals), which was established in 1988. Both NJOP and AJOP were initially funded by significant grants from the AVI CHAI Foundation, a Jewish philanthropy established by Sanford Bernstein, a financial investor who had himself become a Baal teshuva (a returnee to traditional Orthodox observance) and sought to further the cause of education and outreach to alienated and assimilated Jews worldwide.

== Honors ==
In November 1997 Buchwald was named to the Forward 50, a list of America's 50 most influential Jews, and has been part of Newsweek’s list of "top 50 Rabbis in America" the last three years. In May 2001, he was awarded an Honorary Doctorate of Humane Letters by Yeshiva University in recognition of his outreach work.

== Personal ==
Buchwald and his wife, Aidel, reside in New York City and are the parents of four children. They also have 18 grandchildren (including Straus Scholar Gavi Buchwald).
