= 200 Amsterdam =

Residential skyscraper in Manhattan, New York

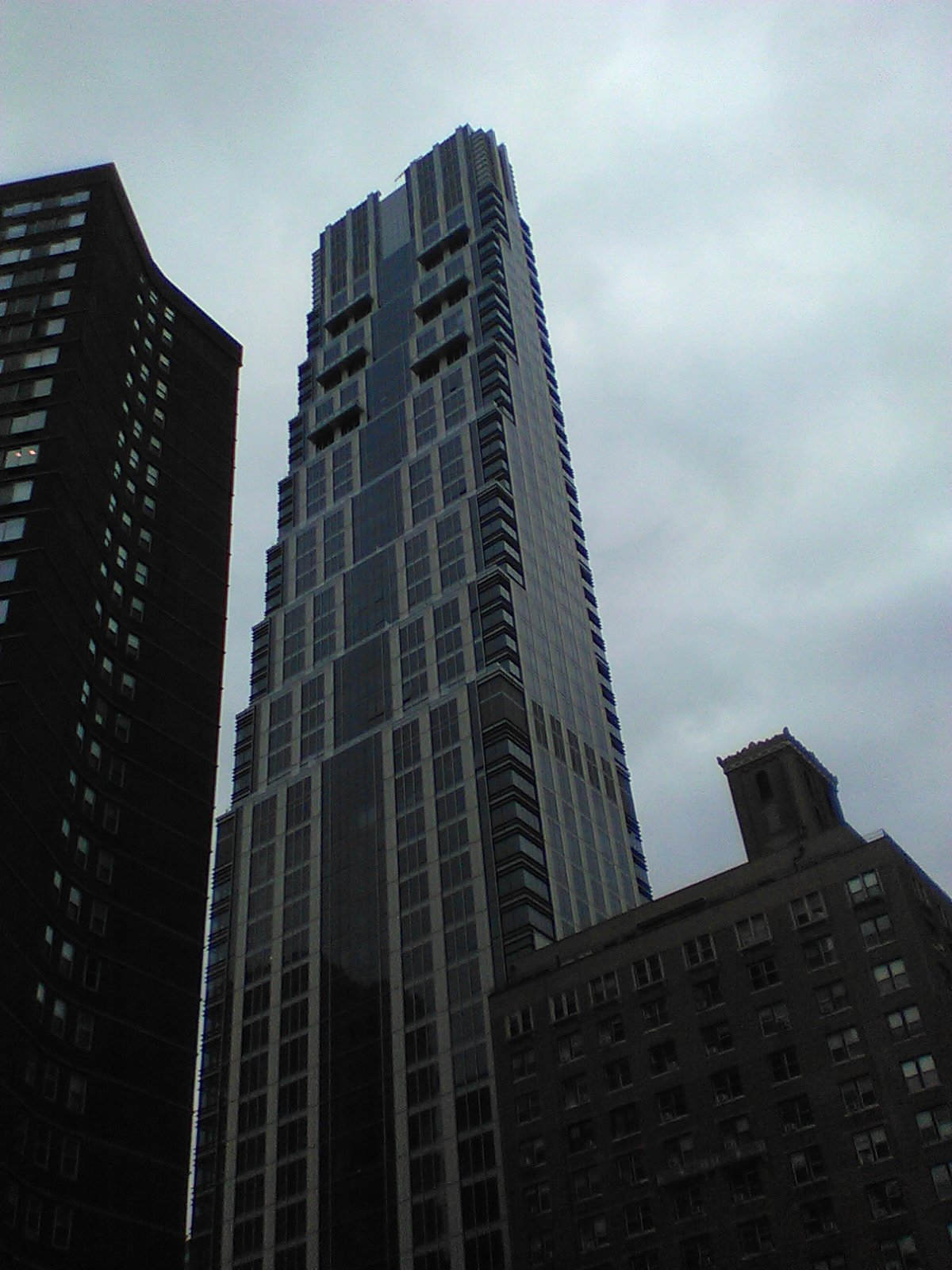
- Interactive map of the 200 Amsterdam area

General information
- Status: Completed
- Type: Residential
- Location: 200 Amsterdam Avenue; Manhattan, New York City
- Coordinates: 40.7768°N 73.9833°W
- Construction started: 2017
- Completed: 2021

Height
- Roof: 668 feet (204 m)

Technical details
- Floor count: 51
- Floor area: 283,000 square feet (26,300 m^{2})

Design and construction
- Architect: Elkus Manfredi Architects
- Developer: SJP Properties, Mitsui Fudosan America

200 Amsterdam is a residential skyscraper at the intersection of Amsterdam Avenue and 69th Street on the Upper West Side in Manhattan, New York City, United States. The lot was formerly occupied by the Lincoln Square Synagogue. The tower contains 112 condominiums.

The building stands as the second tallest building on the Upper West Side after topping out at 51 stories in August 2019, with 50 West 66th Street having taken the title from it with a height about 100 feet (30 m) higher. Buildings of comparable size exist within one thousand feet (300 m) to the south and east, including Tower 67 and the Park Millennium, which stand 49 and 47 stories tall, respectively. In February 2020, a state judge ruled that several upper floors would have to be removed due to zoning violations. In March 2021, the ruling was overruled on appeal. The building was completed in 2021.

== History ==
=== Planning ===
The site, formerly a synagogue constructed in 1971, was purchased by the developers for $275 million in October 2015. The building's design was officially unveiled in June 2016 and permits for the development were filed two months later in September 2016. Despite the project's initial lot spanning just 10,800 square feet (1,000 m^{2}), the developers expanded the zoning lot to over 100,000 square feet (9,300 m^{2}) by purchasing the development rights from parking lots at the neighboring Lincoln Towers. This allowed the project to aggregate floor area limits and build a much larger project upon the small site.

=== Opposition and legal challenges ===
In May 2017, two community groups began the first organized opposition to the tower's development, claiming that the building's zoning lot was illegal and could not encompass the additional development rights from the Lincoln Towers. Local New York City Council member Helen Rosenthal and Manhattan Borough President Gale Brewer endorsed the effort and a formal challenge was filed with the New York City Department of Buildings on May 15. In June, the Department of Buildings halted new permit issuance for the site until the challenge could be reviewed and ruled on.

At the end of June, the Department of Buildings filed a "Notice to Revoke" against the developers, meaning that the permit would be revoked unless the developers responded and solved issues that the Department had identified. Two weeks later, the Department ruled that the challenge had merit and rescinded the development's permit until the zoning lot was changed to comply with the law. By the end of September, the developers had responded to the Department of Building's concerns and demonstrated conformance with the law without changing the scope of the project.

The development received new construction permits on September 27, allowing the developers to begin excavation and foundation work for the building. However, in November the two community groups filed an appeal with the Board of Standards and Appeals, part of the New York City Office of Administrative Trials and Hearings, again challenging the legality of the development's zoning lot.

In February 2018, the local Community Board 7 noted its displeasure with the building, although legally the board had no power to stop or alter the development. On March 9, the assistant general counsel of the Department of Buildings sent a letter to the Board of Standards and Appeals which acknowledged that the permits issued for the development was "based on an incorrect interpretation of the Zoning Resolution." In July the Board of Standards and Appeals voted 3-1 to uphold the development's permit after which a community group moved to sue the Board in court.

=== Financing, construction, and continuing legal challenges ===
At the end of September, the project's crane was installed. Shortly after installation, the Department of Buildings ordered work to stop at the site until the developer installed sidewalk sheds to protect pedestrians from potential falling debris from the crane. Despite progress on the construction, a lawsuit in the New York Supreme Court was filed by the Municipal Art Society in October to appeal the Board of Standards and Appeals' decision from July. Several prominent local politicians including New York State Assembly members Linda Rosenthal and Richard N. Gottfried as well as Congressman Jerry Nadler supported the lawsuit.

In November, Sumitomo Mitsui Trust Bank provided a $425.8 million loan to finance construction of the development.

The New York Supreme Court ruled in March 2019 that the Board of Standards and Appeals had improperly applied the law and ordered the Board to review the project again. However, the court stopped short of revoking the development's permits which allowed construction to continue. Another motion for a temporary restraining order, which would have stopped work on the site, was denied in early April. A request for a preliminary injunction at the end of April was also denied, allowing construction to progress while the Board of Standards and Appeals reviewed the zoning challenge. By that time, the building had reached roughly 25 stories in height. At the end of June 2019, the Board of Standards and Appeals reaffirmed the building's permits after construction had reached the 40th floor.

At the end of July 2019, the Municipal Art Society filed another lawsuit in Manhattan Supreme Court to appeal the decision and attempt to stop the building's development, again alleging that the Board had improperly applied the zoning law when approving the building's permits. The building topped-out the following month, though work on the crown and facade proceeded through late 2019.

=== 2020 permit revocation and completion ===
On February 17, 2020, New York Supreme Court Justice W. Franc Perry ruled that the existing permit for 200 Amsterdam had been issued, as reported by Gothamist, "based on a 39-sided 'gerrymandered lot' that abused zoning protocol", and was therefore issued in error by the Department of Buildings, which was ordered to revoke the permit. The ruling would have required "potentially 20 or more" newly constructed floors to be removed. In early 2021, the finding of the lower courts was overruled on appeal with no modifications required.

The building was completed in 2021. When it was completed, it included an amenity area with a 75-foot-long (23 m) swimming pool, spa, and whirlpool. One of the apartments was used as a filming location for the TV series Succession, being depicted as the apartment of Roman Roy, one of the main characters. The final season of Succession, which aired in 2023, prompted a series of apartment sales in the building. In 2024, the penthouse was sold for $22.5 million.
