= Kiryat Sanz, Jerusalem =

Neighborhood of Jerusalem, Israel

Coordinates: 31.797983°N 35.211031°E

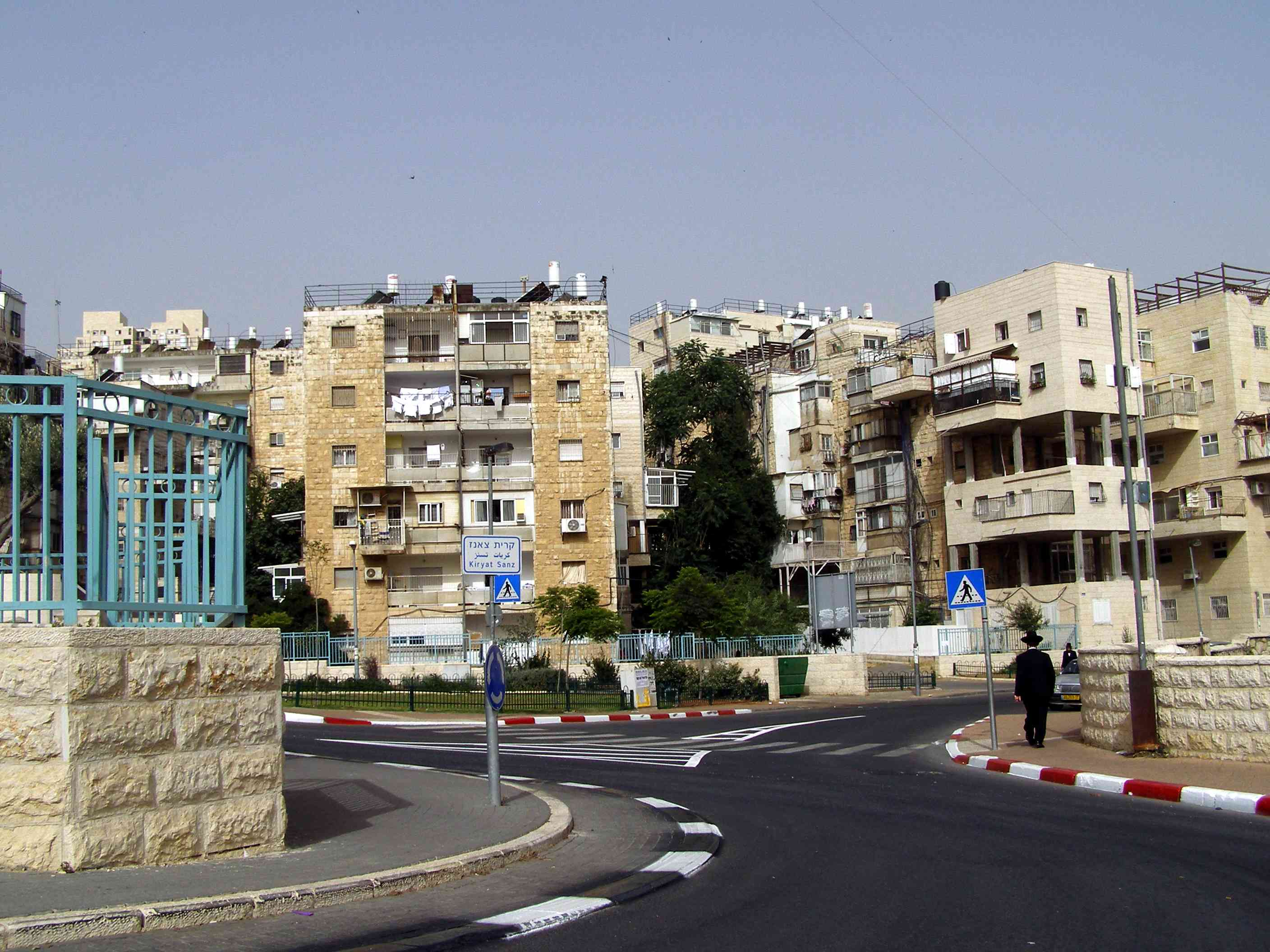
Kiryat Sanz neighborhood

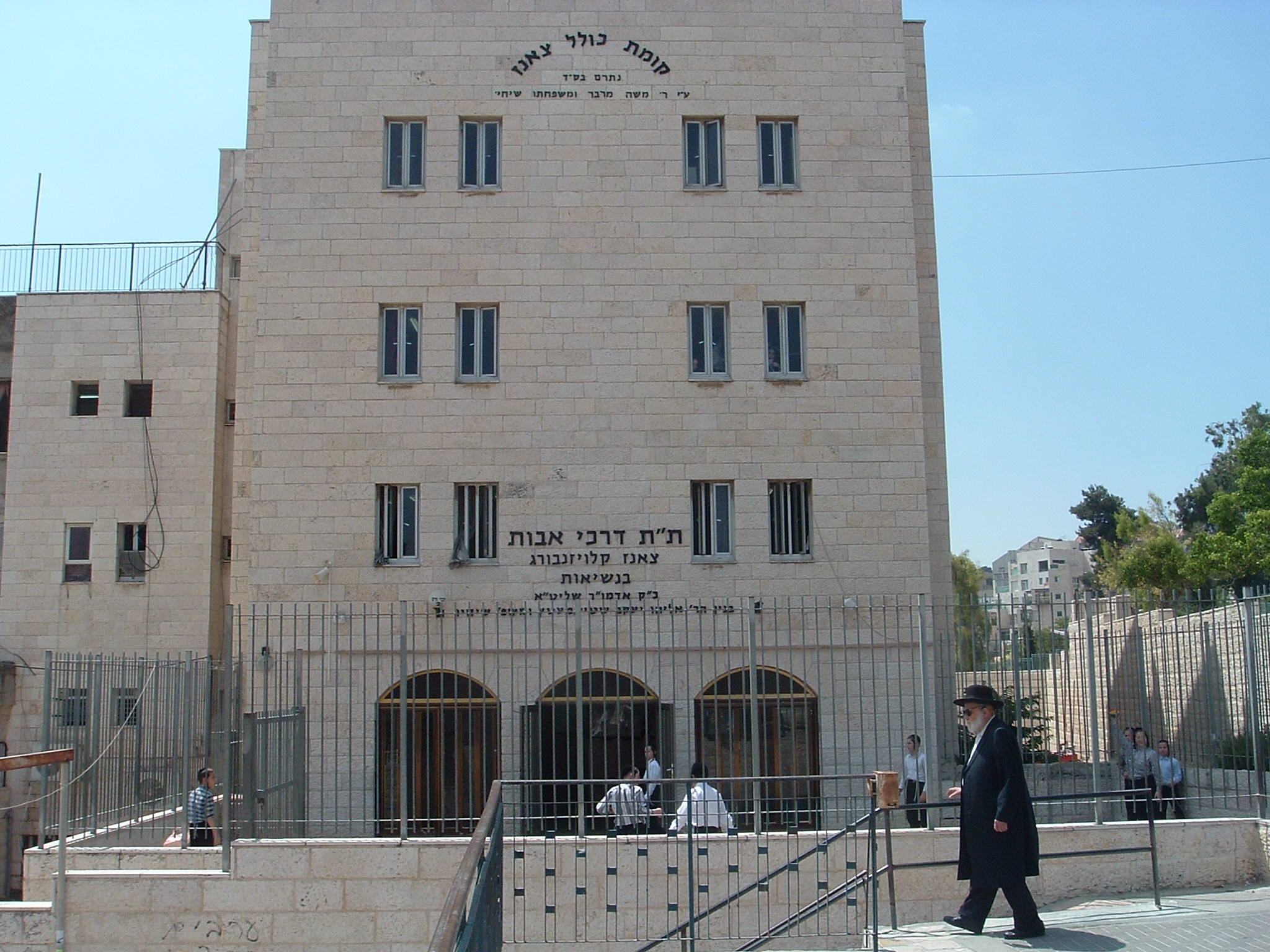
Sanz Kollel in the neighborhood

Kiryat Sanz (Hebrew: קריית צאנז) is a Haredi Jewish neighborhood in Jerusalem. It is located in the northwestern part of Jerusalem.

The neighborhood was established in 1965 by Jewish immigrants from Sanz in Galicia, largely as a center for their followers.

The neighborhood is bordered by the neighborhoods Kiryat Belz and Ezrat Torah.

== Landmarks ==
- EYAHT College of Jewish Studies for Women, founded by Rebbetzin Denah Weinberg
- The Yad Eliezer poverty-relief organization was founded and operated in Kiryat Sanz from 1980 to 2000 by residents Rabbi Yaakov and Hadassah Weisel. Today the organization is headquartered in the Shmuel HaNavi neighborhood.
