= EYAHT =

Coordinates: 31°47′48.58″N 35°12′40.53″E

EYAHT College of Jewish Studies for Women
- Hebrew: איה״ת

Location
- 22 Imrei Binah St. Kiryat Sanz, Jerusalem; Jerusalem

Information
- Opened: 1982
- Menahel: Rebbetzin Denah Weinberg
- Affiliation: Orthodox Judaism

EYAHT (Hebrew: איה״ת, a Hebrew abbreviation for the Biblical Hebrew: אשה יראת ה' היא תתהלל "It is for her fear of the LORD / That a woman is to be praised", Proverbs 31:30), was a full-time college for advanced Jewish learning for women in Jerusalem.

Geared to unaffiliated, college-educated and professional women aged 22–30 from English-speaking countries, EYAHT introduced women to the basics of Orthodox Judaism and encouraged them to integrate it into their lives. Most of its students became baalot teshuva ("returnees to the faith"). EYAHT has over 2,000 alumnae.

== History ==
The college was founded with seed money from Aish HaTorah in 1982 by Rebbetzin Denah Weinberg, wife of Aish HaTorah's rosh yeshiva, Rabbi Noah Weinberg. Classrooms were located in two ground-floor apartments across the street from the Weinbergs' home in Kiryat Sanz. Dormitory apartments were rented in surrounding buildings.

== Curriculum ==
EYAHT offered classes on Jewish philosophy, history, prayer, Parashah, Chumash, holidays and The 48 Ways to Wisdom (a curriculum developed by Weinberg based on Pirkei Avot 6:6) at beginning, intermediate and advanced levels. There was a focus on the role of the Jewish woman in her family and community, with classes in shalom bayit (domestic harmony) and chinuch habonim (raising Jewish children). Day and week programs were available.

== Alumni ==
Noteworthy alumnae include:

- Rebbetzin Lori Palatnik, author and Jewish educator
- Ayelet the Kosher Komic, women's entertainer

== New campus ==
Shortly after inaugurating a five-story, 15,400-square-foot (1,430 m^{2}) campus in the Romema neighborhood in 2014, EYAHT was closed.

== See also ==
- Baal teshuva
- Jewish fundamentalism
- Orthodox Judaism outreach
