= Neve Yerushalayim =

- נוה ירושלים
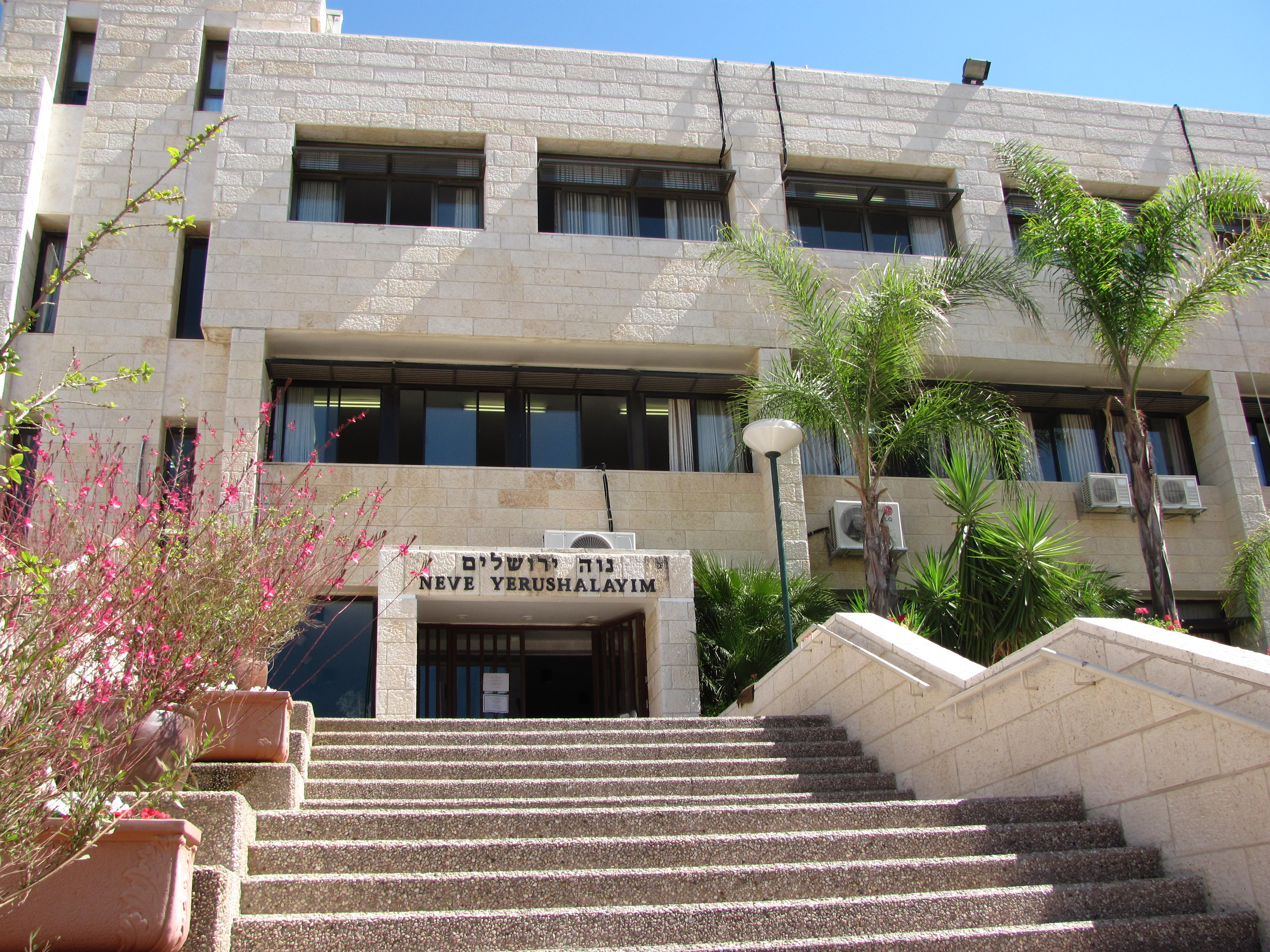

Location
- 1 Beit Yitzchok St. Har Nof; Jerusalem; Israel

Information
- School type: College
- Religious affiliation: Haredi Judaism
- Established: 1970
- Founder: Rabbi Dovid Refson
- Dean: Rabbi Dovid Refson
- Enrolment: 900
- Campus size: 6-acre (2.4 ha)
- Budget: $7 million
- Alumni: 35,000
- Website: nevey.org

Neve Yerushalayim (Hebrew: נוה ירושלים) is the oldest and largest college for Jewish women in the world. Founded in 1970 to educate baalot teshuva (female returnees to Orthodox Judaism) in the why and how of living an Orthodox Jewish life, Neve has approximately 35,000 alumni. Its campus in the Har Nof neighborhood of Jerusalem is also home to 11 schools and seminaries for post-high school, undergraduate, and graduate students from religious backgrounds.

== History ==
Neve was founded in 1970 by Rabbi Dovid Refson, the British-born alumnus of the Gateshead Yeshiva and Yeshivas Knesses Chizkiyahu. After his marriage, he entered the kollel at the Harry Fischel Institute in Jerusalem and began delivering shiurim to American students. Deciding to open his own yeshiva, he placed an advertisement in The Jerusalem Post and was surprised when three young women showed up. "I thought yeshivah meant for boys, but apparently, in some places, yeshivah can mean a girls' school as well", he said. The staff "adapted" to the new reality, and Neve was born. Soon after, Rabbi Moshe Chalkowski came on board as principal.

Students began arriving at the school on the recommendation of Rabbi Shlomo Freifeld, Rabbi Shlomo Carlebach, and the Chabad movement. The student body was older than Refson expected; while he was only 24 years old at the time, Neve's first students were in their late twenties and early thirties; some were as much as ten years his senior. In its early years, Neve was considered an unofficial sister school to the Ohr Somayach yeshiva for baal teshuva men in Jerusalem.

First located in the Bayit Vegan neighborhood of Jerusalem, Neve expanded in the 1970s with a Hebrew division, a preparatory school, and the one-year Shalhevet program. In the 1980s, Neve added a French division and the Machon Devorah seminary. The latter seminary has since been joined on campus by other seminaries designed for post-high-school women from religious backgrounds (see list below). According to Refson, the idea of adding seminaries to the baalot teshuvah campus was meant to augment the girls' experience of Judaism, "creating a culture where kashrus, Shabbos and tzniyus are taken for granted".

== Curriculum ==
Neve offers courses for beginner through advanced levels. From the start, instructors focused on the practical applications of Jewish law. Subjects include kashrut, the laws of family purity, and the laws of Shabbat and Jewish holidays. The curriculum also includes Tanakh and Jewish literature, aside from Talmud.

== Student body ==
The English-speaking student body at Neve hails from the United States, Canada, Great Britain, South Africa, and Australia. In 2014, the school maintained a student body of 900 women. As of 2019, the average age of students is post-graduate; many obtained professional qualifications before coming to study here. As of 2019, Neve has approximately 35,000 alumni. The college is also a drop-in site for North American, South American, and Australian kiruv groups, and summer visits by college students, Birthright groups, and visiting professionals.

== Campus ==
Neve acquired its 6-acre (2.4 ha) campus in Har Nof with significant funding from the Committee for Aid and Development Abroad chaired by United States Senator Daniel Inouye. The main building and two dormitories opened in 1987. As of 2016, the campus includes 12 academic buildings and eight dormitories, plus an auditorium, amphitheater, and synagogue. The Family Institute at Neve Yerushalayim, a family counseling clinic staffed by over 60 religious therapists, sees more than 400 clients monthly.

== Faculty ==
=== Administration ===
- Rabbi Dovid Refson, founder and dean
- Rabbi Yona Aryeh Refson, chief operating officer
- Rabbi Moshe Chalkowski, founding principal
- Rabbi Avraham Edelstein, director of education
- Chaya Levine, dean of students

=== Teachers ===
Teachers at Neve have become noted authors, speakers, and academics in the Orthodox world. They include:

- Rabbi Dr. David Refson
- Rabbi Yona Arieh Refson
- Rebbetzin Tziporah Heller
- Rabbi Avraham Edelstein
- Mrs. Chaya Levine
- Rabbi Eliezer Liff
- Rabbi Yaakov (Jerrold) Marcus
- Mrs. Chaya Levitan
- Mrs. Malka Glick
- Mrs. Raquel Kirszenbaum
- Mrs. Rutie Abraham
- Rabbi Haim Gottesman
- Rabbi Menachem Salasnik
- Dayan Shlomo Cohen
- Rabbi Avi Klotz
- Mrs. Rina Silber
- Mrs. Leah Levy
- Mrs. Ayelet Elnekave
- Mrs. Sarah Slater
- Mrs. Jenny Serle
- Mrs. Tobi Stern
- Miss Galia Kalfa
- Rabbi Avraham Kilstein

== Notable alumni ==
- Ahuva Gray, Jewish convert and author
- Lori Palatnik, founder of the Jewish Women’s Renaissance Project

== Campus overview ==
=== Colleges ===
- Neve School of General Jewish Studies – targets English-speaking students
- Neve Shoshana – mainly for Hebrew speaking students residing in Israel.

=== High schools ===
- Seminar Lapidot

=== Post high-school programs ===
- Bnos Avigail - one-year BY seminary headed by Rabbi Dovid Kass and Rebbetzin Tzipora Heller
- Bnos Sarah – one-year teacher training program with advanced academic curriculum in Limudei Kodesh for graduates of Bais Yaakov high schools
- Midreshet Tehillah (founded in 2002) – focuses on text-based learning of Tanakh, halakha, and Jewish philosophy

=== Post-seminary programs ===
- Maalot Yerushalayim (founded 1984) – offers programs of advanced Judaic studies and courses in various academic areas, with credits toward a B.A. degree from Thomas Edison State University and Gratz College.
- Rinat Tzipporah
- Center for Foreign Studies

=== Post-graduate programs ===
- The Family Institute

== See also ==
- Baal teshuva
- Bais Yaakov
- Jewish fundamentalism
- Midrasha
- Orthodox Judaism outreach
- Women in Judaism
