= Lori Palatnik =

Lori Palatnik (born 7 Oct 1960) is the founding director of Momentum. Momentum works to strengthen Jewish identity and connection to Israel through young mothers in their communities. She is an educator, public speaker, and community activist.

== Biography ==
Born in 1960, Palatnik grew up in a Conservative Jewish family in Toronto, Canada. She majored in communications at the University of Windsor and earned a special degree in advertising. She began her career in radio copywriting.

In 1985 she was a participant on the first Jerusalem Fellowships trip to Israel, and her experience was so positive that she decided to take time off to learn more about Judaism. She studied for a year at the EYAHT and Neve Yerushalayim colleges for advanced Jewish learning in Jerusalem. She returned briefly to Toronto for a writing job for Aish HaTorah, and afterward returned to Israel, where she met her husband, Yaakov Palatnik, a native of Chicago. and became an Orthodox Jewish outreach educator, public speaker, and author. They have five children.

They were the founding rabbi and rebbetzin of Toronto's Village Shul, a family synagogue in Forest Hill, Toronto, which they led for 11 years. During that time, Lori also hosted The Jewish Journal, a Toronto television show.

The Palatniks next moved to Denver, Colorado, where for the next four years he worked with Aish Denver and she was educational and program director for the Aish-Ahavas Yisrael project. The couple also co-hosted a weekly Denver radio show called The Palatniks on 630-KHOW.

In 2005, the Palatniks relocated to Washington, D.C., where Rabbi Palatnik became executive director of Aish Washington, D.C. In 2008 Lori was one of eight founders of the Jewish Women's Renaissance Project, now called Momentum, an outreach effort dubbed "Birthright for Women". As of 2020, Momentum has brought more than 20,000 women to Israel on a free, eight-day tour and learn program; participants only pay for their airfare. A 2010 poll of tour participants revealed that "76 per cent increased their attendance at Jewish services, 90.3 per cent increased their Jewish learning, and 75.4 per cent increased their observance of Shabbat" after participating in the tour.

She is a popular speaker for women's groups and Jewish conferences in North America, the United Kingdom, South Africa, Central America, South America and Israel.

=== Kidney donor ===
In 2008, Palatnik revealed that she had donated one of her kidneys to a stranger. She explained her rationale in an article on Aish.com, in a live video performance, and in speeches covered by local press.

== Honors ==
In 2025, Lori received The Global Peace Prize from Nestpoint at The Kennedy Center in Washington, DC "for dedicating her life to fostering dialogue, understanding, and peace across a multitude of cultures and communities.”

In 2023, Lori received The Jerusalem Unity Prize (International Category) on behalf of Momentum at Beit HaNassi, the President's House.

On International's Women's Day, March 2023, Lori was named one of Masa's Inspiring Twelve, Jewish Women Working to Make a Difference

In 2022, Lori was named "One of the 50 of Our Favorite Jewish Women Right Now" by JOOL.

In 2020, the Israeli government chose her to light "The Diaspora Torch", one of 12 torches at Israel's 72nd Independence Day ceremony. "Momentum works tirelessly to strengthen Jewish identity and connection to Israel through young mothers in their communities," wrote Culture and Sports Minister Miri Regev. "Rebbetzin Lori is a leading, unique and exciting version of the 'Queen of the Desert', a Zionist who loves Israel, two values for which Momentum never stops striving."

In 2020, Izzy named her one of the "Global Jewish 100", recognizing people who are moving Jewish culture forward in the world. Individuals were selected according to their accomplishments, influence and impact.

In 2020, the Times of Israel featured her blog post about the coronavirus.

In 2015 Hadassah added her to the list of "Most Outstanding Jewish American Women of Our Time".

In 2013 she was recognized as one of the nation's "Ten Women to Watch" by Jewish Women International.

In 2010, she was a semi-finalist for the Jewish Community Heroes award presented by the Jewish Federations of North America. She received 25,208 online votes out of 311,265 votes cast.

Her 2002 book, Gossip: Ten Pathways to Eliminate It from Your Life and Transform Your Soul (co-authored with Bob Burg), was featured on the Dr. Laura show as a recommended book.

== Bibliography ==
=== Books ===
- Friday Night and Beyond: The Shabbat experience step-by-step, 1994
- Gossip: Ten Pathways to Eliminate It from Your Life and Transform Your Soul (with Bob Burg), 2002
- Remember My Soul: What to do in memory of a loved one — A path of reflection and inspiration for shiva, the stages of Jewish mourning, and beyond (with Rabbi Yaakov Palatnik), K'hal Publishing, 2008
- Turn Your Husband Into Your Soul Mate, 2015

=== Other ===
In addition to her books, she has contributed to the anthology, Heaven on Earth and Jewish Women Speak about Jewish Matters.

She is also a blogger for The Times of Israel.

=== Audio cassettes ===
- Holy Diner: Shabbat, 20-cassette series, 1999
