= Shlomo Einhorn =

American Orthodox rabbi

Shlomo Einhorn (born January 21, 1979) is an Orthodox rabbi who has previously served as Dean of School at Yeshivat Yavneh (Yavneh Hebrew Academy) in Los Angeles. He is also a lecturer, educator, and author.

== Career ==
After receiving semicha and a master's degree in education from Yeshiva University, Einhorn began his rabbinic career as an intern rabbi at Manhattan's Lincoln Square Synagogue.

In 2005, Einhorn became the head rabbi of New York's West Side Institutional Synagogue. Seven years later the shul was drawing over 400 people every week. In 2010, the Orthodox Union gave Einhorn his own think tank to craft programming for other synagogues across America.

Einhorn holds a record for the longest continuous Torah class. The 18-hour class was a fundraiser, bringing in over $250,000 to support Jewish education. In 2017, Einhorn ran a 19-hour fundraiser that doubled the previous amount and raised over $500,000.

In 2012, Einhorn moved back to his hometown of Los Angeles to serve as rav and dean of Yavneh Hebrew Academy, an Orthodox prep school, and as the rabbi of its congregation.

In 2015, Einhorn released an introspective guide, weaving together pop culture and ancient Jewish wisdom, and its complementary music album, both titled Judaism Alive. Einhorn uses New Age thought, self-help ethos, and pop culture ideas. to help explain the Torah. The New Age band Enigma, for example, inspired his "Social Sermon" concept and he once brought Roger Daltrey of the Who to his synagogue to talk about the importance of charitable giving.

Einhorn added a second album to Judaism Alive called "Teshuva". This album tells the story of repentance and return through music and Jewish ideas. Celebrity musicians and vocalists are featured throughout the album. The album is produced by Kaela Sinclair, lead vocalist of M83. In 2020, Einhorn produced a Hebrew Bible designed for teens.

Einhorn concluded his tenure at Yeshivat Yavneh in 2024. In 2025 he founded Mallacore, a consultancy that deploys artificial-intelligence systems for mid-size businesses and nonprofits. In December 2025 he published The Legend: AI Deployment Strategies for Advanced Builders.
