= Tziporah Heller =

American-born Haredi educator and author

Rebbetzin Tziporah Heller Gottlieb
- ציפורה הלר גוטליב
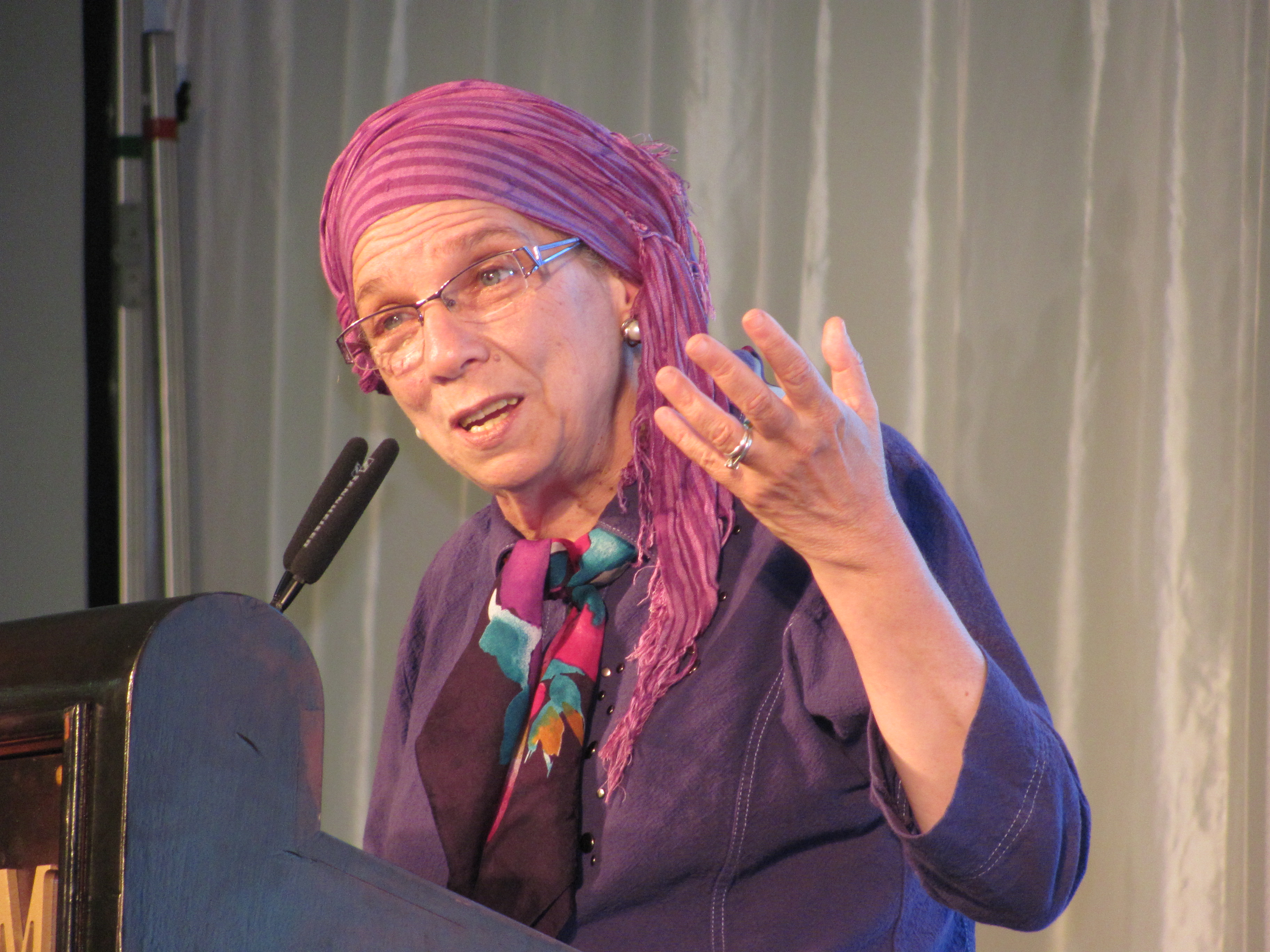
- Heller at the Dirshu Siyum HaShas in Jerusalem, July 2012
- Born: Tziporah Krasner; Brooklyn, New York, United States
- Occupations: Jewish studies teacher; author; speaker
- Years active: 1980–present
- Employer: Neve Yerushalayim
- Spouses: Rabbi Avraham Dovid Heller (m. 1967; died 2013) Rabbi Dovid Gottlieb (m. 2020)
- Website: tziporahhellergottlieb.com

Tziporah Heller Gottlieb (Hebrew: ציפורה הלר גוטליב) is an American-born Haredi educator, author, and speaker based in Jerusalem. She is a senior faculty member at the Neve Yerushalayim College for Women, principal of the Bnos Avigail seminary on the Neve campus, and a lecturer for the online Jewish college, Naaleh.com. She specializes in textual analysis of Biblical literature and Jewish philosophy, and exploration of the role of women in Judaism. The author of eight books, she is also a weekly columnist for the Hamodia newspaper.

== Early life and education ==
Born Tziporah Krasner in Brooklyn, New York, she studied at the Bais Yaakov elementary school. From 1966 to 1967, she attended the Rav Wolf Seminary in Bnei Brak.

== Career ==
Following her marriage in 1967, she and her husband, Avraham Dovid Heller, resided for two years in the Galilee community of Segev, in an effort to establish a kollel there. After their return to Jerusalem, her husband became a lecturer at Ohr Somayach, and, later, the administrator of Yeshiva Pachad Yitzchok, located near their home in Har Nof. In 1970, she began teaching at the Neve Yerushalayim College of Jewish Studies for Women in the same neighborhood, becoming a full-time faculty member in 1980. In 2015, she became principal of the Bnos Avigail seminary on the Neve campus.

Heller specializes in textual analysis of Biblical literature and Jewish philosophy, with a focus on the commentaries of Rambam and Maharal. She also lectures on women in Judaism, and "the lives of women in the Bible and Prophets". She is noted for her ability to bring "lofty concepts" down to a practical level, embellished with true-life stories and a sense of humor. Her views on the role of women in Judaism are frequently cited.

She is also a lecturer for the online Jewish college Naaleh.com, and a weekly columnist for the Hamodia newspaper. Her 2000 book, This Way Up: Torah essays on spiritual growth, was culled from her columns in that newspaper in the 1990s. She conducts international speaking tours twice yearly. She has thousands of students around the globe, and her approbation is valued in the Jewish publishing world. In 2011, she was nominated for the Jewish Community Heroes award presented by the Jewish Federations of North America.

== Personal ==
In 1967, she married Avraham Dovid Heller (1944–2013), and the two made aliyah to Israel. The couple had 14 children, and hosted many guests for Shabbat and Jewish holidays. They were married for 46 years, until Rabbi Heller's death in 2013.

On Lag BaOmer 2020, she remarried to Rabbi Dovid Gottlieb.

Heller's son-in-law, Shmuel Goldstein, was seriously injured in the 2014 Jerusalem synagogue attack. Following the attack, Heller widely disseminated a letter that she had written to her family and friends describing the event, and also spoke to the media.

== Bibliography ==
- Return: Your Path to Lasting Change. Menucha. 2015. ISBN 9781495172540.
- The Balancing Act: How to bring the power and passion of Torah into our homes, our children – and ourselves. Shaar Press. 2012. ISBN 9781422613221.
- Battle Plans: How to Fight the Yetzer Hara : According to Maharal, Ramchal, Chassidic and Mussar Masters. Shaar Press. 2009. ISBN 9781422608968. (with Sara Yoheved Rigler)
- Here You Are: Exploring the meaning of life's moments. Targum Press. 2008. ISBN 978-1-56871-486-8.
- Let's Face It!: The 8 Essential Challenges of Living. Targum Press. 2005. ISBN 9781568713663.
- Our Bodies, Our Souls: A Jewish Perspective on Feminine Spirituality. Targum Press. 2003. ISBN 9781568712161.
- This Way Up: Torah Essays on Spiritual Growth. Feldheim Publishers. 2000. ISBN 9781583304167.
- More Precious Than Pearls: Selected Insights Into the Qualities of the Ideal Woman : Based on Eshes Chayil. Feldheim Publishers. 1993. ISBN 9780873066617.

== Sources ==
- Bell, Yitzchok Leib, ed. (2012). Between Me & You: Heartfelt Prayers for Each Jewish Woman. Nachas Books. ISBN 978-1928822608.
- Einhorn, Rosie; Zimmerman, Sherry S. (2001). In the Beginning: How to survive your engagement and build a great marriage. Targum Press. ISBN 1568712901.
- Gray, Ahuvah (2004). Gifts of a Stranger: A Convert's Round-the-world Travels and Spiritual Journeys. Targum Press. ISBN 1568713312.
- Hager, Chaya Diane (2006). From Bogota to Madrid to Jerusalem: A family's fascinating journey. Israel Book Shop. ISBN 1931681686.
- Heller, Tziporah (1993). More Precious Than Pearls: Selected Insights Into the Qualities of the Ideal Woman Based on Eshes Chayil. Feldheim Publishers. ISBN 0873066618.
- Heller, Tziporah (2000). This Way Up: Torah essays on spiritual growth. Feldheim Publishers. ISBN 1583304169.
- Levine, David, ed. (2005). Get the Ring: How to find and keep the right one for life. Warm Wisdom Press. ISBN 0972621555.
- Rubinstein, Yehudah Yonah (2002). Dancing Through Time: And other essays. Targum Press. ISBN 1568712081.
- Shalit, Wendy (2007). Girls Gone Mild: Young women reclaim self-respect and find it's not bad to be good. Random House Publishing Group. p. 104. ISBN 978-1588365859.
