= The Jerusalem Kollel =

- Formation: 2002
- Type: Kollel
- Location: 140 מעגלי הרי"ם לוין, Sanhedria Murchevet, Jerusalem
- Members: 80+
- Official language: English, Hebrew,
- Dean: Rabbi Yitzchak Berkovits
- Staff: 15-20
- Website: www.thejerusalemkollel.com

The Jerusalem Kollel is a rabbinic education program with the stated goal of training kollel couples to assume positions of leadership in Jewish communities worldwide. The intensive 3-year program covers the laws of Shabbat, Nidah, and Issur v'Heter as well as a large body of other legal areas and in addition to Jewish Philosophy and Ethics. There is also an additional training component which includes such areas as public speaking, rabbinic counselling, kashrus, non-profit management among other things.

Established in the autumn of the Jewish calendar year 5762 (2002), the kollel opened with twenty young men. As of 2022, the Kollel maintained a student body of approximately 60 handpicked couples and had placed over 300 alumni in positions of community leadership throughout the world.

The Dean of the Kollel is Rabbi Yitzchak Berkovits, a respected advisor on contemporary halachic issues, especially for Jerusalem’s English-speaking haredi community. Rabbi Berkovits was a student of the Mir yeshiva (Jerusalem) and served as Menahel Ruchani of Yeshivas Aish HaTorah in Jerusalem for 16 years, before helping to start the JK. In August 2019, he was named rosh yeshiva, of Yeshivas Aish HaTorah a position that had been vacant since the 2009 death of founding dean, Rabbi Noah Weinberg.

== Staff ==
- Dean: Rabbi Yitchak Berkovits (Rosh Yeshivah - Aish Jerusalem; Nasi - AISH Global)
- CEO: Rabbi Yaakov Blackman (formerly Director of Education, Yeshivas Aish HaTorah)
- Director of Resource Development: Rabbi Josh Boretsky (formerly Director of the Jewel Women's educational program)

== Adjunct staff ==
- Roshei Chabura
  - Rabbi Binyamin Feldman
  - Rabbi Gabi Kruskal
  - Rabbi Dovid Steinhauer
  - Rabbi Yosef Gollub
  - Rabbi Binyamin Goldberg
- Adjunct Staff (partial list for training program)
  - Rabbi Motti Berger (Senior Lecturer - Aish HaTorah)
  - Rabbi Aryeh Wolbe (Director of Torch, Houston)
  - Rabbi Yaakov Marcus (Senior Lecturer - Neve Yerushalayim)
  - Gedalya Rosen
  - Eliezer Blatt
  - Rabbi Mordechai Kuber
  - Dr. Hillel Davis
- Former Roshei Chabura
  - Rabbi Yehonason Gefen
  - Rabbi Yossi Stillerman
  - Rabbi Mattisyahu Friedman

The Women's Program is headed by Rebbetzin Chana Kalsmith.
