= Lev Palatnyk =

Ukrainian physicist

Lev Samiylovych Palatnik (Ukrainian: Лев Самійлович Палатник; 26 April 1909 in Poltava – 4 June 1994 in Kharkiv) was a Soviet and Ukrainian physicist known for his contributions in the field of thin film physics and film material.

In 1926, he graduated from the Poltava Industrial and Technical School. He successfully defended his thesis at the age of 43.
