= Yaacov Haber =

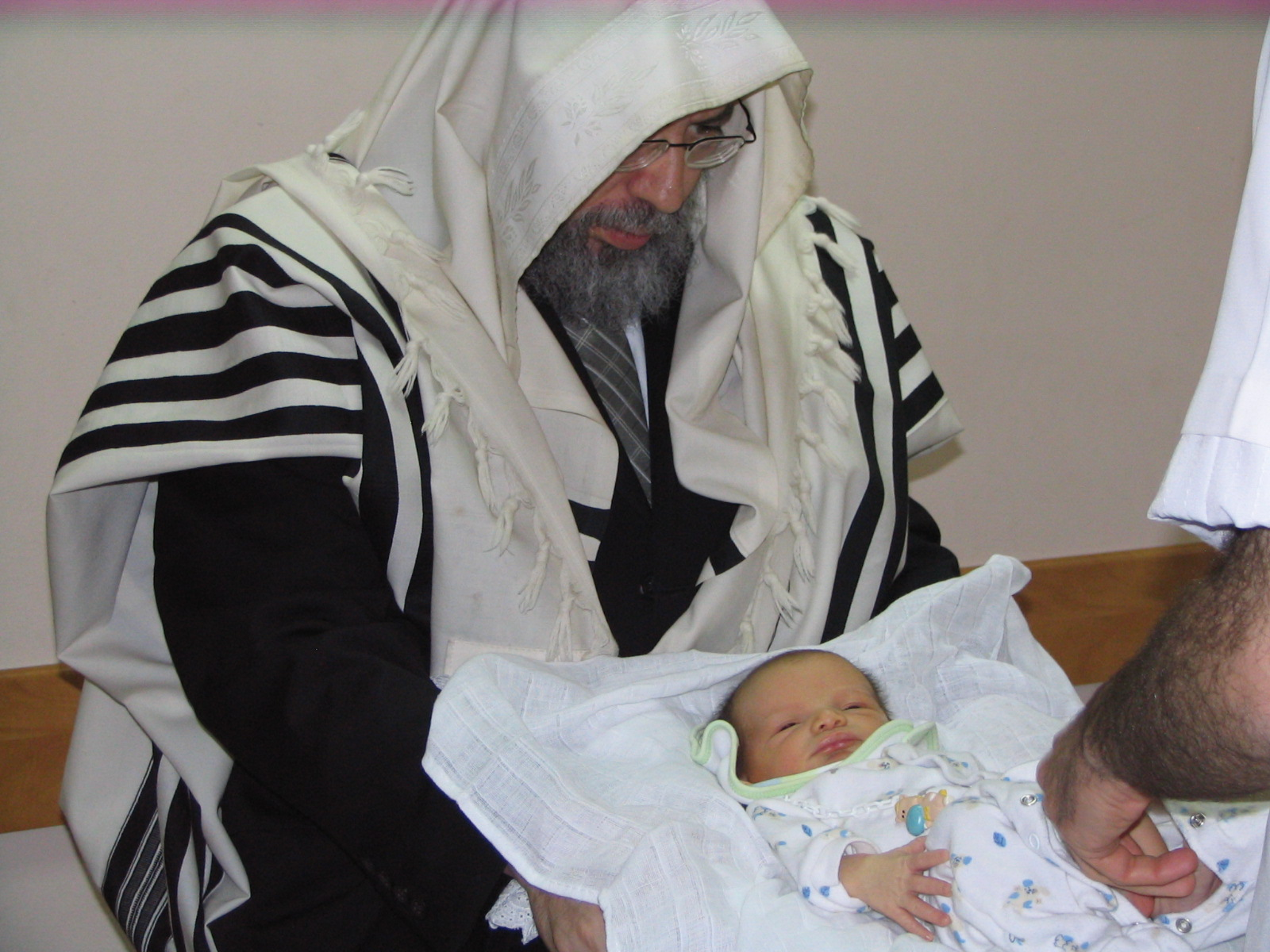
Rabbi Haber acting as sandek for a Brit milah, May 2009

Yaacov Haber is a Jerusalem-based rabbi, author and educator.

== Biography ==
Rabbi Haber was ordained in Jerusalem by Rabbi Chaim Pinchas Scheinberg of Yeshivah Torah Ore and by Chacham Avrohom Ochana of Yeshivah Ahavat Shalom.

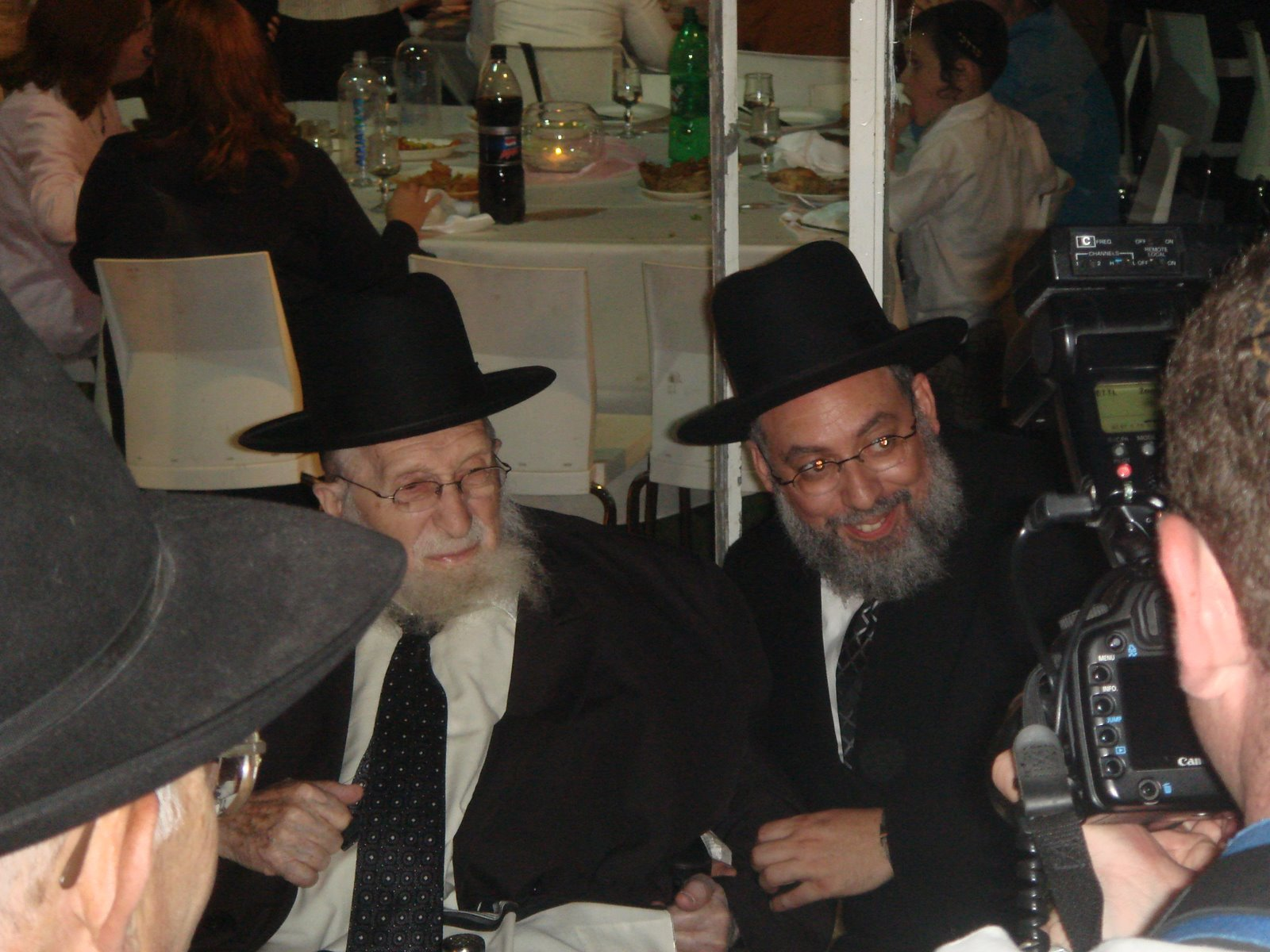
Rabbi Haber with his teacher, Rabbi Chaim P. Scheinberg

After his ordination in Israel, Rabbi Haber returned to his hometown of Buffalo, New York in 1979 with his family to found the Torah Center of Buffalo. During his ten years in Buffalo he served as a spiritual leader, first of the Amherst Synagogue and later at Congregation Achei Tmimim (also known as the Saranac Synagogue).

Subsequently, he founded an adult education program, the Australian Institute of Torah in Melbourne, Australia. Rabbi Haber returned to the United States to become the National Director of Jewish Education for the Orthodox Union. He created learning programs such as the Pardes Project. Rabbi Haber succeeded Rabbi Berel Wein as the Rav of Bais Torah Congregation in Monsey, New York.

Rabbi Haber serves as President of Mosaica Press. He is the author of books in English and Hebrew.

Since Rosh Hashana 5769 (2008), Rabbi Haber has held the position of Rabbi of Kehillas Shivtei Yeshurun in Ramat Beit Shemesh, where he currently lives with his wife, Bayle, and children.

== Trivia ==
On February 12, 2009, Rabbi Haber was booked aboard Colgan Air Flight 3407 from Newark, NJ, to Buffalo, NY, but was forced to miss the flight because powerful winds prevented him from driving to the airport. The flight crashed on arrival in Buffalo, killing all 49 people on board.

== Publications ==
- Conversation of Torah
- Sefiros: Spiritual Refinement Through Counting the Omer (With David Sedley) (TorahLab Publishers: 2008/ Judaica Press 2009) (150 pp.; ISBN 9781607630104)
- Lev Avos on Pirkei Avos (Hebrew) (TorahLab Publishers: 2007)
- Reachings - Talks on Torah
- Critical Issues for Jews of Today
- The First Ten Days
- Chidushei Rav Yosef Engel al HaTorah (Hebrew)
- New Heights in Jewish Prayer With 44 Hours of Audio
