= Yeshiva University High School of Los Angeles =

Yeshiva high school in Los Angeles, California, United States

- YULA

Location
- Boys: 9760 W. Pico Blvd. Los Angeles, CA 90035; Girls: 1619 S. Robertson Blvd. Los Angeles, CA 90035; Los Angeles, California; United States

Information
- Type: Independent, Yeshiva
- Motto: Primacy and Relevancy of Torah, Uncompromising General Studies, and Character Development (boys); Torah Umada Lchatchila (girls).
- Established: 1979; 47 years ago
- Founder: Marvin Hier
- Religion: Modern Orthodox Judaism
- NCES School ID: 01899004, A9101504
- General studies principal: Yehudis Benhamou (girls, interim boys)
- Judaic studies principals: Shimon Abramczik (boys); Racheli W. Luftglass (girls)
- Head of school: Arye Sufrin
- Faculty: 36.1 FTE (girls); 28.9 FTE (boys) (2017–2018)
- Grades: 9–12
- Gender: Two single-sex divisions
- Enrollment: 230 (Girls); 250 (Boys) (2021–2022)
- Student to teacher ratio: 4.6:1 (Girls); 5.5:1 (Boys)
- Colors: Yellow and black
- Mascot: Black Panther
- Nickname: YULA
- Accreditation: WASC
- Newspaper: The Panther Post
- Revenue: Boys: US$5,753,381 (▼50.8%); Girls: US$5,043,312 (▼26.7%) (2018)
- Website: yula.org

The Yeshiva University High School of Los Angeles (abbreviated YULA, pronounced /ˈjulə/) is a college-preparatory, Modern Orthodox Jewish high school founded in 1979 by Rabbi Marvin Hier. It has no affiliation with Yeshiva University in New York City.

The school is financially independent of and separately incorporated from the Simon Wiesenthal Center, despite their juxtaposition.

== History ==
YULA was proposed by rabbi Marvin Hier in 1977 along with a center to honor Simon Wiesenthal, shortly before he and his family arrived in Los Angeles. YULA was intended to be an affiliate of Yeshiva University offering secondary and tertiary education, but ultimately, it became solely a high school. As time passed, the Los Angeles Orthodox Jewish community perceived that Hier had placed more attention on developing the Wiesenthal Center, as opposed to the educational center. The school was ultimately founded in 1979.

Yeshiva University of Los Angeles purchased a $2.25-million facility for high school classes, located on Robertson Boulevard, in late May 1990. Hier had outbid Sephardic Jewish and Sikh organizations for the site. Prior to the purchase, Hier had asked for $5 million in additional federal funding for the Wiesenthal Center. In response, there were serious considerations for establishing a new Orthodox Jewish high school in Los Angeles, and some parents at YULA had threatened to remove their children.

== Campuses ==
YULA has separate campuses for boys and girls within the Pico-Robertson area of Los Angeles. The campus of the boys' school has 15 classrooms as well as a Beit Midrash and a Sephardic Beit Midrash which served as locations for davening and assemblies before the COVID-19 pandemic. The campus of the girls' school also has 15 classrooms, as well as two science labs.

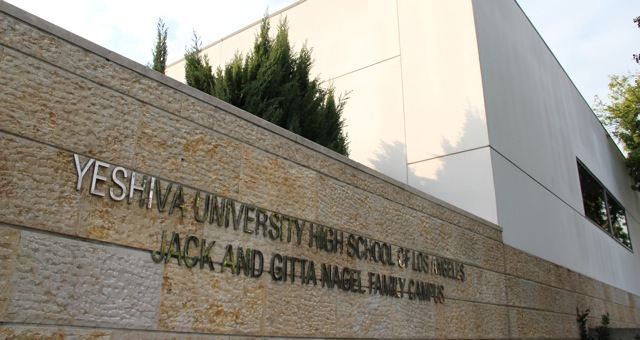
YULA Boys School Campus

== Academics ==
The YULA curriculum is split into general (secular) studies and Judaic studies components, providing both separate and cumulative GPAs for coursework completed. In 2018, YULA offered 13 Advanced Placement classes.

== Composition ==
Each school has a student body of approximately two hundred students from different areas of Los Angeles. Many students live in the Pico-Robertson and Beverlywood neighborhoods, and in the San Fernando Valley. The boys' school has 29 full-time equivalent faculty, while the Girls' School has 36 full-time equivalent faculty.

== Student life ==
=== Project Reclaim ===
In 2026, the school introduced Project Reclaim, a voluntary program in which students removed social-media applications and installed content filters; some participants used the recovered time for additional chavruta Torah study. The first challenge enrolled 220 students.

=== Sports ===
The school assigns teams to compete in basketball (varsity and junior varsity), baseball, fencing, swimming, tennis, volleyball, cross country, flag football, golf, and soccer.

In 1997, the school asked the California Interscholastic Federation (CIF) to move the November cross-country championships to a day other than Saturday; Orthodox Jews would not participate if the competition was held on a Saturday. The initial request was denied, but the school said they planned to file an appeal.

In 2009, the boys' basketball team forfeited two games against the Oakwood Gorillas in the CIF Liberty League, because the opposing team had drafted a 17-year-old girl– the all-boys team would violate religious practices by playing organized sports with a girl after their bar mitzvah. Rather than press the issue, as the other team was determined to uphold their Title IX right to maintain women members of the team, YULA chose to forfeit the two upcoming games against Oakwood. YULA asked the league to reconsider the forfeitures after an upset win placed them in contention for the playoffs, and shrink their season from 20 games to 18, but the request was denied.

=== Newspaper ===
YULA circulates editions of its newspaper, The Panther Post, a few times per year. It reports on the student community, academics, and politics. In March 2021, the paper was recognized by the Columbia Scholastic Press Association.

=== Controversies ===
In 2024, YULA guidance counselor Julie Elizabeth Tichon, 37, was arrested for allegedly having sexual relations with a 16 year old student.

== Notable alumni ==
- Ben Shapiro, American political commentator, columnist, author, radio talk show host, and attorney
- Noam T. Wasserman, American dean, professor, and academic
- Rabbi Shlomo Einhorn, Founder & CEO of Mallacore

== See also ==
- History of the Jews in Los Angeles
