= Lincoln Square Synagogue =

Modern Orthodox synagogue in New York City

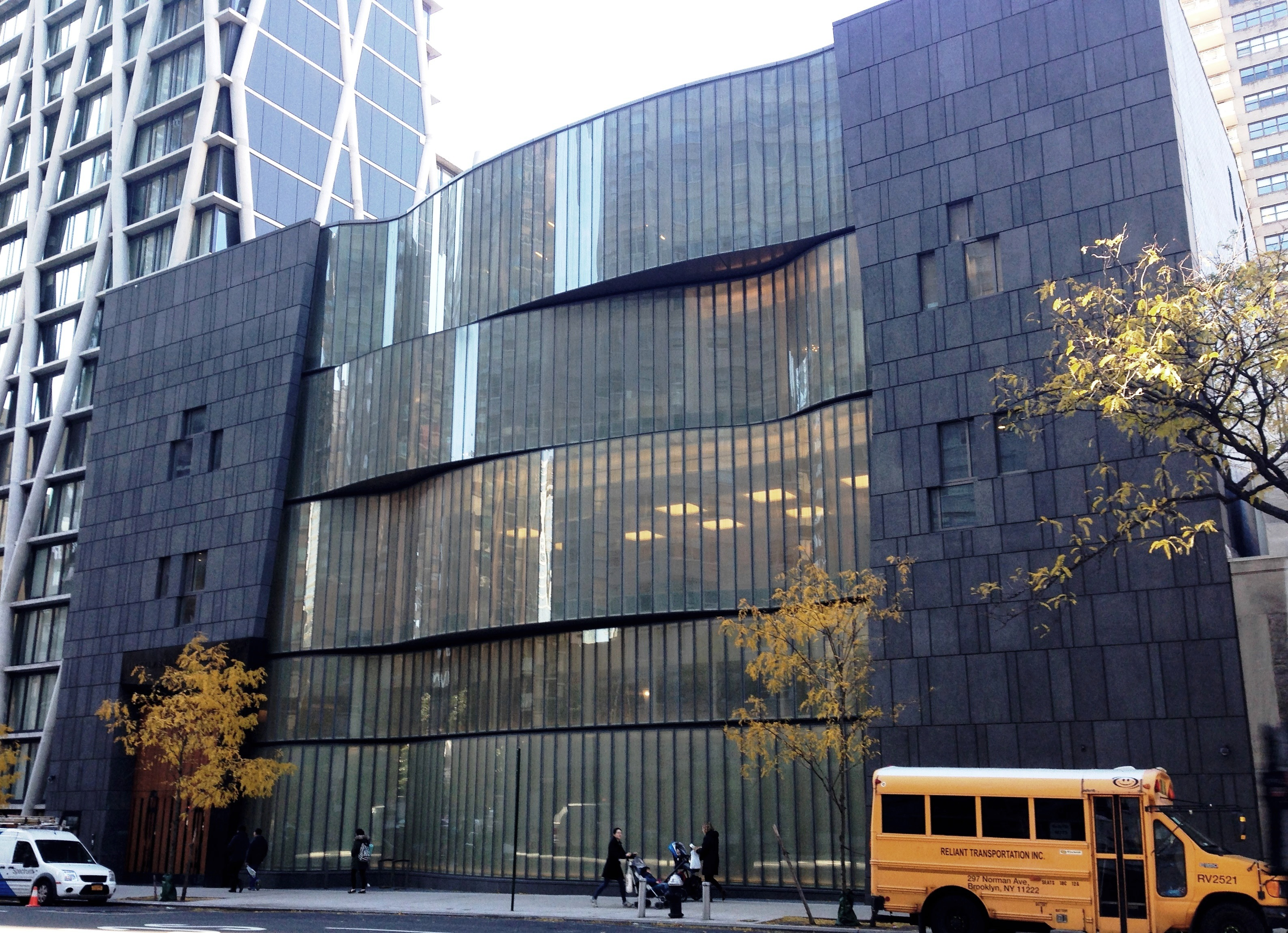
- Lincoln Square Synagogue, in 2016

- Location in Manhattan

Religion
- Affiliation: Modern Orthodox Judaism
- Ecclesiastical or organisational status: Synagogue
- Ownership: Rabbi Shaul Robinson; Rabbi Daniel Gottesman, Asst Rabbi; Rabbi Efraim Tepler, Asst Rabbi; Chazzan Yanky Lemmer, Cantor
- Status: Active

Location
- Location: 180 Amsterdam Avenue, Lincoln Square, Manhattan, New York City
- Country: United States
- Coordinates: 40°46′37″N 73°59′00″W

Architecture
- Established: 1964 (as a congregation)
- Completed: 1970 (200 Amsterdam Avenue); 2013 (180 Amsterdam Avenue)

Specifications
- Capacity: 429 worshippers
- Interior area: 52,000 square feet (4,800 m^{2})

Website
- lss.org

The Lincoln Square Synagogue is a Modern Orthodox congregation and synagogue located at 180 Amsterdam Avenue between West 68th and 69th Streets in the Lincoln Square neighborhood of Manhattan, New York City.

Founded in 1964, the synagogue has moved several times; the most recent move occurred in January 2013. The 2013 building is the largest synagogue built in New York City in over 50 years. The current senior rabbi is Rabbi Shaul Robinson.

== History ==
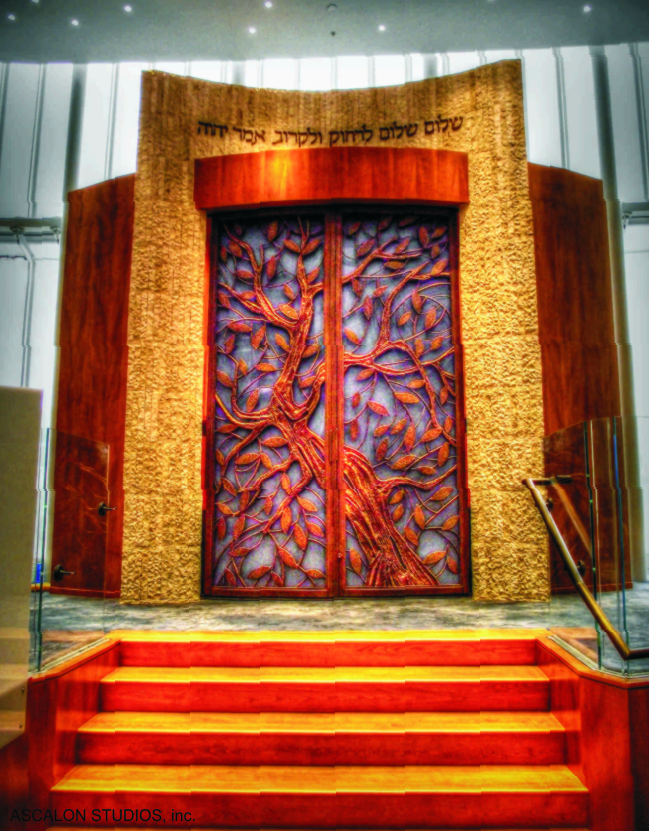
The Torah ark (Aron Kodesh), the aesthetic and spiritual focal-point of Lincoln Square Synagogue's new sanctuary, designed by David Ascalon.

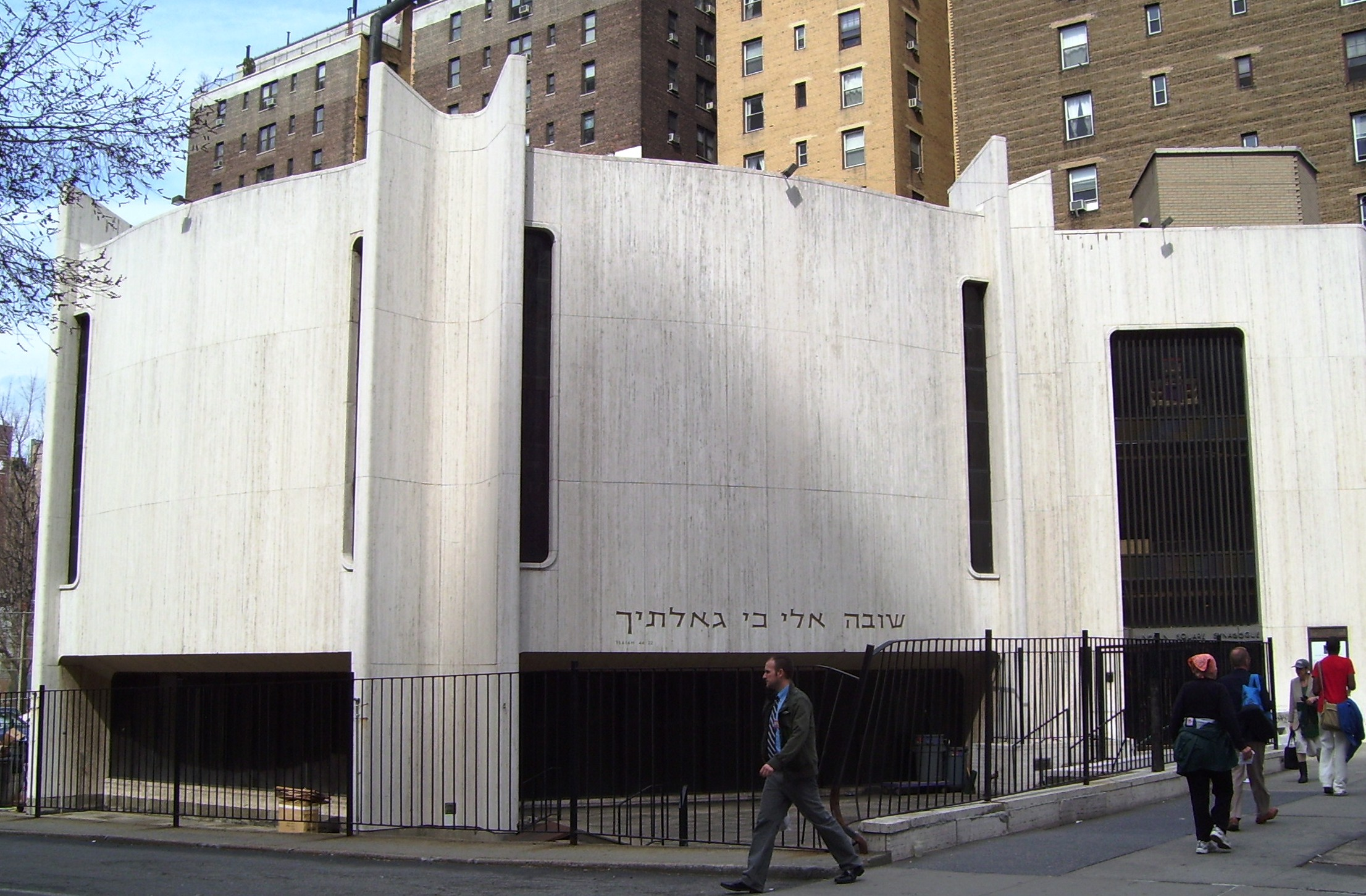
The synagogue's building from 1970 to 2013

The Lincoln Square Synagogue was founded as a congregation in 1964 by Rabbi Shlomo Riskin. In the late 1960s, the first Orthodox Jewish women's tefillah group was created, on the holiday of Simhat Torah at Lincoln Square Synagogue.

The travertine building it formerly occupied at 200 Amsterdam Avenue, just 250 feet (76 m) from its current building, was built in 1970, and was designed by the firm of Hausman & Rosenberg. Because it had outgrown that building, the synagogue moved to a new building designed by Cetra/Ruddy in mid-January 2013, after a development process that lasted seven years. The move was the result of a land swap between the synagogue and the development company American Continental Properties, in which the congregation received $20 million to aid in paying for the construction of the new building. Despite this, and the $10 million raised by the congregation, construction was held up in 2010 because of a lack of funds, which was made up by a single contribution of $20 million from an anonymous donor. The old building is being replaced by a luxury apartment tower called 200 Amsterdam.

The new building, the largest new synagogue in New York City in fifty years, is five stories tall and comprises 52,000 square feet (4,800 m^{2}), including a sanctuary able to hold 429 people. The horseshoe shape of the seating in the sanctuary of the old building was kept, but with changes that help to focus one's attention on the ark.

The building won the 2015 Architectural Lighting award for interior lighting.

== Clergy ==
=== Rabbi Shaul Robinson ===
Rabbi Shaul Robinson is currently the senior rabbi at Lincoln Square Synagogue. Robinson has held the position since September 1, 2005. He is credited with setting up and directing the first ever "Department for Professional Rabbinic Development" in the United Kingdom.

=== Cantor Sherwood Goffin ===
Cantor Sherwood Goffin served the synagogue from its founding in 1965 until he retired in 2015, only acting as Cantor occasionally on Shabbat. Cantor Goffin has been only Principal of the Lincoln Square Synagogue Feldman Hebrew School since 1965. He obtained "Cantor for Life" tenure in 1986. Cantor Goffin worked with Cantor Yaakov Lemmer. Goffin died on April 2, 2019.

== Notable people ==
- Kenneth Brander – assistant rabbi and then acting rabbi from 1990 to 1991, later president and Rosh HaYeshiva of the Ohr Torah Stone network of institutions
- Adam Mintz – Senior rabbi from 1996 to 2004 at LLS, later Founding Rabbi of Kehilat Rayim Ahuvim in New York.
- Shlomo Einhorn – Orthodox rabbi and later Dean of School at Yeshivat Yavneh (Yavneh Hebrew Academy) in Los Angeles, interned at LSS.
- Elena Kagan – future Supreme Court justice had her bat mitzvah at the synagogue. She was the first girl to become bat mitzvah at LSS.
- David Remnick – Pulitzer Prize-winning journalist and author
- Charlie Buttons – Jewish community figure known for his presence at Chabad events in Crown Heights, Brooklyn and regular at 770 Eastern Parkway
- Gidi Grinstein - Current member of the Synagogue and Founder of the Reut Institute in Israel.
