= Orthodox Judaism outreach =

Encourages non-Orthodox Jews to live according to Orthodox Jewish law

Orthodox Jewish outreach, often referred to as Kiruv or Qiruv (Hebrew: קירוב "bringing close"), is the collective work or movement of Orthodox Judaism that reaches out to non-Orthodox or non-observant Jews to encourage belief in God and life according to Jewish law. The process of a Jew becoming more observant of Orthodox Judaism is called teshuva ("return" in Hebrew) making the "returnee" a baal teshuva "returner". Orthodox Jewish outreach has worked to enhance the rise of the baal teshuva movement.

== Varieties ==
=== Hasidic ===
Hasidic outreach is predominantly the area of the Chabad and Breslov Hasidic groups; however, other groups have also been involved in such efforts.

Rabbi Menachem Mendel Schneerson, leader of the Chabad-Lubavitch branch of Hasidic Judaism, encouraged his followers to reach out to other Jews. He sent out rabbinic emissaries, known as "Shluchim", and their wives to settle in places across the world solely for the purpose of teaching those who did not receive a Jewish education or to inspire those who did. The vehicle chosen for this was termed a "Chabad house". Since the 1940s, Chabad has been active in reaching out to Jews through its synagogues and communal institutions, as well as more direct outreach efforts, such as its Mitzvah tanks. The organization has been recognized as using free holiday services to reach out across denominations. Chabad led the first Jewish outreach organization in the United States following the Holocaust, to date it remains the most successful with a world wide presence.

The world's first baal teshuva yeshiva for men was Chabad's Hadar Hatorah which opened in New York in 1962 under Rabbi Yisroel Jacobson, and continues to operate today. In the following decade, Chabad established an outreach yeshiva for women, Machon Chana of Crown Heights (founded 1972). Later, Bais Chana Women International (formerly of Minnesota) was founded as well.

According to Steven I. Weiss, Chabad's ideology has dramatically influenced non-Hasidic Jews' outreach practice. Because of its outreach to all Jews, including those quite alienated from religious Jewish tradition, Chabad has been described as the one Orthodox group which evokes great affection from large segments of American Jewry.

A contemporary example of Chabad outreach in sparsely populated areas is Chabad of Rural and Regional Australia, which coordinates holiday support for Jews in remote parts of Australia. For Rosh Hashanah, the program has sent honey cakes, shofars, and other holiday materials, while also arranging visits by roving rabbis and yeshiva students to isolated Jewish residents.

Breslov Hasidism is also associated with Orthodox outreach and has a strong presence online.

Other Hasidic groups involved in outreach have included the Bostoner Hasidic dynasty. Bostoner Hasidism was associated with an outreach program.

=== Haredi and Modern Orthodox ===
The mid-1960s and early 1970s saw the founding of the non-Hasidic, Haredi institutions, beginning with Diaspora Yeshiva, founded by Rabbi Mordechai Goldstein in Jerusalem in 1965, which subsequently moved to Mount Zion, Jerusalem in 1967 after the Six Day War at the invitation of former State of Israel Director-General of Ministry and Religion Rabbi Dr. S.Z Kahane. Later, Rabbi Noah Weinberg was another pioneer of this movement with Aish HaTorah. Ohr Somayach has also played a major role in the baal teshuva movement through its education of generations of students. Also yeshivas Machon Shlomo and Dvar Yerushalayim, established in 1970. Orthodox yeshivot for women include Neve Yerushalayim, founded in 1970 in Jerusalem, an Orthodox school for secular Jewish women seeking a college-level introductory program. Its founder and guiding dean is Rabbi Dovid Refson. Rebbetzin Tziporah Heller is a teacher at the school for baal teshuva women. Also, EYAHT, College of Jewish Studies for Women, and affiliated with Aish HaTorah was founded in 1982 by Denah Weinberg, wife of Aish HaTorah founder Noah Weinberg.

Within Modern Orthodox Judaism, the Union of Orthodox Congregations created the National Conference of Synagogue Youth (NCSY) to reach Jewish teenagers in public schools. Founded by rabbi Pinchas Stolper, the movement also developed its in-house literature geared to the newly observant, mainly written by rabbi Aryeh Kaplan. In addition, many Modern Orthodox professors have developed and used a sophisticated modern terminology to present Judaism in a scientific manner. Their books on Jewish sciences are the most readily accessible. In 1987, an organization called National Jewish Outreach Program (NJOP) was founded by Ephraim Buchwald.

Esther Jungreis was the founder of the international Hineni movement in America and led the group until her death in 2016.

Concurrent with the opening of baal teshuva learning programs in Israel in the 1970s, a small number of Orthodox outreach workers began approaching English-speaking, college-age students visiting the Western Wall and inviting them to experience a Shabbat meal with a host family or to check out one of the baal teshuva yeshivas. These outreach workers included rabbi Meir Schuster, Baruch Levine, and, beginning in 1982, Jeff Seidel.

In Israel, Haredi outreach groups include Lev Echad, an Israel-based umbrella organization for the Lev outreach network to develop and facilitate innovative Torah educational programs in Israel and abroad.

Umbrella groups have also been formed including the Association for Jewish Outreach Professionals (AJOP) which was established in 1987 to unite and enhance the work of outreach rabbis and their wives.

Several organizations were established along the East Coast of the United States including Project Genesis, a Baltimore-based kiruv effort to increase the numbers of baalei teshuva, a Sephardic-Haredi group known as Kiruv Organization which was founded in 1995 by Yossef Mizrahi in New York, Gateways (organization), and Oorah (organization).

== See also ==
- Baal teshuva
- Conversion to Judaism
- Born again christian
- Jerusalem syndrome
- Jewish fundamentalism
- Jewish outreach
- Off the derech
- Radicalization
- Repentance in Judaism
- Scrupulosity
- Spiritual crisis
