= Noah Weinberg =

American rabbi (1930–2009)

Rabbi Yisrael Noah Weinberg ישראל נח וינברג
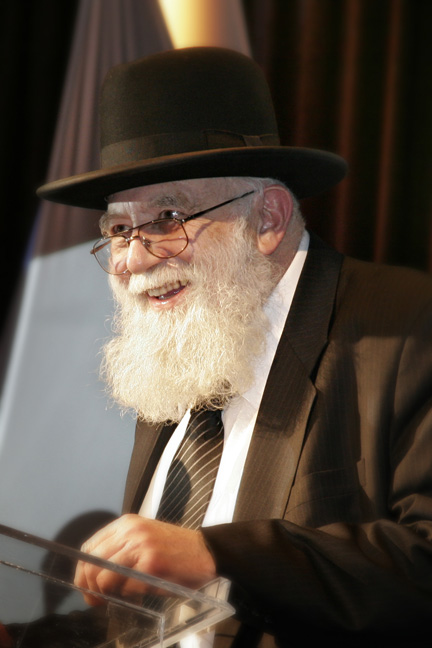

Personal life
- Born: February 16, 1930 Lower East Side, New York City
- Died: February 5, 2009 (aged 78) Jerusalem, Israel
- Buried: Har HaMenuchot; 31°48′00″N 35°11′00″E
- Spouse: Denah Weinberg
- Children: 8 sons, including Hillel Weinberg, and 4 daughters
- Known for: Pioneer in Orthodox Judaism outreach

Religious life
- Religion: Judaism

Jewish leader
- Position: Rosh yeshiva
- Yeshiva: Aish HaTorah
- Ended: 2009

Yisrael Noah Weinberg (Hebrew: ישראל נח וינברג; February 16, 1930 – February 5, 2009) was an Orthodox rabbi and the founder of Aish HaTorah.

== Early life ==
Noah Weinberg was born on the Lower East Side of New York City. His father, Yitzchak Mattisyahu Weinberg was a Slonimer Hasid, and a grandson of Avraham Weinberg (first Slonimer rebbe). Weinberg studied at Yeshiva Rabbi Chaim Berlin in Brooklyn and at Yeshivas Ner Yisroel in Baltimore, where he received his semikhah (rabbinic ordination). He completed his undergraduate studies at Johns Hopkins University and his post-graduate studies at Loyola Graduate School.

== Aish HaTorah ==
In 1966, Weinberg decided to enter the field of kiruv (Orthodox Judaism outreach), and he opened the first yeshiva in this style for Jewish men in Jerusalem. The school was short-lived, as were several other attempts, before he co-founded Yeshivas Shma Yisrael (later renamed Ohr Somayach) in 1970 with Nota Schiller, Mendel Weinbach and Yaakov Rosenberg .

After a few years, Weinberg broke away from the partnership over a difference in educational philosophy. He believed that the times called for the call up of "kiruv soldiers"—people who would be given a few years of basic education training, and then sent out to give introductory classes to other young Jews at risk of assimilation and intermarriage. Weinberg established Aish HaTorah with five students in a small apartment in Jerusalem's Old City in 1974. In addition to its Jerusalem headquarters, Weinberg helped establish an Aish HaTorah branch in St. Louis in 1979. The organization later grew to 30 branches worldwide.

In 1985, Weinberg launched the Discovery Seminar, a multi-day seminar attempting to prove God's existence.

In 2001, Weinberg founded the Hasbara Fellowships program to bring university students to Israel for an intensive two-week Israel activism training course.

== Personal life and death ==
Weinberg married Denah Goldman, and established their first home in the Mea Shearim neighborhood of Jerusalem. In 1967, they moved into a new apartment in the Kiryat Sanz neighborhood. His older brother Yaakov was rosh yeshiva (dean) of Yeshivas Ner Yisroel in Baltimore. His nephew, son of his sister Chava Leah, was Shimshon Dovid Pincus.

Weinberg was diagnosed with lung cancer in 2007. He died on February 5, 2009.

== Works ==
Weinberg created new curricula to teach the fundamentals of Jewish belief and practice to Jews. These include:

- "The 48 Ways to Wisdom"
- "The 6 Constant Mitzvot"
- "Foundations"
- "The 5 Levels of Pleasure"

=== Books ===
- 48 Ways to Wisdom (co-authored with Shraga Simmons and Nechemia Coopersmith; Artscroll, ISBN 1-4226-1862-5)
- What the Angel Taught You: Seven Keys to Life Fulfillment (co-authored with Yaakov Salomon; Artscroll, ISBN 978-1-57819-134-5)
- The 5 Levels of Pleasure: Enlightened Decision Making for Success in Life (SelectBooks, ISBN 1-59079-109-6)
- Wisdom for Living (Nechemia Coopersmith; Artscroll, ISBN 978-1422615782)
