= Denah Weinberg =

Denah Weinberg was an Orthodox Jewish rebbetzin wife of a rabbi) and the founder and dean of EYAHT College of Jewish Studies for Women in Jerusalem. EYAHT has over 2,000 alumni. She was also a speaker on women's issues in Israel and abroad, and published several essays in Jewish women's anthologies. She was married to Noah Weinberg, founder of Yeshivat Aish HaTorah. She died in Jerusalem on March 12, 2023.

== Biography ==
Denah Weinberg was born in Far Rockaway, Queens, New York to Albert and Esther Goldman.

She married Noah Weinberg in New York in February 1958. They lived in Jerusalem, Israel and raised 8 sons and 4 daughters. One of their sons, Rabbi Hillel Weinberg, briefly succeeded his father as rosh yeshiva of Aish HaTorah. Her husband died in 2009.

== Founding EYAHT ==
In 1984, with seed money from Aish HaTorah, she opened the EYAHT college in two ground-floor apartments located across the street from her home. She named the college "EYAHT" (Hebrew: א.י.ה.ת.) by creating an acronym for the phrase, אשה יראת ה' היא תתהלל, Eesha Yirat Adonoy Hee Tithallal, "A woman who fears God, she shall be praised" (Proverbs 31:30).

Shortly after inaugurating a five-story, 15,400-square-foot (1,430 m^{2}) campus for EYAHT in the Romema neighborhood in 2014, EYAHT was closed.

== Death ==
She died on March 12, 2023.
