= Yitzchak Hutner =

American rabbi (1906–1980)

Rabbi Yitzchak Hutner יצחק הוטנר
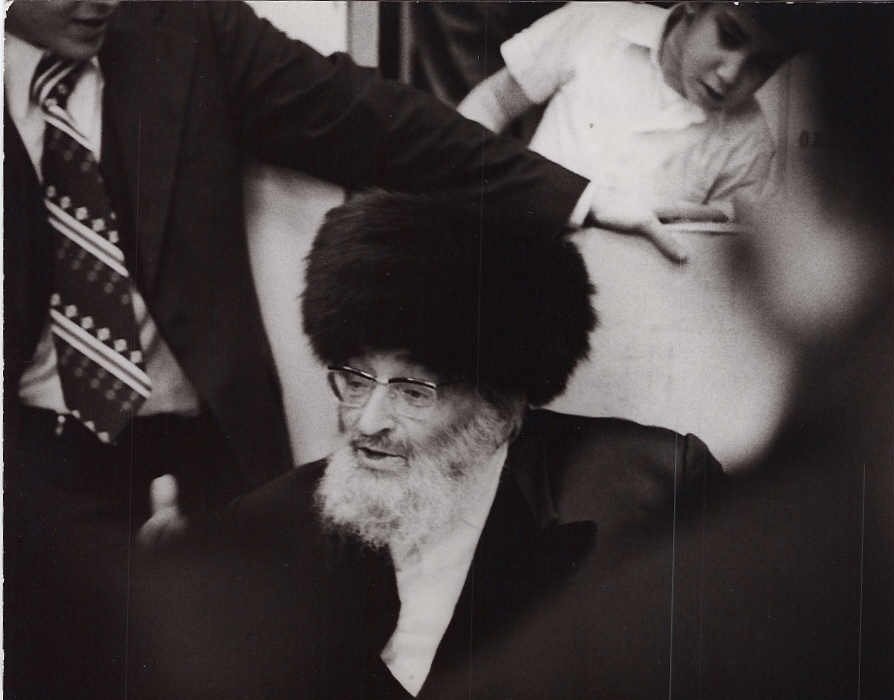
- Yitzchak Hutner at a Purim celebration in his yeshiva

Personal life
- Born: 1906 Warsaw, Congress Poland, Russian Empire (now Poland)
- Died: November 28, 1980 (aged 74) Jerusalem

Religious life
- Religion: Judaism

Jewish leader
- Position: Rosh yeshiva
- Yeshiva: Yeshiva Rabbi Chaim Berlin

Yitzchak Hutner (Hebrew: יצחק הוטנר; 1906 – November 28, 1980), also known as Isaac Hutner, was an American Orthodox rabbi and rosh yeshiva (dean).

Originally from Warsaw, Hutner was the long-time dean of Yeshiva Rabbi Chaim Berlin in Brooklyn, New York, an older institution that grew under his leadership. Hutner's pedagogic style was a blend of the Hasidic and Misnagdic elements of his own family's origins. His discourses, called ma'amarim, contained elements of a Talmudic discourse, a Hasidic Tish and a philosophic lecture. Although his title was rosh yeshiva, Hutner's leadership style more closely resembled that of a rebbe who expected fealty from his followers.

In his later years, Hutner established Yeshiva Pachad Yitzchok in Jerusalem, which is named after his own magnum opus. On one of his trips there, Hutner's plane was seized by Popular Front for the Liberation of Palestine terrorists in the Dawson's Field hijackings, which he survived.

== Early life ==
Hutner was born in Warsaw, Poland, to a family with both Ger Hasidic and non-Hasidic Lithuanian Jewish roots. As a child he received private instruction in Torah and Talmud. As a teenager he was enrolled in the Slabodka yeshiva in Lithuania, headed by Nosson Tzvi Finkel, where he was known as the "Warsaw Illui" (Genius of Warsaw). His younger sister was Rachela Hutner (1909–2008).

In 1925, having obtained a solid grounding in Talmud, Hutner joined a group from the Slabodka yeshiva that established the Hebron Yeshiva in Mandatory Palestine. He studied there until 1929, narrowly escaping the 1929 Hebron massacre because he was away for the weekend. Hutner then returned to Warsaw to visit his parents. He then moved to Germany, to study philosophy at the University of Berlin, where he befriended Joseph B. Soloveitchik and Menachem Mendel Schneerson, two future rabbinical leaders then studying in Berlin. In 1932, he authored a book called Torat HaNazir.

In 1933, Hutner married Masha Lipshitz in Kobryn. She was born in Slutsk and raised in the United States. That same year, the couple traveled to Mandatory Palestine, where they remained for about a year, and completed his research and writing of his Kovetz Ha'aros on Hillel ben Eliakim's commentary on midrash sifra.

== Rabbinic and teaching career ==
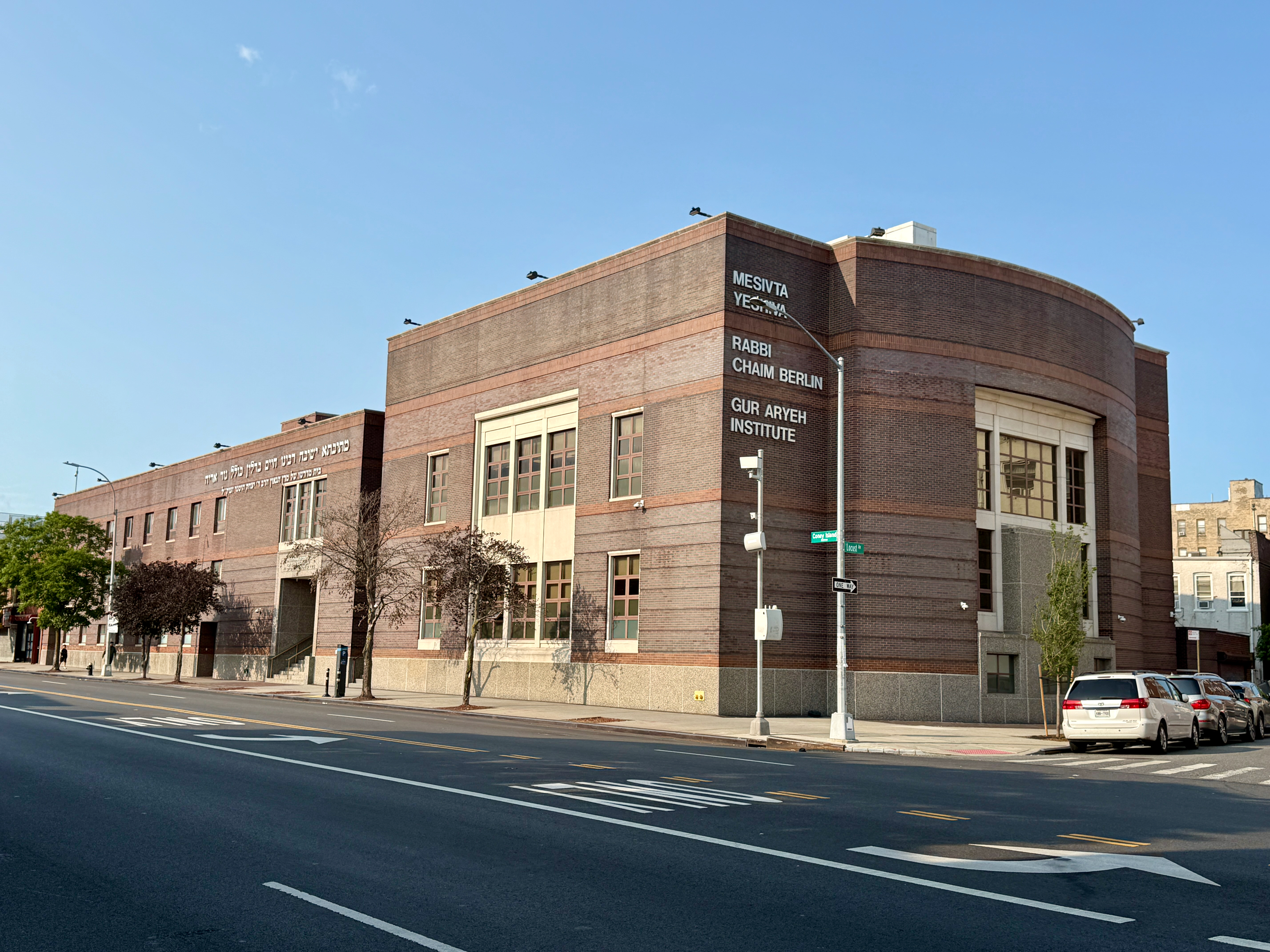
New building of Yeshiva Rabbi Chaim Berlin. The building was constructed after Hutner's death.

In March 1934 Hutner moved to the United States (his wife having preceded him by six months) and settled in Brooklyn, where Hutner joined the faculty of the Rabbi Jacob Joseph School. Sometime between 1935 and 1936 he was appointed office manager of the newly established high school division of the Yeshiva Rabbi Chaim Berlin known as Mesivta Yeshiva Rabbi Chaim Berlin.

In 1940, after receiving permission from the rosh yeshiva, Yaakov Moshe Shurkin, he began to give a class to the 4th year of the post high school program. Founded in 1904, it was the oldest elementary yeshiva in Brooklyn. Over the years he built up the yeshiva's post-high school beth midrash division and became Yeshiva Rabbi Chaim Berlin's senior rosh yeshiva (dean). In this effort he also received the help of Shraga Feivel Mendlowitz who headed Brooklyn's Yeshiva Torah Vodaas. Hutner was able to construct an environment that produced young Talmudic scholars in the model of their compatriots in Eastern Europe. By 1940 he had established a post-high-school beth midrash with hundreds of students.

At Chaim Berlin, students were allowed to combine their yeshiva study with afternoon and evening classes at college, mainly Brooklyn College and later Touro College. Hutner took great pride in the secular accomplishments of his students insofar as they fit into his vision of a material world governed by the principles of a spiritual Torah way of life. Thus, many alumni of Hutner's yeshiva have attained success as attorneys, accountants, doctors, and in information technology. One of his closest disciples, Israel Kirzner, is an economist who edited Hutner's written works, Pachad Yitzchok. Many of Hutner's disciples earned doctorates, often with his blessing and guidance. This includes his daughter and only child, Bruria David, who obtained her PhD at Columbia University's department of philosophy as a student of Salo Baron. She subsequently founded and became the dean of Beth Jacob Jerusalem, a prominent Jewish women's seminary that caters to young women from Haredi families in the United States. Her dissertation discussed the dual role Zvi Hirsch Chajes as both a traditionalist and maskil (follower of the enlightenment). The list also includes Ahron Soloveichik (law) rosh yeshiva, Aharon Lichtenstein (literature) rosh yeshiva, Yitzhak Aharon Korff (law, international law and diplomacy), and Yehuda (Leo) Levi (physics) professor and rector.

In the 1950s, Hutner established a kollel (post graduate division for married scholars) to continue their in-depth Talmudical studies. This school, Kollel Gur Aryeh, was one of the first of its kind in America. Many of his students became prominent educational, outreach, and pulpit rabbis. He stayed in touch with them and was involved in major communal policy decision-making as he worked through his network of students in positions of leadership.

Hutner established Yeshiva Pachad Yitzchok in Har Nof, Jerusalem, which he named for his book of the same name. He died in 1980, and was buried in the Mount of Olives Jewish Cemetery in East Jerusalem.

=== Methodology ===
Hutner's methodology and style was complex, controversial, and difficult to pigeonhole. While placing great emphasis on intellectually penetrating Talmudic study and analysis, emotionally he veered towards the Hasidic-style, and more-so than his Lithuanian-style colleagues reared as Misnagdim could tolerate. Ultimately though, he saw himself more as a traditional Litvish rosh yeshiva.

The core of Hutner's synthesis of different schools of Jewish thought was rooted in his studies of the teachings of Judah Loew ben Bezalel (1525–1609) a scholar and mystic known as the Maharal of Prague. Various pillars of Hutner's thought system were likely the works of the Vilna Gaon and Moshe Chaim Luzzatto. He would only allude in the most general ways to other great mekubalim (mystics) such as the Baal Shem Tov, the Ari, Shneur Zalman of Liadi, Mordechai Yosef Leiner of Izbitz and many other great Hasidic masters, as he did with the works of Kabbalah such as the Zohar.

Hutner initiated a number of changes in Yeshiva Rabbi Chaim Berlin that differed greatly from the mussar (ethics) yeshiva practice in Slabodka. He abolished the half-hour learning session in mussar and replaced it with one of ten or fifteen minutes.

Hutner viewed secular studies as essential for attending college, learning a profession and becoming self-supporting. He obtained, together with Shraga Feivel Mendlowitz, a charter from the New York State Board of Regents to set up a combined yeshiva and college. However, this plan was dropped at the insistence of Aharon Kotler.

Hutner developed a style of celebrating Shabbat and the Jewish holidays by delivering a type of discourse known as a ma'amar. It was a combination of Talmudic discourse, Hasidic celebration (tish), philosophic lecture, group singing, and when possible, like on Purim, a ten-piece band was brought in as accompaniment. Many times there was singing and dancing all night. All of this, together with the respect to his authority that he demanded, induced in his students an obedience and something of a "heightened consciousness" that passed into their lives transforming them into literal Hasidim of their rosh yeshiva, who in turn encouraged this by eventually personally donning Hasidic garb (levush) and behaving like something of a synthesis between a rosh yeshiva and a rebbe. He also instructed some of his students to do likewise.

== Relationships with other rabbis ==
During his stay in Palestine, Hutner visited Abraham Isaac Kook, the first chief rabbi of Palestine, to whom he was distantly related. Hutner eventually became a member of the non-Zionist Haredi Moetzes Gedolei HaTorah (Council of Torah Sages) of Agudath Israel of America following his immigration to the United States.

Hutner's work Pachad Yitzchok contains no overt reference to Kook. A few of Hutner's early students recall Hutner's lengthy comments regarding Kook. Eliezer Waldman said that Hutner told them that "Rav Kook was 20 times as great as those who opposed him". Similarly, Moshe Zvi Neria heard Hutner say that "if I would not have met Rav Kook, I would be lacking 50% of myself".

While staying in Berlin, Hutner developed a friendship with Menachem Mendel Schneerson and Joseph B. Soloveitchik. Hutner referred to Soloveitchik as a gadol (foremost Torah scholar of the time) and to Schneerson as tzadik hador (righteous one of the generation), while at other times saying some negative things about the latter. Nevertheless, the three maintained close personal relations throughout their lives, though each differed markedly in Torah hashkafa (weltanschauung), developing a unique bridge and synthesis between the Eastern European world-view and a Western European way of thinking. This enabled them to serve successfully as spiritual leaders after each of them immigrated to the United States of America.

Citing an anonymous source, Hillel Goldberg reports that Hutner became a fierce critic of the Chabad-Lubavitch Hasidic group and the "personality cult built up around" Schneerson. Hutner purposefully moved up his Hanukkah ma'amar to preempt his students from attending Schneerson's Yud Tes Kislev farbrengen. Still, Hutner corresponded regularly with Schneerson throughout his lifetime on a variety of halakhic (Jewish law), Hasidic and kabbalistic subjects, and occasionally sought his blessing. Hutner also had several lengthy private meetings with Schneerson.

Hutner appointed Soloveitchik's younger brother, whom he had tutored in Warsaw, Ahron Soloveichik (later to head his own yeshiva in Skokie near Chicago, Illinois), as head of his own Yeshiva Rabbi Chaim Berlin. Ahron Soloveichik completed a Doctorate in law at New York University at the same time that he lectured in Hutner's Yeshiva Rabbi Chaim Berlin.

In the early 1940s, Hutner asked a friend from Slabodka, Saul Lieberman, to become a dean-Talmudical lecturer in Yeshiva Rabbi Chaim Berlin. Lieberman instead accepted an offer from the Jewish Theological Seminary of America (JTSA), the seminary of Conservative Judaism.

Hutner had a number of disagreements with some of the religious scholars who taught in his yeshiva. These disputes were usually not over ideology, but about positions in the school. He eased out many of the older rabbis who were his contemporaries in favor of his disciples. Rabbis Prusskin (a first cousin to his wife), Goldstone, Shurkin, Snow, Avrohom Asher Zimmerman and others are among them. Though Hutner was, by all accounts, quite steadfast in his opinions, he was not above begging forgiveness from those he had slighted, even when they had initiated attacks on him, and adopting a conciliatory tone.

Hutner appointed Slabodka yeshiva educated Avigdor Miller as the mashgiach ruchani (spiritual mentor and supervisor) of the yeshiva. After the yeshiva relocated to Far Rockaway, New York in the 1960s, Miller resigned from his position due to the difficulties a daily commute from Brooklyn entailed.

== TWA hijacking ==
In the late 1960s he began to visit Israel again, planning to build a new yeshiva there. On 6 September 1970, he and his wife, daughter, and son-in-law Yonasan David were returning to New York on TWA Flight 741 when their flight was hijacked by the PFLP Palestinian terrorist organization. The terrorists freed the non-Jewish passengers and held the Jewish passengers hostage on the plane for one week, after which the women and children were released and sent to Cyprus. The hijacked airplanes were subsequently detonated. The remaining 40-plus Jewish men – including Hutner, David, and two students accompanying Hutner, Meir Fund and Yaakov Drillman – and male flight crew continued to be held hostage in and around Amman, Jordan; Hutner was held alone in an isolated location while Jews around the world prayed for his safe release. The terrorists tried to cut off his beard, but were stopped by their commanders. Hutner was reunited with the rest of the hostages on 18 September, and was finally released on 26 September and flown together with his family members to Nicosia, Cyprus. Israeli Knesset Member Menachem Porush chartered a private plane to meet the Hutners in Nicosia, and Willie Frommer, a former student, gave him his own shirt and tallit katan, since Hutner's tallit, tefillin, shirt, jacket and hat had been confiscated during his three-week ordeal. On 28 September Hutner and his group were flown back to New York via Europe, and were home just in time for the first night of Rosh Hashana.

== Published work ==
In 1938 Hutner published a short booklet of halakhic decisions sourced in the Sifra but not cited in the Babylonian Talmud. Many years later, he published what is considered to be his magnum opus, which he named Pachad Yitzchok ("Fear [of] Isaac", meaning the God whom Isaac [had] feared). He called his outlook Hilchot Deot Vechovot Halevavot ("Laws [of] 'Ideas' and 'Duties [of the] Heart'") and wrote in a poetic modern-style Hebrew reminiscent of his original mentor Abraham Isaac Kook's style, even though almost all of Hutner's original lectures were delivered in Yiddish. Rabbi Hutner’s attitude toward Zionism and the secular State of Israel became increasingly hostile over the years as evidenced from a 1977 article he published in The Jewish Observer in which he blamed the Zionist movement for unintentionally instigating the Nazi's Final solution.

== Notable students ==
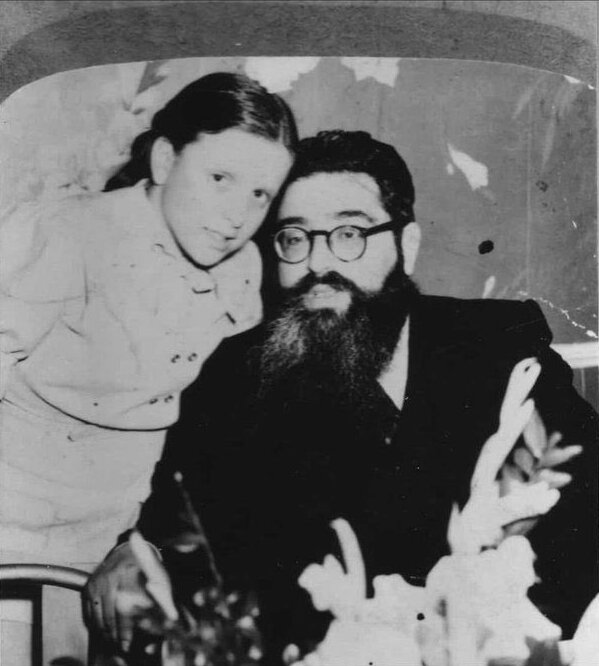
Rabbi Yitzchok Hutner with his daughter Rebbetzin Bruria David

Among Hutner's notable students are first and foremost his only daughter Rebbetzin Dr. Bruria David (1938–2023) the founder of the Beth Jacob Jerusalem seminary for young Jewish women in Israel. Rabbis Yisroel Eliyah Weintraub, and Feivel Cohen, a noted Posek. Another was the author Shlomo Carlebach, who was appointed as the mashgiach ruchani at the Yeshiva Chaim Berlin, but who split with Hutner on policy matters in the 1970s. They were both Holocaust survivors whom Hutner took upon himself to raise as his own "sons" together with others in similar circumstances. Hutner also gave semikhah to Shlomo Carlebach, the musician, during the days that the latter was still with Lubavitch.

Other students included rabbis Yonasan David (his son-in-law) and Aharon Schechter, his successors as rosh yeshivas of Yeshiva Rabbi Chaim Berlin; Aharon Lichtenstein, son-in-law of Joseph B. Soloveitchik and rosh yeshiva of Yeshivat Har Etzion in Israel; Pinchas Stolper of the Orthodox Union and founder of NCSY who followed Hutner's guidelines in setting up this youth outreach movement; Yaakov Feitman, prominent rabbi, past President of the Young Israel Council of Rabbis and disseminator of Hutner's views; Shlomo Freifeld who set up one of the first full-time yeshivas for baal teshuva students in the world; Joshua Fishman, past leader and executive Vice President of Torah Umesorah the National Society for Hebrew Day Schools; Yaakov Perlow, the Novominsker Rebbe of Boro Park; Yitzhak Aharon Korff, the Zvhil-Mezbuz Rebbe of Boston and Jerusalem, and Noah Weinberg founder and head of Aish Hatorah as well as his brother Yaakov Weinberg of Ner Israel Yeshiva in Baltimore.

== Works ==
=== Works about Hutner ===
- An Inner Life: Perspectives On The Legacy of Harav Yitzchok Hutner zt"l by Rebbitzen Bruriah David, translated by Rabbi Shmuel Kirzner (Gur Aryeh Institute For Advanced Jewish Scholarship, 2024)
- Dershowitz Family Saga: A Century and a Half of Jewish Life in Poland, Through America, and Into Israel by Zecharia Dor-Shav (Dershowitz) (Skyhorse Publishing, 2022, ISBN 1510770232)
- Rabbi Hutner and Rebbe, by Chaim Dalfin (Jewish Enrichment Press, 2019, ISBN 0997909935)
- Between Berlin and Slobodka: Jewish Transitional Figures from Eastern Europe by Hillel Goldberg (KTAV Publishing House, 2010, ISBN 1602801355)
- "ORTHODOX THEOLOGY IN THE AGE OF MEANING: THE LIFE AND WORKS OF RABBI ISSAC HUTNER" by Alon Shalev (Hebrew Phd Thesis)

=== Works based upon Hutner's writings ===
- Pachad Yitzchok: Selected Ma'Amarim of Rabbi Yitzchok Hutner on Shabbos and the Yamim Tovim, adapted by Eliakim Willner (Artscroll Mesorah Publications, 2024, ISBN 9781422640715)
- Shabbos in a New Light: Majesty, Mystery, Meaning: Rabbi Yitzchak Hutner Sefer Pachad Yitzchak by Pinchas Stolper (David Dov Foundation, 2009, ISBN 1600910661)
- Chanukah in a New Light: Grandeur, Heroism and Depth as Revealed Through the Writings of Rabbi Yitzchak Hutner ZTZK"L by Pinchas Stolper (Israel Bookshop, 2005, ISBN 1931681767)
- Purim in a New Light: Mystery, Grandeur, and Depth as Revealed Through the Writings of Rabbi Yitzchak Hutner by Pinchas Stolper (David Dov Publications, 2003, ISBN 1931681309)
- Living Beyond Time: The Mystery and Meaning of the Jewish Festivals: Includes 20 Essays Based on the Teachings of Hagaon Harav Yitzchok Hutner ZTZ"L by Pinchas Stolper (Shaar Press, 2003, ISBN 1578197449)
