= Adam Milstein =

Israeli-American investor and philanthropist (born 1952)

- אדם מילשטיין
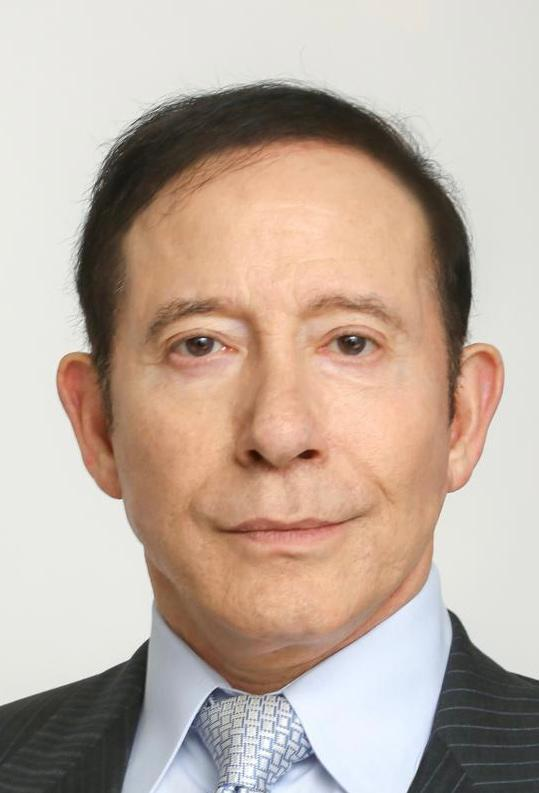
- Born: 1952 (age 73–74); Haifa, Israel
- Education: Technion (BSc); USC (MBA)
- Occupation: Real estate investor
- Title: Chairman of the Israeli-American Council; Managing Partner of Hager Pacific Properties
- Spouse: Gila Milstein
- Children: 3
- Military career
- Allegiance: Israel
- Branch: Israel Defense Forces
- Service years: 1971–1974
- Conflicts: Yom Kippur War

Adam Milstein (Hebrew: אדם מילשטיין; born 1952) is an Israeli and American pro-Israel donor and the chairman of the Israeli-American Council. He is also a real estate investor at Hager Pacific Properties.

He founded and funded organizations supporting Jewish causes, and organizations advocating support for Israel, including countering anti-Israel initiatives such as Boycott, Divestment and Sanctions. He and his wife, Gila, founded the Adam and Gila Milstein Family Foundation in 2000. He is a co-founder of the Israeli-American Council and served as its chairman from 2015 to 2019.

== Early life and education ==
Milstein was born in Haifa, Israel, the eldest child of Eva (née Temkin), a homemaker, and Hillel Milstein, a real estate developer. He served in the Israeli army during the Yom Kippur War with Ariel Sharon's brigade.

Milstein has a Bachelor of Science degree from the Technion in 1978 and a Master of Business Administration in 1983 from the USC Marshall School of Business. He moved with his wife and children to the United States in 1981.

== Investment career ==
Milstein is a managing partner of Hager Pacific Properties, a commercial real estate firm that specializes in acquiring, rehabilitating, and repositioning industrial, retail, office, and multi-family properties.

== Donations ==
Milstein and his wife, Gila, founded the Milstein Family Foundation in 2000, making philanthropic donations of as much as a million dollars per year to Jewish causes. He has published pieces, including in The Times of Israel, about his approach to what he calls "active philanthropy", in which he both contributes to organizations and works to help them achieve their goals.

Milstein co-founded the Israeli American Council in 2007 and was named chairman of the group in 2015. He sits on the boards of StandWithUs and Hasbara Fellowships. He previously served on the boards of Israel on Campus Coalition, Jewish Funders Network, and the American Israel Public Affairs Committee (AIPAC) National Council. He joined Sheldon Adelson and Haim Saban in June 2015 to organize the inaugural Campus Maccabees summit, which opposes Boycott, Divestment and Sanctions (BDS) groups and activities on college campuses in the United States. He strongly opposes the BDS movement, and has had several opinion pieces published on the subject.

Milstein donated $1,000 to the Jewish student group UCLA Hillel in 2014 earmarked to help finance the campaigns of pro-Israel student government candidates. Despite the UCLA election code not requiring the disclosure of campaign finance sources, controversy over the donation resulted in a delay of the confirmation of one student regent-designate.

In 2016, Milstein and his wife started The Impact Forum, an initiative which "fights antisemitism, strengthens the state of Israel, and protects American democracy".

== Personal life ==
Milstein pled guilty to tax evasion involving his donations to the Spinka Hasidic sect in 2009 and served three months in prison, was required to do 600 hours of community service, and paid a $30,000 fine.

The Jerusalem Post selected him for its list of the 50 most influential Jews in the world in 2016. In Gil Troy's book, The Zionist Ideas: Visions for the Jewish Homeland—Then, Now, Tomorrow (2018), he identified Milstein as a contemporary leader of cultural Zionism for his vision to "invigorate Zionism and Jewish identity" worldwide.

He withdrew from speaking at the 2019 AIPAC conference after he posted tweets connecting Ilhan Omar and Rashida Tlaib to the Muslim Brotherhood. Milstein said his views as expressed on Twitter had been "mischaracterized."

He lives in Encino, California, with his wife. They have three daughters and three grandchildren.
