= Pachad Yitzchok =

Pachad Yitzchok (or Pachad Yitschak) may refer to:

- Hebrew of "Fear of Isaac", a Biblical reference in Genesis 31:42 (an allusion to God)
- The writings or person of Rabbi Yitzchok Hutner (1906–1980)
- The writings or person of Rabbi Yitzchok Friedman (1850–1917), First Rebbe of Boyan
- The Talmudic responsa of Rabbi Yitzhok Mordechai Tzadok Marszalkowicz (circa 1780-circa 1840) son-in-law of Rabbi Akiva Eiger (born Gunsz) (1761-1837) responsa prepared for publication by his son Rabbi Shmuel Marszalkowicz eventually published 1998 by Rabbi Samuel Udwin (died 2024 Jerusalem)
- Yeshiva Pachad Yitzchok
- A rabbinic encyclopedia authored by Isaac Lampronti (1679-1756)
