= Baruch Taub =

Canadian rabbi

Rabbi Baruch Taub

Personal life
- Born: Baruch Taub
- Spouse: Judy Blustein; Malkah
- Children: Shimon; Moshe; Naomi; Shmuel; Gitty
- Education: Yeshivas Ner Yisroel; Loyola College of Maryland; Maimonides College of Ontario; Yeshivas Rabbeinu Chaim Berlin

Religious life
- Religion: Judaism

Jewish leader
- Successor: Rabbi Daniel Korobkin
- Synagogue: Beth Avraham Yoseph of Toronto Congregation
- Position: Founding rabbi and rabbi emeritus
- Began: 1980
- Ended: 2010
- Other: National Director of NCSY (1976–1980)
- Residence: Netanya, Israel
- Semikhah: Yeshivas Ner Yisroel

Baruch Alter HaCohen Taub (Hebrew: ברוך אלתר הכהן טאוב) is the founding rabbi and Rabbi Emeritus of the Beth Avraham Yoseph of Toronto Congregation (BAYT), the largest Orthodox congregation in Canada. He also served as the de facto chief rabbi of Vaughan, Ontario, and is the former National Director of NCSY. He currently lives in Netanya, Israel.

== Biography ==
Rabbi Taub received his rabbinic ordination from Yeshivas Ner Yisroel of Baltimore, MD. He holds a master's degree from Loyola College of Maryland and a Doctorate of Philosophy from the Maimonides College of Ontario.

He became National Director of NCSY in 1976, following the departure of Rabbi Pinchas Stolper to become Executive Vice President of the Orthodox Union. He served in this post until 1980, when he left to become the spiritual leader of the BAYT Congregation.

His selection as founding rabbi of the BAYT Congregation came about through his introduction to Canadian philanthropist Joseph Tannenbaum by Rabbi Nota Schiller of Yeshivat Ohr Somayach. Tannenbaum was interested in starting a synagogue in northern Toronto, and Schiller introduced him to the dynamic Ner Yisroel graduate then living in New York with his wife and five children. Rabbi Taub started the BAYT Congregation in his living room with 13 families in 1980, and continued shepherding it as the sole rabbi. By the time of his retirement in 2010, the congregation had grown to 600 to 700 families, making it the largest Orthodox congregation in Canada.

Rabbi Taub is a noted speaker on Orthodox Jewish outreach and the teshuva movement. He delivered the keynote speech to the 1996 AJOP Convention on the subject "The Teshuvah Movement: The next generation". During his tenure as Rabbi of BAYT, he spoke at Israel solidarity rallies and led his congregation on annual solidarity missions to Israel. He led the 11th Siyum HaShas at Yeshivas Chachmei Lublin in Lublin, Poland.

== Personal ==
Rabbi Taub's first wife, Judy Blustein, died in October 2001. A guidance centre was dedicated in her memory in the Beit El Israeli settlement in the West Bank – BAYT's twin city – in November 2002.

Rabbi Taub and his second wife, Malkah, made aliyah to Netanya, Israel, in December 2010.

His son Moshe was the rabbi of Young Israel of Greater Buffalo since September 2003 and is the supervising rabbi of the Vaad Hakashrut (Kosher-Supervising Board) of Buffalo, New York, as well as the rabbinic editor & weekly contributor for Ami Magazine. He is now the Rabbi of Young Israel of Holliswood. Another son, Shimon, is a Torah scholar and author of The Laws of Tzedakah and Maaser: A comprehensive guide, published by ArtScroll.

== Selected bibliography ==
- Shabbaton Manual. National Conference of Synagogue Youth. 1977.
- Preface to Kaplan, Aryeh. The Aryeh Kaplan Anthology: Illuminating expositions on Jewish thought and practice by a revered teacher. Mesorah Publications Ltd., 1991, pp. 15–16. ISBN 0-89906-866-9.
- "Parashat Balak" in Torah insights: Divrei Torah on the Parshiot Hashavua by leading rabbis and teachers, Bertram Leff and Yisrael Epstein, eds. Union of Orthodox Jewish Congregations of America, 2000, pp. 245–246. ISBN 1-57819-542-X.
- Gedola HaTeshuva (Hebrew)
- And The Dove Found Rest: Essays on the weekly Torah Portion Volume 1, 2017
- And The Dove Found Rest: Essays on the weekly Torah Portion Volume 2, 2018
- Kanfei Yona: Essays on the weekly Torah Portion (Hebrew), 2021.
