= BJJ (disambiguation) =

BJJ may refer to:

- Brazilian jiu-jitsu, a sport and martial art
- Beth Jacob Jerusalem, a seminary (religious training college)
- Kannauji language of Uttar Pradesh, India (ISO code: bjj)
- Wayne County Airport (Ohio), United States
