= Beth Avraham Yoseph of Toronto =

Synagogue in Thornhill, Ontario, Canada

- Hebrew: ק״ק בית אברהם יוסף
- BAYT logo

- Location in Toronto

Religion
- Affiliation: Modern Orthodox Judaism
- Ecclesiastical or organizational status: Synagogue
- Leadership: Rabbi Daniel Korobkin
- Status: Active

Location
- Location: 613 Clark Avenue West, Thornhill, Toronto, Ontario
- Interactive map of Beth Avraham Yoseph of Toronto
- Coordinates: 43°48′13.16″N 79°26′38.22″W

Architecture
- Type: Synagogue
- Established: 1981

Website
- www.bayt.ca

Beth Avraham Yoseph of Toronto (Hebrew: ק״ק בית אברהם יוסף), also known as the BAYT, is a Modern Orthodox synagogue in the Toronto suburb of Thornhill, Ontario, and is one of the largest Orthodox synagogues in North America. The synagogue attracts Jews from a variety of religious backgrounds with what it calls the "warmth of Torah tradition". It also serves as a social hall for many social events in the Toronto Jewish community.

== History ==
The idea of BAYT was conceived by Joseph Tanenbaum, who had performed philanthropy elsewhere and wanted to do something for his home town. He set out to create an Orthodox synagogue that acted as the spiritual centre of the community, and which would attract observant Jews and others searching for meaning in their lives.

Tanenbaum approached Rabbi Baruch Taub, a prominent alumnus of Yeshivas Ner Yisroel in Baltimore, who grew up in Toronto, then national director of NCSY in New York, to be the rabbi. By the mid 1980s, the community had reached over 200 families, and has now grown to over 800. The synagogue's former chazzan, Rabbi Manny Klein, developed the first youth programs. The synagogue's current building was dedicated in 1988.

At the end of August 2006, the Bayt hired an assistant rabbi, Rabbi Chaim Y. Ackerman, an alumnus of Yeshivas Chofetz Chaim in Queens, New York, to spearhead new, innovative projects for the synagogue's youth and young families. In mid-August 2009 Rabbi Ackerman took another position as a pulpit rabbi in Columbus, Ohio. Currently, Rabbi Shmuel Lesher is the assistant rabbi. Currently the Youth Directors are Rabbi Josh and Laura Stein

In October 2007, the synagogue became the home of a newly founded kollel, named Kollel Ohr Yosef, named after Tannenbaum.

In January 2010, Rabbi Taub announced his plans for retirement to Israel. In January 2011, Rabbi Taub was given the honorary designation Rabbi Emeritus by the synagogue's board, and he left to Israel as scheduled. Rabbi Asher Vale functioned as the interim Rabbi, until August 20, 2011 when Rabbi Daniel Korobkin assumed his post.
