= David Milstein (advisor) =

American assistant to the US ambassador to Israel

- דייויד מילשטיין

Special Assistant to the U.S. Ambassador to Israel
- Incumbent
- Assumed office April 2025

Personal details
- Born: 1989 or 1990 (age 36–37)
- Relations: Julie Strauss Levin (mother); Mark Levin (stepfather)

David Milstein (Hebrew: דייויד מילשטיין) is an American serving as special assistant to the U.S. ambassador to Israel Mike Huckabee since April 2025.

== Career ==
Milstein previously worked as a legislative aide for U.S. senator Ted Cruz from 2013 to 2018. He later moved to Israel to study at a Yeshiva in Jerusalem. In 2020, he began to serve as an assistant to then-U.S. Ambassador to Israel David M. Friedman during the first Trump administration.

=== Second Trump administration ===
Milstein has been described as a "pro-Israel enforcer" within the Trump Administration, and was a major opponent of ousted press officer for Israeli-Palestinian affairs Shahed Ghoreishi. He has also advocated for the State Department to refer to the West Bank as Judea and Samaria, the biblical name for the region widely used by Israel. Milstein holds a top-secret security clearance.

In July 2025, Milstein and U.S. Ambassador to Israel Mike Huckabee agreed to meet with Jonathan J. Pollard, an American formerly imprisoned for spying for Israel. Milstein and Huckabee met Pollard at the U.S. Embassy in Jerusalem.

In September 2025, Milstein was listed by The Jerusalem Post as 12th on the 25 ViZionaries list.

On September 8, 2026, Milstein advocated for the publication of a memo attributed to Secretary of State Marco Rubio that condemned the UK, French, and Canadian governments for sanctions blocking imports from the occupied West Bank, writing, "These tactics unacceptably draw from the playbook of the antisemitic boycotts, divestments and sanctions movement." The memo was ultimately not released following opposition from the White House and senior State Department leadership.

==== 2026 New York Times investigation ====
On October 8, 2026, The New York Times published an investigation into Milstein, writing he had "repeatedly suppressed or significantly revised embassy reporting on Israeli activities to present the Netanyahu government in a favorable light," including embassy reporting on settler violence in the West Bank, and reporting on Americans killed in the West Bank by Israeli security forces and settlers. The article reported Milstein had rewritten diplomatic cables to remove mentions of a mass casualty event of Palestinians killed near Gaza Humanitarian Foundation food distribution sites in summer 2025.

On October 8, 2026, the Council on American-Islamic Relations (CAIR) published a statement calling for Milstein's firing.

Following the report, on October 9, 2026 Senator Chris Van Hollen wrote a letter to Senate Foreign Relations Committee Chairman Senator Jim Risch demanding a hearing on Huckabee and Milstein, writing, "Amb. Huckabee and David Milstein have become apologists for the most extreme Israeli government in history, even when the Israeli government actions undermined the Trump Administration’s own stated priorities."

Ambassador Mike Huckabee issued a statement condemning The New York Times's report, writing that its reporting amounted to a "hit piece" on Milstein, adding, "I personally and comprehensively deny the elements of your fabricated 'story' and I'm surprised you expect to be taken seriously with such nonsense without even one source willing to be identified by name". In an October 13, 2026 opinion piece in The Jerusalem Post, American Orthodox rabbi Steven Burg wrote that "Milstein deserves our support", criticizing The New York Time's usage of anonymous sources.

== Personal life ==
Milstein is the son of Julie Strauss Levin, a lawyer serving as general counsel at America First Legal, a law firm co-founded by Trump advisor Stephen Miller. He is the stepson of conservative media personality Mark Levin, a close friend of Donald Trump.

In June 2019, Milstein announced his engagement to Miriam Feiglin.

=== Wedding donations ===
On September 21, 2026, Politico published an investigation into Milstein, reporting he had solicited cash gifts from Israeli citizens to celebrate his wedding. On September 16, 2026, Milstein sent a Paperless Post wedding invitation "monetary wedding gift[s]" in either "U.S. dollars or Israeli shekels" along with a QR code. A member of the national intelligence community interviewed by Politico described it as a "walking counterintelligence red flag."

Ambassador Huckabee subsequently defended Milstein in an X post, writing he was a "brilliant policy wonk." Milstein's stepfather Levin wrote in an X post that "David was asked by family members, who live all over the world and throughout the country, about gifts for his upcoming wedding and if he was registered anywhere."

Philip Klein wrote an opinion in the National Review Online describing Politico's article as a "Disgusting Yom Kippur War on David Milstein," writing that "it is customary in Israel for people to give cash wedding gifts, which they view as more practical than, say, purchasing china or a waffle iron for newlyweds."
