= Bruria David =

American rebbetzin (1938–2023)

Rebbetzin Bruria David
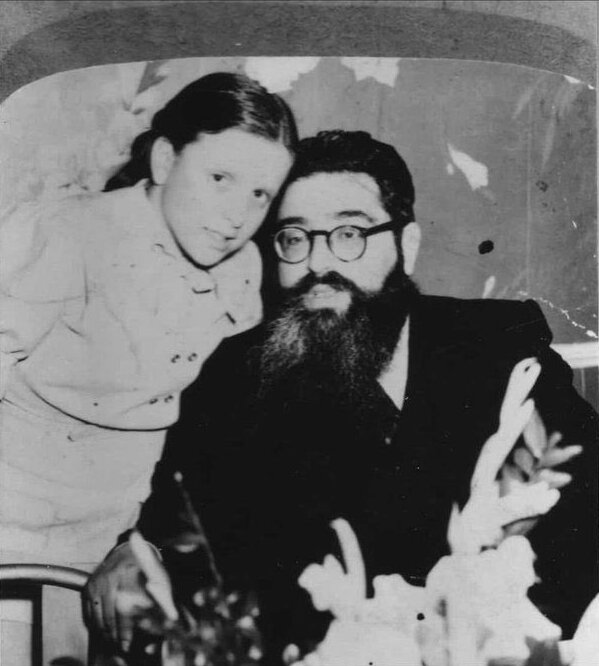
- The young Bruria Hutner (David) with her father Rabbi Yitzchok Hutner
- Born: Bruria Hutner; 1938; New York City, New York, U.S.
- Died: April 9, 2023 (aged 84); Jerusalem, Israel
- Education: Columbia University
- Occupations: Founder and dean, Beth Jacob Jerusalem
- Years active: 1960s–2023
- Spouse: Rabbi Yonasan David
- Parent(s): Rabbi Yitzchok Hutner; Rebbetzin Masha Lipshitz

Rebbetzin Bruria David (Hebrew: ברוריה דייוויד; 1938 – April 9, 2023 (19 Nissan 5783)) was an American-born Israeli Haredi Jewish rebbetzin and Torah scholar. She was the founder and dean of Beth Jacob Jerusalem (commonly known as BJJ), a prestigious Haredi religious girls seminary located in the Unsdorf neighborhood of Jerusalem. She was the only child of Rabbi Yitzchak Hutner (1906–1980), Rosh Yeshiva of Yeshiva Rabbi Chaim Berlin, and the wife of Rabbi Yonasan David, Rosh Yeshiva of Yeshiva Pachad Yitzchok in Jerusalem's Har Nof neighborhood. Together with her husband and parents, she was on one of the airplanes hijacked by the Black September terrorists in 1970.

== Early life and education ==
Bruria David was born in 1938, the daughter of Rabbi Yitzchak Hutner and Masha Lipshitz. Her parents married in 1933 and moved to Mandatory Palestine, but they returned to New York a year later, where Bruria was born.

Rebbetzin David received her doctorate in philosophy from Columbia University in 1971 as a student of Salo Baron. Her dissertation, titled The Dual Role of Rabbi Zvi Hirsch Chajes: Traditionalist and Maskil, deals with Rabbi Chajes's relationships in the traditional world of Orthodox Judaism as well as insights into his worldview and beliefs based on his publications, halachic writings, and personal correspondence.

== BJJ ==
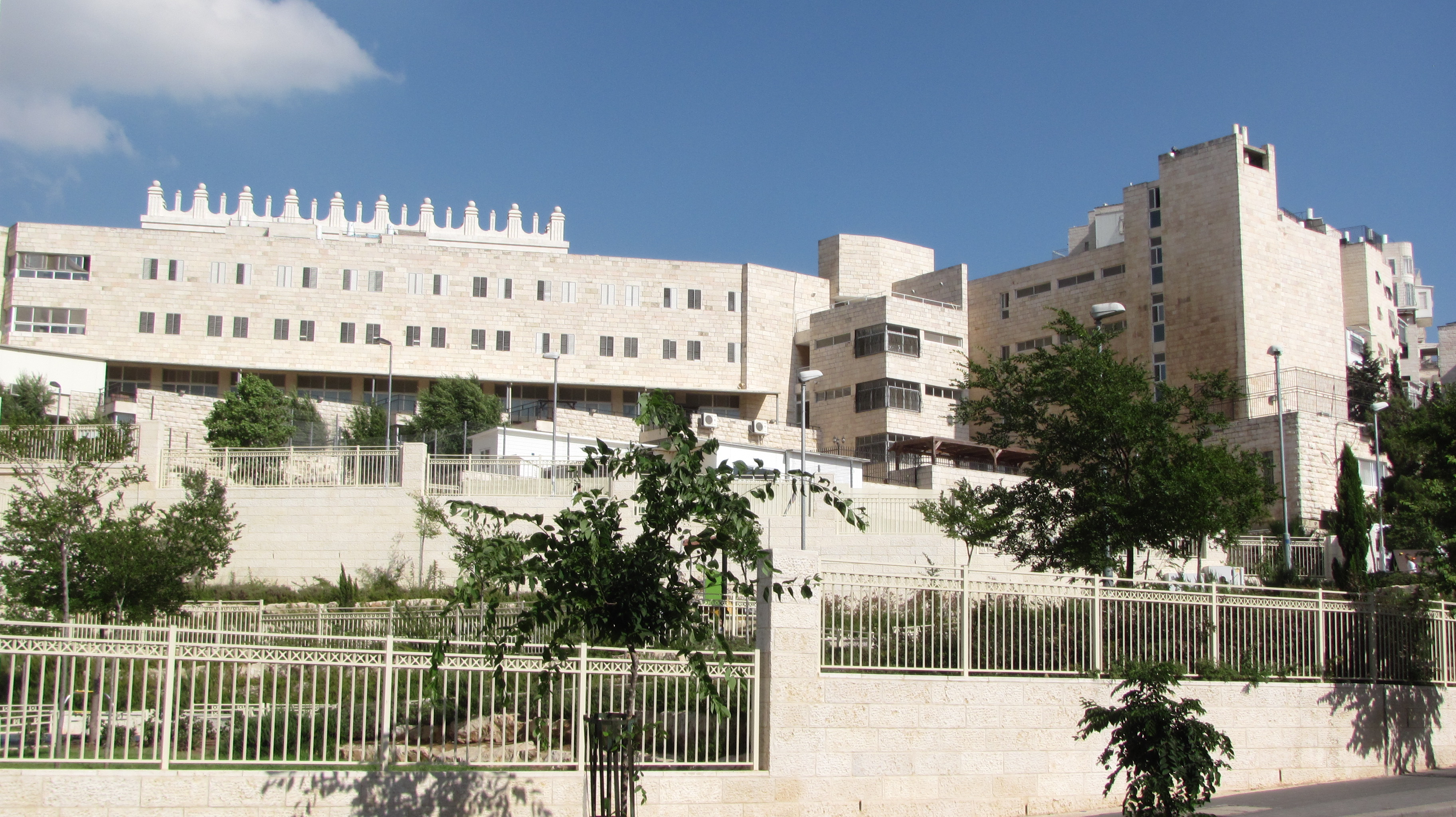
Beth Jacob Jerusalem

Rebbetzin David founded Beth Jacob Jerusalem (BJJ), also known as Machon Sarah Shneirer, in the early 1970s as a post-secondary seminary in Israel, which is geared for American and European graduates of Bais Yaakov who wish to pursue Torah study on an advanced academic level. Previously, she had a seminary at Esther Schonfeld on the East Side and then at Bais Yaakov Academy. The seminary also provides professional training towards a teaching degree. David personally interviewed most applicants, with the exception of those who opted for a written entrance exam instead of an interview.

== Black September hijacking ==
In 1970, Rebbetzin David and her husband accompanied her parents on a trip to Israel. During the return flight to New York on 6 September 1970, their plane was hijacked by the PFLP Palestinian terrorist organization. The terrorists freed the non-Jewish passengers and held the Jewish passengers hostage on the plane for one week, after which the women and children – including David and her mother – were released and sent to Cyprus. The hijacked airplanes were subsequently detonated. The remaining 40-plus Jewish men – including Rabbi Hutner and Rebbetzin David, and two students accompanying Hutner, Rabbi Meir Fund and Rabbi Yaakov Drillman – and male flight crew continued to be held hostage in and around Amman, Jordan; Hutner was held alone in an isolated location while Jews around the world prayed for his safe return. Rabbi Hutner and Rebbetzin David were finally released on 26 September and flown to Nicosia, Cyprus. On 28 September Hutner, David, their wives and students were flown back to New York via Europe, and were home in time for the first night of Rosh Hashana.

== Scholarship ==
Together with her husband, Yonasan David, Bruria edited the works of her father, entitled Pachad Yitzchok ( Isaac's Fear). The couple also compiled and published the official biography of Hutner, entitled Sefer HaZikaron (Book of Remembrance).

== Death ==
Rebbetzin Bruria David died on April 9, 2023, at the age of 84.
