= Sh'or Yoshuv =

Education organization in Lawrence, United States

Coordinates: 40°36′18.3″N 73°44′23.9″W

- Hebrew: שְׁאָר יָשׁוּב

Information
- Religious affiliation: Haredi Judaism
- Established: 1967; 59 years ago
- Founder: Shlomo Freifeld
- Website: www.shoryoshuv.org

Sh'or Yoshuv (Hebrew: שְׁאָר יָשׁוּב) is a Haredi yeshiva in Lawrence, New York. It was founded in 1967 by Rabbi Shlomo Freifeld, former mashgiach ruchani ("dean of students") at Yeshiva Rabbi Chaim Berlin. The yeshiva was located in Far Rockaway from its inception until 2003, when it moved to its current location in Lawrence, New York. The yeshiva facilities include a large Bais Medrash, classrooms, English and Hebrew libraries, a gymnasium, a large hall for community events and dormitory accommodations.

== Student body ==
The yeshiva accepts students from the age of 17 and older. Students enter the yeshiva with a diverse range of backgrounds and educational experience. The student body comes to Sh’or Yoshuv from the surrounding community as well as locations all over the world.

== Academics ==
The yeshiva has both organized shiurim (lectures) and chaburas (peer groups) for the students and for the local community. The students divide their day into the traditional morning, afternoon and night study session (sedarim). A weekly kollel on Sunday is geared towards members of the community.

The yeshiva accommodates for those students who are in college or work in the afternoon.

Sh'or Yoshuv has a semicha (rabbinical ordination) program under Rabbi Eliyahu Schneider. The first "graduates" received their semicha in the 2006-2007 year. The yeshiva also offers a Bachelor of Talmudic Law.
