= Abba Berman =

Talmudist

Rabbi Abba Berman אבא ברמן

Personal life
- Born: Abba Mordechai Berman; Tu BiShvat 1919 Łódź, Poland
- Died: May 12, 2005 (aged 85–86)
- Spouse: Itka Greenberg
- Parent: Shaul Yosef Berman (father)

Religious life
- Religion: Judaism
- Denomination: Haredi Judaism

Jewish leader
- Position: Rosh yeshiva
- Yeshiva: Yeshivas Iyun HaTalmud, Yeshivas Knesses Yitzchok of Chadera-Kiryat Sefer
- Yahrtzeit: 3 Iyar, 5765

Abba Mordechai Berman (Hebrew: אבא מרדכי ברמן; 1919–2005) was a Talmudist and rosh yeshiva (dean of studies) of Yeshivas Iyun HaTalmud.

== Early life ==
Berman was born on Tu BiShvat 5679 (January 14/15, 1919) in Łódź, Poland, to Shaul Yosef Berman, rosh yeshiva of Toras Chesed in Lodz.

Following his bar mitzvah at age thirteen, Berman studied in Yeshivas Mir where he became close to the mashgiach ruchani (dean of students), Yerucham Levovitz. He was a study partner of Nachum Partzovitz.

== World War II ==
Along with most of the student body of the Yeshivas Mir, Berman fled to Shanghai during World War II to escape being murdered by the Nazis in the Holocaust.

== New York City ==
Berman eventually migrated to the United States where he became one of the founding members of the Mir Yeshiva in Brooklyn, where he married Itka Greenberg. Berman established Yeshivas Iyun HaTalmud on Beach 17th Street in Far Rockaway, Queens.

== Land of Israel ==
After several years, Berman emigrated to Israel and re-established Yeshivas Iyun HaTalmud in Bnai Brak. The yeshiva relocated to Jerusalem, then finally to the Israeli settlement of Kiryat Sefer in the West Bank. In his final years he served as rosh yeshiva of Yeshivas Knesses Yitzchok of Chadera-Kiryat Sefer.

== Death ==
He died on May 12, 2005, corresponding to the 3rd of Iyar, 5765. His Talmudic lectures were published posthumously under the title "Iyun HaTalmud" (עיון התלמוד).

Berman and his wife had six daughters.

== Notable students ==
- Chaim Malinowitz (1952 – 2019), rabbi in Ramat Beit Shemesh and editor of the Schottenstein Edition of the Babylonian Talmud
- Yerucham Olshin, rosh yeshiva in Beth Medrash Govoha
- Yisroel Eliyahu Weintraub, kabbalist

== Publications ==
- Shiurei Iyun HaTalmud, on Seder Kodshim
- Shiurei Iyun HaTalmud, on Seder Nashim
- Shiurei Iyun HaTalmud, on Seder Nezikin
- Shiurei Gittin
