= Pinchas Stolper =

American rabbi and writer (1931–2022)

Pinchas Aryeh Stolper (October 22, 1931 – May 25, 2022) was an American Orthodox rabbi and writer, who was a spokesman for Jewish Orthodoxy through his writings and books popularizing Orthodox Judaism.

== Biography ==
Stolper went to Marsha Stern Talmudical Academy in Brooklyn.

Stolper was a disciple of Rabbi Yitzchak Hutner at the Yeshiva Rabbi Chaim Berlin and at its Kollel Gur Aryeh in Brooklyn. He received degrees from Brooklyn College and from the Graduate Faculty of the New School for Social Research. He died at the age of 90 on May 25, 2022 after a prolonged illness.

Stolper attended Yeshivas Chaim Berlin.

Stolper was the first National Director of the National Conference of Synagogue Youth (NCSY) of the Orthodox Union. He subsequently served for close to twenty years as the head of the Orthodox Union as its executive vice-president, retiring from that position in 2003.

== Books ==
- Pesach (NCSY, first published 1962)
- Tested Teen Age Activities NCSY, first published 1964)
- Revelation what Happened on Sinai? (NCSY, first published 1966)
- Jewish Alternatives in Love, Dating and Marriage (NCSY, first published 1967). Renamed: The Sacred Trust: Love, Dating and Marriage: The Jewish View ISBN 0-89906-640-2
- How do I Know it is Kosher (NCSY, first published 1968)
- Real Messiah: A Jewish Response to Missionaries (NCSY, first published 1976)
- Purim in a New Light: Mystery, Grandeur and Depth: Revealed through the writings of Rabbi Yitzchak Hutner (Israel Book Shop, first published 2003) ISBN 1931681309
- Living Beyond Time: The Mystery and Meaning of the Jewish Festivals (Shaar Press/ArtScroll, first published 2003) ISBN 1-57819-744-9
- Chanukah in a New light: Grandeur, Heroism and Depth: As revealed through the writings of Rabbi Yitzchak Hutner (Israel Book Shop, first published 2005) ISBN 1-931681-76-7
- Hidden Lights: Chanukah and the Jewish/Greek Conflict (Israel Book Shop, first published 2005) ISBN 1-931681-77-5
