= Yeshiva Rabbi Chaim Berlin =

Coordinates: 40.62718°N 73.96303°W

Yeshivas Rabbeinu Chaim Berlin
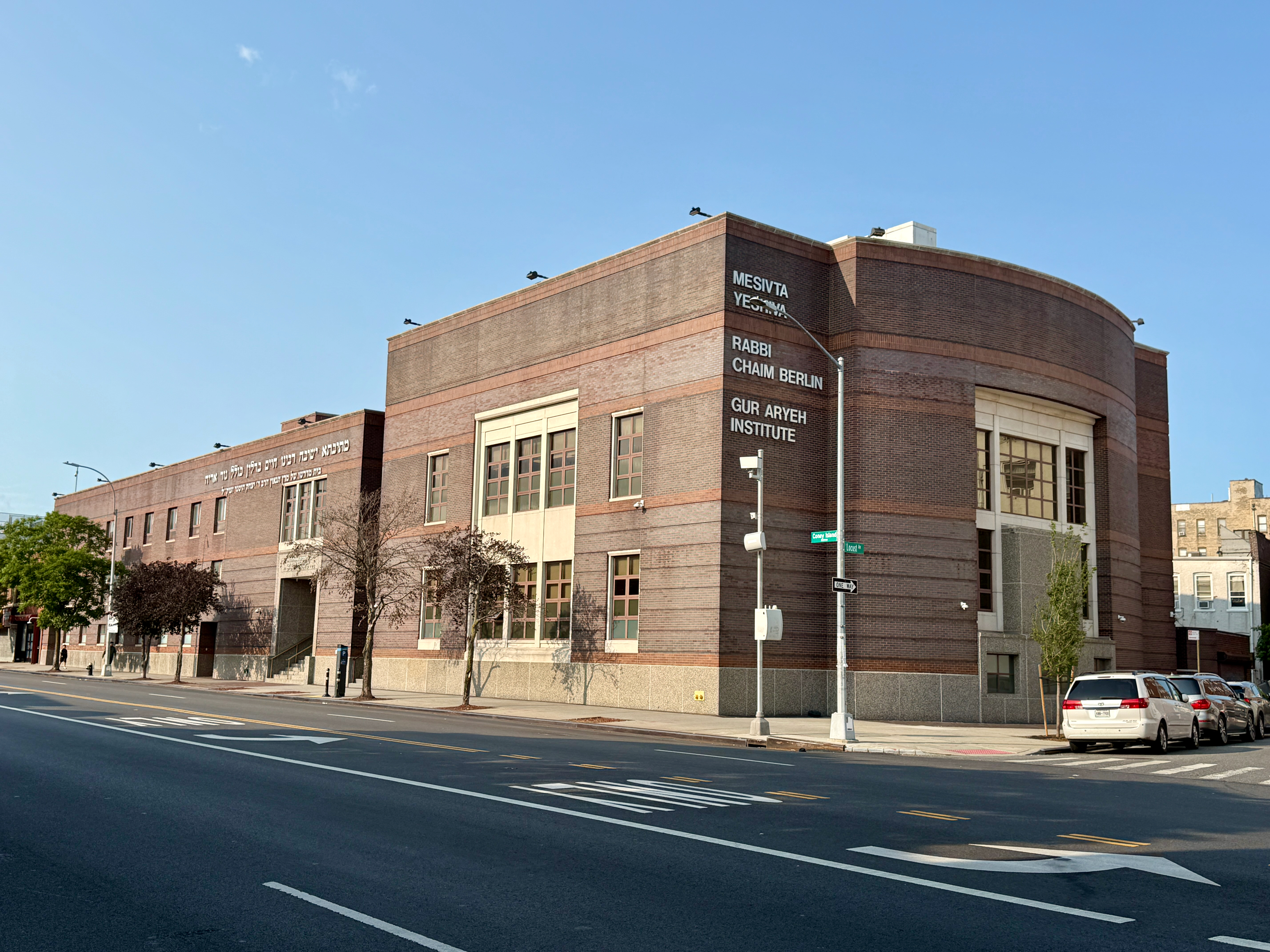
- The yeshiva's main building - housing the beth midrash, kollel, offices and dormitory - on Coney Island Avenue, 2025

Location
- 1605 Coney Island Avenue; Brooklyn, New York; United States

Information
- Type: Yeshiva
- Established: 1904
- Affiliation: Lithuanian-style Haredi
- Rosh yeshiva: Yonasan Dovid David; Yosef Halioua
- Website: rabbinicalacademyrabbichaimberlin

Yeshiva Rabbi Chaim Berlin or Yeshivas Rabbeinu Chaim Berlin (Hebrew: יְשִׁיבַת רַבֵּינוּ חַיִּים בֶּרלִין), officially Mesivta Yeshiva Rabbi Chaim Berlin, is an American Haredi Lithuanian-type boys' and men's yeshiva in Brooklyn, New York. The school's divisions include a preschool, a yeshiva ketana (elementary school), a mesivta (high school), a college-level beth midrash, and Kollel Gur Aryeh, its post-graduate kollel.

== History ==
Yeshiva Rabbi Chaim Berlin was established in 1904 as Yeshiva Tiferes Bachurim in Brownsville, Brooklyn, by Jews who moved there from the Lower East Side of New York City, thus making it the oldest yeshiva in Kings County. At the suggestion of Meir Berlin (Bar-Ilan), it was renamed in 1914 for his brother, Chaim Berlin, Chief Rabbi of Moscow and later Jerusalem, and who had also served in Valozhyn, from where several of the yeshiva's founders came. Through the help of philanthropist Jacob Rutstein, in 1940 the yeshiva purchased the seven-story former Municipal Bank Building at Pitkin and Stone Avenues (now Mother Gaston Boulevard) in Brownsville.

In the late 1970s a branch was opened in Jerusalem called Yeshiva Pachad Yitzchok (Fear of Isaac) "Pachad Yitzchok" being the title of Hutner's books.

After Hutner's death, the New York yeshiva was headed by his disciple Aaron Schechter, and the Jerusalem branch was headed by his son-in-law, Yonason David, who also serves nominally as co-head of the New York branch. When Schechter died in 2023, the leadership of the yeshiva passed to his son-in-law, Shlomo Halioua. Halioua died on 27 October 2024, after leading the yeshiva for only a year and a half.

The position of mashgiach ruchani (spiritual supervisor) has been held by (among others) Rabbis Avigdor Miller, Shlomo Freifeld, and Shlomo Carlebach (1925–2022).

== Divisions ==
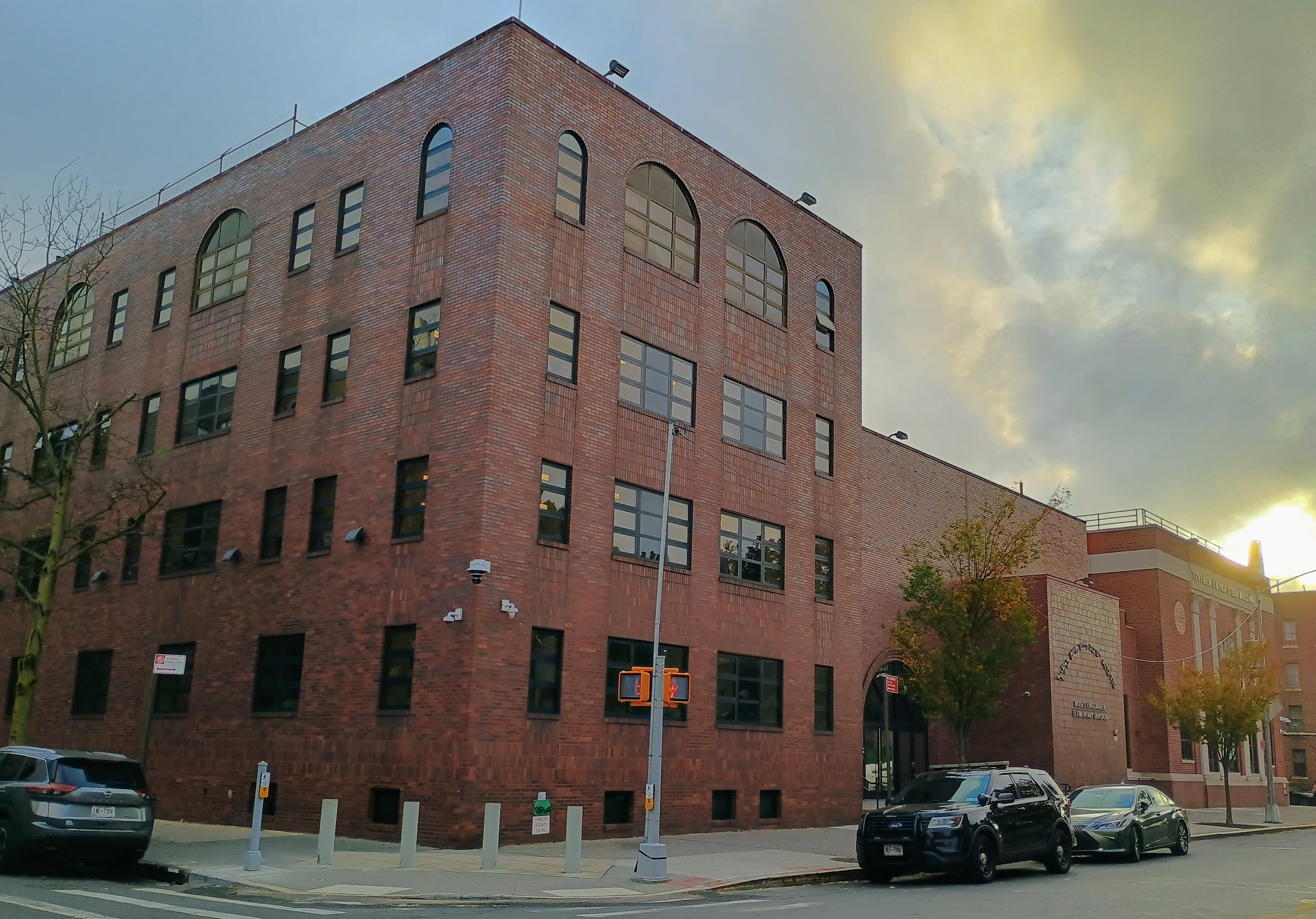
Complete-block elementary school division on Avenue I, 2025

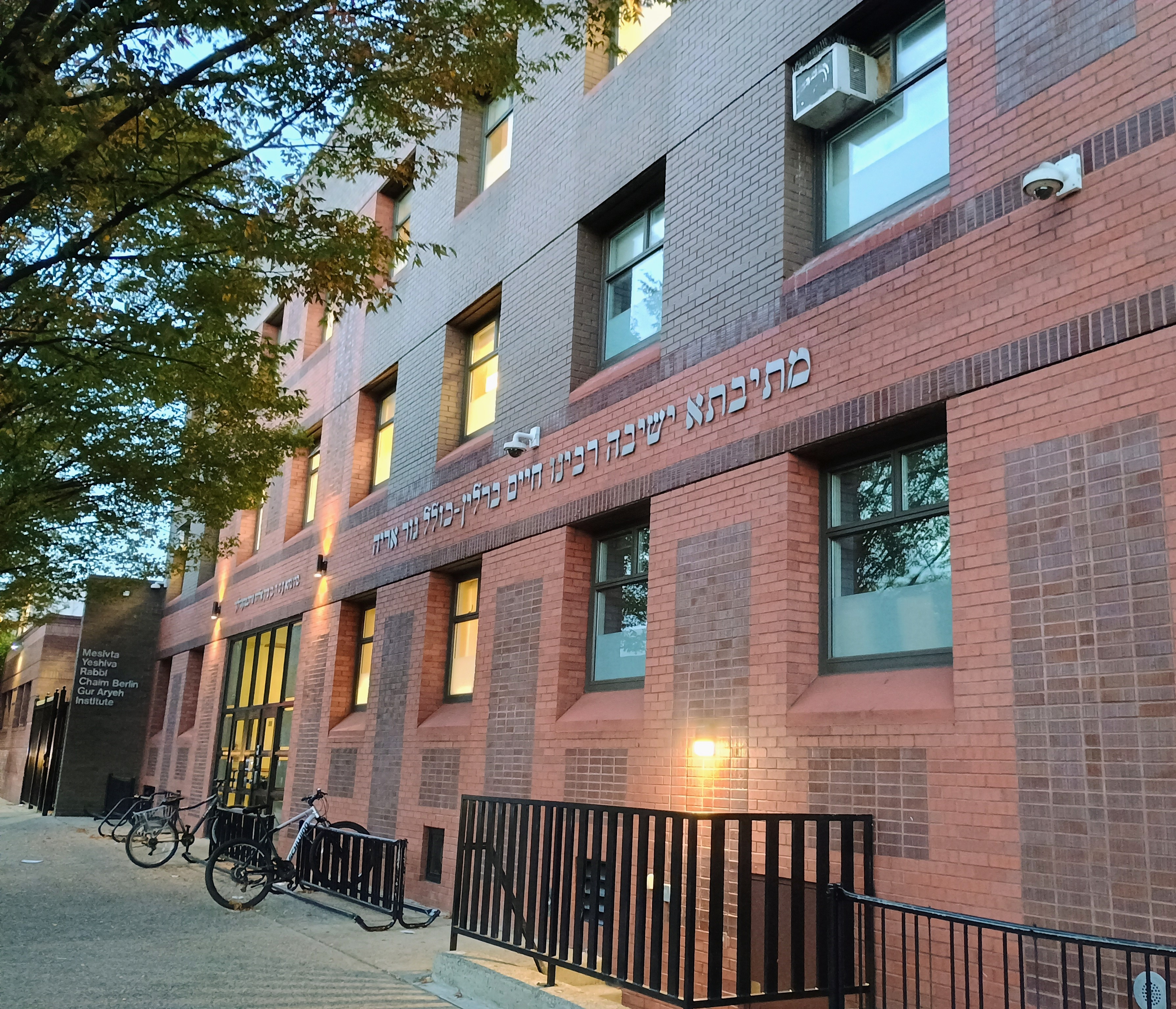
High school division on Coney Island Avenue, 2025

The mesivta acts as a feeder school for the beth midrash. For a time, while located in Far Rockaway, the mesivta was headed by Shlomo Freifeld.

The yeshiva maintains a summer location, Camp Morris, in Sullivan County, New York.

== Notable alumni ==
- Shalom Z. Berger (born 1960), senior content editor of the Koren Talmud Bavli
- Shlomo Carlebach (1925–2022), former mashgiach ruchani of Yeshiva Rabbi Chaim Berlin
- Shlomo Carlebach (1925–1994), rabbi, religious teacher, spiritual leader, composer, and singer
- Yonasan Dovid David, co-rosh yeshiva of Yeshiva Rabbi Chaim Berlin
- Yaakov Feitman (born 1948), rabbi of Kehillas Bais Yehudah Tzvi, Cedarhurst, New York
- Aharon Feldman (born 1932), rosh yeshiva of Ner Israel Rabbinical College
- Shlomo Freifeld (1925–1990), founding rosh yeshiva of Yeshivas Shor Yoshuv
- David Weiss Halivni (1927–2022), rabbi and professor of Talmud
- David Hartman (1931–2013), American-Israeli rabbi and philosopher of contemporary Judaism, founder of the Shalom Hartman Institute
- Yitzhak Aharon Korff (born 1949), Grand Rabbi of Zvhil-Mezbuz, Boston, and the Jerusalem Great Synagogue
- Simcha Krauss (1937–2022), retired rabbi of the Young Israel of Hillcrest, Queens, and leader of the Religious Zionists of America
- David Lefkowitz (1875–1955), chaplain, United States Marines
- Aharon Lichtenstein (1933–2015), rosh yeshiva of Yeshivat Har Etzion, Alon Shevut, and rosh kollel of Yeshiva University's Gruss Kollel, Jerusalem
- Yaakov Perlow (1931–2020), the Novominsker rebbe of Borough Park
- Yechiel Perr (1935–2024), rosh yeshiva of Yeshiva of Far Rockaway
- Zvi Aryeh Rosenfeld (1922–1978), Polish–American rabbi and educator associated with the Breslov Hasidic movement
- Nota Schiller (1937–2025), rosh yeshiva of Ohr Somayach, Jerusalem
- Ahron Soloveichik (1917–2001), taught at Yeshiva University, Hebrew Theological College and Brisk Rabbinical College
- Pinchas Stolper (1931–2022), former executive vice-president of the Orthodox Union and founder of NCSY
- Noah Weinberg (1930–2009), co-founder of Yeshivas Ohr Somayach, Jerusalem; founder of Yeshivas Aish HaTorah
- Yaakov Weinberg (1923–1999), rosh yeshiva of Ner Israel Rabbinical College
- Yisroel Eliyahu Weintraub (1932–2010), rabbi

== See also ==
- Yeshiva Torah Vodaath – another yeshiva in Brooklyn
- RIETS
