= Yisroel Eliyahu Weintraub =

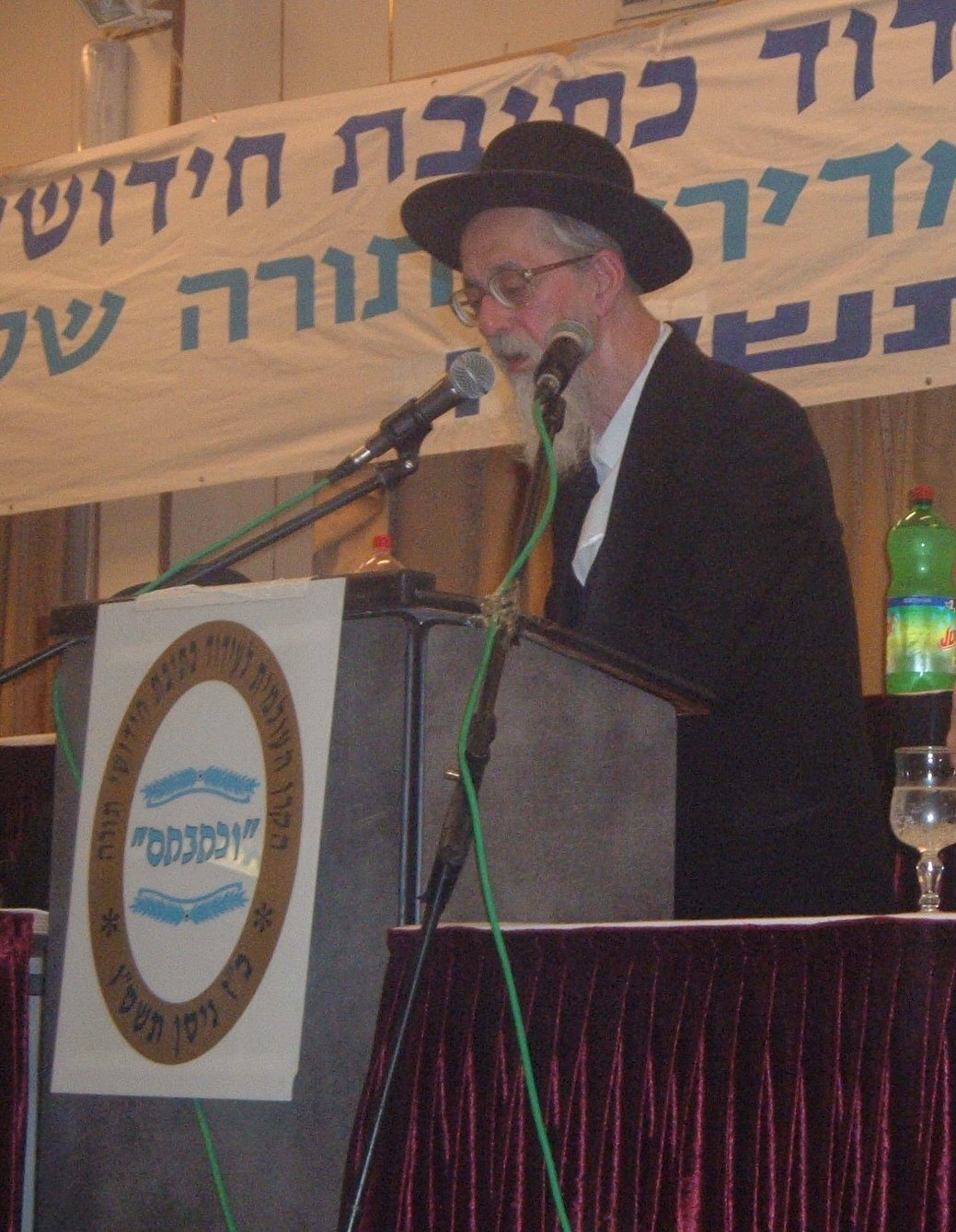
Hebrew: Speaker at the Amali Torah Conference organized and written by an organization

Rabbi Yisrael Eliyahu Weintraub, known as Reb Yisroel Elya Weintraub, (March 25, 1932 – March 30, 2010) was one of the leading Kabbalists of his generation. The leader of the Lithuanian yeshiva world, Rabbi Elazar Menachem Shach, encouraged many people to flock to him for his advice on various matters of life.

== Biography ==
Weintraub was born in the Brownsville neighborhood of Brooklyn. While still a young lad, Weintraub was known for his diligence and devotion to the study of Torah. He attended Yeshiva Rabbi Chaim Berlin where he forged a student relationship with its dean, Rabbi Yitzchak Hutner. As a student of Hutner, Weintraub also developed views on Jewish philosophy, especially following the methodology of Rabbi Judah Loew ben Bezalel (The Maharal). Before attending Yeshiva Rabbi Chaim Berlin he attended the Mir Yeshiva in Brooklyn and studied under Rav Abba Berman and Rav Shmuel Berenbaum. Weintraub briefly served as Mashgiach of Yeshiva Rabbi Chaim Berlin before emigrating to Israel in the early 1960s.

After a brief residence in Jerusalem, Weintraub moved to Bene Barak in 1965. There, he lived on Rashbam street and was a neighbor to Rabbi Chaim Kanievsky. In Bene Barak, Weintraub studied in the Kollel Chazon Ish.

Weintraub also studied Talmud under the guidance of Rabbi Abba Berman. Upon the latter's death, Weintraub recited Kaddish in his memory, a rite usually given to a deceased's son. Rabbi Weintraub eulogized Rabbi Shimshon Dovid Pincus.

== Halachic Opinions ==
In 1967, after the Six-Day War, Weintraub penned – at the behest of Rabbi Shach – a pamphlet to explain to perplexed Jews the spiritual meaning of the Israeli victory. He explained that it was foretold that at the end of the exile, the Erev Rav (including Amalek) will be among the leaders of the Jewish People. Hashem rewards them with great success in order to pay them for their good deeds in this world in order to obliterate them before Moshiach.
