= Yonasan David =

Harebi Rabbi

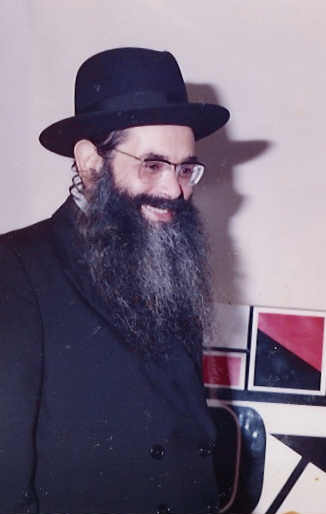
Rabbi Yonasan David during the 1970s.

Yonasan Dovid David (Hebrew: יונתן דייוויד) is a Haredi rabbi and rosh yeshiva (dean) of Yeshiva Pachad Yitzchok and Kollel Ohr Eliyahu in the Har Nof neighborhood of Jerusalem. He also serves as the co-rosh yeshiva of Yeshiva Rabbi Chaim Berlin together with Rabbi Shlomo Halioua (and previously with the Rav Halioua’s father-in-law, Rabbi Aaron Schechter) in Brooklyn, New York.

== Biography ==
David was married to Rebbitzin Bruria David, the only child of Rabbi Yitzchak Hutner, until her death on April 9, 2023. David is often cited as a notable source within the Haredi world's intellectual circles.

Rabbi David became a disciple of Hutner when he enrolled at the Yeshiva Rabbi Chaim Berlin as a teenager. He studied for a while also at the Mir Yeshiva in Jerusalem.

== Black September hijacking ==
In 1970 Rabbi David and his wife accompanied her father and mother on a trip from New York to Israel. During their return flight on September 6, 1970, their plane was hijacked by members of the Popular Front for the Liberation of Palestine. The terrorists freed the non-Jewish passengers and held the Jewish passengers hostage on the plane for one week, after which the women and children – including David and his mother – were released and sent to Cyprus. During a press conference held on the airfield next to the hijacked planes, journalists were invited to interview several hostages, including David. He told the press that "the captives were being treated decently, but that the terrorists were circulating among their captives with biks (the Yiddish word for machine guns) in their hands".

The hijacked airplanes were subsequently detonated, and the remaining 40-plus Jewish men – including Hutner, David, and two students accompanying Hutner, Rabbi Meir Fund and Rabbi Yaakov Drillman – and male flight crew continued to be held hostage, first in a refugee camp and then in safe houses in and around Amman, Jordan. On September 26, Hutner, David, and the students were released and flown to Nicosia, Cyprus. Israeli Knesset Member Rabbi Menachem Porush chartered a private plane to meet them in Nicosia, and reported that the men looked emaciated. On September 28, Hutner, David, their wives and students were flown back to New York via Europe, and were home in time for the first night of Rosh Hashana.

== Works ==
Rav Yonasan and Rebetzin Bruria have edited the works of Rav Hutner, known as Pachad Yitzchok ("Fear of Isaac"). They also compiled and published the official biography of Rav Hutner, known as "Sefer HaZikaron" ("Book of Remembrance"). Rav David edited a subsequent volume of Hutner's "Igros Ukesavim" ("Letters and Writings"). Rav David has also released previously unpublished sermons of Rav Hutner known as Ma'amarei Pachad Yitzchok ("Talks/Teachings of Pachad Yitzchok").
