= Rachela Hutner =

Polish nurse (1909–2008)

- Born: 2 July 1909; Warsaw, Russian Empire
- Died: 23 July 2008 (aged 99); Warsaw, Poland
- Occupations: nurse, nursing administrator
- Years active: 1937–1980

Rachela Hutner (2 July 1909 – 23 July 2008) was a pioneering Polish nurse who was instrumental in the development of the post-World War II nursing profession of her country, pressing for educational requirements and standards. She received numerous awards and honors, including the Knight's Cross and Commander's Cross with the Star of the Order of Polonia Restituta from Poland and the international Florence Nightingale Medal.

== Early life ==
Rachela Hutner was born on 2 July 1909 in Warsaw, which at the time was part of the Russian Empire to the Jewish couple Hannah (née Wajdenfeld) and Joel Chaim Hutner. She was the younger sister of Rabbi Yitzchak Hutner (1906–1980). After her primary schooling, she attended the E. Perła-Łubieńska Gymnasium Polish: gimnazjum E. Perła-Łubieńska), graduating in 1927. Continuing her education, Hutner enrolled in the University of Warsaw to study in the Faculty of Mathematics and Natural Sciences. Before graduating, after three years, she transferred to the Warsaw Nurses' School (Polish: Warszawskiej Szkoły Pielęgniarstwa), from which she graduated in 1937.

== Career ==
Immediately after her graduation, Hutner began working in the surgical department at the School of Hygiene. Winning a scholarship from the government to further her education, she traveled to England in 1938 and enrolled at the Queen's Nursing Institute. Graduating in 1939, the outbreak of war delayed her return home and she remained in England, working for the Willesden District Nursing Association. She was one of the nurses who assisted the wounded during the bombing of London in 1940. In 1944, she attended additional courses at the Southend-on-Sea Hospital in Essex and upon completion of her studies went to work at the St James' Hospital in London. Hutner remained active there until she attained a scholarship to attend studies in the United States in 1947. She traveled to Detroit, Michigan and attended Wayne State University in 1947 and 1948, graduating from the School of Pedagogy.

In 1948, Hutner returned to Warsaw and began her career at the Ministry of Health, recognizing the nursing shortage caused by the war and inadequate training facilities. She pressed for the organization of the Training Center for Nursing Instructors which opened in 1949 and for which she served as director. Simultaneously, she proposed a center for nurses and candidates to improve their proficiency, though it would not be established until 1961. Hutner was one of the co-founders of the Polish Nursing Association, which was established in 1958. In 1960, after receiving a fellowship from the Rockefeller Foundation, Hutner went on a tour of the Nordic countries to evaluate nursing practices, standards and educational facilities. Returning from abroad, she opened the nurses' training school, which would be renamed in 1962 as the Central Medical Personnel Development Center (Polish: Centralny Ośrodek Doskonalenia Średnich Kadr Medycznych). She would direct this organization until her retirement, publishing two nursing textbooks, Podręcznik dla pielęgniarek (Manual for Nurses, 1958) and Pielęgniarstwo specjalistyczne (Specialized Nursing, 1962).

Hutner took a course offered by the World Health Organization (WHO) in Denmark in 1964 to study nursing management and the following year was asked to represent the Polish Nursing Association as their delegate for the International Council of Nurses (ICN). She was selected by the ICN to serve on the Admissions Committee for two terms. For seven years she was a lecturer at the Medical University of Lublin for the Nursing Department and taught courses at the Mother and Child Institute (pl) (Polish: Instytut Matki i Dziecka) in Warsaw. She was also an instructor and expert consultant for the WHO until 1968.

== Post-retirement ==
Hutner retired in 1973 but continued to support nursing development. She was one of the co-creators of an international survey sponsored by the Institut Henry-Dunant in Geneva to identify and predict health issues for the decade of the 1980s.

== Awards ==
Hutner received many awards during her career for her work in nursing. Among them are the Honorary Medal "For exemplary work in the health service" (pl) (1953); the Silver Cross of Merit (1954); the Gold Cross of Merit (1964); the Knight's Cross of the Order of Polonia Restituta (1972); the Medal of the 30th Anniversary of People's Poland (1974); and the Medal of the National Education Commission (pl) (1978). In 1995, Hutner was awarded the Florence Nightingale Medal for her development of nursing programs, supervisory duties at the Nursing Faculty of the Medical Academy of Warsaw, and her expert consultations with the World Health Organization. That same year, she was awarded an honorary doctorate from the Medical University of Lublin. She was awarded the Commander's Cross with the Star of the Order of Polonia Restituta in 2000 in recognition of her exemplary contributions to the country and development of Polish nursing.

== Death and legacy ==
Hutner died on 23 July 2008 in Warsaw and was buried in the Jewish Cemetery. She is recognized as a pioneer of the modern nursing profession in Poland.
