= Kollel Ohr Yosef =

Institute of rabbinic study in Ontario, Canada

Coordinates: 43°48′12.50″N 79°26′39.65″W

- Formation: October 2007
- Type: Kollel
- Location(s): 601 Clark Avenue West Thornhill, Ontario
- Rosh Kollel: Rabbi Mordechai Scheiner
- Website: thornhillkollel.com

Kollel Ohr Yosef is an institute of rabbinic study in Ontario, Canada, serving the Thornhill and northern Toronto communities.

As a "community kollel," its faculty engages in advanced study and also reaches out to the community by offering free informal sessions and religious guidance. The open-door institute also hosts all conventional prayers, including holiday services. The Kollel is a place where one connect with friendly and knowledgeable scholars.

== Faculty ==
The Kollel is led by its "Rosh Kollel", Rabbi Mordechai Scheiner. Rabbi Scheiner received his rabbinic ordination from HaRav Shlomo Miller. He was previously a student or faculty member in numerous prestigious institutions, including the Toronto Kollel Avreichim, the Kollel of Miami Beach, and the Kollel of Beth Medrash Govoha in Lakewood. The faculty and staff also includes approximately 14 others. They are dedicated to advanced Torah studies and the dissemination of Torah knowledge, and also come to the Kollel following years of studies at core yeshivos.

== Location ==
The Kollel is located at 80 York Hill Blvd, near Bathurst St. and Clark Ave. The building has free parking.

== History ==
The Kollel was formed in October, 2007. Its initial Rosh Kollel was Rabbi Avrohom Bitterman, currently the Rav of Thornhill's Ateres Mordechai. Kollel Ohr Yosef is named in honour of Joseph Tanenbaum, a philanthropist that benefited the Thornhill community.

== Programs ==
The Kollel's website best summarizes its many scheduled programs and events. They include a daily Morning Kollel and Night Seder. Some of these are offered in conjunction with other generous community institutions, such as the BAYT or NCSY. As an orthodox institution, the programming in many cases is gender-separate.
