= Aaron Schechter =

American Haredi rabbi (1928–2023)

Rabbi Aaron Schechter
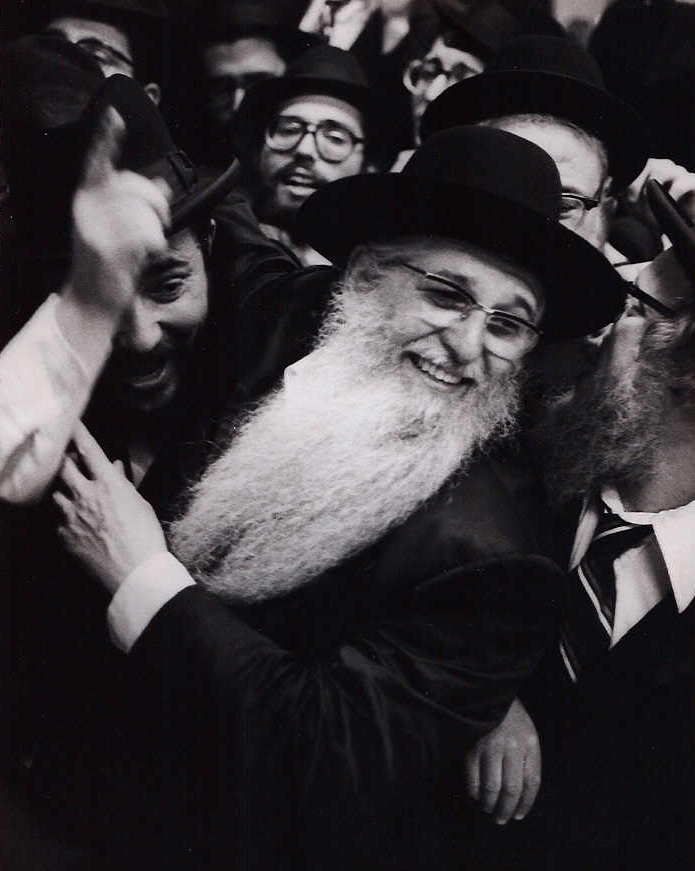
- In the late 1970s

Personal life
- Born: Aaron Moshe Schechter; July 16, 1928 Brooklyn, New York, U.S.
- Died: August 24, 2023 (aged 95) Brooklyn, New York, U.S.
- Spouse: Shoshana Roisa Leichtung (m. 1954)
- Children: 5
- Other name: Aaron Moshe Schechter

Religious life
- Religion: Judaism
- Denomination: Haredi

Jewish leader
- Predecessor: Yitzchak Hutner
- Successor: Shlomo Halioua zt'l
- Yeshiva: Yeshiva Rabbi Chaim Berlin
- Position: Rosh Yeshiva
- Yahrtzeit: Elul 7 5783

Aaron Moshe Schechter (July 16, 1928 – August 24, 2023) was an American Haredi rabbi. He served as Rosh Yeshiva (Dean) of Yeshiva Rabbi Chaim Berlin and its postgraduate division, Kollel Gur Aryeh. Schechter was also a member of the presidium of Agudath Israel of America and served on its Moetzes Gedolei HaTorah (Council of Great Torah Sages).

== Early life and education ==
Aaron Moshe Schechter was born in Brooklyn, New York City, to Yosef and Fruma Rochel Schechter. He received his early education at Yeshiva Toras Chaim Elementary School and later attended high school at Yeshiva Rabbi Chaim Berlin, where he studied under Yitzchak Hutner, who later became head of the institution.

Schechter spent much of his early adulthood studying and teaching at Yeshiva Rabbi Chaim Berlin, where he was given instructional and administrative responsibilities at a young age. He also studied for a period at Lakewood Yeshiva, where he developed close ties with its head, Aharon Kotler, and maintained long-term connections with the Lakewood Yeshiva community.

== Rabbinic career ==
=== Yeshiva Rabbi Chaim Berlin ===
Before his marriage to Shoshana Roisa Leichtung, Schechter was appointed by Yitzchok Hutner to leadership positions at Yeshiva Rabbi Chaim Berlin. He later became rosh yeshiva (dean) of the yeshiva and its postgraduate Talmudical division, Kollel Gur Aryeh, and was encouraged by Hutner to write Avodas Aharon, a rabbinic treatise on the Holy Temple. He also oversaw its affiliated branches in Brooklyn, including its elementary and high school programs.

In 1966, following the yeshiva’s relocation to Coney Island Avenue, Hutner officially designated Schechter and Yonasan David as co-roshei yeshiva. After Hutner’s death in 1980, Schechter continued to serve as rosh yeshiva, overseeing both the main yeshiva and its postgraduate division, Kollel Gur Aryeh.

=== Agudath Israel of America and Moetzes Gedolei HaTorah ===
Following Hutner’s death in 1980, Schechter became a member of the nesius (presidium) of Agudath Israel of America. After the death of Yaakov Yitzchak Ruderman in 1987, he was appointed to the Moetzes Gedolei HaTorah, the organization’s senior rabbinical council.

== Personal life and death ==
Schechter married Shoshana Roisa Leichtung in 1954. She was the Principal of General Studies at Yeshiva of Brooklyn's Girls' Elementary School for over 20 years. She died on August 4, 2016. They had five children together, Mordechai Zelig zt'l, Nosson, Esther, Nechama, and Yehudis.

Schechter died in Brooklyn on August 24, 2023, at the age of 95, following a period of declining health. Agudath Israel of America described him as "a true exemplar of da'as Torah", and noted his role in transmitting the teachings of his mentor, Yitzchak Hutner.

== Works ==
- Schechter, Aaron Moshe (1957). Avodas Aharon עבודת אהרון [Aaron's Work] (in Hebrew). New York. p. 180. Archived from the original on August 17, 2011.
