= Hasbara Fellowships =

Pro-Israeli foreign lobbying organization

Hasbara Fellowships Inc
- Formation: Tax-exempt since August 2011; 15 years ago
- Type: 501(c)(3)
- Tax ID no.: EIN 201651102
- Purpose: Israel lobby in the United States
- Headquarters: New York City
- Executive Director: Alan Levine
- Revenue: 1,662,265 USD (2025)
- Expenses: 1,392,917 USD (2025)
- Website: hasbarafellowships.org

Hasbara Fellowships is an organization that brings students to Israel and trains them to be effective pro-Israel activists on college campuses. Based in New York, it was started in 2001 by Aish HaTorah in conjunction with the Israel Ministry of Foreign Affairs. The organization claims to have trained nearly 2,000 students on over 220 North American campuses.

== Activities ==
Activists trained by Hasbara Fellowships have been involved in several campus rallies. In 2002, Hasbara Fellowships organized a rally at the National Student Palestinian Conference at the University of Michigan. In 2007, Hasbara Fellowships members at Brandeis University protested against former US President Jimmy Carter's book, Palestine: Peace Not Apartheid.

In May 2007, Hasbara Fellowships (co-sponsored by the Israeli Foreign Ministry) called for volunteers to counter a "dangerous trend" of Wikipedia entries portraying Israel in a "negative light". Interested readers were encouraged to consider "joining a team of Wikipedians to make sure Israel is presented fairly and accurately".

In 2008, Hasbara Fellowships helped to organize "Islamic State Apartheid Week" at York University to counter the rival "Israeli Apartheid Week".

In 2010, Hasbara Fellows created Israel Peace Week as a response to Israel Apartheid Week. In its first year, the program reached 28 campuses in the US and three in Australia.

== See also ==
- Hasbara
- Internet Haganah
- Aish HaTorah
- Adam and Gila Milstein Family Foundation
- Israel On Campus Coalition "Hasbara Fellowships" is a founding member.
