= Shlomo Freifeld =

American rabbi (1925–1990)

Shlomo Freifeld (1925–1990) was an influential figure in the world of Orthodox Judaism who established a Yeshiva and Jewish community in the New York City area. He influenced tens of thousands of students and was a key figure in the US-based Baal Teshuva movement which brought a massive wave of secular Jews back to Orthodox Judaism throughout the seventies and eighties. The Orthodox Union's tribute lionized him as "one of the founders of the Baal Tshuva movement."

== Early life and education ==
Freifeld was born in 1925 in East New York to "a minimally observant family". He was sent to Yeshiva Toras Chaim (and later on Yeshiva Rabbi Chaim Berlin) so that his parents could work longer hours.

Dr. Judith Resnik, one of the seven astronauts killed when the Challenger shuttle exploded, was a cousin of Freifeld.

== Educator ==
He was a top student of Rabbi Isaac Hutner, and eventually served as the principal of Yeshivas Rabbi Chaim Berlin, which was then located in Far Rockaway, New York. After Chaim Berlin moved to Brooklyn, Freifeld chose to remain in Far Rockaway and founded the Sh'or Yoshuv Yeshiva. The Yeshiva catered to individuals that did not fit into the mold of what other contemporary Yeshivas expected in their students. It emphasized warmth and creativity in a way that was quite unheard of in orthodox Yeshivas at the time.

== Impact ==
Freifeld's approach to teaching Judaism attracted students from a wide variety of Jewish backgrounds.

Freifeld was also a key figure in the establishment of the Peilim movement in Israel. His students include many key Jewish figures such as Rabbi Moshe Dov Stein, Rabbi Shmuel Brazil, Rabbi Chanina Herzberg and Rabbi Moshe Weinberger.

The Orthodox Jewish community that grew around Sh'or Yoshuv in the seventies and eighties is largely responsible for the sizable Jewish communities present in the Far Rockaway and Five Towns areas today.

== Relationship with Bob Dylan and Allen Ginsberg ==
Two notable protegees were Bob Dylan and Allen Ginsberg. The two were introduced to Rabbi Freifeld at a wedding party he hosted for his student Barbara Rubin, an influential filmmaker and performance artist who had worked with both in her former career.

Dylan would frequently drive out to Far Rockaway in his Ferrari or with a chauffeur to come speak with Rabbi Freifeld about his questions about his Jewish heritage. He is said to have been so taken with Freifeld that he wanted to buy property in Long Beach, NY and attend the Yeshiva, but ultimately did not join as Rabbi Freifeld stipulated that he would need to join the yeshiva completely and live in the dormitory with the other students. On another occasion, Dylan offered to host a concert to benefit Sh'or Yoshuv, which Rabbi Freifeld refused.

Dylan is quoted as saying, when visiting Freifeld on a particularly cold New York's winter night, “it may be dark and snowy outside, but inside that house, it's so light.”

== Additional Sources ==
- Reb Shlomo, The Life and Legacy of Rabbi Shlomo Freifeld, Rabbi Yisroel Besser, Judaica Press, New York 2008
- Kayama Films, Profiles in Courage and Mesiras Nefesh, script manuscript
- https://www.nytimes.com/1990/10/08/obituaries/shlomo-freifeld-rabbi-66.html
- https://rabbifreifeld.com/
- Rabbi Freifeld Speaks: The Dynamic Teachings of an Inspirational Rebbe, Rabbi Yaakov Yosef Reinman, Artscroll, New York 2004
- In Search Of Greatness: The Shmuessen Of Rabbi Shlomo Freifeld, 2008, Judaica Press, ISBN 9781932443981
- https://rabbifreifeld.com/wp-content/uploads/2014/06/Jewish-Observer.pdf
- https://rabbifreifeld.com/wp-content/uploads/2014/06/Jewish-Action.pdf
- https://rabbifreifeld.com/wp-content/uploads/2017/09/IMG_4044.jpg
- https://rabbifreifeld.com/wp-content/uploads/2014/06/Reservation-Detour.htm
- https://rabbifreifeld.com/wp-content/uploads/2014/06/mishpacha.pdf
- https://rabbifreifeld.com/wp-content/uploads/2014/06/Hamodia.pdf
- http://pillarofmyforever.blogspot.com/
- https://www.thejewishstar.com/stories/the-freifeld-legacy,16454
