= Steven Burg =

American Orthodox rabbi

Steven Burg (born April 23, 1972) is an American Orthodox rabbi, educator, and Jewish communal leader. He serves as the Chief Executive Officer (CEO) of Aish, a Jewish outreach organization.

== Education ==
Rabbi Burg graduted from Yeshiva University High School for Boys in 1989. He received his rabbinic ordination and a master’s degree in Medieval Jewish History from Yeshiva University in 1996. He completed executive education programs at Northwestern University’s Kellogg School of Management in 2011 and Harvard Business School in 2012.

== Career ==
In 1991, Burg began his career at the Orthodox Union (OU), serving until 2013. During this time, he held the positions of OU Managing Director and International Director of NCSY, the OU's youth movement.

From January 2013 to June 2015, Burg was the Eastern Director of the Simon Wiesenthal Center. He managed the Museum of Tolerance in New York City and worked on efforts to combat antisemitism.

Since 2015, Burg has been the CEO of Aish. He introduced AishVision2030, a ten-year plan aimed at engaging young unaffiliated Jews and addressing antisemitism through education. He has also been involved in interfaith initiatives and discussions.

Burg serves on the Board of Governors for the Jewish Agency, the Executive Board of the Rabbinical Council of America, and the boards of Yeshiva University High School and Naaleh High School.

At NCSY, Burg founded the Jewish Student Union (JSU) and the Anne Samson Jerusalem Journey (TJJ), a summer program for teens.
