= Zvi Hirsch Chajes =

Galician rabbi and Talmudic scholar (1805–1855)

Rabbi Zvi Hirsch Chajes
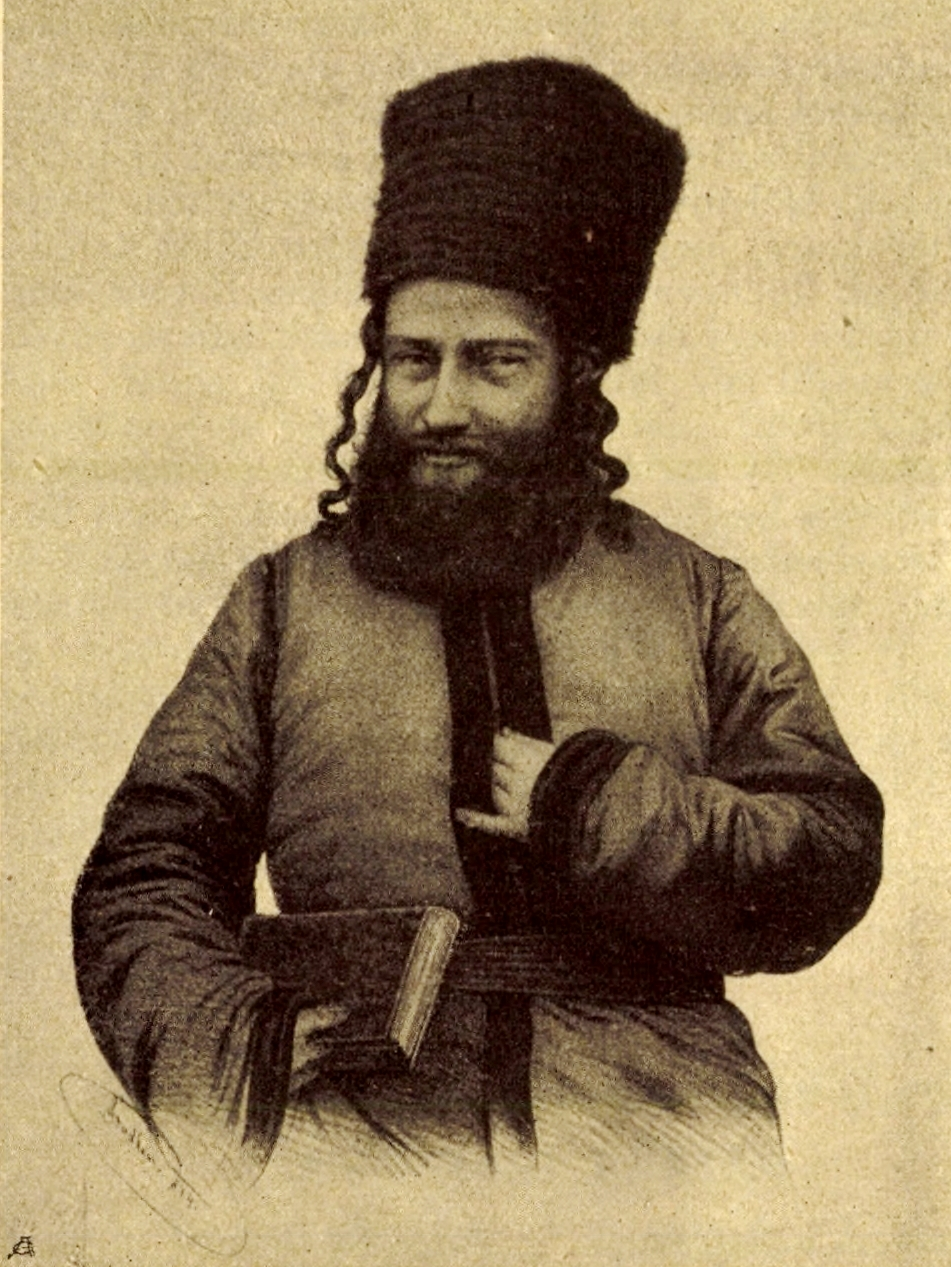
- Rabbi Zvi Hirsch Chajes
- Title: Rabbi

Personal life
- Born: November 20, 1805 Brody, Galicia
- Died: October 12, 1855 (aged 49) Kalisz, Poland
- Education: Studied under R. Ephraim Zalman Margulies, Doctor of Philosophy
- Occupation: Rabbi

Religious life
- Religion: Judaism

Jewish leader
- Main work: Mevo Hatalmud
- Other: Rabbi of Zhovkva, Rabbi of Kalisz

Zvi Hirsch Chajes (Hebrew: צבי הירש חיות - November 20, 1805 - October 12, 1855; also Chayes or Hayot or Chiyos) was a Galician talmudic scholar. He is best known for his work Mevo Hatalmud (Introduction to the Talmud), which serves both as commentary and introduction. Chayes is also known as "The Maharatz Chajes" (מהר"ץ חיות), the Hebrew acronym for "Our Teacher, the Rabbi, Zvi Chayes".

== Early life ==
Chajes was born in Brody. He studied under scholars of that time, particularly R. Ephraim Zalman Margulies. In addition to his talmudic education, he was educated in modern and classical languages and literature, as well as geography, history, and philosophy. In 1846, a law was promulgated in Austria compelling rabbinical candidates to pass a university examination in liberal arts and philosophy; Chajes received the degree of Doctor of Philosophy.

== Career ==
At age twenty two, he was called to occupy a rabbinic position in the district of Zhovkva (Zolkiev), Galicia. In this position, he fought against innovations introduced into Judaism at that time, and opposed the increasing conservatism among his Orthodox colleagues. Chajes died prematurely in 1855 at age 50, three years after he was appointed to the post of rabbi of Kalisz (Kalish), Poland.

Chajes produced many scientific studies of Judaism that were faithful to tradition, but modern in their orientation and organization. In this role, he is closely associated with Nachman Krochmal and S. L. Rapoport. "There are few modern works dealing in detail with the Halakha or the Aggadah which have not profited by the labors of Chajes, although his name is often passed over in silence. His Introduction to the Talmud is especially noteworthy..." Dr. Bruria Hutner David described Chajes as "Traditionalist and Maskil" - as the subject of her PhD thesis.

The name Zvi Hirsch is a bilingual tautological name in Yiddish. It means literally "deer-deer" and is traceable back to the Hebrew word צבי tsvi "deer" and the German word Hirsch "deer".

== Works ==
Mevo Hatalmud (Introduction to the Talmud) deals with both the Halakha, the legal aspects of the Talmud, and the Aggadah, the non-legal portions. In this work, Chajes imparts a detailed history and classification of the Talmud and its underlying oral tradition. This work is the first modern attempt on the part of Orthodoxy to formulate the nature, extent, and authority of tradition.

Chajes also authored:

- Torat Neviim: treatises on the authority of Talmudic tradition, and on the organic structure and methodology of the Talmud.
- Darkhei Horaah: an examination of the rules that obtained in Talmudic times in deciding practical religious questions.
- Imre Binah: treatises on the relation of Babylonian and Jerusalem Talmuds, on lost aggadah collections, on the Targumim, on Rashi's commentary to tractate Taanit, and on Bath Kol.
- Tiferet L'Moshe
- Minhat Kenaot: against Reform Judaism.
- Glosses to the Talmud, now published as standard in the Romm-Vilna edition of the Talmud.

== Resources ==
- "Mevo Hatalmud". Trans. The Students' Guide Through The Talmud, 2 ed., Jacob Shachter, Yashar Books, 2005. ISBN 1-933143-05-3
- "Rebi Tzvi Hirsch Chayes", Meir Hershkowits, Mossad Harav Kook, 1972
- Chamiel Ephraim, The Middle Way - The Emergence of Modern Religious Trends in Nineteenth-Century Judaism, Academic Studies Press, Brighton 2014, Vol I, pp 34–39, 67-81, 179-219, 365-391, Vol II' pp. 15–37, 139-151, 224-237, 295-298.
