= Yaakov Feitman =

American rabbi

Yaakov Feitman is a rabbi, speaker and author who helped build and expand congregations in more than one geographic region and was the founding principal of three schools.

Feitman was born in 1948 in a Displaced Persons camp to Holocaust survivors.

== Professional ==
He received rabbinical ordination from rabbis Moshe Feinstein and Yitzchak Hutner.

Feitman is a past president of the Young Israel Council of Rabbis, has been a Scholar-in-Residence all over the world and spoken at OU, Torah Umesorah and Agudah conventions.

== Congregation Builder ==
Presently the rabbi of the "Red Shul", Kehillas Bais Yehuda Tzvi in Cedarhurst, New York, he has held pulpits in Cleveland, Ohio and Teaneck, NJ.

=== Cleveland, Ohio ===
In 1983, moved from Brooklyn to become the rabbi of Young Israel of Cleveland, which at the time had congregations in Cleveland Heights and South Euclid. Feitman divided his time between and duties between the two locations and helped guide these congregants, over a period of years, through this transition. Later he helped with another transition in what became the Young Israel of Beachwood, located in a Cleveland-suburb.

Those years involved not only religious matters but dealing with extensive problems regarding land use and discrimination .

== Authorship ==
- The Rogatchover Gaon (biography)
- "The Halachic Process" (recording)
- "Daas Torah: Tapping the Source of Eternal Wisdom". In: Torah Lives, ed. Nisson Wolpin. Brooklyn, NY: Mesorah Publications, 1995. Pg ix-xxviii. ISBN 0-89906-319-5.
- "The invention of religion" pp. 67–68 (ISBN 0-8135-3093-8) by Derek R. Peterson & Darren R. Walhof
- Out of the Iron Furnace (Shengold Publishing, ISBN 0-88400-040-0), by Rabbi Eliezer Ben-David, translated into English and adapted by Rabbi Yaakov Feitman
- a Eulogy he wrote for Rabbi Mordechai Gifter for Yated Neeman
- an article written for Mishpacha regarding the decades since the passing of Rabbi Yitzchok Hutner
- Wrote articles for Mishpacha Magazine
- Writes weekly articles in Yated Neeman
- Blueprints: Torah views of the world and events around us (ISBN 1-4226-2614-8): Mesorah Publications
- Days of Reflection, Days of Joy Discovering the Gifts of Elul, the Yamim Noraim and Succos(ISBN 1-4226-3909-6): Mesorah Publications
