= Andres Spokoiny =

Argentine-born Jewish nonprofit executive

Andrés Spokoiny
- Born: 1968 (age 57–58); Buenos Aires, Argentina
- Education: University of Buenos Aires; Hebrew University of Jerusalem
- Occupations: Nonprofit executive, author
- Known for: President & CEO, Jewish Funders Network

Andrés Spokoiny (born 1968) is an Argentine-born Jewish nonprofit executive, and author. Based in New York City, he is President and CEO of the Jewish Funders Network (JFN), a global association of Jewish philanthropists and foundations.

== Early life and education ==
Spokoiny was born in Buenos Aires to a family of Polish-Jewish immigrants. He studied business administration at the University of Buenos Aires and Jewish education at the Hebrew University of Jerusalem.

== Career ==
Spokoiny began his career with IBM in South America before joining the American Jewish Joint Distribution Committee (JDC) in 1997. Based in Paris, he oversaw community rebuilding efforts across Northeast Europe. He later directed Leatid Europe, a leadership training institute for Jewish professionals, and served as executive director of Federation CJA in Montreal from 2009 to 2011.

In 2011, he became President and CEO of the Jewish Funders Network, where he leads efforts to shape ethical Jewish philanthropy internationally. Through JFN, he has addressed crises such as the COVID-19 pandemic and the Twelve-Day War, advising funders on pacing and prioritization during rapidly evolving conflicts.

Spokoiny also contributes commentary on the ethics of contemporary philanthropy, exploring themes like individual giving versus federated structures and moral use of philanthropic power.

== Other roles ==
He has served as a board member of the JDC International Centre for Community Development, and on the selection committee for the Genesis Prize Foundation, a position he has held since 2013.

== Publications ==
Spokoiny is the author of the non-fiction book "Tradition and Transition: Jewish Communities and the Hyper Empowered Individual" (2024), and the novel "El Impio".
