= Spinka financial controversy =

Tax fraud and money laundering case

The Spinka financial controversy was a 2007 case in the United States in which five charitable organizations under the auspices of the Brooklyn-based Spinka Hasidic sect were investigated for tax fraud and money laundering, resulting in the convictions of the sect's rebbe, his assistant, a banker, and several others.

== Indictments and arrests ==
Grand Rabbi Naftali Tzvi Weisz and his gabbai (assistant), Moshe Zigelman, bank manager Joseph Roth, along with three others were arrested in Los Angeles by the FBI on December 19, 2007 on charges of conspiracy to defraud the Internal Revenue Service, mail fraud, money laundering, and operating an illegal money remitting business. Zigelman was also charged with aiding in the preparation of fraudulent income tax returns. Two other men were charged in the scheme, but were believed to be in Israel.

Weisz and Zigelman had solicited $8.7 million in bogus charitable donations since 1996, of which up to 95% were refunded, while the sect kept nearly $750,000 as a kickback. The donors fraudulently claimed the contributions on their income tax returns. Money was laundered with the help of Roth via jewelry businesses in Los Angeles, as well as banks and other businesses in Israel. Additionally, five Brooklyn-based Spinka-run charities were also included as defendants in the money laundering charge.

The case was broken with the help of a confidential informant, Robert Kasirer, who turned state's evidence in October 2004. He had contributed $1.7 million to the charity fraud scheme, was facing separate civil charges related to fraud in his health care business, and secretly recorded the others for investigators.

== Convictions and sentencing ==
Joseph Roth, a manager for United Mizrahi Bank, pleaded guilty on June 27, 2008 to one count of conspiracy to commit tax fraud before United States District Judge George P. Schiavelli in Los Angeles. He was later sentenced to fourteen months in prison, time served. Zeligman pleaded guilty in June 2008 to a conspiracy charge, and was sentenced on March 30, 2009 by US District Judge John F. Walter to 24 months in prison. He admitted guilt through an interpreter, and asked for leniency, citing the Jewish concept of teshuva.

Weisz and four others pleaded guilty on August 3, 2009 to charges of conspiracy to obstruct the IRS and operating an unlicensed money transmitting business before Judge Walter. The latter sentenced Weisz on December 21, 2009 to two years in prison, citing a belief that the scheme was not for personal enrichment in setting a shorter sentence. The four other defendants were sentenced each to four months imprisonment, ordered to do community service, as well as pay fines and/or forfeiture.

== Aftermath ==
After his arrest, Weisz began to do community outreach, asking people to follow the law. Prosecutors affirmed this was helpful, but had still advocated a longer sentence than he received. He continued to speak out even after conviction, showing remorse for his actions.

Zigelman refused to testify before a federal grand jury in 2011 during a continuing investigation into alleged tax evasion by the sect. He cited the Jewish concept of mesirah, which restricts when Jews may testify against fellow Jews in a non-Jewish court, and was threatened with imprisonment for contempt of court. He was found in contempt by US District Judge Margaret M. Morrow on March 16, 2012 and was subject to up to eighteen months imprisonment unless he agreed to testify. He appealed to the 9th Circuit Court and was denied. He surrendered in May 2012 and was released by Morrow in December the same year, stating that further confinement would have no effect.

== Reactions ==
After the arrests, rabbi Meyer H. May, president of the Rabbinical Council of California condemned the scheme, saying it was against Torah values to defraud the government. He also cautioned against lashon hara (gossip) and had emphasized the allegeds presumption of innocence. He urged the community to "examine its values, [commit] to truth, [and understand] how [God] wants us to act." Orthodox Jews wrestled with the issue of whether Kasirer, the informant, could be considered a moser (a Jew who reports another Jew to the government), but widely condemned the fraud scheme itself.

Jonathan Sarna, a professor of American Jewish history at Brandeis University noted that there was likely a cultural carryover from life under corrupt governments in Eastern Europe, and compared it to the fraudulent grant scheme in New Square, New York. Samuel Heilman, a professor at the City University of New York who studies Orthodox Judaism, told The Forward that such sects often disregard secular law and view the government as an enemy, but their actions are "more venal and selfish" than they would admit.
