= Beth Jacob Jerusalem =

Coordinates: 31°47′51.6″N 35°12′22.6″E

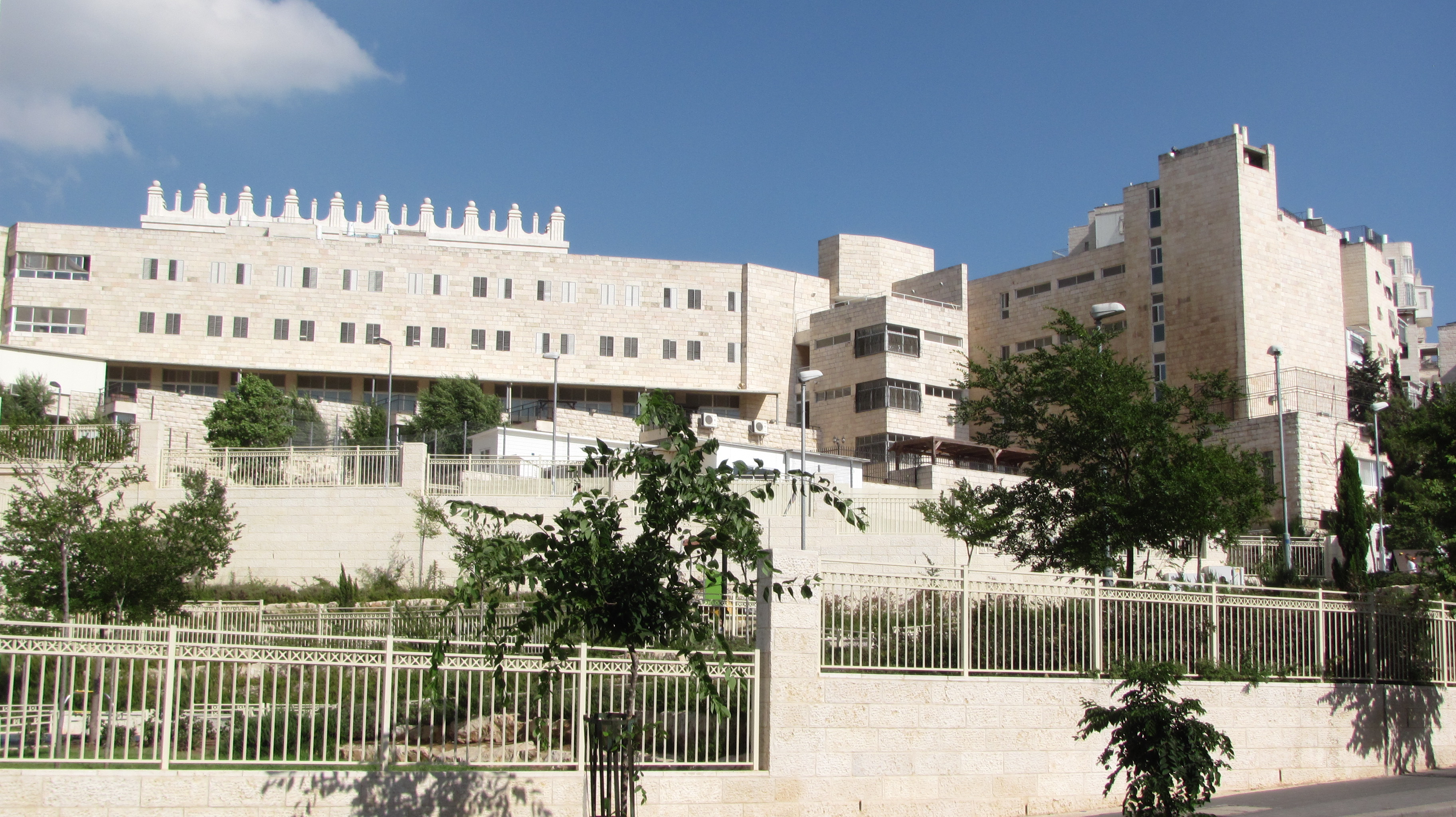
Beth Jacob Jerusalem

Beth Jacob Jerusalem (Hebrew: סמינר בית יעקב למורות, Seminar Bais Yaakov LeMorot), also known as Machon Sarah Schneirer, commonly referred to as BJJ, is a Haredi religious girls seminary located in the Unsdorf neighborhood of Jerusalem. It was founded in the early 1970s by Rebbetzin Bruria David. Approximately 180 girls are educated in this elite institution each year.

As of 2014, tuition per student amounted to US$15,500 and room and board is an additional US$4,000.

== Founding ==
Rebbetzin David, the daughter of Rav Yitzchok Hutner, founded Beth Jacob Jerusalem as a post-high-school seminary geared for American and European graduates of Bais Yaakov high schools who wish to pursue Torah study on a high academic level. The seminary also provides professional training toward a teaching degree. Rebbetzin David interviews each applicant to maintain the school's reputation as one of the "elite" institutions in the Haredi world.
