= Milstein Family Foundation =

Nonprofit organization

Adam and Gila Milstein Family Foundation
- Abbreviation: MFF
- Formation: 2000; 26 years ago
- Founders: Adam and Gila Milstein
- Type: Nonprofit
- Tax ID no.: 95-4824595
- Purpose: Promote Israeli advocacy and education
- Headquarters: Los Angeles, California
- President: Adam Milstein
- Budget: $2.23 million (2024)
- Website: www.milsteinff.org

The Adam and Gila Milstein Family Foundation (MFF) is a Los Angeles, California-based nonprofit founded in 2000, which aims to strengthen the State of Israel and its ties to the United States, as well as to strengthen the Jewish identity of American Jews and their connection to Israel.

== Overview ==
The Milstein Family Foundation was founded in 2000 by Adam Milstein and his wife Gila, and is based in Los Angeles. Milstein serves as the president of the foundation.

The foundation's stated mission is to "strengthen American values, support the U.S.-Israel alliance, and combat bigotry and hatred in all forms." The foundation has three main operating principles: "Active Philanthropy", "Life Path Impact", and "Philanthropic Synergy". "Active Philanthropy" means that the foundation remains actively involved, investing time and resources to ensure the impact and success of the organizations, projects, and programs they support. The foundation also offers grants to support students on college campuses. The grants are available to help fund cultural events, coalition-building initiatives, campaigns, and social media activism led by students. The foundation also works to strengthen the Jewish people and their affinity to the State of Israel.

== Initiatives ==
Some of the foundation's funding has directed toward activism on college campuses, including to groups such as the Israel on Campus Coalition StandWithUs, the Alpha Epsilon Pi Jewish fraternity, and academic group Scholars for Peace in the Middle East. In partnership with the American-Israel Educational Foundation (AIEF), the educational wing of the American Israel Public Affairs Committee (AIPAC), the foundation created the Campus Allies Mission to Israel and the Campus Allies delegation to AIPAC's annual policy conference. The initiatives aim to help African American, Christian, and Latino student leaders become advocates for Israel. The Campus Allies Mission to Israel is for non-Jewish, Zionist student leaders and activists who have not been to Israel and are ineligible for Birthright Israel.

The foundation partnered with the Israeli Video Network in December 2015 to launch an "Inspired by Israel" video contest, with the purpose of showcasing how people are inspired by Israel. The foundation launched a "Milstein Meme Competition" in July 2017 in an effort to find the "funny side of pro-Israel activism." The foundation launched a website called Virtually Israel 2.0 in January 2018, which hosts virtual reality tours of popular sites in Israel.

== See also ==
- Steinhardt Foundation for Jewish Life
