= Yeshiva Pachad Yitzchok =

Coordinates: 31.79008°N 35.17578°E

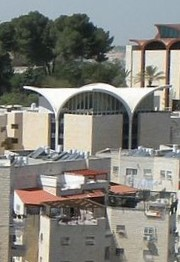
The yeshiva building with its designed roof

Yeshiva Pachad Yitzchok (Hebrew: יְשִׁיבַת פחד יצחק) is a yeshiva in Jerusalem, established in the late 1970s by Rabbi Yitzchak Hutner in the Har Nof neighborhood. Hutner had served as the long-standing Rosh yeshiva of Yeshiva Rabbi Chaim Berlin and Kollel Gur Aryeh in Brooklyn, New York City. Upon the death of Hutner in 1980, leadership of the yeshiva passed to his son-in-law, Rabbi Yonasan David who is the present Rosh Yeshiva. Rabbi Chaim Yitzchok Kaplan serves as the deputy Rosh Yeshiva of Yeshiva Pachad Yitzchok.

== Gallery ==
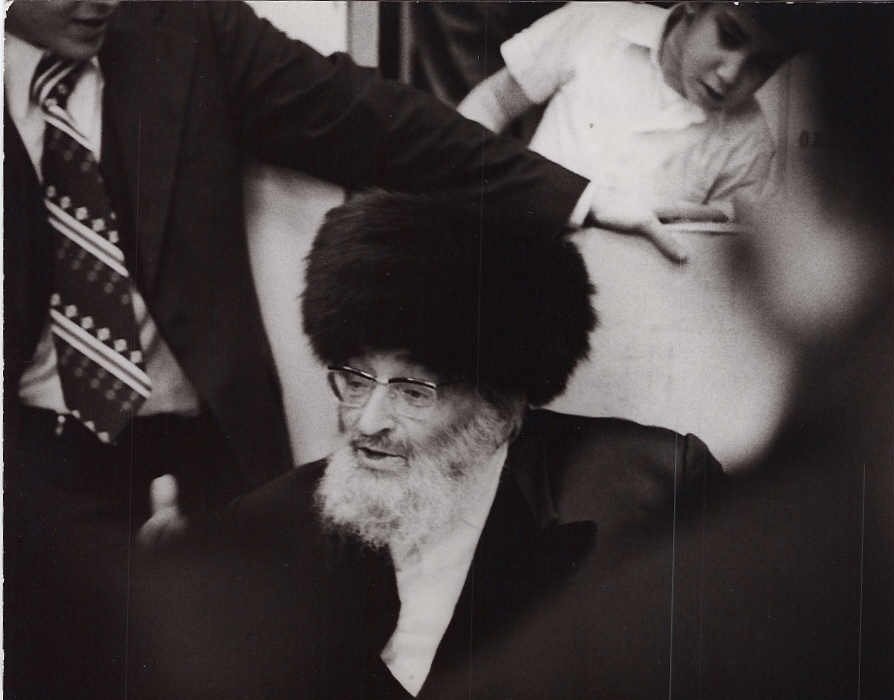
Rabbi Yitzchak Hutner was the Rosh yeshiva of Yeshiva Rabbi Chaim Berlin in Brooklyn, New York, and founder of Yeshiva Pachad Yitzchok in Jerusalem.

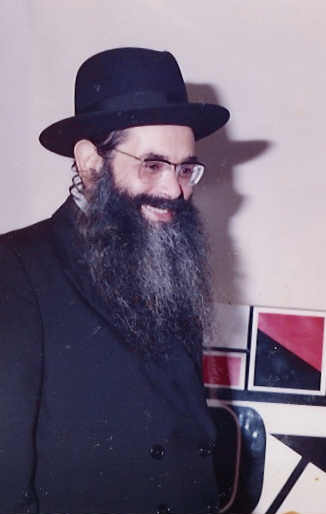
Rabbi Yonason David is Rosh yeshiva of Yeshiva Pachad Yitzchok in Jerusalem and of Yeshiva Rabbi Chaim Berlin in Brooklyn, New York.
