= NCSY =

Orthodox Jewish youth group

- Predecessor: Torah Leadership Seminar
- Formation: 1954; 72 years ago
- Founder: Harold and Enid Boxer
- Type: Jewish youth organization
- Legal status: Subsidiary of a 501(c)(3) non-profit religious organization
- Headquarters: 40 Rector Street, New York City, New York, United States
- Location: United States, Canada, Argentina, Chile, Israel, Mexico
- Coordinates: 40.705279812590774°N 74.01396840186057°W
- Owner: Natan Cohen
- International Director: Rabbi Micah Greenland
- Parent organization: Orthodox Union
- Website: www.ncsy.org
- Formerly called: National Conference of Synagogue Youth

NCSY (formerly known as the National Conference of Synagogue Youth) is a Jewish youth group under the auspices of the Orthodox Union. Its operations include Jewish-inspired after-school programs; summer programs in Israel, Europe, and the United States; weekend programming, shabbatons, retreats, and regionals; Israel advocacy training; and disaster relief missions known as chesed (kindness) trips. NCSY also has an alumni organization on campuses across North America.

== History ==
In 1954, following the passing of a resolution at that year's convention of the Orthodox Union, the NCSY was launched with the goal of enabling Jewish teenagers to lead fulfilling Jewish lives. The first chapter was established in Savannah in October 1955 but nationally the movement was disorganized because there was no professional leadership. In 1959 however Rabbi Pinchas Stolper was chosen as its first full-time national director.

During the social upheavals of the 1960s and 1970s, the Orthodox youth of NCSY opposed social change, choosing instead to emphasize religious tradition. In this period, at least one NCSY chapter took public action on this point, passing a resolution rejecting marijuana and other drugs as a violation of Jewish law. At the 1971 NCSY international convention, delegates passed resolutions in this vein, calling for members to "forge a social revolution with Torah principles."

According to the Orthodox sociologist Chaim Waxman, there has been an increase in Haredi influence on NCSY since 2012. Waxman based this on NCSY's own sociological self-study.

== Alumni ==
- David Luchins (born 1946), Touro College professor and chair of its political science department
- Jeffrey Saks (born 1969), Modern Orthodox rabbi, educator, writer, and editor

== Former Staff ==
- David Bashevkin (born 1985), Modern Orthodox rabbi, writer, adjunct professor, podcast host, and NCSY Director of Education
- Steven Burg (born 1972), Orthodox rabbi, educator, Jewish communal leader, CEO of Aish, and NCSY International Director
- Aryeh Kaplan (1934–1983), Orthodox rabbi, author, and translator best known for his Living Torah edition of the Torah, and NCSY Director of Publishing
- Baruch Lanner (born 1949), former Orthodox rabbi convicted of child sexual abuse, former principal of Hillel Yeshiva High School in Ocean Township, New Jersey, and former NCSY Director of Regions
- Pinchas Stolper (1931–2022), Orthodox rabbi and writer, spokesman for Jewish Orthodoxy, and NCSY National Director
- Baruch Taub, Canadian-American founding rabbi of the Beth Avraham Yoseph of Toronto, and former NCSY National Director

== See also ==
- Orthodox Judaism outreach
- United Synagogue Youth, the youth group of Conservative Judaism
- National Federation of Temple Youth, the youth movement of Reform Judaism
- Young Judaea, the pluralist Zionist youth movement of Hadassah
- BBYO, the leading non-denominational Jewish youth movement
- Bnei Akiva, the largest religious Zionist youth movement in the world
- Baal teshuva
