= Aish HaTorah =

Orthodox Jewish educational organization

Aish/Aish HaTorah
- אש התורה
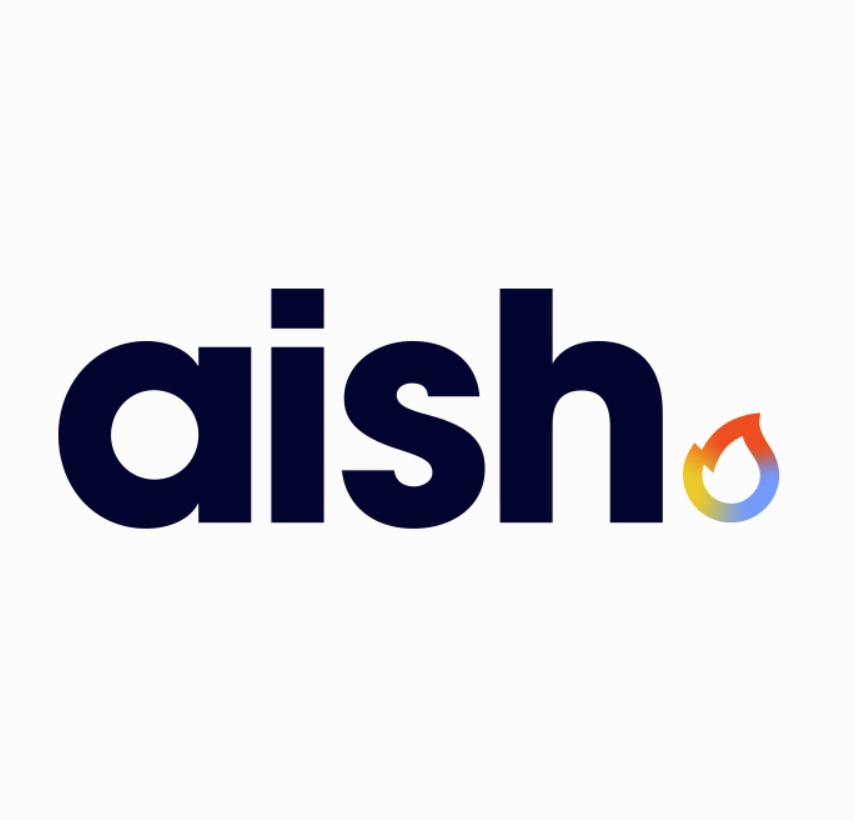

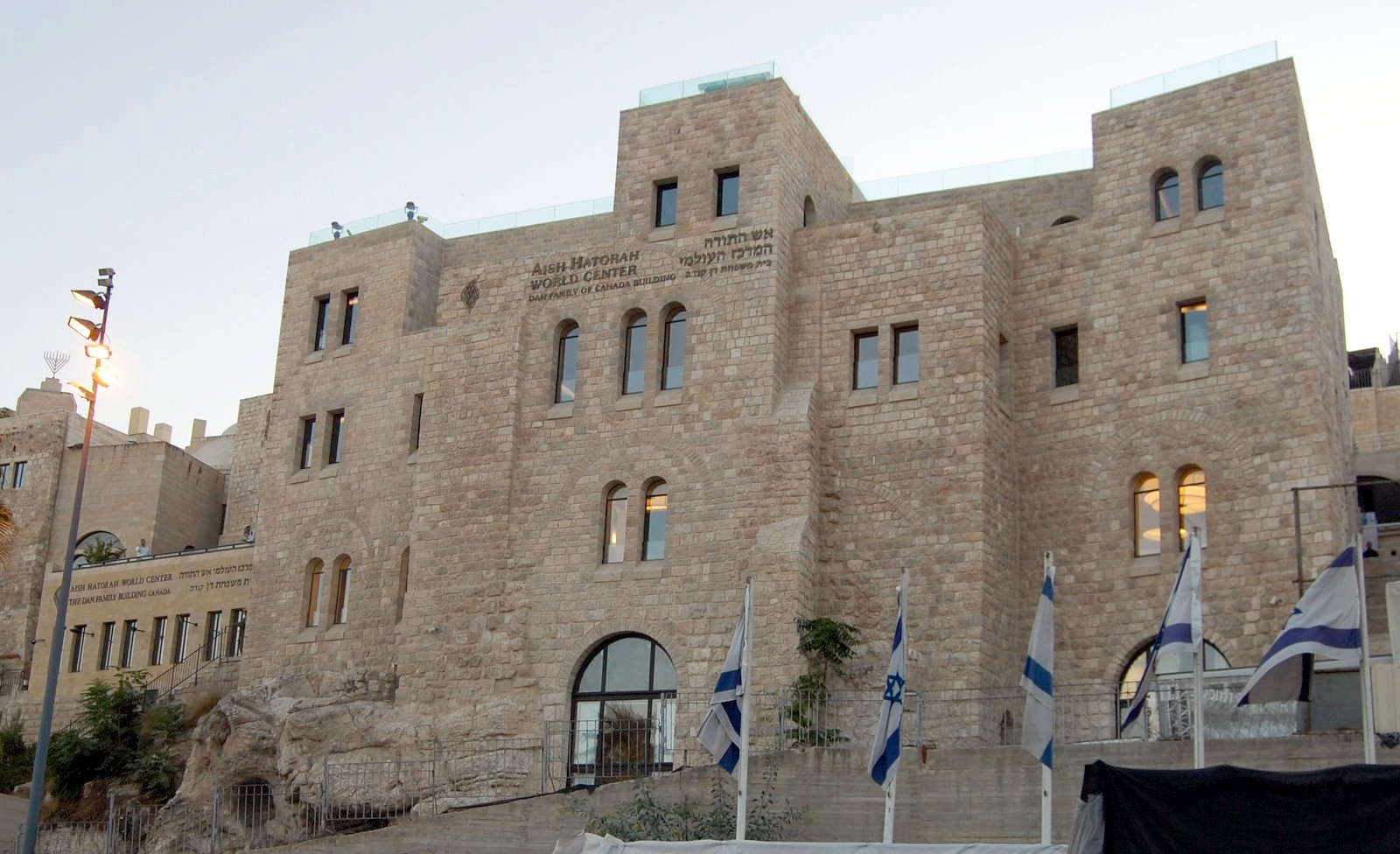
- Aish HaTorah World Center in Jerusalem
- Nickname: Aish
- Established: 1974
- Founder: Rabbi Noah Weinberg
- Type: Nonprofit
- Purpose: Jewish education
- Headquarters: Jerusalem, Israel
- Services: Online educational content, Yeshiva, classes, seminars
- Rosh Yeshiva: Rabbi Yitzchak Berkovits
- CEO: Rabbi Steven Burg
- Key people: Steven Burg; Yitzchak Berkovitz; Jamie Geller
- Affiliations: Orthodox Judaism
- Website: aish.com

Aish, formerly known as Aish HaTorah (Hebrew: אש התורה, lit. 'Fire of the Torah'), is a Jewish Orthodox educational organization. The focus of Aish is the spread of traditional Jewish religious teachings and culture to Jews around the globe, utilizing a significant online presence made up of its website, Aish.com, and various social media channels.

In addition to the educational organization, the organization's main campus in Jerusalem also includes a yeshiva and a women's seminary, as well as several other in-person programs. In the late 1990s, the Los Angeles branch of Aish pioneered the speed dating concept as a way to promote marriages between Jewish partners.

In 2001, as part of its outreach and advocacy, Aish set up the Hasbara Fellowships, an initiative designed to combat anti-Israel ideas on North American college campuses, in collaboration with the Israeli Foreign Ministry.

== History ==
Aish, founded in Jerusalem in 1974 by Rabbi Noah Weinberg after leaving the Ohr Somayach yeshiva, which he had co-founded, aimed to educate young Jewish students, particularly travellers and volunteers, in the history and traditions of Orthodox Judaism. It later expanded worldwide and established 30 branches; each is currently run as its own entity. Aish continues to promote an extensive array of relevant in-person courses and online educational material. After Weinberg died in February 2009, his son, Rabbi Hillel Weinberg, served as interim dean for a few years. In 2015, Rabbi Steven Burg was named CEO of the organization, and, in 2019, Rabbi Yitzchak Berkovits was named rosh yeshiva.

== Politics ==
The organization is ideologically conservative. Its officials have stated they oppose a full hand-over of the West Bank to the Palestinians. In 2012, Aish HaTorah officials were linked to the Clarion Fund, publishers of the controversial film The Third Jihad, alleging a Muslim strategy to infiltrate and dominate America.

== Activities ==
Aish operates roughly 32 full-time branches on five continents, providing seminars, singles events, executive learning groups, Shabbat and Jewish holiday programs, and community-building. Its Jerusalem headquarters includes a high-tech main campus and outreach center featuring a rooftop vista overlooking the Temple Mount.

The organization operates a website at Aish.com that attracts a global audience. Among the services offered are live chat sessions with Rabbis who are available to answer questions.

In the late 1998, Rabbi Yaakov Deyo, then Educational Director of the Los Angeles branch of Aish, invented the speed dating concept. Speed dating events under the auspices of Aish have continued to the present, designed to promote marriages between Jewish partners and thus continue the Jewish tradition.

In 2001, the Israeli Foreign Ministry worked with Aish HaTorah to create the Hasbara Fellowships, an initiative designed to combat anti-Israel ideas on North American college campuses. A 2001 investigation by The Guardian linked the pro-Israel media monitoring group HonestReporting's early operations to Aish HaTorah, which was described at the time as a right-wing extremist organization.

In December 2013, Aish HaTorah of New York filed suit against its former chief financial officer Jacob Fetman to enforce a Beth Din ruling that Fetman had stolen $20 million in funds from the organization.

== Notable faculty ==
- Noah Weinberg (1930 – 2009), founder
- Chaim Malinowitz (1952 – 2019)
- Rabbi Steven Burg, CEO
- Rabbi Yitzchak Berkovits, Rosh Yeshiva

== See also ==
- Orthodox Judaism outreach
- Baal teshuva
