= Kollel Gur Aryeh =

Coordinates: 40°37′7″N 73°57′49″W

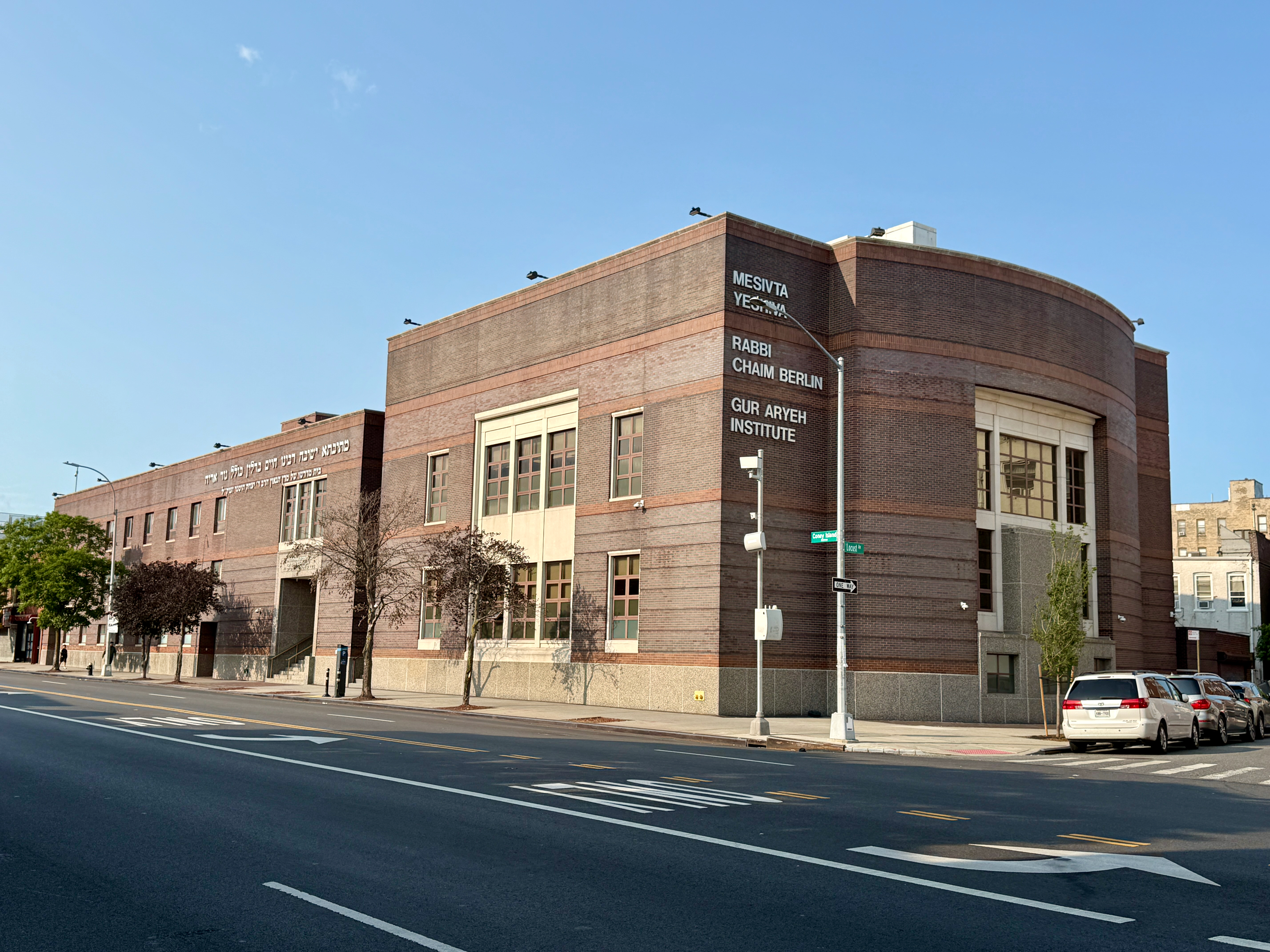
The building of Yeshiva Rabbi Chaim Berlin

Kollel Gur Aryeh (Hebrew: כולל גור אריה) is a kollel for young married Orthodox men located in Brooklyn, New York. It was established in 1956 by Rabbi Yitzchak Hutner as the post-graduate division of the Yeshiva Rabbi Chaim Berlin. A number of Haredi scholars and rosh yeshivas are among its alumni. The kollel is named in honor of Rabbi Judah Loew ben Bezalel, also known as the Maharal. His work on the Pentateuch is entitled Gur Aryeh.
