= Cyril Domb =

British-Israeli physicist (1920–2012)

- ציריל דומב
- Born: 9 December 1920; London, UK
- Died: 15 February 2012 (aged 91); Jerusalem, Israel
- Education: Pembroke College, Cambridge
- Known for: Gillis–Domb–Fisher random walk Domb–Sykes plot
- Spouse: Shirley Galinsky
- Awards: Max Born Prize (1981)
- Scientific career
- Fields: Theoretical physics Critical phenomena
- Workplaces: Admiralty Signal Establishment; University of Cambridge; Oxford University; King's College London; Bar-Ilan University
- Thesis: Order-disorder statistics (1949)
- Doctoral advisor: Fred Hoyle
- Other academic advisors: Robert Stoneley
- Doctoral students: Jill Bonner; Michael Fisher; Basil Hiley; Renfrey Potts

Cyril Domb FRS (Hebrew: ציריל דומב; 9 December 1920 – 15 February 2012) was a British-Israeli theoretical physicist, best known for his lecturing and writing on the theory of phase transitions and critical phenomena of fluids. He was also known in the Orthodox Jewish world for his writings on science and Judaism.

== Early life ==
Domb was born on 9 December 1920, the fourth day of Hanukkah, in North London to a Hasidic Jewish family. His father, Yoel, who had shortened his name from Dombrowski to Domb, was a native of Warsaw, while his mother, Sarah, was from Oświęcim, Poland. He was given the Hebrew name of Yechiel. His father and grandfather paid for tutors to educate him in classical Jewish studies, and he also attended shiurim (Torah classes) given by Rabbi Eliyahu Eliezer Dessler to young men in a nearby synagogue.

Domb possessed both an excellent memory and skill in mathematics. At the age of 17 he won a scholarship to Pembroke College, Cambridge. He graduated with a degree in mathematics in 1941. He then joined the Admiralty Signal Establishment in Portsmouth as one of several young scientists working on developing radar systems during World War II. Until that point, radar operators were only able to determine the distance of an approaching object; Domb's group worked out a method for determining the height of an object as well.

After the war, Domb attended Cambridge University. He earned his PhD in 1949 with a doctoral thesis on "Order-Disorder Statistics". His doctoral advisor was Fred Hoyle.

== Academic career ==
Domb was a university lecturer in mathematics at Cambridge University between 1952 and 1954 and professor of theoretical physics at King's College London between 1954 and 1981. In the latter position, he became the youngest professor in London at that time.

In 1972 Domb began co-editing what would become a 20-volume series, Phase Transitions and Critical Phenomena, considered a classic in the field. After the death of his first co-editor, Melville S. Green, he worked with Joel Lebowitz.

== Science and Judaism ==
In the late 1950s, Domb helped found the British Association of Orthodox Jewish Scientists, based on the American model, and served as its president.

Domb began writing his views reconciling the apparent contradictions between science and Judaism in 1961, when The Jewish Chronicle of London asked him for a 1000-word article on how Jewish teachings accord with the Big Bang and Steady State cosmological theories. This article gained the attention of the Lubavitcher Rebbe, who began a correspondence with Domb and encouraged him to continue his efforts to show religious sceptics that there is no contradiction between science and such Torah concepts as the Genesis creation narrative and the Existence of God. Unlike the Rebbe, Domb gave credence to the theory of evolution, but held that this and other scientific theories were "only tentative summaries of our situation, whereas religion deals with what is right and what is wrong, and with many of the major driving forces in one's life". Domb went on to publish a collection of articles on science and religion in Challenge: Torah views on science and its problems (1976), which he co-edited with Rabbi Aryeh Carmell.

== Move to Israel ==
In 1981, at the age of 60, Domb took early retirement from Kings College and made aliyah to Israel, settling in the Bayit Vegan neighbourhood of Jerusalem. Between 1981 and 1989 he was professor of physics at Bar-Ilan University, boosting the prestige of the department and attracting leading physicists and students to it. In keeping with his interests in Torah study, he opened each staff meeting with a Dvar Torah (Torah thought), started a Daf Yomi shiur after afternoon prayers, and founded an academic journal, Journal of Torah and Scholarship. He was also a visiting professor at the University of Maryland, Yeshiva University, Hebrew University of Jerusalem, and Weizmann Institute of Science, and academic president of Machon Lev, the Jerusalem College of Technology.

In October 2011, the Journal of Statistical Physics published a tribute issue to Domb, commemorating his influence on the field of statistical physics.

== Personal ==
Domb married Shirley Galinsky in 1957; they had six children.

== Honors and awards ==
- Fellow of the Royal Society, 1977.
- Max Born Prize, 1981.

== Works ==
=== Selected scientific publications ===
- Domb, C. 1949. "Order-Disorder Statistics II. A two-dimensional model." Proc. Roy. Soc. A199: 199–221
- Domb, C. 1960. "On the Theory of Cooperative Phenomena. "Adv. Phys., Phil. Mag. S9: 149–361
- Domb, C. and Sykes, M.F. 1961. "Use of Series Expansions for the Ising Model Susceptibility and Excluded Volume Problem." J. Math. Phys. 2: 63–67
- Domb, C. and Green, M.S., Eds. 1972–1976. "Phase Transitions and Critical Phenomena," Vols. 1–6, London: Academic Press.
- Domb, C. and Lebowitz, J.L., Eds. 1983–2000. “Phase Transitions and Critical Behavior,” Vols. 6–20, London: Academic Press.
- The Critical Point: A historical introduction to the modern theory of critical phenomena. Taylor & Francis. 1996. ISBN 0-7484-0435-X. "advances in physics domb."

=== Torah works ===
- Memories of Kopul Rosen. Carmel College. 1970. ISBN 0-9501372-0-0.
- Challenge: Torah views on science and its problems. Association of Orthodox Jewish Scientists. 1976. ISBN 0-87306-174-8. (co-edited with Aryeh Carmell); 2nd edition published by Feldheim in 2000
- Domb, Cyril (1982). Maaser Kesafim: Giving a tenth to charity. Feldheim Publishers. ISBN 0-87306-304-X. (2nd edition published by Feldheim, 1982)

== See also ==
- Jewish views on evolution
- Prominent Orthodox Jewish physicists:
  - Nathan Aviezer
  - Herman Branover
  - Aryeh Kaplan
  - Yehuda (Leo) Levi
  - Alvin Radkowsky
  - Gerald Schroeder
