= Alvin Radkowsky =

American nuclear physicist (1915–2002)

Alvin Radkowsky (30 June 1915 – 17 February 2002) was an American nuclear physicist and chief scientist at U.S. Navy nuclear propulsion division. His work in the 1950s led to major advances in nuclear-ship technology and civilian use of nuclear power.

== Biography ==
Radkowsky was a native of Elizabeth, New Jersey. He studied electrical engineering at the City College of New York (B.S., 1935), and physics at George Washington University (M.S., 1941; advisor was Dr. Edward Teller), and at Catholic University (Ph.D. 1947; Thesis: "Temperature dependence of electron energy levels in solids") He married Annette Eisenberg in 1951. (Daughter, Gilah Chukat. Six grandchildren. Brother, Lawrence Radkowsky.) He moved to Israel in 1972, and lived in Ramat Chen. Radkowsky was an Orthodox Jew, a תלמיד חכם, finished Shas twice, and wrote several articles on miracles and science.

Radkowsky worked on nuclear reactors at the Argonne National Laboratory, in the 1930s, and also worked for the Singer sewing machine firm. He was a civilian nuclear physicist in the US Navy from 1938 to 1972, where he was chief scientist of the Bureau of Ships' nuclear propulsion division, and in which role he worked closely with Admiral Hyman G. Rickover. Radkowsky was also chief scientist in the U.S. Atomic Energy Commission (now Dept. of Energy), Office of Naval Reactors from 1950 to 1972. He taught nuclear engineering at Tel Aviv University (1972–1994), and at Ben Gurion University (1994–2002).

In 1979 Radkowsky founded New Power Technology in Israel. It was backed by Tel Aviv University and Ben Gurion University and also by Yitzhak Moda’i, the Israeli Energy Minister who said, “The Israeli Government is very pleased with the designation of New Power Technology to assist us in the development of Dr. Radkowsky’s progressive work in the field of nuclear energy []. This outstanding project would not only benefit Israel but all mankind.”

Feldhamer Capital was appointed by the Israeli Energy Ministry to commercialize New Power Technology following an agreement between the Energy ministry and the Universities of Tel Aviv and Ben Gurion where the research was conducted. The advisory committee and board of directors were a collection of the world's most famous Manhattan Project and Nobel Prize winning physicists, all willing to lend their names to this humane venture. Professor Edward Teller, father of the hydrogen bomb and founder of the Lawrence Livermore Laboratory, Nobel Prizewinner Professor Eugene Wigner of Princeton University, Dr. Alvin Radkowsky, Nobel Prizewinner Professor Hans Bethe of Cornell University and Professor Herbert Goldstein of Columbia University all lent their reputations to this venture. The initiative was halted after the 1986 Chernobyl accident put a stop to any interest in new nuclear designs, even though that very accident could never have occurred with the Radkowsky improvement.

In 1992, Radkowsky started what became Thorium Power Inc.(Nasdaq:LTBR). Thorium fueled reactors allow nations the capability to generate energy while preventing them from using spent fuels to produce nuclear weapons. He repeatedly insisted that continued use of uranium fuel would inevitably lead to nuclear terrorism. Thorium Power participated in the design of the thorium-based fuel to burn plutonium from old nuclear weapons. It is now being tested at the Kurchatov Institute in Moscow. The fuel RTF (Radkowsky Thorium Fuel) is named after him.

By 2014, long after the Kurchatov trial was expected to have produced results, none have apparently been published. Thorium Power Inc itself has changed its name to Lightbridge and seems to have lost interest in RTF.

=== Noted accomplishments ===
- Invented and refined methods to fuel a nuclear reactor that limited expensive reactor replacements.
- Key inventions in both naval propulsion and commercial nuclear power plants.
- Developed a process he called "burnable poison" using boron and other elements to control and prolong the reactions in naval reactor cores.
- Headed a design team that built the first full-scale civilian nuclear power station, the Shippingport Atomic Power Station plant (Shippingport, Pennsylvania).

=== Awards ===
- U.S. Navy's Distinguished Civilian Service Award.
- U.S. Navy's Meritorious Civilian Service Award.
- Elected in 1991 to the National Academy of Engineering.
- Fellow of the American Physical Society.
- Fellow of the American Nuclear Society.
- ANS Alvin M. Weinberg Medal for outstanding international technical and policy leadership in nuclear science and technology, 2001.

== See also ==
- Alvin M. Weinberg
- Modern day Orthodox Jewish views on evolution
- Prominent Orthodox-Jewish physicists:
  - Nathan Aviezer
  - Herman Branover
  - Cyril Domb
  - Aryeh Kaplan
  - Yehuda (Leo) Levi
  - Gerald Schroeder
