= Jewish views on evolution =

Jewish views on biological evolution

Jewish views on evolution includes a continuum of views about the theory of evolution, experimental evolution, the origin of life, the age of the universe, and theistic evolution.

== Classical rabbinic teachings ==
Biblical chronology indicates that God completed the creation of the world close to 6,000 years ago. This age is reflected in the chronology developed in a midrash, Seder Olam, but a literalist reading of the Book of Genesis is rare in Judaism. This age is attributed to the tanna Jose ben Halafta, and covers history from the creation of the universe to the construction of the Second Temple in Jerusalem. Dr. Gerald Schroeder interprets Nachmanides description of the 6 days of creation in conjunction with Einstein's relativistic view of time applied to the expansion of space-time to say that the 6 days of creation are 15.75 Billion years from our perspective.

Many modern rabbis believe that the world is older than 6,000 years. They believe such a view is needed to accept scientific theories, such as the theory of evolution. Rabbis who have this view base their conclusions on verses in the Talmud or in the midrash. For example:

- Several passages of midrash state that there was a "time system" (סדר זמנים) before the events in the first chapter of Genesis, and thus, that God created and destroyed various other "worlds" before this time.
- Nachmanides (1194–1270) writes: In the first day God created the energy (כח) "matter" (חומר) of all things, and then he was finished with the main creation. After that God created all other things from that energy.
- Some midrashim state that the "first week" of Creation lasted for extremely long periods of time.
- The Zohar states that at the time of Adam there were already many unrelated people living in the world, but the Torah chose to focus on one person living in one location.
- The Mishnah discusses a reputed creature known as Adne Sadeh (wild man-like creatures), and debates whether they should be categorized as humans or wild animals for the purpose of certain laws, implying that this creature is an intermediate form between humans and wild animals.

== Medieval rabbinic teachings ==
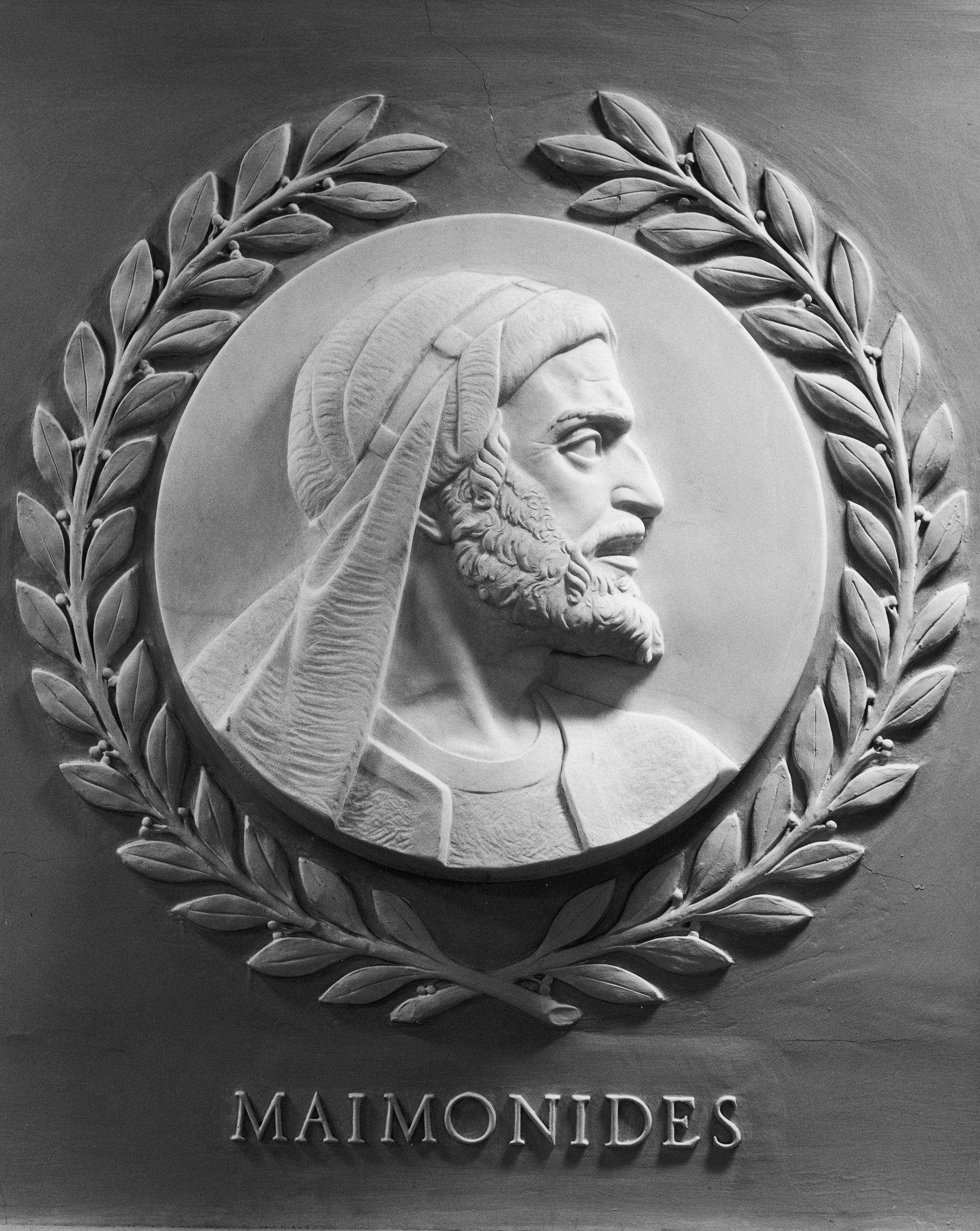
Sculpture of Maimonides in the U.S. House of Representatives.

=== Openness to non-literal interpretation ===
Some medieval philosophical rationalists, such as Maimonides and Gersonides held that not every statement in Genesis is meant literally. In this view, one was obligated to understand Torah in a way that was compatible with the findings of science. Indeed, Maimonides, one of the great rabbis of the Middle Ages, wrote that if science and Torah were misaligned, it was either because science was not understood or the Torah was misinterpreted. Maimonides argued that if science proved a point that did not contradict any fundamentals of faith, then the finding should be accepted and scripture should be interpreted accordingly. For example, in discussing Aristotle's view that the universe has existed literally forever, he argued that there was no convincing rational proof one way or the other, so that he (Maimonides) was free to accept, and therefore did accept, the literal biblical view that the universe came into being at a definite time; but that had Plato's theory been convincing enough with sufficient scientific proof he would have been able to reinterpret Genesis accordingly. With regard to Genesis, Maimonides stated that "the account given in scripture is not, as is generally believed, intended to be in all its parts literal." Later in the same paragraph, he specifically states that this applies to the text from the beginning to the account of the sixth day of creation.

Nachmanides, often critical of the rationalist views of Maimonides, pointed out (in his commentary to Genesis) several non-sequiturs stemming from a literal translation of the Bible's account of Creation, and stated that the account actually symbolically refers to spiritual concepts. He quoted the Mishnah in Tractate Hagigah which states that the actual meaning of the Creation account, mystical in nature, was traditionally transmitted from teachers to advanced scholars in a private setting.

A literal interpretation of the biblical Creation story among classic rabbinic commentators is uncommon. Thus Bible commentator Abraham ibn Ezra (11th century) wrote,

If there appears something in the Torah which contradicts reason…then here one should seek for the solution in a figurative interpretation…the narrative of the tree of knowledge of good and evil, for instance, can only be understood in a figurative sense.

Similarly, Saadiah Gaon wrote that Biblical verses should be interpreted non-literally if they contradict the senses or intellect.

One of several notable exceptions may be the Tosafist commentary on Tractate Rosh Hashanah, where there seems to be an allusion to the age of creation according to a literal reading of Genesis. The non-literal approach is accepted by many as a possible approach within Modern Orthodox Judaism and some segments of Haredi Judaism.

=== Specific interpretations of Genesis ===
Regarding the specifics of the Genesis story, Nahmanides suggested that God initially created man as a walking humanoid creature, and only afterwards instilled with this creature a human level of intelligence and understanding.

Rashi, while his commentary on the verses describing the days of creation teaches them as literal days, brackets his discussion of Genesis ch. 1 with comments stating that the entire world was created at once, with no duration of existence before Adam being specified.

=== Kabbalistic discussion of eras before Genesis ===
Many classic Kabbalistic sources mention Shmitot—cosmic cycles of creation, similar to the Indian concept of yugas. According to the tradition of Shmitot, Genesis talks openly only about the current epoch, while the information about the previous cosmic cycles is hidden in the esoteric reading of the text. Isaac ben Samuel of Acre (13th century), a prominent kabbalist and disciple of Nahmanides, calculated based on this theory that the Universe is about 15 billion years old. Since (he reasoned) shmitot existed before man was created, time before Adam and Eve must be measured in divine years, not human years. Psalm 90:4 says, "For a thousand years in thy sight are but like yesterday when it is past", thus one divine day equals 365,250 (assuming a 365.25-day year) human days. Like Livnat Ha-Sapir, he held that we are in the seventh shmita, each of which lasts 6000 years. Overall, then, Isaac calculated the age of the universe at Adam's creation to be 7 * 6000 * 365,250 = 15,340,500,000 years.

In his commentary on the Torah, Rabbi Bahya ben Asher (11th century, Spain) concludes that there were many time systems occurring in the universe long before the spans of history that man is familiar with. Based on the Kabbalah he calculates that the Earth is billions of years old.

== Jewish views in reaction to Darwin ==
With the advent of Charles Darwin's evolutionary theory, the Jewish community found itself engaged in a discussion of Jewish principles of faith and modern scientific findings.

=== Post-1800 Kabbalistic views of compatibility ===
Rabbi Elijah Benamozegh, an Italian Kabbalist, changed his position over time with respect to evolutionary theory. His views went through three stages, corresponding to his engagement with ideas of transmutation in three key works, namely, the Hebrew biblical commentary Em leMikra (1862–1865), the Italian theological treatise, Teologia Dogmatica e Apologetica (1877), and his posthumous great work in French, Israël et l'humanité (1914). Benamozegh came to view Darwin's account of the common descent of all life as evidence in support of kabbalistic teachings, which he synthesized to offer a majestic vision of cosmic evolution, with radical implications for understanding the development of morality and religion itself. In the context of the creation-evolution debate in Europe, Benamozegh's significance is as the earliest traditionalist Jewish proponent of a panentheistic account of evolution. From the time of his earliest work on the subject, he wrote that were evolution to become a mainstay of scientific theory, it would not contradict the Torah as long as one understood it as having been guided by God.

Rabbi Israel Lipschitz of Danzig (19th century) gave a famous lecture on Torah and paleontology, which is printed in the Yachin u-Boaz edition of the Mishnah, after Massechet Sanhedrin. He writes that Kabbalistic texts teach that the world has gone through many cycles of history, each lasting for many tens of thousands of years. He links these teachings to findings about geology from European, American and Asian geologists, and from findings from paleontologists. He discusses the wooly mammoth discovered in 1807 Siberia, Russia, and the remains of several then-famous dinosaur skeletons recently unearthed. Finding no contradiction between this and Jewish teachings, he states "From all this, we can see that all the Kabbalists have told us for so many centuries about the fourfold destruction and renewal of the Earth has found its clearest possible confirmation in our time."

=== Late 19th century Orthodox view of evolution ===
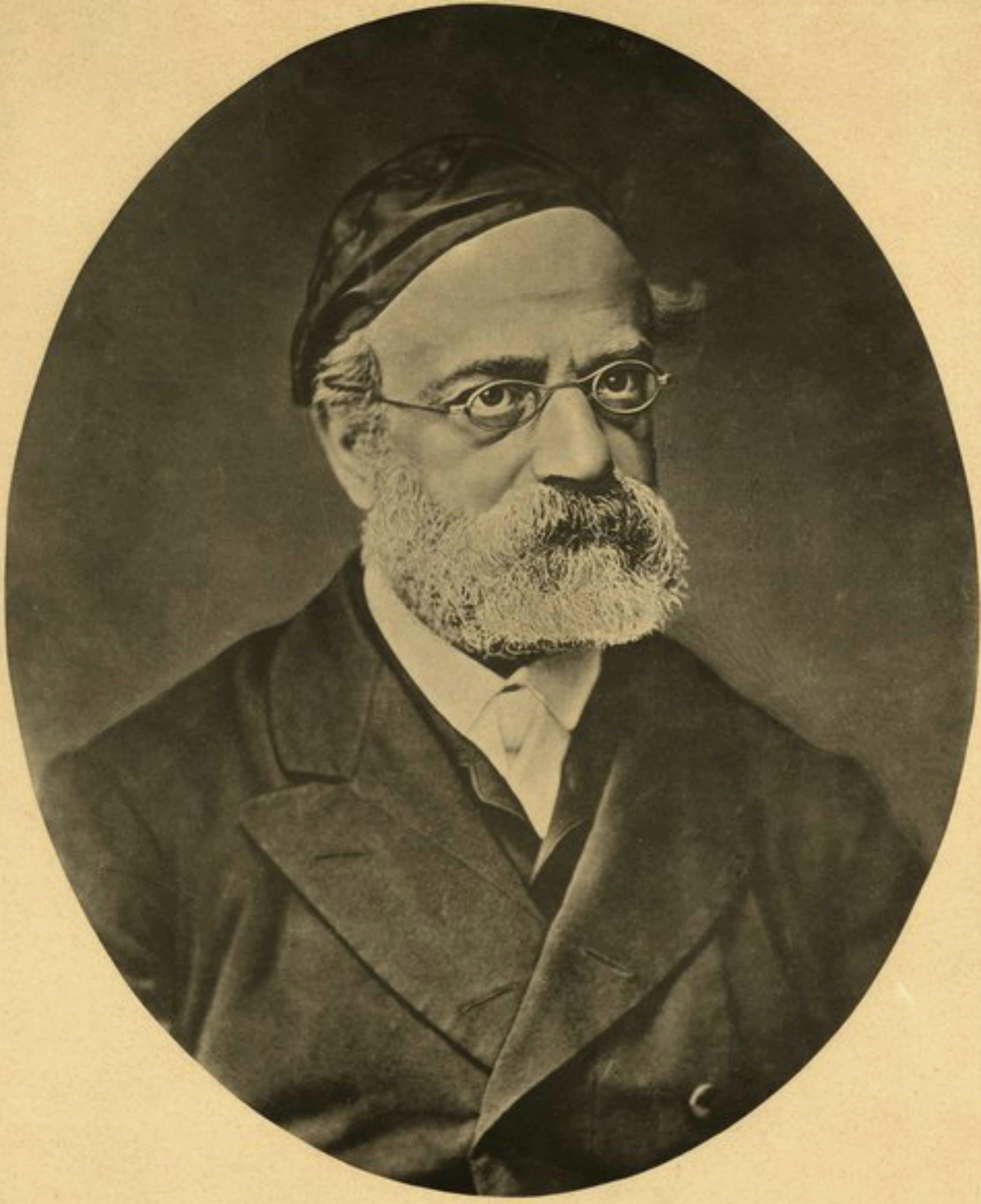
Samson Raphael Hirsch

In the late 1880s, Rabbi Samson Raphael Hirsch, an influential leader in the early opposition to non-Orthodox forms of Judaism, wrote that while he did not endorse the idea of common descent (that all life developed from one common organism), even if science ever did prove the factuality of Evolution, it would not pose a threat to Orthodox Judaism's beliefs. He posited that belief in evolution could instead cause one to be more reverent of God by understanding His wonders (a master plan for the universe).

This will never change, not even if the latest scientific notion that the genesis of all the multitudes of organic forms on earth can be traced back to one single, most primitive, primeval form of life should ever appear to be anything more than what it is today, a vague hypothesis still unsupported by fact. Even if this notion were ever to gain complete acceptance by the scientific world, Jewish thought, unlike the reasoning of the high priest of that notion, would nonetheless never summon us to revere a still extant representative of this primal form as the supposed ancestor of us all. Rather, Judaism in that case would call upon its adherents to give even greater reverence than ever before to the one, sole God Who, in His boundless creative wisdom and eternal omnipotence, needed to bring into existence no more than one single, amorphous nucleus and one single law of "adaptation and heredity" in order to bring forth, from what seemed chaos but was in fact a very definite order, the infinite variety of species we know today, each with its unique characteristics that sets it apart from all other creatures. (Collected Writings, vol. 7 pp. 263–264)

By the early to mid-1900s, the majority of Conservative Judaism and Reform Judaism came to accept the existence of evolution as a scientific fact. They interpreted Genesis and related Jewish teachings in light of this fact.

=== Late 19th century Reform views of evolution ===
The proponents of Reform or progressive forms of Judaism had consistently claimed since the early nineteenth-century that they sought to reconcile Jewish religion with the best of contemporary scientific thought. The science of evolution was arguably the scientific idea that drew the most sustained interest. A good example is the series of twelve sermons published as The Cosmic God (1876) by the founder of American Reform Judaism, Isaac Meyer Wise, who offered an alternative theistic account of transmutation to that of Darwinism, which he dismissed as "homo-brutalism". Other Reform rabbis who were more sympathetic to Darwinian conceptions of evolution were Kaufmann Kohler, Emil G. Hirsch, and Joseph Krauskopf. These engaged with high profile sceptics and atheists such as Robert Ingersoll and Felix Adler as well as with proponents of biological evolutionary theory, with the result that a distinctly panentheistic character of US Reform Jewish theology was observable. Emil G. Hirsch wrote:

In notes clearer than ever were entoned by human tongue does the philosophy of evolution confirm essential verity of Judaism’s insistent protest and proclamation that God is one. This theory reads unity in all that is and has been. Stars and stones, planets and pebbles, sun and sod, rock and river, leaf and lichen are spun of the same thread. Thus the universe is one soul, One spelled large. If throughout all visible form one energy is manifest and in all material shape one substance is apparent, the conclusion is all the better assured which holds this essentially one world of life to be the thought of one all embracing and all underlying creative directive mind. ... I, for my part, believe to be justified in my assurance that Judaism rightly apprehended posits God not, as often it is said to do, as an absolutely transcendental One. Our God is the soul of the Universe. ... Spinozism and Judaism are by no means at opposite poles.

Similarly, Joseph Krauskopf wrote:

According to our definition, God is the finitely, conceivable Ultimate, the Cause of all and the Cause in all, the Universal Life, the All-Pervading, All-Controlling, All-Directing Power Supreme, the Creator of the universe and the Governor of the same according to eternal and immutable laws by Him created. All existence is part of His existence, all life is part of His life, all intelligence is part of His intelligence, all evolution, all progress is part of His plan.

=== Late 19th and early 20th century Jewish evolutionary conceptions of Judaism ===
Lucien Wolf (1857–1930) was a celebrated journalist, diplomat, and communal authority, acting as a committee member of the conjoint committee of the Anglo-Jewish Association and the British Board of Deputies, the two representative bodies of Anglo-Jewry. He wrote "What is Judaism? A Question of To-day" in The Fortnightly Review (1884) in response to the biological-racist anti-Semitism of Goldwin Smith, and accepted Smith's premises (that the Jews were a biological race shaped by a religion that was, in its essence, merely legalism), with a strategy had been to attempt to reverse the value judgment. Wolf understood evolution in the strongly progressive sense that was common to much Victorian thought, with the environment selecting for traits that would maximize racial hygiene and permanently and continually improve the character of the Jewish race over time. Wolf asserted that "the optimism of Judaism" as "expressed in "legalism" gave Jews a 30% or 40% advantage over those of other religions and creeds, and not only explained their survival over the ages but actually represented an important moment in the story of human evolution. The "wisdom and power" of Judaism had enabled it to "accomplish of itself a distinct step in the history of the human species."

Joseph Jacobs (1854–1916) was a writer and social scientist appointed to Jewish Theological Seminary in New York towards the end of his life. He produced pioneering cross-disciplinary work in history, statistics, and race science, and was a student of anthropology at the Statistical Laboratory at University College London in the 1880s under the eugenicist Francis Galton. Jacobs was one for whom Judaism and Jewish identity made no sense apart from evolutionary thought. He offered an evolutionary account of Jewish history that suggested branching developments within the Jewish religion, and he explored the issue of Jewish race and peoplehood from both anthropological and sociological perspectives as a means by which to confront the anti-Semitic stereotypes of his day. He compiled measurements of skulls sizes, analyzed nose shapes, and carefully tabulated various vital statistics, wealth distribution, and even genius per capita in his application of the eugenic science of Galton, his tutor. For example, in attempting to explain the high number of children per Jewish family, Jacobs tentatively suggested that this could be explained by the relatively high frequency of marriages between cousins, which he hazarded were more fertile than mixed marriages. The high proportion of male births, which Jacobs noted that Darwin had commented upon in his Descent of Man, however exaggerated by poor statistics, nevertheless appeared to be "one of the few biostatical phenomena which seem to be distinctively racial." Despite this, Jacobs insisted that the over-arching framework and context for his pursuit of the quantitative science was always a qualitative historical one, and one might therefore argue that, as such, his work represents the first truly interdisciplinary answer to the question: what is a Jew?

Both Wolf and Jacobs presented Judaism as a case study for the investigation of the role of religion in human evolution, thereby humanizing and universalizing the Jew at the same time. Both men believed that by viewing Jewish religion through the prism of evolutionary theory they could construe Jewish difference in such a way as to counter the threat to assimilation posed by racial antisemitism.

=== Jewish views of Darwinism and the Holocaust ===
Mordecai Kaplan (1881–1983) and Hans Jonas (1903–1993) were two influential Jewish religious thinkers of the twentieth century who engaged seriously with scientific knowledge and, in particular, with Darwinism. The writings of two twentieth-century New York-based religious thinkers shared a common concern to find an alternative approach to the problem of evil in general and to the religious challenge of the Shoah in particular.

For Kaplan, the founder of Reconstructionist Judaism, it was possible to draw upon his already well-developed, scientifically augmented (or inspired) revisions of the Jewish religion and the Jewish God. Kaplan's writings from the 1930s onwards manifest an interest in evolution in at least four different although related contexts. First, evolution, in the sense of development or change, is used as a justification for Kaplan's reconstructionist project; Judaism is a living organism transforming and adapting to its changing environment. Second, evolution is presented as a divine process or principle that brings order out of chaos, in the sense of the volution of the cosmos. Third, the biological evolution of mankind. The evolution of plant and animal life, including human life, by means of Darwinian natural selection was a given, as far as Kaplan was concerned, although there is no doubt that in his mind natural selection was inadequate to explain human evolution in its entirety—or, at least, those aspects of human evolution that Kaplan was most interested in, namely, the ethics of a community. This led him to develop his theory of "spiritual selection," which added a complementary—and competing—force for selection to the mix of evolutionary pressures that shaped human evolution, including natural selection and sexual selection. Fourth, Kaplan discusses evolution in relation to what we would now call Social Darwinism, that is, the application of a theoretical framework for organic biology to human society, and in particular the Nazi theory of race competition. Kaplan, as one might expect, is hostile to such ideologies, but his key reason is that they threaten to undermine his understanding of humans as partners with the divine in bringing meaning and order to the universe.

For the philosopher of technology, Jonas, the revisions to the traditional categories of Jewish theology arguably followed from his struggle to make some kind of moral sense of the Holocaust in the light of his interest in the biological emergence of selfhood. For Jonas, Darwin's key contribution was to raise the value of non-human life: "The affront to human dignity posed by the [Darwinian] theory of man's descent from animals provoked outrage, but this reaction overlooked the fact that the same principle restored a degree of dignity to the phenomenon of life as a whole. If man is related to the animals, then the animals are also related to man and therefore, in degrees, possess that inwardness which man, their most highly advanced relative, is aware of in himself." In a 1968 essay entitled "The Concept of God After Auschwitz: A Jewish Voice" he envisions a God who, in the beginning and for unknowable reasons, had committed Himself to a cosmic experiment in "chance and risk and [the] endless variety of becoming." This God, who contained the cosmos but was not to be identified with it, as is made explicit in an earlier version, had created it by establishing the physical and biological laws that unfolded over time and space without any divine direction or correction and without foreknowledge of how it would develop. The cosmos was left to itself, to play out according to natural laws and probability, with God having withdrawn Himself completely from the process. Following the surprising emergence of life (described as "the world accident for which the becoming deity had waited"), blind evolutionary forces had eventually generated the human mind with its capacity for "knowledge and freedom," that is, for moral choice. The dead cosmos became the living cosmos, and the living cosmos became the moral cosmos. With the human, the organism had moved beyond existence-for-its-own-sake to existence-for-the-sake-of-others, that is, an existence premised upon responsibility for others and for the cosmos itself, which had given birth to life and morality (as he puts it: "self-fulfilling life has given way to the charge of responsibility"). According to this account, God had found a partner in creation, in that the universe would no longer develop only according to the amoral natural laws by which He had established it, but could be radically altered by the self-aware, self-determined actions of humans, whether these deeds took place in ethical or material dimensions. To the extent that God was to be regarded as the ground of all being, containing the cosmos within Himself, those human deeds that shaped the world also affected God: "In the awesome impact of his deeds on God's destiny … lies the immortality of man." By the time Jonas arrives at a consideration of the Holocaust, he is able to explain God's silence at Auschwitz as the necessary consequence of the Creator's absence from His creation.

At the heart of the visions of both Kaplan and Jonas was a kind of cosmic evolutionism that necessitated an understanding of the origins of human ethics from an evolutionary perspective. While neither could be said to have demonstrated an intimate understanding of Darwinian theory, both viewed themselves as critically engaged with it and sought to utilize Darwin in offering accounts of a genocidal world that were neither entirely naturalistic nor entirely supernatural.

=== Modern-day Orthodox Jewish views ===
The Rabbinical Council of America (RCA) has "maintained that evolutionary theory, properly understood, is not incompatible with belief in a Divine Creator, nor with the first 2 chapters of Genesis." Prominent Orthodox rabbis who have affirmed that the world is older, and that life has evolved over time include Israel Lipschitz, Sholom Mordechai Schwadron (the MaHaRSHaM) (1835–1911), Zvi Hirsch Chajes (1805–1855) and Abraham Isaac Kook (1865–1935). (Kook was interested in evolution partly as a bridge between religious and secular Zionists.) These rabbis proposed their own versions of theistic evolution, in which the world is older, and that life does evolve over time in accord with natural law, painting natural law as the process by which God drives the world.

There is, in parallel, a discussion on this subject by scientists in the Orthodox Jewish community. One of the most prominent is Gerald Schroeder, an MIT trained physicist. He has written a number of articles and popular books attempting to reconcile Jewish theology with modern scientific findings that the world is billions of years old and that life has evolved over time. His work has received approbations from a number of Orthodox rabbinic authorities. Other physicists writing on this topic include Alvin Radkowsky, Nathan Aviezer, Herman Branover, Cyril Domb, Aryeh Kaplan and Yehuda (Leo) Levi.

Various popular works, citing an array of classical, Orthodox views, attempt to reconcile traditional Jewish texts with modern scientific findings concerning evolution, the age of the Earth and the age of the Universe; these include:

- Nathan Aviezer: In the Beginning, Biblical Creation and Science; Fossils and Faith: Understanding Torah and Science
- Aryeh Carmell and Cyril Domb, ed.: Challenge: Torah Views on Science and Its Problems
- Daniel E. Friedmann: The Genesis One Code: Demonstrates a clear alignment between the times of key events described in the Genesis with those derived from scientific observation. and The Broken Gift: Harmonizing the Biblical and scientific accounts of human origins
- Aryeh Kaplan: Immortality, Resurrection and the Age of the Universe: A Kabbalistic View
- Yehuda Levi: Torah and Science - Their Interplay in the World Scheme
- Jonathan Sacks: The Great Partnership: God, Science and the Search For Meaning
- Gerald Schroeder: Genesis and the Big Bang: The Discovery of Harmony Between Modern Science and the Bible; The Science of God
- Natan Slifkin: The Challenge of Creation

=== Modern-day Conservative Jewish views ===
Conservative Judaism embraces science as a way to learn about the world, and, like Modern Orthodox and Reform Judaism, has not found the theory of evolution a challenge to traditional Jewish theology. The Conservative Jewish movement has not yet developed one official response to the subject, but a broad array of views has converged. Conservative Jews teach that God created the universe and is responsible for the creation of life within it, but proclaims no mandatory teachings about how this occurs.

Many Conservative rabbis embrace the term theistic evolution, and reject the term intelligent design. Conservative rabbis who use the term intelligent design in their sermons often distinguish their views from the Christian use of the term. Like most in the scientific community, they understand "intelligent design" to be a technique by Christians to insert religion into public schools, as admitted in the Intelligent design movement's "wedge strategy".

The Central Conference of American rabbis is opposed to the teaching of creationism in public schools, as is the Rabbinical Assembly.

Conservative Judaism strongly supports the use of science as the proper way to learn about the physical world in which we live, and thus encourages its adherents to find a way to understand evolution in a way that does not contradict the findings of scientific research. The tension between accepting God's role in the world and the findings of science, however, is not resolved, and a wide array of views exists. Some mainstream examples of Conservative Jewish thought are as follows:

Professor Ismar Schorsch, former chancellor of the Jewish Theological Seminary of America, writes that:

The Torah's story of creation is not intended as a scientific treatise, worthy of equal time with Darwin's theory of evolution in the curriculum of our public schools. The notes it strikes in its sparse and majestic narrative offer us an orientation to the Torah's entire religious worldview and value system. Creation is taken up first not because the subject has chronological priority but rather to ground basic religious beliefs in the very nature of things. And I would argue that their power is quite independent of the scientific context in which they were first enunciated.

Rabbi David J. Fine, who has authorized official responsa for the Conservative movement's Committee on Jewish Law and Standards, expresses a common Conservative Jewish view on the subject:

Conservative Judaism has always been premised on the total embrace of critical inquiry and science. More than being compatible with Conservative Judaism, I would say that it is a mitzvah to learn about the world and the way it works to the best of our abilities, since that is to marvel with awe at God's handiwork. To not do so is sinful.
But here's where the real question lies. Did God create the world, or not? Is it God's handiwork? Many of the people who accept evolution, even many scientists, believe in what is called "theistic evolution," that is, that behind the billions of years of cosmic and biological evolution, there is room for belief in a creator, God, who set everything into motion, and who stands outside the universe as the cause and reason for life. The difference between that and "intelligent design" is subtle yet significant. Believing scientists claim that belief in God is not incompatible with studying evolution since science looks only for the natural explanations for phenomena. The proponents of intelligent design, on the other hand, deny the ability to explain life on earth through solely natural explanations. That difference, while subtle, is determinative.
David J. Fine, Intelligent Design

Rabbi Michael Schwab writes:

...the Jewish view on the first set of questions is much closer to the picture painted by adherents to intelligent design than to those who are strict Darwinians. Judaism, as a religion, and certainly Conservative Judaism, sees creation as a purposeful process directed by God, however each individual defines the Divine. This is clearly in consonance with the theory of Intelligent Design. What Darwin sees as random, we see as the miraculous and natural unfolding of God’s subtle and beautiful plan.
...However, as unlikely as it may seem, this does not mean for one moment that Judaism’s view rejects wholesale the veracity of Darwin’s theory. In fact, I believe that it is easy to incorporate Darwin and Intelligent design into a meaningful conception of how we humans came into being...
We have frameworks built into our system to integrate the findings of science into our religious and theological beliefs. That is because we believe that the natural world, and the way it works, was created by God and therefore its workings must be consistent with our religious beliefs.
...One of the most well known ways our tradition has been able to hold onto both the scientific theory of evolution as well as the concept of a purposeful creation was by reading the creation story in Genesis in a more allegorical sense. One famous medieval commentary proclaims that the days of creation, as outlined in the book of Bereshit, could be seen as representative of the stages of creation and not literal 24 hour periods. Thus each biblical day could have accounted for thousands or even millions of years. In that way the progression according to both evolution and the Torah remains essentially the same: first the elements were created, then the waters, the plants, the animals, and finally us. Therefore, Genesis and Darwin can both be right in a factual analysis even while we acknowledge that our attitudes towards these shared facts are shaped much more strongly by the Torah – we agree how the process unfolded but disagree that it was random.
Parshat Noah -- November 4, 2005, How Did We Get Here? Michael Schwab

The claim that evolution is purposeful is in conflict with modern-day evolutionary theory. The precise way in which God inserts design is not specified by Schwab or other rabbis.

Rabbi Lawrence Troster is a critic of positions such as this. He holds that much of Judaism (and other religions) have not successfully created a theology which allows for the role of God in the world and yet is also fully compatible with modern-day evolutionary theory. Troster maintains that the solution to resolving the tension between classical theology and modern science can be found in process theology, such as in the writings of Hans Jonas, whose view of an evolving God within process philosophy contains no inherent contradictions between theism and scientific naturalism.

Lecture God after Darwin: Evolution and the Order of Creation October 21, 2004, Lishmah, New York City, Larry Troster

In a paper on Judaism and environmentalism, Troster writes:

Jonas is the only Jewish philosopher who has fully integrated philosophy, science, theology and environmental ethics. He maintained that humans have a special place in Creation, manifest in the concept that humans are created in the image of God. His philosophy is very similar to that of Alfred North Whitehead, who believed that God is not static but dynamic, in a continual process of becoming as the universe evolves.
From Apologetics to New Spirituality: Trends in Jewish Environmental Theology, Lawrence Troster

== Jewish opposition to Darwinian theory ==
Whilst the Reform, Conservative and Modern Orthodox movements have stated that they feel there is not a conflict between evolutionary theory and the teachings of Judaism, some Haredi rabbis have remained staunchly opposed to certain teachings in evolutionary theory. In contrast with the literalist biblical interpretation of some Christian creationists, they express an openness to multiple interpretations of Genesis, through Jewish oral tradition and Jewish mysticism. They have also expressed an openness to evolutionary theory in biology, except where they perceive that it is in conflict with the Torah's account of creation.

Rabbi Avigdor Miller, a highly revered American Haredi rabbi of the Lithuanian Yeshivah Tradition, who was also highly respected in Hasidic communities such as Satmar, was strongly opposed to the theory of evolution, and wrote strong polemics against evolution in several of his books, as well as speaking about this subject often in his popular lectures, taking a Creationist position. Several selections from his books on this subject were collected in a pamphlet he published in 1995 called "The Universe Testifies".

Rabbi Menachem Mendel Schneerson, the Rebbe of the worldwide movement of Lubavitcher or Chabad Hasidism, was avidly opposed to evolution, and his following remains committed to that position.

Rabbi Avi Shafran, a spokesman for Agudath Israel, writes a weekly column that is widely syndicated in the Jewish press. As an opponent of Darwinian evolutionary theory, Shafran is careful to distinguish the Jewish perspective from that of Christian fundamentalism. He writes, "An unfortunate side-effect of our affirmation of purpose in creation at a time of controversy is the assumption made by some that we believing Jews share some other groups’ broader skepticism of science. But while Torah-faithful Jews reject the blind worship of science, we do not regard science as an enemy." Quite the contrary, Shafran remarks, Judaism seeks to learn as much as possible from God's creation.

Shafran also rejects the literalism of Christian fundamentalism. He writes, "Nor is 'Biblical literalism' a Jewish approach. Many are the p’sukim (verses) that do not mean what a simple reading would yield." To Shafran, the Jewish oral tradition is the key to the true meaning of the Torah's words. "There are multiple levels of deeper meanings inaccessible to most of us. The words of Breishis (Genesis, Ashkenazi Hebrew) and the Midrashim thereon hide infinitely more than they reveal. It is clear that the Torah describes the creation of the universe as the willful act of HaKodosh Boruch Hu (the Holy One), and describes creation as having unfolded in stages. But details are hardly provided."

Some contemporary Orthodox Jews writers are concerned that if evolution is accepted as true, then it could lead to the Torah being deemed not only irrelevant but also false. Rabbi Dovid Gottlieb has argued that for Jews accepting evolution is equivalent to accepting atheism. The Israeli microbiologist Morris Goldman has written that Darwinism is a problem for Judaism, since Darwinism makes god irrelevant. Other issues are that evolution can provide a non religious basis for the development of morality, and it removes the idea that humans are qualitatively different from other animals.

=== Slifkin affair ===
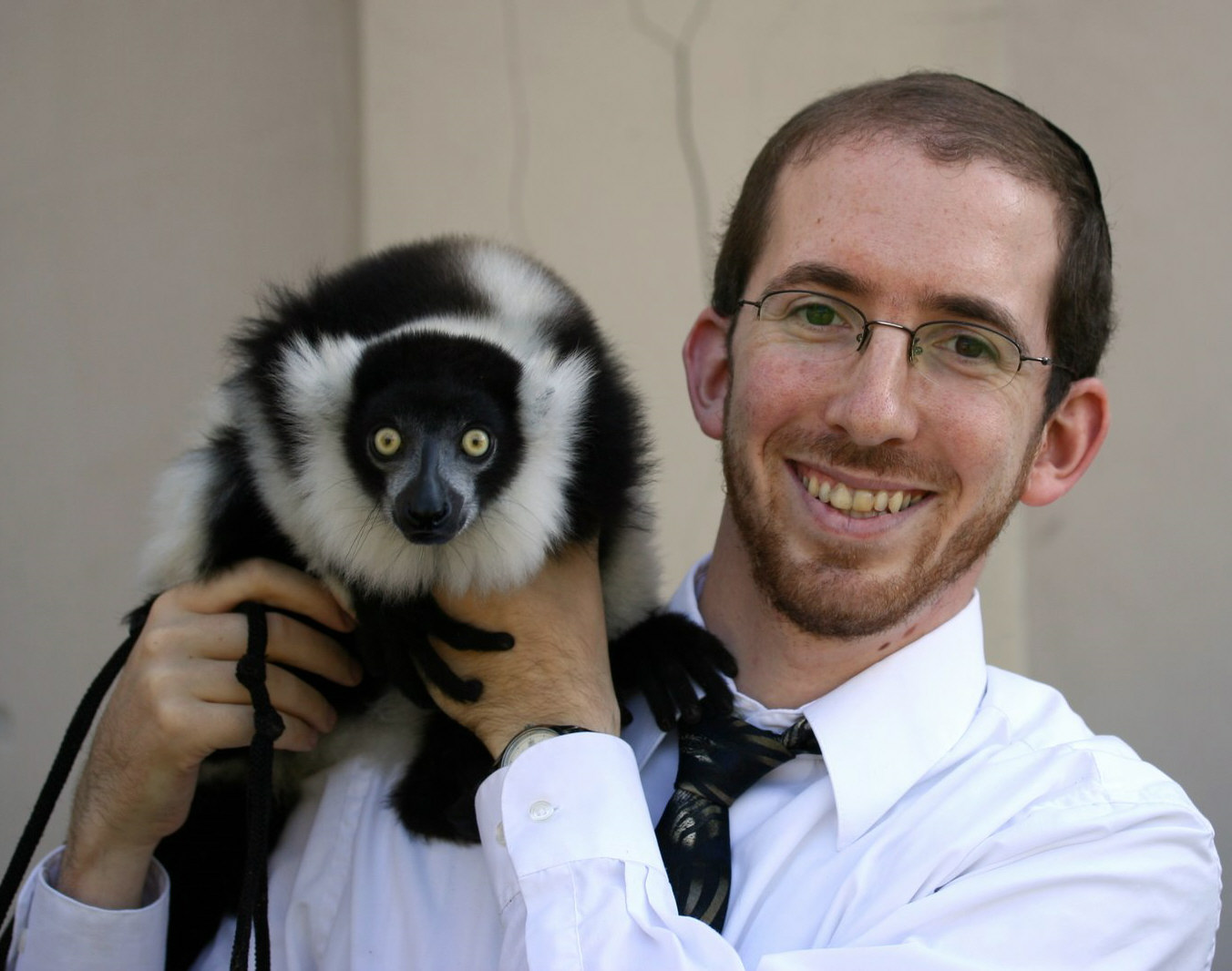
Rabbi Natan Slifkin

In 2004-2005, three popular books by Rabbi Natan Slifkin (sometimes pronounced Nosson Slifkin) were banned by a group of Haredi rabbinic authorities on the grounds that they were heretical. Known to his admirers as the "Zoo Rabbi," Nosson Slifkin was the author of The Torah Universe, a series of books on science and religion that were widely read in Orthodox communities until they were suddenly banned. "The books written by Nosson Slifkin present a great stumbling block to the reader," the ban declared. "They are full of heresy, twist and misrepresent the words of our sages and ridicule the foundations of our emunah (faith)." The ban, which prohibited Jews from reading, owning, or distributing Slifkin's books, prompted a widespread backlash in the Orthodox Jewish community.

Jennie Rothenberg, reporting on this ban in the secular Jewish journal, Moment, asserted that the incident represents a major breaking point within ultra-Orthodox society. Rothenberg interviewed several rabbis who wished to remain anonymous. According to one of them, "Over the past 15 years, the rabbis of Bnai Brak and the more open American ultra-Orthodox rabbis have been split on a number of important policy decisions. The Slifkin ban is a huge break. It’s a kind of power struggle, and those who didn’t sign the ban are outraged right now. I’m talking about rabbis with long white beards who are furious about it." Slifkin's views, according to this rabbi, are shared by countless figures within the ultra-Orthodox community. "He’s saying out loud what a lot of people have been talking about quietly all along. To those people, he’s a kind of figurehead."

=== Orthodox scientists respond to Darwin ===
Several Modern Orthodox Jewish scientists have interpreted creation in light of both modern scientific findings and rabbinical interpretations of Genesis. Each of these scientists have claimed that modern science actually confirms a literal interpretation of Torah. All of them accept the scientific evidence that the age of the Earth and the age of the universe are on a scale of billions of years, and all of them acknowledge that the diversity of species on Earth can be explained through an evolutionary framework. However, each of them interprets certain aspects of evolution or the emergence of modern humans as a divine process, rather than a natural one. Thus, each of them accepts an evolutionary paradigm, while rejecting some aspects of Darwinism. Shai Cherry writes, "While twentieth century Jewish theologians have tended to compartmentalize science and the Torah, our Modern Orthodox physicists synthesized them.

- Nathan Aviezer, a physicist who trained at the University of Chicago, allows for divine guidance within an evolutionary paradigm in the transmutation of species over time, including the emergence of modern man from Homo erectus. As a physicist, he interprets the six days of creation as broadly referring to large periods of time, an interpretation for which he cites rabbinic sources, including Maimonides and Nachmanides. For Aviezer, the evolutionary framework applies, except where the Hebrew verb bara (create) is used. To Aviezer, "It is particularly meaningful that Modern Man is intellectually and culturally so vastly superior to his closest relative, the extinct Neanderthal Man, even though both species are very similar." He explains this through a literal interpretation of Genesis 1:27 — "And God created Man in His image."
- Gerald Schroeder, an MIT trained physicist, believes that modern science contains nothing inimical to a literal reading of Genesis. Indeed, modern science allows one to understand the "true literal meaning of the Creation narrative." To Schroeder, it is Einstein's relativity, the "distortion of time facing backwards in a forward rushing cosmos", that accounts for the compression of time in a 15-billion year-old universe into six days of creation. To Schroeder, the emergence of modern man can be dated to the beginning of writing. Archeologists date the first writing, he notes, "at five or six thousand years ago, the exact period that the Bible tells us the soul of Adam, the neshama, was created." To Schroeder, who cites the Targum of Onkelos, Adam was the first man who could write, and the creation of Adam from more primitive man was a divine ensoulment.
- Judah Landa, a physicist and teacher at, among other institutions, the Yeshiva of Flatbush, takes a completely different approach. To Landa, genetic mutation is not a random process, but a divinely guided one that only appears random to humanity. "Evolution was designed and guided, just as the putting together of words and sentences into book forms is accomplished only by design and guidance. A book is designed by its author, evolution was (and continues to be) designed by the laws of nature (which in turn, were designed, we believe, by God). Where Landa differs from Darwin is in his rejection of the Darwinian notion that evolution has no purpose. Landa does not claim that there is proof of a final purpose for life; he merely asserts that science cannot rule one out. He writes, "God may very well have designed the laws of the universe and the earliest forms of matter and energy with particular life-forms as end-products in mind. Evolution and natural selection may be the vehicles he chose and designed to achieve His purposes." Like Aviezar and Schroeder, Landa reconciles science with the biblical account of Genesis, taken literally, but he does so through literary interpretation.

Shai Cherry, Professor of Jewish Thought at Vanderbilt University, remarks that these Modern Orthodox scientists have rejected the approach taken by Jewish theologians. Theologians have tended to use later writings, such as Midrash and Kabbalah, to reconcile modern science with Genesis. The Orthodox scientists, by comparison, have largely ignored Jewish theology, in favor of a fundamentalist and literalist interpretation of Genesis. Yet in their writings, each of them seeks to reconcile science with Genesis. Cherry speculates, "They were targeting an American Jewish community that privileges science over Torah as a source of scientific knowledge. If Genesis could be shown to have anticipated Darwin or Einstein, then the Bible would regain an aura of truth that it had been losing since the advent of biblical criticism and modern science."

According to Cherry, the books of Aviezar, Schroeder, and Landa have each sought to strengthen Orthodox Jewry in a time of mounting secularization. Aviezar and Schroeder sought to prove that Genesis anticipates the findings of modern science, and thus increase its status. By contrast, Landa sought to remove a barrier to Orthodox commitment, by proving to secular Jews that Orthodox Judaism and modern science are compatible. At the same time, he sought to persuade students in his own Orthodox community that the study of science is not incompatible with commitment to Orthodoxy.

Nathan Robertson a researcher in Biophysics has also released a book titled "The First Six Days" which claims to reconcile the scientific theory of the beginnings of the universe and life with the biblical account of creation. Rabbinical sources are cited from Nachmanides (Ramban) and Rashi along with kabbalistic interpretations of Genesis. Nathan reconciles Darwinian evolution with the biblical account and states that at deeper levels of understanding of the biblical text and of scientific theory, the two worlds overlap. "As one studies science to deeper levels and also tries to study Bereshis [Genesis] to deeper levels, both principles begin to converge on each other."

== Jewish reactions to intelligent design ==
The movement for intelligent design claims that an intelligent creator is responsible for the origin of life and of humankind, and rejects evolution. Jewish theologians, organizations, and activists have maintained that intelligent design is a pseudoscientific religious concept. Although some have expressed support for a theistic interpretation of evolution, they have generally rejected the tenets of the intelligent design movement. To Rabbi Brad Hirschfield, President of the National Jewish Center for Learning and Leadership, intelligent design is "their attempt to confirm what they already believe." Jewish organizations in the United States have been steadfast in their opposition to the teaching of intelligent design in public schools, charging that to do so would violate the separation of church and state.

== See also ==
- Relationship between religion and science
- The Challenge of Creation
- Association of Orthodox Jewish Scientists

== Sources ==
- Abrams, Nancy Ellen, and Joel R. Primack. "In a Beginning...: Quantum Cosmology and Kabbalah." Tikkun, Vol. 10, No. 1, p. 66-73.
- Aviezer, Nathan. In the Beginning: Biblical Creation and Science. Ktav, 1990. ISBN.
- Carmell, Aryeh, and Cyril Domb (editors). Challenge: Torah Views on Science New York: Association of Orthodox Jewish Scientists/Feldheim Publishers, 1976. ISBN
- Cantor, Geoffrey and Marc Swetlitz, (editors). Jewish Tradition and the Challenge of Darwinism. University of Chicago Press. 2006. ISBN 978-0-226-09276-8
- Cherry, Shai. "Crisis management via Biblical Interpretation: Fundamentalism, Modern Orthodoxy, and Genesis." in Geoffrey Cantor and Marc Swetlitz (editors) Jewish Tradition and the Challenge of Darwinism. University of Chicago Press (2006)
- Kaplan, Aryeh. Immortality, Resurrection, and the Age of the Universe: A Kabbalistic View. Ktav, 1993.
- Langton, Daniel R. Reform Judaism and Darwin: How Engaging with Evolutionary Theory shaped American Jewish Religion. De Gruyter, 2019. ISBN 3110659131
- Schroeder, Gerald L. The Science of God: The Convergence of Scientific and Biblical Wisdom. Broadway Books, 1998.
- Slifkin, Natan. The Challenge of Creation: Judaism's Encounter with Science, Cosmology and Evolution, Yashar Books (2006)
- Tigay, Jeffrey H. "Genesis, Science, and 'Scientific Creationism.'" Conservative Judaism, Vol. 40(2), Winter 1987/1988, p. 20-27.
- Robertson, Nathan. "The First Six Days". Pneumasprings, 2007.The First Six Days
- Aish.com Rabbi Weinberg "Kosher but controversial"
