= Branover =

Branover is a Jewish surname. Notable people with the name include:

- David Stitchkin Branover, Chilean attorney and University President
- Herman Branover, Russian-Israeli author and publisher
- Rami Bar-Niv, Pianist/composer/author, is a family relative of Herman Branover. He Hebraized his last name from 'Branover' to 'Bar-Niv' in 1960.
