= SATEC =

- Type: Privately held company
- Industry: Power Metering, Power Quality Analysis, Energy Management
- Founded: 1987; 39 years ago in Jerusalem, Israel
- Headquarters: Jerusalem, Israel
- Key people: Herman Branover (Founder); Daniel Branover (Chairman); Shlomo Olidort (CEO)
- Website: www.satec-global.com

SATEC is a developer and manufacturer of power measurement and power quality monitoring equipment. The company's range of products includes traditional 3-phase power meters for real-time power measurement and data-logging, revenue meters (electricity meters), power quality analyzers and a software suite for energy management and billing.

With headquarters in Jerusalem, Israel and subsidiaries in Union, New Jersey and in PRC, SATEC is a privately owned company.

== History ==
SATEC was first founded in 1987 as a technological business incubator by Prof. Herman Branover. Inspired by the Lubavitcher Rebbe, who predicted a wave of Jewish immigration from the Soviet Union, following perestroika, his aim was to create jobs in a fitting technological environment for these immigrants, of which many were highly educated. Soon after, SATEC started focusing on power metering and developing expertise in this field.

The underlying idea was to demonstrate a financially viable approach to the absorption of the mentioned immigrants, proving it as a profitable enterprise beyond just a social project. An acronym, SATEC stands for Shamir Advanced Technological Engineering Company, affiliated with Shamir, which was an earlier social enterprise created by Prof. Branover. Originally located in the Jerusalem Clal Center, SATEC was initially composed of 3 small divisions: one working on electro-mechanical solutions, headed by Prof. Mendel Krichevsky (who later received a lifetime achievement award from the Society of Electrical and Electronics Engineers in Israel), a group developing software solutions, headed by Prof. Yaakov Friedman, and a third group specializing in hydrometallurgy, led by Dr. Solomon Flaks. At this primary stage SATEC consisted of no more than 15 employees.

Initial funding came from the mining industry, which had vested interest in developing novel hydrometallurgical solutions for the processing and smelting of gold out of ores of low gold content.

Two years after, SATEC was already in its current location in Har Hotzvim, Jerusalem's Hi-tech industrial park.

Branover's son, Daniel, and Shlomo Olidort have been jointly managing the company as chief executive officer and managing director, since the company's founding.

In 1991, SATEC opened a subsidiary developing solutions for industrial heating.

Today, SATEC is a global company, with U.S. offices in Union, NJ, catering to the Americas and a subsidiary in Beijing (SATEC China) catering to the Chinese market. SATEC operates in over 60 countries and has dedicated recognized self-branded SATEC partners in several of them. For the Russian market and Indian market, SATEC's partners have established local assembly lines to facilitate logistics and specificity of local demand.

=== Power Metering and Power Quality Analysis ===
The company pioneered the field of digital power metering. At a time in which energy metering was strictly analog, SATEC was one of the first handful of companies to develop a digital multifunction power-meter. From there, the products developed to include power quality analyzers and different control solutions for the power industry, with a focus on electric utilities and related solutions.

=== SATEC Labs and R&D ===
SATEC engineers specialize in a variety of fields and applications. These range from signal processing through standard testing for accuracy and durability, along with implementation of different communication protocols.

Over the years, a variety of applications have been investigated, developed, and implemented in the SATEC labs. Examples are fault detection, location and recording, Phasor Measurement Unit (per IEEE C37.118-2005) for wide-area monitoring of frequency and different adjustments for precision of parameter reading and calculation.

The SATEC calibration lab is ISO 17025 certified for accuracy testing.

=== Historical Products ===
==== PM288-296 ====
The idea behind these first products was to design what later on would be referred to in the industry as a “smart panel”, which implies connectivity and transmission of breaker status and power parameters and enabling control of loads via remotely operated relays. This was designed at a very early stage of the concept. As the base and means for a smart panel there was a need for a smart meter.

Released in 1989, The PM288 measured and displayed 3 voltages, 3 currents and three-phase power parameters (P, Q, S). At an age when communications and connectivity were scarce in industrial control, the idea of an operator being able to view these parameters remotely was a novel concept. This first panel-meter was designed as a robust product, featuring serial communication and full galvanic transformer isolation. Galvanic isolation was also implemented in several following products such as the PM17X, implemented in the Volzhskaya TGK-7 power stations (Samara, Ul'yanovsk, Saratov, Orenburg region) as part of a tele-mechanic system.

The first clients for these meters were the Israeli Dead Sea Works, The Bromine industrial plant (later known as “Bromine Compounds” until its consolidation with ICL) and Nesher Israel Cement Enterprises, where these meters provide reading till today (September 2020).

Shortly after, SATEC released the PM296. This product allowed all above functionality including paging between parameters, which now included demands and monitoring of voltage and current harmonics till the 40th harmonic. This unit was equipped with a 4th current input for detection of leakage currents and featured load shedding functionality.

Employing active (compensated) current transformers, the meters were able to reach what was considered at that time as the exceptionally high accuracy of Class 0.2S (per IEC 62053-22).

==== Additional Legacy Instruments ====
The next family of products to be introduced during the beginning of this millennium was the 13X series, which is still available today and which includes SATEC's most popular meter, the PM130. The 13X family consists of Class 0.5S/0.2S (per IEC 62053-22) energy meters, all of very similar features. EM132 and EM133 as DIN-rail mount and PM130 and PM135 as panel mount. The meters are programmable for setting triggers for event recording or relay activation etc.

The 13X series shares a variety of exchangeable modules which act as add-on cards to the meters, housing up to 16 digital and analog I/Os, communication options such as cellular modem and Profibus port.

== Technology ==
=== Substation Automation and Retrofit ===
Globally, a large number of electrical substations still operate on what is known as legacy systems, thus dubbed legacy substations. This implies the lack of modern communication infrastructure and subsequent control capabilities.

The primary challenge in these substations is integrating them into the communication network of the utility's dispatch and control platform, for polling power data and supplying them with minimal control capabilities for basic actions such as tripping breakers or switching transformers. The term widely used in this context, with reference to such upgrades is retrofit. The retrofit challenge is to provide as much monitoring and control possible, based on the existing legacy infrastructure. With this need in mind, of bundling metering, control and communications, SATEC had developed many of its products, equipping them all with cellular communication modules designed for either extremely remote locations or in case of absence of local area networks for any other reason.

==== SA300 / PM180 ====
SA300, also known as ezPAC, was designed to monitor legacy substations or transformers where mechanical protection relays are in service. Monitoring both breaker status and power parameters, including a precise time-stamp provides what is known as Sequence of Events recording. This is a way of monitoring the activity of protection relays, ensuring that they came into action promptly when needed, such as in the case of fault currents, and that they do not respond prematurely in other cases.

The analyzer was designed to modularly house up to 5 additional add-on cards, such as digital and analog I/Os, extra current inputs for recording fault-currents, or extra communication ports.

In 2020 the PM180 was submitted as a solution to include fault recording and PMU application in a tender issued by the Israeli Electric Company, a proposal which ultimately won the tender

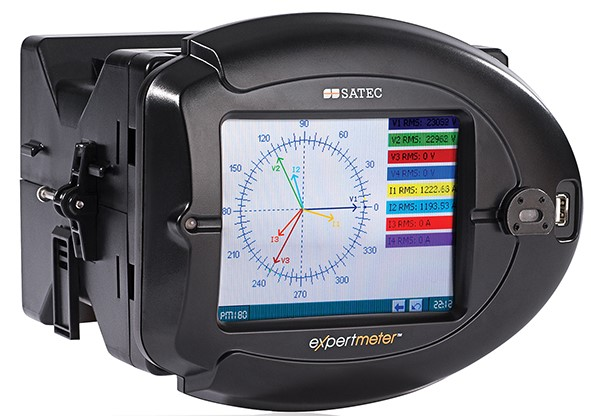
PM180 Power Quality Analyzer with RGM Screen

==== Branch Feeder Monitor ====
The BFM was designed as a comprehensive retrofit solution for power-monitoring in legacy substations. Equipped with a modular setup of up to 18 three-phase current channels it can monitor a standard feeder. In order to communicate directly with utility SCADA the BFM is equipped with an ETH port and features DNP3.0 and IEC 60870-5-101/104 protocols. An embedded cellular module is implemented for remote locations where there is no communications infrastructure. A modular design allows to fit it with a combination of I/Os, analog and digital, for monitoring breaker status in the substation and for transducer functionality.

During 2020 SATEC added waveform capture and fault recording capabilities to this instruments to enhance substation monitoring.

=== Power Quality Monitoring ===
This field involves setting standards for quality of power, which system operators are obligated to deliver to end users and standard for the subsequent measurement and verification of the quality of electricity. Already when introducing the PM17X family, SATEC had entered the field of power quality monitoring. SA300 (ezPAC) was SATEC's first product designed to comply with IEC 61000-4-30 as a Class A product in categorization of compliance.

During 2009 SATEC added PQ reporting capability in compliance with the CIS GOST 13109-97 standard.

In April 2019 SATEC's PM180 was certified as Class A analyzer for compliance with Edition 3 (2015) of the above IEC standard.

=== The PRO Series ===
During March 2021 SATEC launched its PRO Series meters which aimed to bundle the most current utility requirements, which include dual port Ethernet for communication redundancy, waveform recording and implementation of IEC 61850. On the hardware side, the PRO is designed to host up to 4 add-on modules, allowing it to reach 26 I/Os per device.

With implementation of IEC 61850, along with Modbus, DNP3.0 and IEC 60870-5-101/104 the PRO Series set out to be a power metering IED, compatible with the IEC 61850 topology of the modern digital substation.

=== Remote Low-burden Current Sensors ===
Standard energy meters feature current inputs typically rated at 5A or 1A, making the meter reliant on an external CT to step-down standard distributed electrical currents. These two step-down transformations (external + internal) result in a combined error which is the product of an aggregation of factors. These include integral factors determining the meter's error, which is affected by amplifiers, A/D converters, passive components and noise resulting from circuit design.

An additional error factor results from the reliance on an external current transformer which adds its own error, including uncertainty resulting from the transformer's materials and design and error resulting from its built-in phase-shift which varies from unit to the other, even between batches of specific models.

Starting from May 2012 SATEC started designing product models equipped with 20mA current inputs, designated for interfacing current transformers with matching outputs. These transformers were branded by SATEC has HACS, standing for High Accuracy Current Transformers. This design allows direct connection of transformers rated up to 3000A to meter loads up to 200 meters away from the metering device, staying within the device's rated accuracy, due to the low burden of this output. This results in a "one-CT" system, avoiding with the extra loss of accuracy caused by an external CT. Testing each batch for phase-shift allows also programming the meters with the recorded phase-shift to allow for calculated compensation in the readings.

CTs at times are cause for fire hazards when unintentionally disconnected from the metering unit or when intentionally disconnected without applying shorting bars. Taking this into account, the HACS CTs were also designed with a safety switch to ensure that disconnecting them doesn't lead to the potentially hazardous high crest voltage.

=== DC Metering ===
With implementation of DC power systems on the rise, SATEC made minor adjustments during 2020 to allow the PRO Series meters and the PM130 to perform direct reading and measurement of DC current up to 3000A, via Hall Effect sensors and up to 3000 V DC, via a voltage-divider for voltages above 800 V DC. Among many applications, the need for such measurement comes up in context of photo voltaic systems and in modern design of data-center power systems.

=== AMI and Billing Applications ===
SATEC also uses its hardware infrastructure for smart metering and sub-tenant metering in commercial facilities such as shopping malls and office buildings. Examples of such projects were carried out in the Jerusalem Mamilla Shopping Center and in the New York Empire State Building. SATEC's U.S. and Israel branches also provide billing as a service, invoicing users and sub-tenants on behalf of commercial property owners and managers.

== Global Reach ==
Today SATEC operates in over 60 countries, mostly through local system-integrators, partners and distributors who market SATEC's solutions to local transmission and distribution network operators and industrial/commercial clients. Among SATEC's notable end-users are Con-Edison, BGE, Siemens-GAMESA, Coca-Cola, Intel, Airbus and others.
