= Yehuda (Leo) Levi =

German-born American-Israeli Haredi rabbi, physicist, writer and educator

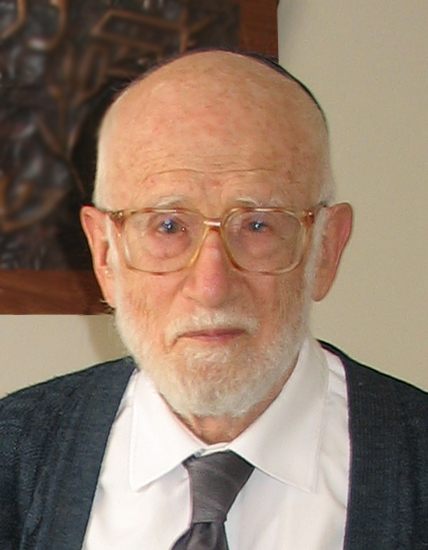
Prof Yehuda Levi

Yehuda (Leo) Levi (Hebrew: יהודה (ליאו) לוי; January 15, 1926 – June 17, 2019) was a German-born American-Israeli Haredi rabbi, physicist, writer and educator. He was Rector and Professor of Electro-optics at the Jerusalem College of Technology. Levi was best known as the author of several books on Science and Judaism, and Judaism in contemporary society, as well as on physics.

== Biography ==
Levi was born in Germany and was educated in the United States. He received his Bachelor's and master's degrees in electrical engineering from City College, N.Y. and his Ph.D. in physics from the Polytechnic Institute of Brooklyn in 1964. He studied Talmud at Gur Aryeh Institute's kollel, and received semicha (Rabbinic ordination) from Rabbi Yitzchak Hutner and additionally from Rabbi Joseph Breuer.

In 1970 he settled in Jerusalem with his wife and three sons, where he founded the electro-optics department of the Jerusalem College of Technology. He served as Rector of the college from 1982 to 1990.

Levi was a Fellow of the Gur Aryeh Institute for Advanced Jewish Scholarship, has been president of the Association of Orthodox Jewish Scientists , both in the US and in Israel, and was the recipient of the Feder (Torah & Science) and Abramowitz-Zeitlin (Jewish literature) awards.

He was latterly part of the faculty at the Yeshivat Dvar Yerushalayim (The Jerusalem Academy of Jewish Studies). Levi died in June 2019 at the age of 93.

== Works ==
In addition to over 100 articles published in various scientific, technical, and Judaica journals, Prof. Levi has published several books. He is known for combining analysis of practical issues in Jewish law with philosophic discussion.

- On Physics
  - Applied Optics, 2 vols. (Wiley, 1968 & 1980. ISBN 0-471-08051-9)
  - Handbook of Tables for Applied Optics (CRC, 1974. ISBN 0-87819-371-5)
  - Applied Optics in the Eighties, J.C.T., Jerusalem (Co-author)
- On Science and Torah
  - Vistas from Mt. Moriah: A Scientist Views Judaism and the World (Gur Aryeh Institute, 1959)
  - Jewish Chrononomy (Association of Orthodox Jewish Scientists and Gur Aryeh Institute, 1967)
  - Torah and Science - Their Interplay in the World Scheme (Association of Orthodox Jewish Scientists, New York, and Feldheim Publishers, 1983, 2006)
  - Halachic Times for Home and Travel (Rubin Mass, 1992)
  - ha-Mada sheba-Torah (Reuven Mas, 2001); Translation, The Science in Torah (Feldheim, 2004. ISBN 1-58330-657-9)
- On Torah in contemporary society
  - Man & Woman: The Torah Perspective (Feldheim, 1979)
  - Sha'arey Talmud Torah (Feldheim, 1981)
  - Mul Etgarei Hatekufah (Sinai, 1988); translation Facing Current Challenges (Hemed, 1998)
  - Torah Study: A Survey of Classic Sources on Timely Issues (Feldheim, 1990. ISBN 0-87306-555-7)
  - Modern Liberation — Torah Perspective on Contemporary Lifestyles (Hemed, Brooklyn, 1998)
- On Talmud
  - Kav VeNaki - with Rabbi Aryeh Carmell and Rabbi Dr. Gershon Metzger - a six-volume commentary in Hebrew on tractates of Seder Zeraim of the Jerusalem Talmud

== See also ==
- Modern day Orthodox Jewish views on evolution
