= The Living Torah and Nach =

English translations of the Tanakh

The Living Torah and The Living Nach are popular, clear and modern English translations of the Tanakh based on traditional Jewish sources, along with extensive notes, maps, illustrations, diagrams, charts, bibliography, and index.

A 2006 list, "An Annotated Bibliography Of Translations And Commentaries", placed these volumes in "Texts with Talmudic Translations" in second place, right after ArtScroll.

The series is published by Moznaim Publishers.

== The Living Torah ==
The Living Torah is a 1981 translation of the Torah by Rabbi Aryeh Kaplan. It was and remains a highly popular translation, and was reissued in a Hebrew-English version with haftarot for synagogue use.

Kaplan had the following goals for his translation, which were arguably absent from previous English translations:

- Make it clear and readable
- Keep it close to the basic meaning (peshat) of the text in many places, but in other places translated it to be in accord with post-biblical rabbinic commentary and Jewish codes of law.
- Keeping it faithful to Orthodox Jewish tradition
- Provide useful notes, a table of contents, illustrations, and a comprehensive index.

Kaplan's work has been hailed as one of the best English translations of the Torah because of his inclusion of the rabbinic elucidation of the text. Rabbi Chaim Pinchas Scheinberg, a prominent legal decider for the Orthodox community, is reported to have said that the translation is so good that if one is unable to read the Targum Onkelos, which is written in Aramaic, one can fulfill Shnayim mikra ve-echad targum, the obligatory weekly reading of the Torah twice in Hebrew and once with translation, with The Living Torah's translation.

A Russian language translation of The Living Torah has been published.

=== Special features ===
- The table of contents lists the wordings and page numbers of the 670 short descriptions he wrote for each section.
- Regarding the Torah's paragraph indicators, פ (PaTuAch/ Open-to-end-of-line) and ס (SaToom/ Closed-within-line-of-text), "Kaplan .. accentuates these in the English text."
- The introduction wrestles with maintaining the distinction between singular and plural for the word you. Kaplan then states that
  - "thee" is more correct
  - but he sees "thee" as violating a command, "every day the Torah should be as new." (he uses "You")

The work is also noted for its detailed index, thorough cross-references, extensive footnotes with maps and diagrams, and research on realia, flora, fauna, and geography (drawing on sources as varied as Josephus, Dio Cassius, Philostratus and Herodotus). The footnotes also indicate differences in interpretation amongst the commentators, classic and modern.

The Living Torah was "compiled by the author in the short period of nine months."

== The Living Nach ==
The Living Torah was later supplemented by 3 volumes of The Living Nach: Early Prophets (1994) and Later Prophets (1995) for Nevi'im, and Sacred Writings (1998) for Ketuvim. These follow Rabbi Kaplan's format and approach, and were prepared posthumously: the former two by Yaakov Elman (Yeshiva University); the third by Moshe Schapiro, M.H. Mykoff (Breslov Research Institute), and Gavriel Rubin.

== See also ==
- Jewish English Bible translations
