= Eliyahu Eliezer Dessler =

Lithuanian rabbi

Rabbi Eliyahu Eliezer Dessler
- אליהו אליעזר דסלר
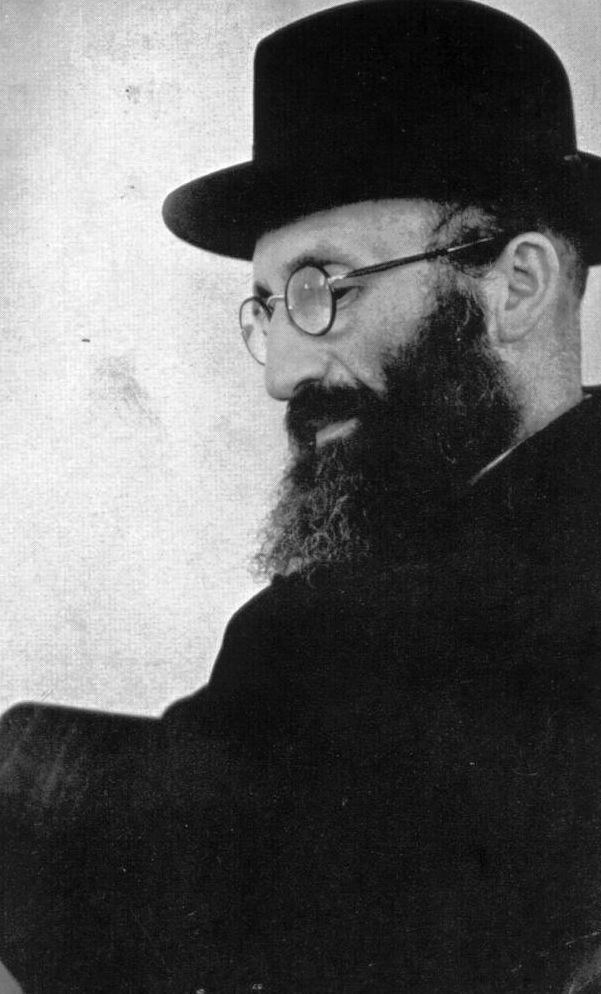

Personal life
- Born: 1892 Gomel, Russian Empire
- Died: 31 December 1953 (aged 61) Israel
- Spouse: Bluma (m. 1920)
- Parent: Reuven Dov Dessler
- Known for: Mashgiach ruchani of Ponevezh yeshiva
- Other name: Elya Lazer
- Occupation: Rabbi, talmudic scholar, jewish philosopher

Religious life
- Religion: Judaism
- Denomination: Orthodox

Eliyahu Eliezer Dessler (Hebrew: אליהו אליעזר דסלר; 1892 – 31 December 1953) was an Orthodox rabbi, Talmudic scholar, and Jewish philosopher of the 20th century. He is best known for being the mashgiach ruchani ("spiritual counselor") of the Ponevezh yeshiva in Israel and through collections of his writings published posthumously by his pupils.

== Biography ==
=== Lithuania ===
Eliyahu Dessler, who was known throughout his life as Eliyahu Leizer or Elya Lazer, was born in 1892 (5652) in Gomel. His father, Reuven Dov Dessler, was a disciple of one of the main leaders of the Musar movement, Rabbi Simcha Zissel Ziv, best known as the Alter (Elder) of Kelm. Eliyahu was orphaned of his mother at a young age. His father remarried, and would become a successful timber merchant in the city of Homel over the ensuing years, although he would lose virtually his whole fortune after the Russian Revolution, which would prompt his son to relocate to England (1929).

The young Elya was taught by private tutors. At the age of 13 (in 1906), he was to be one of the youngest students at the yeshiva of Kelm, which was then being led by Rabbi Zvi Hirsch Braude, the son-in-law of the founder. Rabbi Dessler would later speak in fond terms on the study and self-perfection in the Kelm yeshiva. It was unusual in the sense that it provided its pupils with a secular education parallel to their religious studies, enabling them to earn a livelihood rather than having to take up rabbinic positions.

In Kelm, Eliyahu was a diligent student, and received semicha (Rabbinic ordination) from his uncle, Rabbi Chaim Ozer Grodzinski, who became the spiritual leader of Orthodox Lithuanian Jewry until his death in 1939 and rarely granted ordinations.

In 1920 Rabbi Dessler married Bluma, a granddaughter of the "Alter" of Kelm. He entered business with his father, and declined a position as a rabbinical judge in Vilna.

After the death of his stepmother in 1928, Dessler was obliged to accompany his father to London for medical treatment, and decided to remain in the United Kingdom. His wife and children stayed behind for the time being.

=== London ===
In London Dessler served in the rabbinate, initially in the East End and later in Dalston, Northeast London. His family joined him in 1931.

In Dalston he started tutoring a number of young people, and for a while he was the private tutor of the children of the wealthy Sassoon family. A pupil from this time, Aryeh Carmell, became one of the main disseminators of Dessler's ideas after his death.

His son left London in the early 1930s to study in the yeshiva of Kelm. During the war they escaped to the Far East, and eventually settled in the United States. Several months before the outbreak of World War II, his wife left for Lithuania with her daughter to visit relatives. The war separated them, and the women spent the war mainly in Australia.

=== Gateshead ===
In the early 1940s, Dessler assumed leadership of the newly formed Gateshead kollel, an institute of religious study for married men, then a novelty in Western Europe. During the ensuing years he led the kollel, raised its funds, and also tutored small groups of young people.

=== Ponevezh ===
In the late 1940s, the leadership of the Ponevezh yeshiva in the Israeli town of Bnei Berak convinced Dessler to become mashgiach ruchani (spiritual counsellor and lecturer on ethical issues). He relocated to Israel, again gathering a small circle of students. One of his pupils, Chaim Friedländer, would later fill his position as Ponevezh mashgiach.

=== Death ===
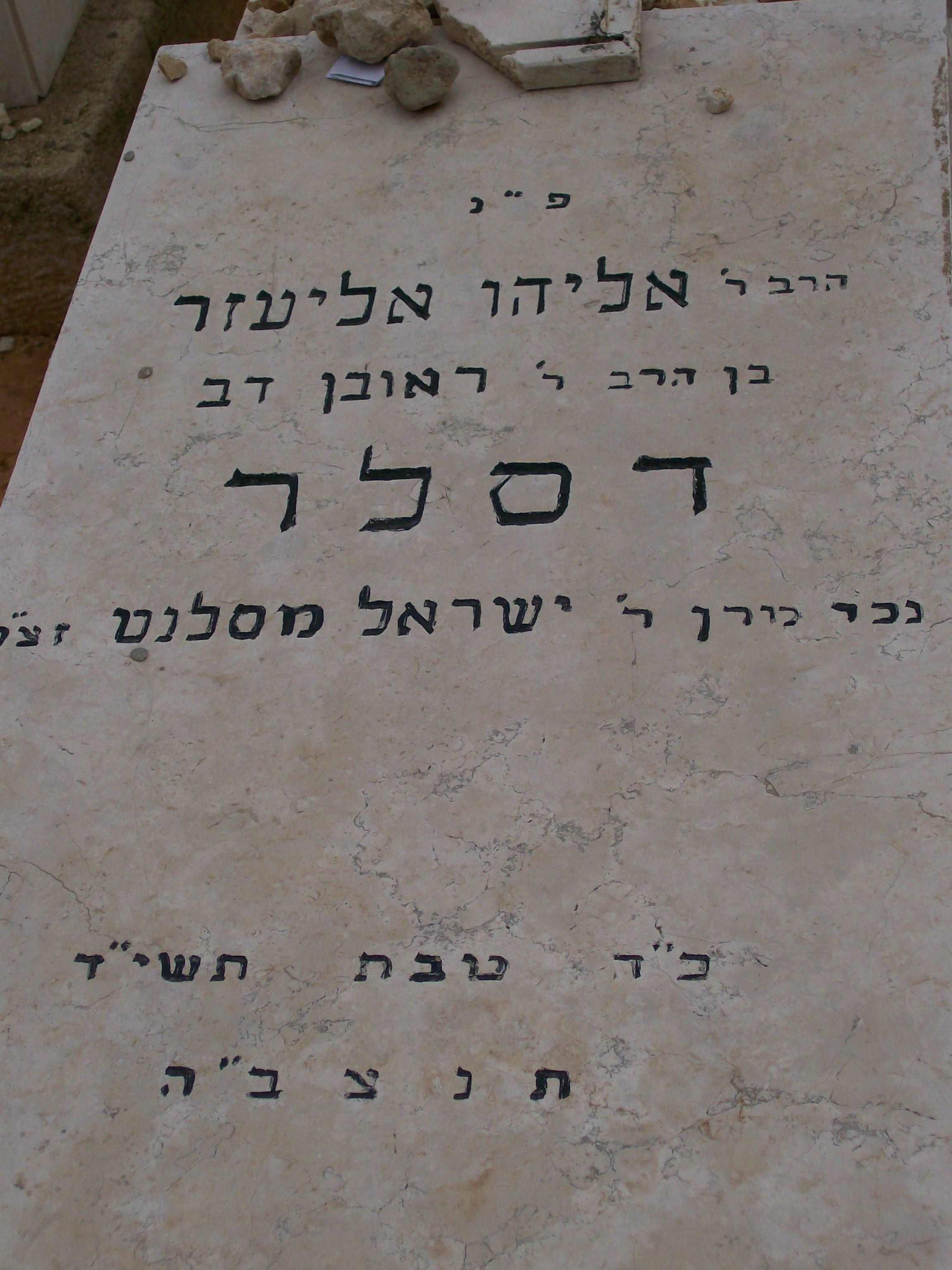

Rabbi Dessler died quite suddenly on December 31, 1953 (Hebrew date 25 Tevet 5714), presumably of ischemic heart disease. He had suffered from peripheral vascular disease in the months prior to his death.

== Philosophy ==
=== Michtav me-Eliyahu ===
Most of Rabbi Dessler's work has reached the public through the pupils he reared in England and Israel, chiefly Aryeh Carmell and Chaim Friedlander. Together, they edited his collected correspondence and ethical writings posthumously in the six-volume Michtav me-Eliyahu ("Letter from Elijah" which alludes to the letter that the prophet Elijah sent to the King of Judah that arrived after Elijah ascended to heaven in a chariot of fire), later translated into English and published as "Strive for Truth".

Perhaps one of his most influential ideas, discussed throughout his works but especially in an essay in the first volume of Michtav me-Eliyahu entitled Kuntres ha-Chesed (Heb. קונטרס החסד "Pamphlet [on the topic] of Lovingkindness), is the "Jewish philosophy of love." He observes that the perfect love from the point of view of Jewish philosophy is not "give and take" but focuses exclusively on giving.

Dessler also believed that the acquisition of secular knowledge came at the expense of Torah knowledge. He warned against studying foreign or secular ideas.

He also warned against preoccupation with materialism and technology, which, in his view, distance mankind from spirituality and detracted from believing in Hashgacha Pratis ( Divine providence in Judaism § Haredi Judaism ). He writes that a civilization which is preoccupied with developing the external and the material, and neglects the inner moral content will eventually degenerate to its lowest possible depths.

One idea of his, expounded on in Michtav me-Eliyahu, is the Nekudas Habechira (point of free will). He states that a man has one point in his service to God where he has to fight his evil inclination, while at other points there will be no struggle, for the levels below this have already been conquered, and he will easily win those battles of will; whereas levels higher are not yet within his grasp. (For example, someone who adheres to Orthodox Judaism will have no problem keeping kosher, but may sometimes be tempted to rely on unreliable kosher supervision, while somebody farther away from religious practice will have to struggle with whether to eat a ham sandwich (which is non-kosher regardless of supervision).) Each time one defeats the evil inclination by choosing to do good over evil, his Nekudas Habechira is raised a bit higher, and that choice will be easier for him to make in the future. Consequently, Man's task in life is to consistently raise his Nekudas Habechira, thus growing ever greater in his service of God. See Free will in theology § Judaism generally.

=== Influences ===
While it is difficult to determine which teachers had most influence on Rabbi Dessler, it is apparent that he is a child of the yeshiva world of the early 20th century, which was then influenced heavily by the ethical Musar movement, but has similarly gained proficiency in Kabbalah and works of Hasidic Judaism and Jewish philosophy. His method in interpreting tenets of Jewish philosophy reveals an adherence to the principles of the Maharal (Rabbi Loeb of Prague, 16th century). He drew inspiration from the teachings of Rabbi Nahman of Bratslav. A minor influence appears to have been the 19th century Hasidic work, Tanya. Rabbi Dessler did, however, maintain that it is acceptable to believe that the Zohar was not written by Rabbi Shimon bar Yochai and that it had a late authorship.

== Bibliography ==
- Michtav me-Eliyahu collected correspondence and ethical writings, published posthumously by his pupils Rabbis Chaim Friedländer and Aryeh Carmell. Selected translations into English have appeared as "Strive for Truth" and "Sanctuaries in Time" (Feldheim publishers, inc.);
- Chiddushei ha-Gaon Rabbi Eliyahu Eliezer al ha-Shas (novellae on the Talmud, published posthumously, 1986).
- Rosenblum J. Rav Dessler; the life and impact of Rabbi Eliyahu Eliezer Dessler, the Michtav M'Eliyahu. Brooklyn, New York: Mesorah Publications, Ltd, 2000. ISBN 1-57819-506-3.
