= Dvar Yerushalayim =

Coordinates: 31°46′59.08″N 35°10′37.93″E

Yeshivat Dvar Yerushalayim
- ישיבת דבר ירושלים
- Har Nof; Jerusalem

Information
- School type: Yeshiva
- Religious affiliation: Orthodox Judaism
- Founded: 1970
- Founder: Rabbi Baruch Horovitz
- Status: Open
- Rosh yeshiva: Rabbi Baruch Horovitz
- Website: dvar.org.il

Yeshivat Dvar Yerushalayim, also called the Jerusalem Academy of Jewish Studies, is a yeshiva for baalei teshuva currently located in the Har Nof neighborhood of Jerusalem. The yeshiva was founded in 1970 by Rabbi Boruch Horovitz.

== Faculty ==
He moved to Israel to study at the Hebron Knesset Israel Yeshiva in Jerusalem. Prior to his move to Israel, Rabbi Boruch Horovitz was a rabbi in Manchester, England. Born 1930 in Frankfurt, his family and he moved to London pre-WW II. Horovitz studied in Gateshead and, in 1957, became rav of Manchester's Central Synagogue.

== See also ==
- Baal teshuva
- Jewish fundamentalism
- Orthodox Judaism outreach
