= Aryeh Carmell =

Aryeh Carmell (1917 – September 2006) was a British Orthodox rabbi, scholar, and author.

== Biography ==
=== Early life and education ===
Aryeh Carmell was born in London, England, in 1917, to a Russian family of Jews. He was educated at public (i.e. State) schools, and then by private tutors. His primary tutor was Rav Dessler, one of the outstanding Torah scholars of the generation, who later became Rosh Kollel at Gateshead in the early 1940s, and then (in the late 1940s) went on to serve as Mashgiach Ruchani at the Ponevezh Yeshiva in Bnei Brak.

=== Career ===
Rabbi Carmell was a successful mortgage broker and real estate developer, living and working in London, England. His passion, however, was Torah study. In addition to giving regular classes in Torah at his home in the Stamford Hill neighborhood, he founded the Jewish Scholarship Center, the British Shabbos Observance Bureau and the Association of Orthodox Jewish Scientists. He was in constant communication with the prominent rabbis of the day. He also co-authored a Hebrew-language book entitled "Michtav Me'Eliyahu" ("A letter from Eliyahu"), which was the first written exposition of the philosophical teachings of Rabbi Dessler. "Michtav Me'Eliyahu" became a very popular work of philosophy and ethics, and was translated into several languages. Rabbi Carmell personally translated it into English (under the name "Strive for Truth!") and into modern Hebrew (the original work containing too much Aramaic for the average Hebrew speaker). In addition to Rabbi Dessler, Rabbi Carmell saw Rabbi Samson Raphael Hirsch as an important influence, and based his Masterplan on the concept of Rabbi Hirsch's Horeb. In 1972, Rabbi Carmell and his family moved to Jerusalem, where he taught at the Jerusalem Institute (Dvar Yerushalayim) and elsewhere and where he continued to write and publish.

In addition to "Strive for Truth!", he authored "Challenge: Torah views on science and its problems", "Aids to Talmud Study", and "Masterplan: Judaism, its program, meaning and goals", and edited "Encounter: Essays on Torah and modern life", all published by Feldheim Publishers.

=== Death ===
Carmell died in Jerusalem in September 2006.
