= Association of Orthodox Jewish Scientists =

U.S. organization for Jewish scientists

- Abbreviation: AOJS
- Founded: December 28, 1947; 77 years ago
- Merger of: Rephael Society
- Tax ID no.: 13-6160865
- Legal status: 501(c)(3) nonprofit organization
- Headquarters: Fresh Meadows, Queens, New York
- President: Allen Bennett
- Revenue: $0 (2014)
- Expenses: $3,031 (2014)
- Website: www.aojs.org

The Association of Orthodox Jewish Scientists (AOJS) is an organization of scientists committed to the views and beliefs of Orthodox Judaism and promote the integration of scientific and Orthodox Jewish worldviews. The purpose of the organization was to provide a social milieu that supported the Orthodox theological stance of “Torah im Derekh Eretz" in Jewish communal life. The AOJS organized annual conventions and publications to support this aim, allowing for extensive interaction between religious and scientific worldviews.

== Background ==
Founded in 1947 by a small group of religiously committed scientists, the AOJS is an organization devoted to the orientation of science within the framework of Orthodox Jewish tradition. The organization aims to assist those endeavors which will help improve the Torah way of life for Jews throughout the modern world, both intellectually and practically. The AOJS provides an intellectual meeting ground for people who can contribute to the constructive incorporation of scientific knowledge and thinking into the Torah way of life through their professional qualifications, interests and activities. Concern is paid to ideological problems relating to the apparent points of conflict between scientific theory and Orthodox Judaism. At the time of its founding, the association formulated five purposes:

1. clarifying the connection between science and Torah;
2. considering the application of the principles of halakha in particular issues;
3. providing an opportunity for education and interaction with professionals sharing a common interest;
4. providing guidance to Orthodox Jewish students considering a career in science;
5. providing study and training in areas of science needed in Israel.

By the early 1960s, the organization reached nearly 2,000 dues-paying members. Time magazine reported that the organization had over 1,000 members by the late 1960s.

=== Activities ===
In terms of education and guidance, Assistance to individuals and institutions in the solution of practical problems encountered by Orthodox Jews and their children in the study or practice of scientific pursuits; support for the educational ideal of a true synthesis of Jewish and secular studies. For example, the AOJS Medical-Dental section maintains a list of shomer Shabbos medical residency positions available around the U.S.

In terms of the intersection between science and Jewish law, association members provide consulting services to rabbinical authorities concerned with the implications of technological developments for the Jewish rituals and religious practices.

AOJS convention themes often center on Jewish religious perspectives on Darwin's theory of evolution.

== History ==
Previously, the idea of an Orthodox Jewish scientist was considered abnormal on the Jewish scene. In the 1940s, despite general shock over the Holocaust, some of the most prestigious universities still had formal or informal quotas limiting the number of Jews and exams were often held on Shabbat and Jewish holidays. As a result, for every 1 Orthodox Jewish science student there were 1,000 other Jewish students. In the U.S. today, religiously observant Jewish university students are common from the observant doctor, physicist, computer programmer to the engineer and psychologist.

Often called upon by the rabbi to explain the scientific principles that will guide him in his halachic decision making, the Orthodox Jewish scientist has become an integral part of Orthodox Jewish observance in the ever-changing modern world. Rabbis faced with the need to apply the halacha to a rapidly changing technological world find it easier to communicate their needs to Torah scholars who are equally well versed in the sciences. The Orthodox Jewish scientist has indeed come a long way in the synthesis of Torah and science.

On December 28, 1947, a group of scientists, most of them graduate students in the natural sciences, sat down at the first meeting of AOJS. The founding group set down five goals: to clarify the bond between science and the Torah; to apply Torah principles in solving specific problems; to further themselves professionally and socially by associating with others who had common interests; to advise religious students interested in science; and to train in areas of science needed in Israel. The organization reached its peak in the early 1960s when they had nearly 2,000 dues-paying members.

Since its inception in 1947, the AOJS has been at the forefront of addressing the interface of science and halacha. Initially, AOJS served as a safe haven and social outlet for a few religious physicists and chemists to share their ideas, and as an agency to resolve apparent conflicts between scientific findings and Torah beliefs. It also became the address for those seeking halachic guidance in areas where halacha and science interfaced.

In the 1960s, AOJS expanded its domain to service those in the medical, nursing, computer psychological and social sciences. It was also during this period that AOJS became involved in social activism. It would decry, raise public awareness, and create and/or assist agencies working in the areas of spousal, child and drug abuse in the Orthodox community. It was also active in seeking the release of Jewish scientists from the USSR.

The AOJS is divided into three major sections: physical & computer sciences, medical & life sciences, and behavioral sciences. The Orthodox Jewish scientist working through the AOJS, has become a major source of reliable scientific information for the Torah community all over the world, and is recognized as having made important contributions in very practical ways to the development of the halacha.

From the perspective of Jewish law and theology, AOJS provides a forum for research, innovation and discussion of these increasingly difficult areas. AOJS, as well, has created an open forum in which scientists can consult, network and concur with fellow professionals in their discipline. There are, to date, over 2000 members and friends of the AOJS, worldwide - including professionals (doctors, psychologists, research scientists, etc.), academicians, rabbis, students and informed people.

AOJS has hosted hundreds of conventions, conferences, symposiums and lecture series' that have broadly focused on these subjects. Thousands of articles have been published and circulated to the Orthodox Jewish public pertaining to the science/halacha interface. Books have been published, scientific advances have been made, difficult areas in halacha have been clarified.

== Publications ==
- Intercom Quarterly: a quarterly newsletter including articles written by AOJS members and non-members on any topic of their choice in the halacha/science interface (approximately 4 articles per issue). Articles are submitted on a volunteer basis. A call for articles is publicized prior to each issue. Comments on previous articles are also included in subsequent issues. Special Editions are as well circulated, corresponding to and summarizing different annual AOJS events. The Intercom Quarterly editors are Yossi Bennett and Chaya Wajngurt-Levy, Ph.D.
- Proceedings: a compilation of essays written by experts in the different fields of science and halacha published (by Feldheim Publishers) between the years of 1966 and 1975. Eleven volumes of Proceedings were published. Volumes of Proceedings are no longer being published. However, AOJS is working on transcribing the Proceedings of old and making them available to the public over the AOJS website.
- Halacha Bulletin (renamed Practical Medical Halacha): originally, a monthly, formal responsum to a halachic question of interest to our members edited and circulated by Dr. Fred Rosner and Rabbi Dr. Moshe D. Tendler Initiated by the Rephael Society- Mental-Dental Section of AOJS, presently, Halacha Bulletin is being circulated on a quarterly basis and is based on teachings from the Nishmat Avraham by Dr. Abraham S. Abraham. The Practical Medical Halacha director is Robert Schulman, M.D.
- Rephael Society Newsletter: a newsletter devoted to one topic in Jewish medical ethics each issue. Aside from a medical overview of the topic, the Newsletter includes the comments and opinions of the leading authorities in Jewish medical ethics today. The Rephael Society Newsletter director is Daniel Eisenberg, M.D.
- Directory(s): a directory listing all orthodox physicians and dentists and their contact information in the United States, regardless of membership in AOJS; a directory listing all members of AOJS members and their contact information; a Shomer Shabbat Residency Directory listing all Shomer Shabbat Residencies in the U.S.

== Past-presidents ==
- 1948-1959 Eli Levine, Ph.D.
- 1960-1962 Elmer L. Offenbacher, Ph.D.
- 1963 Herbert Goldstein, Ph.D.
- 1964-1965 Azriel Rosenfeld, Ph.D.
- 1966-1967 Seymour Glick, M.D.
- 1968-1969 Yehuda (Leo) Levi, Ph.D.
- 1970 Theodore Fink, M.D.
- 1971-1972 Rabbi Moshe David Tendler, Ph.D.
- 1973-1974 Rabbi Paul Kahn, Ph.D.
- 1975-1976 Nora Smith, M.D.
- 1977-1978 Herbert Goldstein, Ph.D.
- 1979-1980 Rueben Rudman, Ph.D.
- 1981-1982 Lester Kaufman, A.C.S.W.
- 1983-1984 Erwin Friedman, Ph.D.
- 1985-1986 Sheldon Kornbluth, P.E.
- 1987-1988 Allen J. Bennett, M.D., F.A.C.P.
- 1989-1990 Seymour Applebaum, M.D.
- 1990-1993 Neil Maron, Ph.D.
- 1993- Allen J. Bennett, M.D., F.A.C.P.

=== Chairman of the board of governors ===
- 1960 - Aaron D. Krumbein Ph.D in physics
- 1962 - Walter Feder M.D. from the University of Chicago
- 1964-1998 the outgoing President became the Chairman of the Board (the constitution limited the term of the President to two years).
