= Nathan Aviezer =

American-Israeli physicist

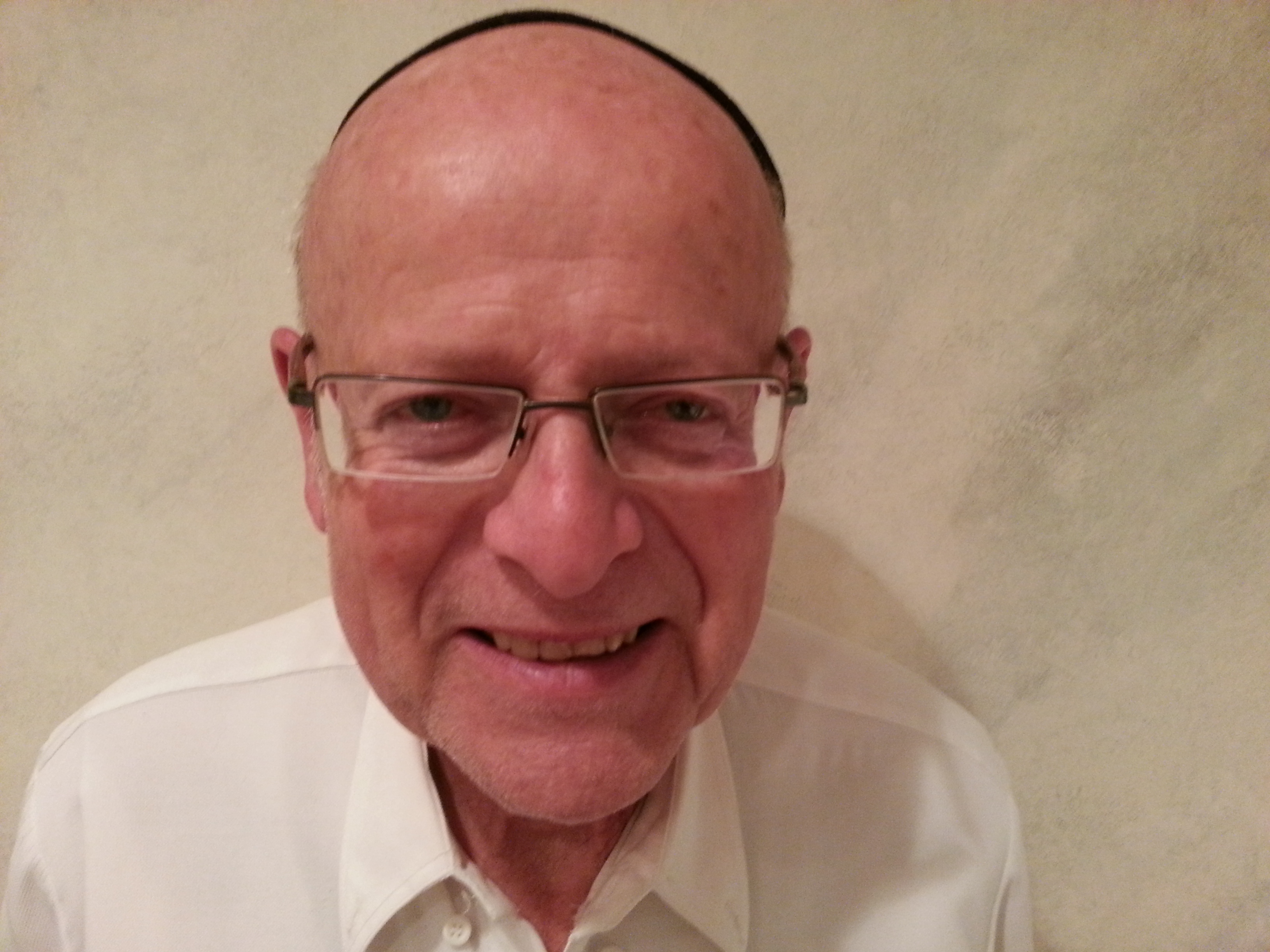
Nathan Aviezer, November 2014

Nathan Aviezer (Hebrew: נתן אביעזר; 7 November 1935) is an American-Israeli physicist who writes on Torah and science, especially on evolution and cosmology from an Orthodox Jewish perspective. He is a professor of physics and former chairman of the Physics Department of Bar-Ilan University.

== Biography ==
Aviezer was born in Switzerland in 1935 and raised in the United States. He received his doctorate in physics from the University of Chicago, and subsequently held a research position at the University of Illinois in the research group of Professor John Bardeen, the only person ever to be awarded two Nobel Prizes in physics. He was then invited to join the research group at the IBM Watson Research Center near New York headed by Professor Leo Esaki, who was also a Nobel Prize winner. In 1967, Aviezer and his wife Dvora made aliyah to Israel. He is the author of 140 scientific articles on solid state physics. In recognition of his important research contributions, he was honored by being elected as a Fellow of the American Physical Society (1984).

In addition to his scientific research, Aviezer has a long-standing involvement in Torah and science and he has written three books on the subject: "In the Beginning" (translated into nine languages),"Fossils and Faith" (translated into four languages), "Modern Science and Ancient Faith" (recently published). For several decades, Aviezer has received invitation to lecture on the subject of Torah and science throughout the world. Aviezer also gives a course in Torah and science at Bar-Ilan University. In 1999, his course was awarded the prestigious Templeton Prize. Aviezer continues to give lectures on Torah and science throughout Israel as well as abroad.

== Views on creation and evolution ==
Aviezer publishes on the subject of Torah and science, using the language of science and rejecting creationism. Aviezer allows for divine guidance within an evolutionary paradigm in the transmutation of species over time, including the emergence of modern man. He interprets the six days of creation as broadly referring to large periods of time, an interpretation for which he cites rabbinic sources, including Maimonides and Nachmanides, citing in particular the problem with defining the several "days" of creation that precede the creation of the Sun, according to the Biblical narrative.
