= Gerald Schroeder =

American-Israeli Jewish physicist

Gerald L. Schroeder
- ג'רלד לורנס שרדר
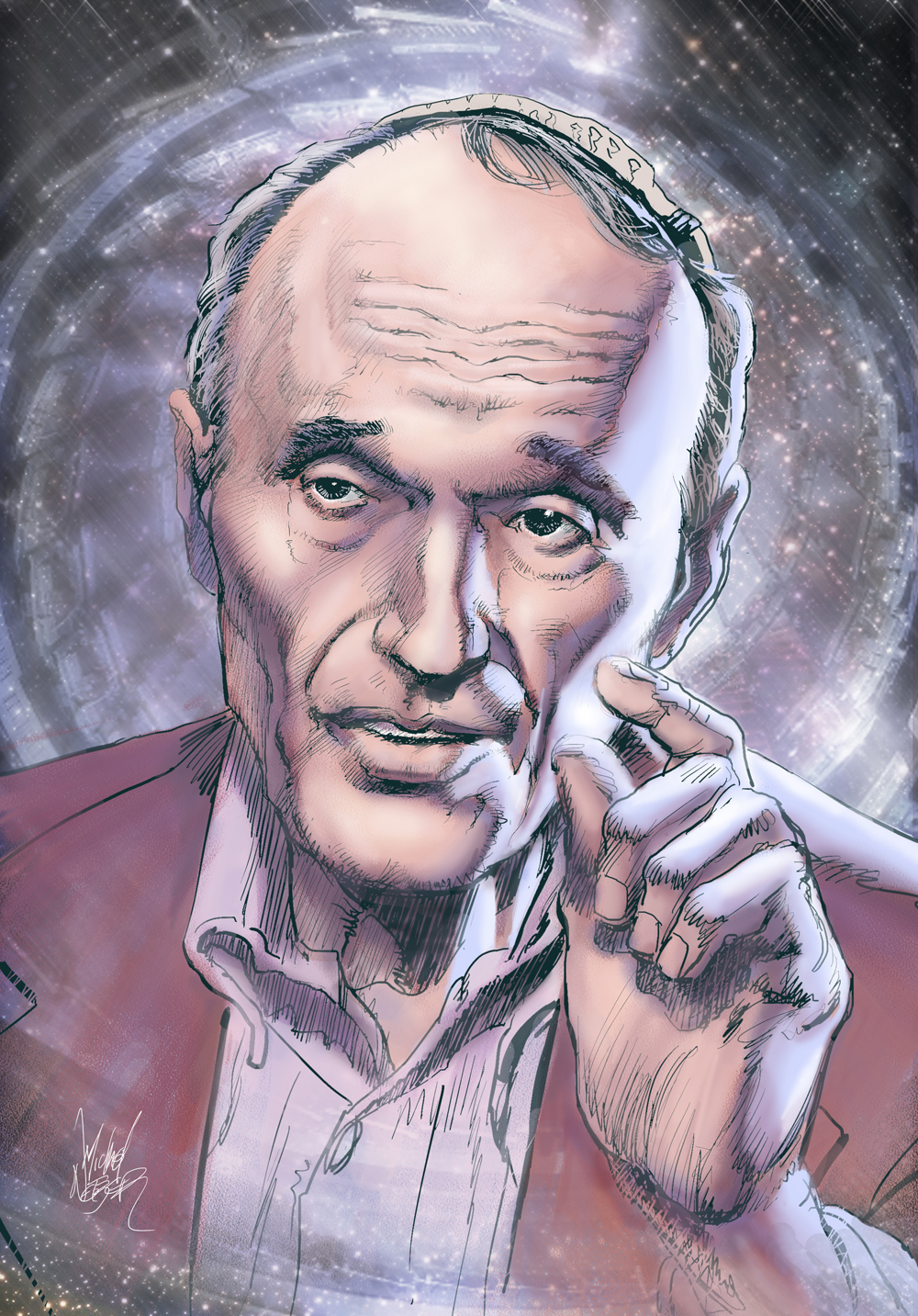
- Portrait by Michael Netzer
- Born: February 20, 1938 (age 88); New York City, U.S.
- Education: Massachusetts Institute of Technology
- Website: http://geraldschroeder.com/

Gerald Lawrence Schroeder (Hebrew: ג'רלד לורנס שרדר; born 20 February 1938) is an American-Israeli Orthodox Jewish physicist, author, lecturer, and teacher at College of Jewish Studies Aish HaTorah's Discovery Seminar, Essentials and Fellowships programs and Executive Learning Center, who focuses on what he perceives to be an inherent relationship between science and spirituality.

== Education ==
Schroeder received his BSc in 1959, his MSc in 1961, and his PhD in nuclear physics and earth and planetary sciences in 1965, from the Massachusetts Institute of Technology (MIT). He worked seven years on the staff of the MIT physics department. He was a member of the United States Atomic Energy Commission.

== Aliyah to Israel ==
After immigrating to Israel in 1971, Schroeder was employed as a researcher at the Weizmann Institute of Science, the Volcani Research Institute, and the Hebrew University of Jerusalem. He currently teaches at Aish HaTorah College of Jewish Studies.

== Religion and science ==
Schroeder's works frequently cite Talmudic, Midrashic and medieval commentaries on the biblical creation account, such as commentaries written by the Jewish philosopher Nachmanides while also referencing scientific discoveries. Antony Flew, an academic philosopher who promoted atheism for most of his adult life, indicated that the arguments of Gerald Schroeder had influenced his late-in-life decision to become a deist.

Schroeder's ideas to reconcile faith and science have drawn some criticism from both Christians and non-religious scientists. Natan Slifkin argues that Schroeder's calculations do not fit the order of creation as presented in Genesis vs. the order of organism development as dictated by our current understanding of evolutionary biology.

== Personal ==
Schroeder's wife Barbara Sofer is a columnist for the English-language Israeli newspaper The Jerusalem Post. The couple have five children.

== Prizes ==
In 2012, Schroeder was awarded the Trotter Prize by Texas A&M University's College of Science.

== Works ==
- Genesis and the Big Bang (1990), ISBN 0-553-35413-2
- The Science of God: The Convergence of Scientific and Biblical Wisdom, (1997), ISBN 0-7679-0303-X
- The Hidden Face of God: Science Reveals the Ultimate Truth, (2002), ISBN 0-7432-0325-9.
- God According to God: A Physicist Proves We've Been Wrong About God All Along, (2009), ISBN 978-0-06-171015-5.
