= Herman Branover =

Russian-Israeli physicist (1931–2026)

Branover in the 1970s

Herman Branover (Hebrew: ירמיהו ברנובר, Russian: Герман Брановер; 13 December 1931 – 4 May 2026) was a Soviet-Israeli physicist and Jewish educator. He is best known in the Jewish world as an author, translator, publisher and educator. Branover is known in the scientific community as a pioneer in the field of magnetohydrodynamics. In his personal conduct, he adhered to the customs and mystical philosophy of Chabad Hasidism.

== Life and career ==
=== Early life and education ===
Branover was born in Riga, Latvia, into an atheist Jewish family. His father, Hertz Branover, was an agronomist who directed the Muskati experimental farm to prepare young Jews to work in agriculture in British Mandatory Palestine. Branover's father was accidentally killed in World War II by the withdrawing Red Army, but his mother managed to escape with him and his sister to Siberia and survive. He earned his Ph.D. in 1953 in hydro-energetics from the Leningrad Polytechnic Institute and completed a D.Sc. degree 1962 from the Moscow Aviation Institute, specializing in magnetohydrodynamics. Concurrently, he spent a substantial part of his time in the National Library of Russia where he learned Hebrew from whatever books he could find there, until they were confiscated, as part of the Soviet oppression of Jewish culture. After finishing his studies, he returned to Riga and started working in several scientific institutions while also making inroads into the underground Chabad movement. When he first applied for a permission to immigrate to Israel in 1971, he lost his academic job.

As a young scientist in Riga, Branover wrote philosophical essays questioning atheism, materialism, and determinism and seeking God. During his time in the USSR after becoming associated with Chabad, he initiated and directed a great number of activities advancing Jewish education and culture; he was among the initiators of the Jewish revival movement in Soviet Russia. Being a Refusenik, he underwent frequent arrests, interrogations, and harassment by the KGB. This did not stop him from teaching Jewish thought and ethics to many individuals and groups. In the end of 1972, Branover received an exit visa to go to Israel. Branover was the first Jew holding a Doctor of Science degree and the title of Full Professor to receive an exit visa to leave the USSR. The ransom tax for these diplomas was 31,000 rubles (~37,000 USD then).

=== Scientific achievements ===
Upon his arrival in Israel, Branover became a professor at the Ben-Gurion University. There, in 1977, he founded the Center for Magnetohydrodynamics Studies, which included a laboratory for the research of magnetohydrodynamics. He obtained funding for the laboratory through a chance meeting at a lecture he delivered with representatives from the Office of Naval Research. He credits the Lubavitcher Rebbe for encouraging him to accept the speaking invitation.

In 1980, Branover developed a method through which electricity could be produced through the heating of liquid mercury through a magnet. His innovation was that the electrical field could be produced at relatively low temperatures. In 1984 he created a working model for his innovative electrical source. His aim was to manufacture a magnetohydrodynamics power generator to produce clean energy without the use of petroleum. A research and development company, Solmecs, was created to market Branover's magnetohydrodynamics generator and many technological by-products of his research. He published over 300 professional papers and textbooks on the behavior of liquid metals in magenetic fields (see "Works" below).

=== Activism for Russian Jews ===
In addition to his scientific achievements, Branover was an active spiritual leader of Jews in the Soviet Union and later emigrants to Israel. He chaired the Shamir Association of Professionals from the USSR and served as editor-in-chief of its publishing house which printed over 400 titles of Torah literature in Russian, notably translations of the Pentateuch with commentaries, prayer books, the Code of Jewish Law, Maimonides, Yehuda Halevi, and the Tanya. Branover was also the founding editor-in-chief of the B'Or Ha'Torah Journal of Science, Life and Art in the Light of the Torah. Together with Rabbi Shalom D. Lipskar of The Shul of Bal Harbour, B'Or Ha'Torah organized 15 international conferences on Torah and science in Miami.

Under Branover's direction, SHAMIR established a well-accredited Jewish day school in Saint Petersburg, Russia. Together with Rabbi Natan Barkan and Professor Ruvin Ferber, Branover organized international conferences in Riga entitled "Jews in a Changing World."

In 1987 Branover founded SATEC, which started out as a technological business incubator, soon after focusing on the development and manufacturing of power metering solutions, such as power meters and power quality analyzers. This move was inspired by the Lubavitcher Rebbe, who predicted an influx of Jewish immigration from the Soviet Union, following Perestroika. His aim was to create jobs in a fitting technological environment for these immigrants, many of them holding advanced scientific degrees and in-depth technological experience.

In 1991, the Russian Academy of Natural Sciences invited Branover to supervise its 8-volume Encyclopedia of Russian Jewry. Covering 1000 years, the encyclopedia details the contribution of Jews to Russian and world civilization. The late Isaiah Berlin of Oxford was the first chief consultant of the encyclopedia, Martin Gilbert was its second chief consultant, and the Israeli Ministry of Education helped support the project.

=== Personal life ===
Branover was a dedicated Hasid of Rabbi Menachem Mendel Schneerson.

Branover was married to Fania Branover who died in 2012. Their only child is Danny Branover.

Herman Yirmiyahu Branover died in New York on 4 May 2026, at the age of 94, and was buried in the Mount of Olives in Jerusalem.

== Works ==
- His early philosophical manuscripts were secretly reproduced and smuggled out of the USSR to Israel and published there in Russian and Hebrew by the Israeli Ministry of Education.
- While in the USSR, Branover undertook to translate some of the fundamental works of Judaism into Russian. He continued this work in Israel through SHAMIR, where he organized and trained a team of translators and editors to complete and expand his work, which included most importantly the Pentateuch with commentaries, the Code of Jewish Law, and writings of Maimonides and Yehuda Halevy. Over 12 million copies of 400 titles of Russian-language Judaica were published by SHAMIR.
- Branover's autobiography Return, including De Profundis, a collection of his early philosophical essays has been published in Russian, Spanish, Portuguese, Hebrew and English.
- Branover founded the periodical B’Or Ha’Torah in 1981 at the urging of the late Lubavitcher Rebbe, Menachem Mendel Schneerson, who gave the periodical its name. The publication allowed distinguished scientists – initially those close to the Rebbe – to bring their discussions of apparent contradictions between Torah and science to a wider audience. Out of 97 authors, 28 were Chabad Hasidim and 69 were not. Most of the referees were not affiliated with Chabad.

Herman Branover's published science and technology works include:

- MHD bluff body turbulent wake stabilization (2003)
- Single- and Multi-Phase Flows in an Electromagnetic Field: Energy, Metallurgical, and Solar Applications
- Magnetohydrodynamic Flow in Ducts (Wiley/Israel Universities Press, 1978)
- "Turbulence and Structures: Chaos, Fluctuations, and Helical Self-organization" in Nature and the Laboratory (Academic Press, 1999).
- "The Growth of Magnetohydrodynamics in Latvia and Israel: A retrospective on the evolution of MHD technology" (Springer, 2007).
- "Liquid-Metal Flows and Magnetohydrodynamics: Proceedings from the 3rd Beer-Sheva International Seminar" (AIAA, 1983).
- "Experimental investigation of the origin of residual disturbances in turbulent MHD flows after laminarization" Journal of Fluid Mechanics (1979).
- Branover, H. & Chkhetiani, O. & Eidelman, Alexander & Golbraikh, E. & Moiseev, S. (2001). "Chiral phenomena in MHD and MHD-like media." Magnetohydrodynamics 37, 06-01-2001.
- "The Growth of Magnetohydrodynamics in Latvia and Israel": A retrospective on the evolution of MHD technology (Springer, 2007).
- Branover H.H. and Lielausis O., "The characteristics of the transverse magnetic field effect onturbulent flow of liquid metal at different Reynolds numbers." Sov. Phys.-Techn. Phys. 10 (1965) 191–195.
