= Nevel (town) =

Town in Pskov Oblast, Russia

Nevel Невель
- Town
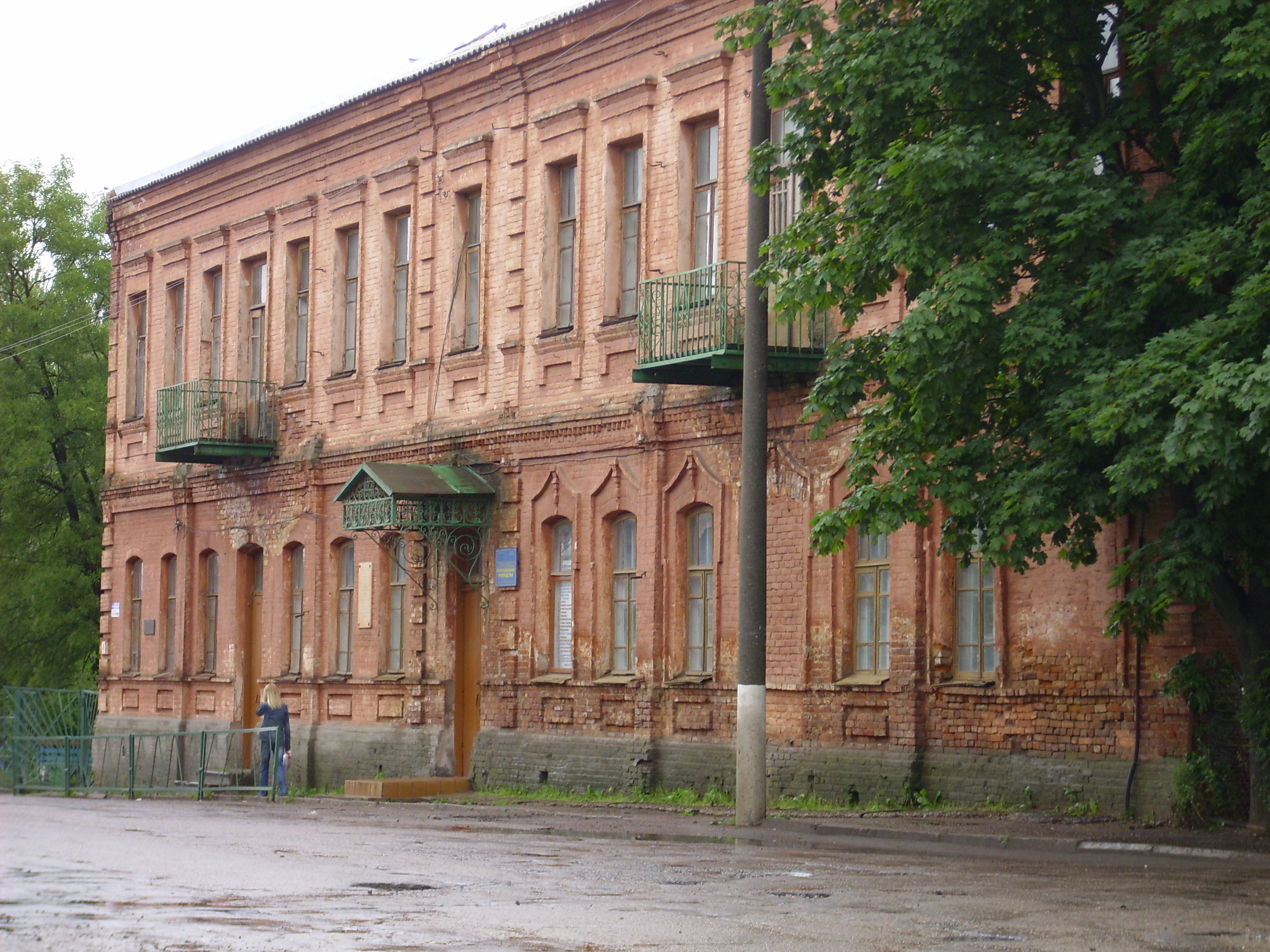

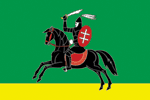
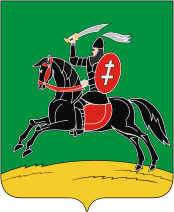
- Flag Coat of arms
- Interactive map of Nevel
- Location of Nevel Nevel (European Russia) Nevel (Russia)
- Coordinates: 56°02′N 29°55′E
- Country: Russia
- Federal subject: Pskov Oblast
- Administrative district: Nevelsky District
- Founded: 1504 (Julian)
- Town status since: 1772
- Elevation: 155 m (509 ft)

Population (2010 Census)
  - Total: 16,324
  - Estimate (2021): 13,980 (−14.4%)

Administrative status
  - Capital of: Nevelsky District

Municipal status
  - Municipal district: Nevelsky Municipal District
  - Urban settlement: Nevel Urban Settlement
  - Capital of: Nevelsky Municipal District, Nevel Urban Settlement
- Time zone: UTC+3 (MSK)
- Postal codes: 182500, 182503, 182549
- Dialing code: +7 81151
- OKTMO ID: 58620101001

Nevel (Russian: Не́вель) is a town and the administrative center of Nevelsky District in Pskov Oblast, Russia, located on Lake Nevel 242 kilometers (150 mi) southeast of Pskov, the administrative center of the oblast. Population: 16,324 (2010 census); 18,545 (2002 census); 22,472 (1989 Soviet census).

== History ==
Historical affiliations

Tsardom of Russia 1560s–1580
Polish–Lithuanian Commonwealth 1580–1582
Tsardom of Russia 1582–1617
Polish–Lithuanian Commonwealth 1617–1655
Tsardom of Russia 1655–1678
Polish–Lithuanian Commonwealth 1678–1772
Russian Empire 1772–1917
Russian Republic 1917
Soviet Belarus 1919
Soviet Russia 1919–1922
Soviet Union 1922–1941
Nazi Germany (occupation) 1941–1943
Soviet Union 1943–1991
Russian Federation 1991–present

Nevel was first mentioned in Ivan the Terrible's will among towns that had been founded during his reign. In 1562, during the Livonian War, it was the site of the Battle of Nevel, in which Poles defeated the Russians. In 1580, it was captured by Polish–Lithuanian forces aided by Hungarian infantry. In 1581, Polish-Russian peace talks were held in the town, to no avail, and the following year it eventually passed to Russia. In 1619, it was recaptured by the Polish–Lithuanian Commonwealth.

In 1623, it was granted Magdeburg rights by King Władysław IV Vasa. While part of the Polish–Lithuanian Commonwealth it was located in the Polotsk Voivodeship of the Grand Duchy of Lithuania. In 1634, Władysław IV granted Newel to the Radziwiłł family. At the time, there were eight churches, either Catholic or Orthodox, in the town. In 1655, the town was captured by the Russians, and the castle was destroyed, however, it was restored to the Polish–Lithuanian Commonwealth in 1678. A Jesuit mission was established in Nevel in 1761.

Nevel became part of Russia during the First Partition of Poland in 1772, when it was included into newly established Pskov Governorate, chartered, and made the seat of Nevesky Uyezd of Pskov Governorate. In 1777, it was transferred to Polotsk Viceroyalty. In 1796, the viceroyalty was abolished and Nevel was transferred to the Belarusian Governorate; it formed a part of Vitebsk Governorate from 1802. In 1897, the ethnic make-up, by mother tongue, was 62.4% Jewish, 25.6% Belarusian, 10.8% Russian, and 0.8% Polish. Two annual fairs were held in the town in the late 19th century.

=== 20th century ===
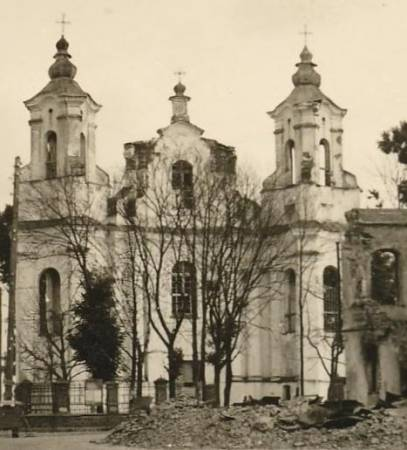
Former Polish St. Joseph's church

In early 1919 it was part of the Socialist Soviet Republic of Byelorussia. After 1919, Vitebsk Governorate was a part of the Russian Soviet Federative Socialist Republic. On March 24, 1924, Vitebsk Governorate was abolished, and Nevel was transferred to Pskov Governorate.

On August 1, 1927, the uyezds and governorates were abolished and Nevelsky District, with the administrative center in Nevel, was established as a part of Velikiye Luki Okrug of Leningrad Oblast. It included parts of former Nevelsky Uyezd. On June 3, 1929, Nevelsky District was transferred to Western Oblast. On July 23, 1930, the okrugs were also abolished and the districts were directly subordinated to the oblast. On January 29, 1935, Western Oblast was abolished and the district was transferred to Kalinin Oblast, and on February 5 of the same year, Nevelsky District became a part of Velikiye Luki Okrug of Kalinin Oblast, one of the okrugs abutting the state boundaries of the Soviet Union. On May 4, 1938, the district was subordinated directly to the oblast. During World War II, Nevel was under German occupation from 16 July 1941 until 6 October 1943. On August 22, 1944, the district was transferred to newly established Velikiye Luki Oblast. On October 2, 1957, Velikiye Luki Oblast was abolished and Nevelsky District was transferred to Pskov Oblast.

== Administrative and municipal status ==
Within the framework of administrative divisions, Nevel serves as the administrative center of Nevelsky District, to which it is directly subordinated. As a municipal division, the town of Nevel is incorporated within Nevelsky Municipal District as Nevel Urban Settlement.

== Demographics ==
Historical population
Year	Pop.	±%
1897	9,349	—
1989	22,472	+140.4%
2002	18,545	−17.5%
2010	16,324	−12.0%

== Economy ==
=== Industry ===
Nevel has enterprises of food, textile, shoemaking, and timber industries.

== Transportation ==
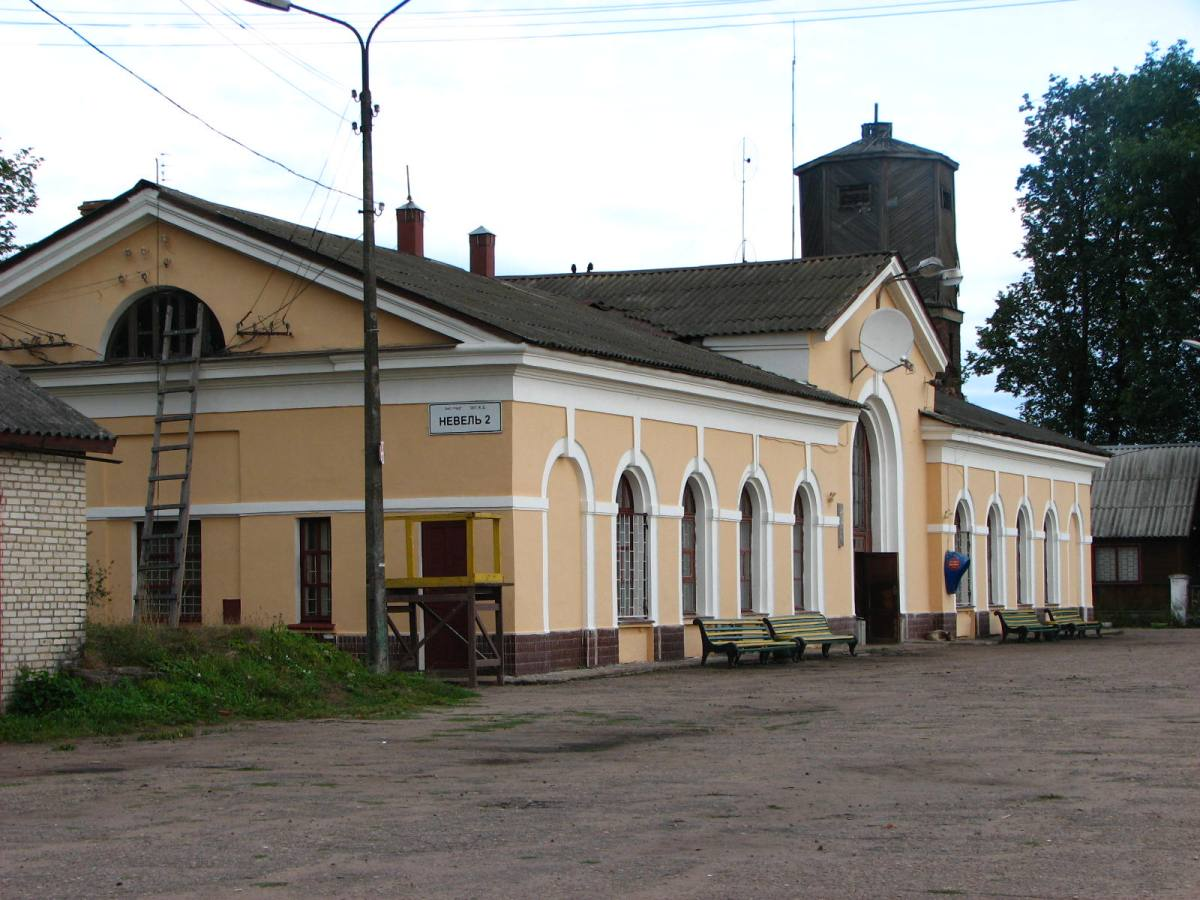
Railway station

Nevel is connected at the crossing of two railway lines. One connects Velikiye Luki with Polotsk (Nevel-1 railway station), whereas another one connects St. Petersburg via Dno and Novosokolniki with Vitebsk (Nevel-2 railway station). South of Nevel, both railways cross into Belarus.

There M20 Highway connecting St. Petersburg and Kyiv passes next to Nevel. Other main roads connect Nevel with Velikiye Luki, with Smolensk via Usvyaty and Velizh, with Polotsk, and with Verkhnyadzvinsk via Rossony. There are also local roads.

== Culture ==
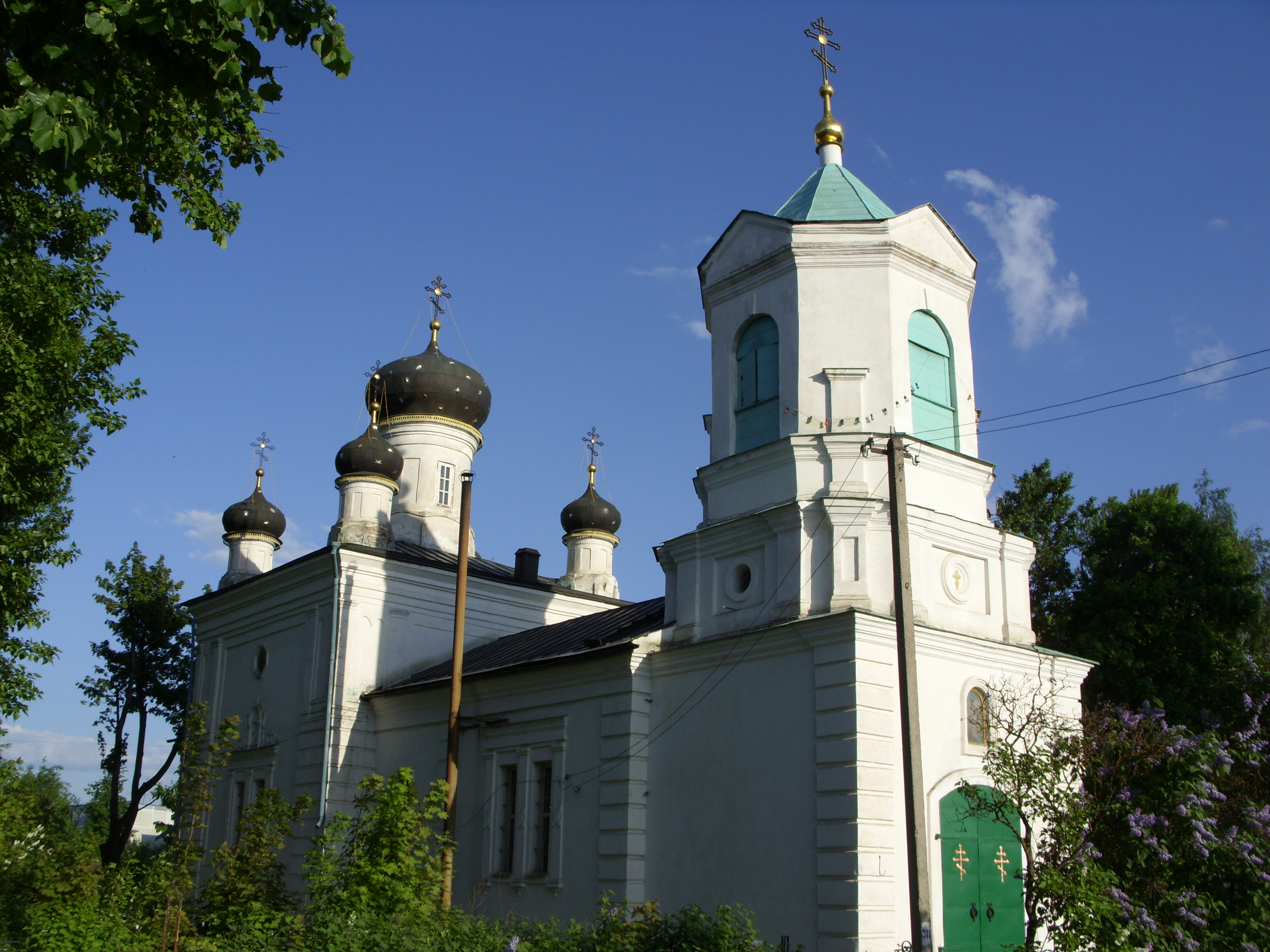
Trinity Church

Nevel contains three objects classified as cultural and historical heritage of local significance. The monuments are the Trinity Church (built in the 1850s), the building of the uyezd school, and the military cemetery from World War II.

Nevel is home to the Nevel Museum of History, featuring the history of the town.

== Notable people ==
- Mikhail Bakhtin (1895–1975) — Russian philosopher, literary critic and semiotician
- Maria Yudina (1899–1970) — Soviet pianist
- Reb Zalman Moishe (1872–1952) — Orthodox Jewish Chabad-Lubavitch Rabbi in pre-war Europe
- Yevgeny Dyakonov (1935–2006) — Russian mathematician
- Filipp Goloshchyokin (1876–1941) — Soviet politician and revolutionary
- Manshuk Mametova (1922–1943) — Soviet Kazakh machine gunner, first Soviet Asian woman to receive the Hero of the Soviet Union medal
- Aaron Rubashkin (1927/28–2020) — Jewish-American businessman
- Grigori Voitinsky (1893–1953) — Soviet politician
- Morris S. Novik (1903–1996) — American socialist politician and radio manager
- Dov Schwartzman (1921–2011) — Haredi Jewish rabbi and dean of Bais Hatalmud (Jerusalem)
- Valentin Voloshinov (1895–1936) — Russian philosopher and linguist
- Konstantin Zaslonov (1910–1942) — Soviet partisan kommander, Hero of the Soviet Union
- Boris B. Zvyagin (1921–2002) — Russian mineralogist and crystallographer
