= Dov Schwartzman =

Russian-born American Haredi rabbi (1921–2011)

Rabbi Dov Schwartzman דב שוורצמן
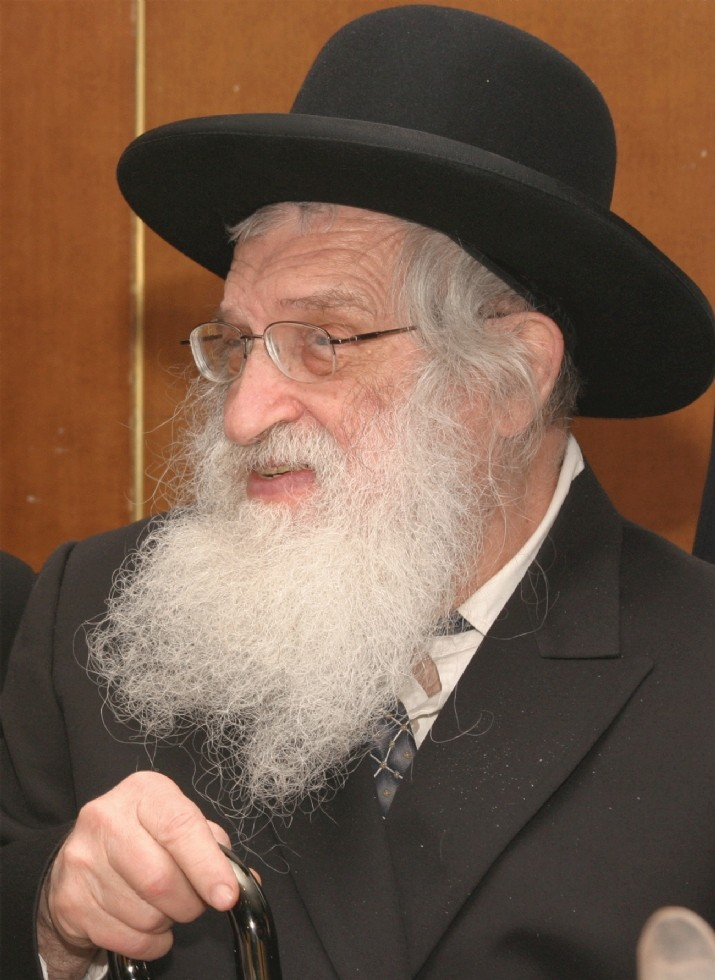

Personal life
- Born: Dov Schwartzman; 25 September 1921 Nevel, Soviet Union
- Died: 7 November 2011 (aged 90) Jerusalem, Israel
- Buried: Mount of Olives
- Parent: Rabbi Yehoshua Zev Schwartzman
- Education: Hebron Yeshiva

Religious life
- Religion: Judaism
- Denomination: Haredi
- Yeshiva: Bais Hatalmud
- Position: Rosh yeshiva
- Began: 1965
- Other: Rosh yeshiva, Talmudical Yeshiva of Philadelphia; Rosh yeshiva, Ohr Somayach
- Residence: Jerusalem

Dov Schwartzman (Hebrew: דב שוורצמן; 25 September 1921 – 7 November 2011), also called Berel Schwartzman, (Note: "Berel" is basically synonymous with "Dov", see "Dov-Ber".) was a Russian-born American Haredi Jewish rabbi, educator, Talmudic scholar, and rosh yeshiva (dean) of Bais Hatalmud, which he founded in the Sanhedria Murhevet neighborhood of Jerusalem and led for over 40 years. He also founded and led the Talmudical Yeshiva of Philadelphia together with Rabbi Shmuel Kamenetzky, and co-founded the first yeshiva in Israel for baalei teshuva (Jews who become more pious than they were raised). He taught tens of thousands of students, many of whom received semicha (rabbinic ordination) from him.

== Early life ==
Schwartzman was born in Elul 1921 in Nevel, Soviet Union, to Rabbi Yehoshua Zev Schwartzman, a graduate of the Slabodka yeshiva. In the 1930s, his family fled from Soviet Russia and immigrated to Tel Aviv, where his father was a rabbi. Schwartzman studied at Yeshivas Bais Yosef Novardok under Rabbi Yaakov Yisrael Kanievsky, known as the Steipler Gaon. In 1933, at age 12, he transferred to the Hebron Yeshiva in the Geula neighborhood of Jerusalem His mother descended from a prominent Lubavitcher family. He was named after his maternal grandfather's brother, Dovber HaYitzchoki.

Rabbi Aharon Kotler, rosh yeshiva of Beth Medrash Govoha (the Lakewood Yeshiva), chose him as a son-in-law after visiting Israel. In 1946 Schwartzman moved to the United States to marry Rabbi Kotler's daughter, Sarah Pesha, and began studying at the Lakewood Yeshiva, where he led chaburas (small-group learning sessions). The marriage ended in a contentious divorce.

In the mid-1950s, as part of Lakewood Yeshiva's effort to establish out-of-town yeshivas, Schwartzman and Rabbi Shmuel Kamenetzky were sent to head the new Talmudical Yeshiva of Philadelphia. In 1955 Schwartzman left to open his yeshiva in Israel and was replaced as rosh yeshiva by Rabbi Elya Svei. From 1961 to 1962, he was a maggid shiur (lecturer) at Yeshivas Rabbeinu Chaim Berlin.

== Israeli rosh yeshiva ==
Schwartzman moved back to Israel in the early 1960s. He established a yeshiva in Ramat HaSharon, and in 1965 founded Yeshiva Maron Tzion in the Bayit Vegan neighborhood of Jerusalem, which evolved into Yeshivat Bais HaTalmud, now located in Sanhedria Murhevet. In addition to lecturing, he traveled abroad frequently to raise funds for the yeshiva.

Schwartzman was involved in the Israeli baal teshuva movement. In the early 1970s, he co-founded the first yeshiva for baalei teshuva, Shema Yisrael, with Rabbis Mendel Weinbach, Nota Schiller, and Noach Weinberg. After this yeshiva evolved into Ohr Somayach yeshiva, Schwartzman continued as a rosh yeshiva. Schwartzman died on 7 November 2011 (10 Cheshvan 5772) and was buried at the Jewish Cemetery on the Mount of Olives in Jerusalem.

== Family ==
With his first wife, Schwartzman had three sons and three daughters. With his second wife, Yehudis Moller, whom he married in 1962, he had another son and five daughters. His eldest son, Rabbi Yaakov Eliezer Schwartzman, who is also Kotler's eldest grandson, is the rosh yeshiva of Lakewood East in Jerusalem. His second son, Rabbi Zevulun Schwartzman, heads the kollel in the Etz Chaim Yeshiva in Jerusalem, and his third son, Rabbi Isser Zalman Schwartzman, is a maggid shiur at Yeshivas Hadera in Modiin Ilit. Two of his sons-in-law, Rabbi Yeruchem Olshin and Rabbi Yisroel Neuman, are roshei yeshiva at the Lakewood Yeshiva in America.
