= Schwartzman =

Schwartzman is a surname. Notable people with the surname include:

- Diego Schwartzman, Argentine professional tennis player, formerly top-10 in the world
- Dov Schwartzman, Haredi Jewish rabbi and rosh yeshiva (dean) of Bais Hatalmud
- Jason Schwartzman, an American actor and musician
- Jesse Schwartzman, an American lacrosse player
- John Schwartzman, an American cinematographer
- Robert Carmine (previously Robert Schwartzman), American actor and musician
- Seymour Schwartzman, American cantor and opera singer
- Yaakov Eliezer Schwartzman, Orthodox Jewish rabbi and rosh yeshiva

== See also ==
- Schwarzmann for other spellings
