= Bahushewsk =

Bahushewsk Багушэўск (Belarusian) Богушевск (Russian)
- Urban-type settlement
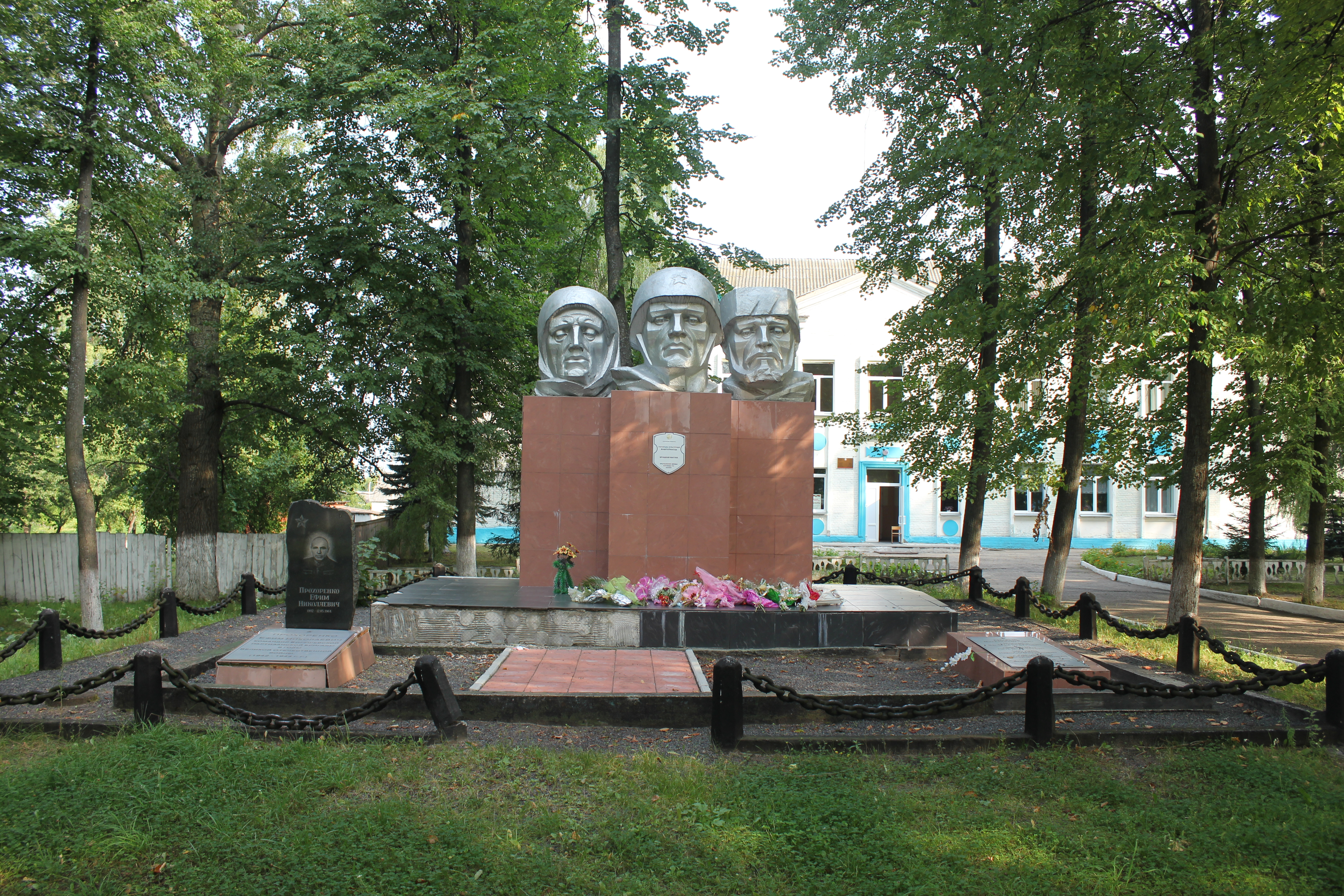

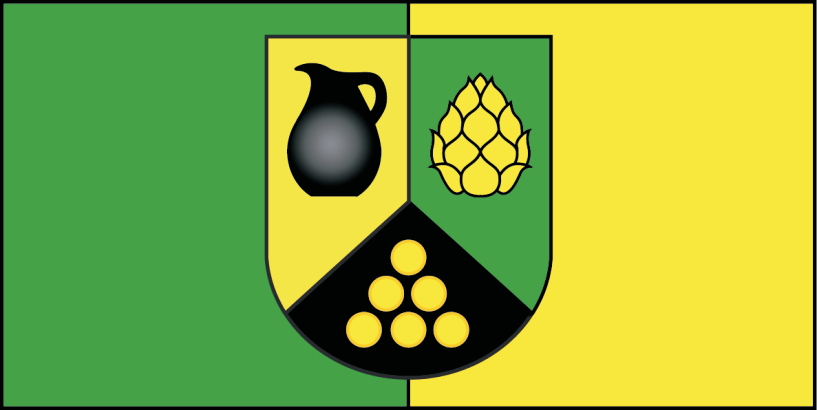
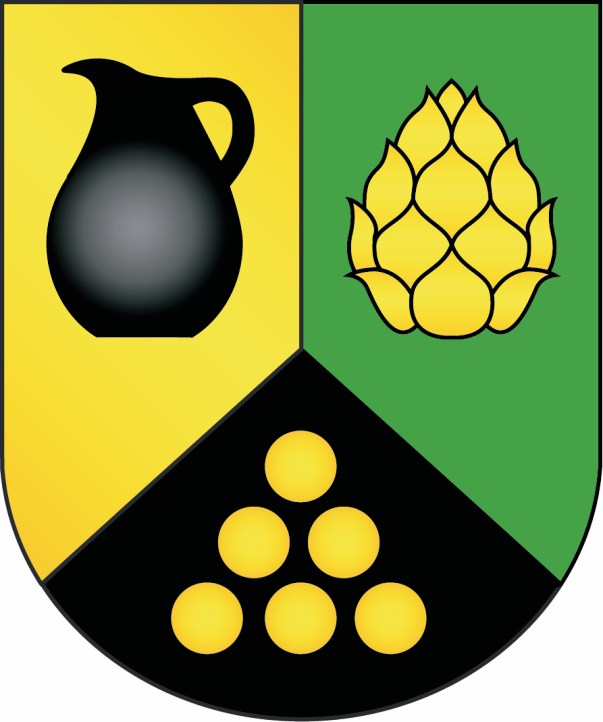
- Flag Seal

- Location within Belarus
- Coordinates: 54°50′52″N 30°12′45″E
- Country: Belarus
- Region: Vitebsk Region
- District: Syanno District
- Established: 1880

Population (2024)
  - Total: 2,303
- Time zone: UTC+3 (MSK)
- Postal code: 211510
- Area code: +375 2135

Bahushewsk (Note: BGN/PCGN romanization.) or Bogushevsk (Belarusian: Багушэўск, romanized: Bahušeŭsk; (Note: Official transliteration.) Russian: Богушевск) is an urban-type settlement in Syanno District, Vitebsk Region, Belarus. It is situated 33 kilometres (21 mi) to the east of Syanno and 48 km — 70 km by road — to the south of Vitebsk. As of 2024, it has a population of 2,303.

== Notable people ==
- Peter Abrassimov (1912–2009), Soviet war hero and ambassador in China, France, Poland and East Germany
