= Konstantin Zaslonov =

Soviet Belarusian partisan commander (1910–1942)

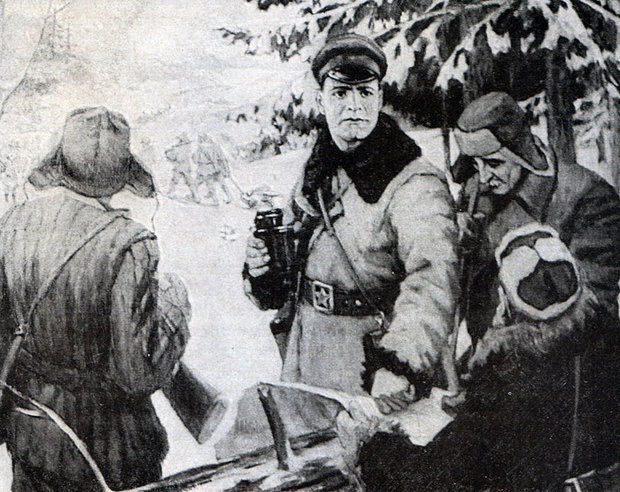
- Native name: Канстанцін Сяргеевіч Заслонаў
- Nicknames: Uncle Konstantin (Russian: Дядя Костя)
- Born: 7 January 1910; Ostashkov, Tver Governorate, Russian Empire
- Died: 14 November 1942 (aged 32) Kupovat, Byelorussian SSR, Soviet Union (now Belarus)
- Allegiance: Soviet Union
- Branch: Partisans
- Service years: 1941–1942
- Conflicts: World War II
- Awards: Hero of the Soviet Union; Order of Lenin; Medal "For Distinguished Labour"

Konstantin Sergeyevich Zaslonov (Belarusian: Канстанцін Сяргеевіч Заслонаў, romanized: Kanstancin Siarhieievič Zaslonaŭ; Russian: Константи́н Серге́евич Засло́нов), (7 January 1910 [O.S. 25 December 1909] – 14 November 1942) was a notable Belarusian partisan commander during World War II who was awarded the title of Hero of the Soviet Union for his command of partisan forces around Orsha.

== Pre-War biography ==
In 1930 he graduated from the Velikiye Luki Railroad Technical College. In 1935 he was appointed assistant chief of a motive power depot in Novosibirsk. In 1937 he transferred to Roslavl to head the Roslavl Locomotive Depot. In 1939 he headed up the Orsha Locomotive Depot.

== World War II ==
With German troops advancing and approaching Orsha, Zaslonov moved to Moscow and took a job at the Ilyich Locomotive Depot.

In October 1941 he volunteered to be deployed in the enemy-occupied territory together with several other railway workers. Once there, he created an underground guerrilla group. His nom de guerre was "Dyadya Kostya" (Uncle Konstantin). Members of the group used the so-called "coal mines" to blow up 93 German locomotives in a matter of just three months.

In March 1942, faced with the threat of an impending arrest, Zaslonov and members of his group left Orsha to set up a partisan unit. The unit conducted a number of successful combat operations in the Vitebsk — Orsha — Smolensk area resulting in multiple enemy deaths and destroyed materiel and equipment.

On 14 November 1942, Zaslonov was killed in a battle with a German death squad near Kupovat, Syanno District, Vitebsk Oblast, Belorussian SSR.

== Awards ==
- On 7 March 1943 Konstantin Zaslonov was posthumously awarded the title of the Hero of the Soviet Union for exemplary execution of the command's assignments in the fight against German occupiers and for display of valiance and show of heroism (by decree of the Presidium of the Supreme Soviet of the USSR).
- Decorated with two Orders of Lenin and multiple medals.

== Memory ==
- A monument to Konstantin Zaslonov was erected in Orsha. The Orsha Locomotive Depot was named after Zaslonov. There is another monument to Zaslonov in the square near the Ostashkov train station.
- A monument in the courtyard at school #69 in Minsk. Dark Bust on a three-meter white pedestal.
- Streets bearing Konstantin Zaslonov's name in Russia: Astrakhan, Bataysk, Belgorodе, Buzuluk, Velikiye Luki, Volgograd, Voronezh, Kazan, Kumertau, Kaliningradе, Lipetsk, Morshansk, Nizhny Novgorod, Nizhny Tagil, Novosibirsk, Omsk, Perm, St. Petersburg, Stavropol, Tver, Tyumen, Ufa, Khabarovsk, Chelyabinsk, Rozhnovka khutor, Odintsovo Raion, Moscow Oblast; in Ukraine: Alchevsk, Berdiansk, Brovary, Horlivka, Zolotonosha, Dnipropetrovsk, Donetsk, Zaporizhia, Kiev, Kropyvnytskyi, Podilsk, Kramatorsk, Kryvyi Rih, Mariupol, Makiivka, Shakhtarsk, Smila, Sumy; in Belarus: Baranavichy, Babruysk, Bykhaw, Vitebsk, Salihorsk, Syanno, Minsk, Mazyr, Orsha.
