= Asher Wade =

American-born Israeli lecturer and psychotherapist

Rabbi Asher Wade
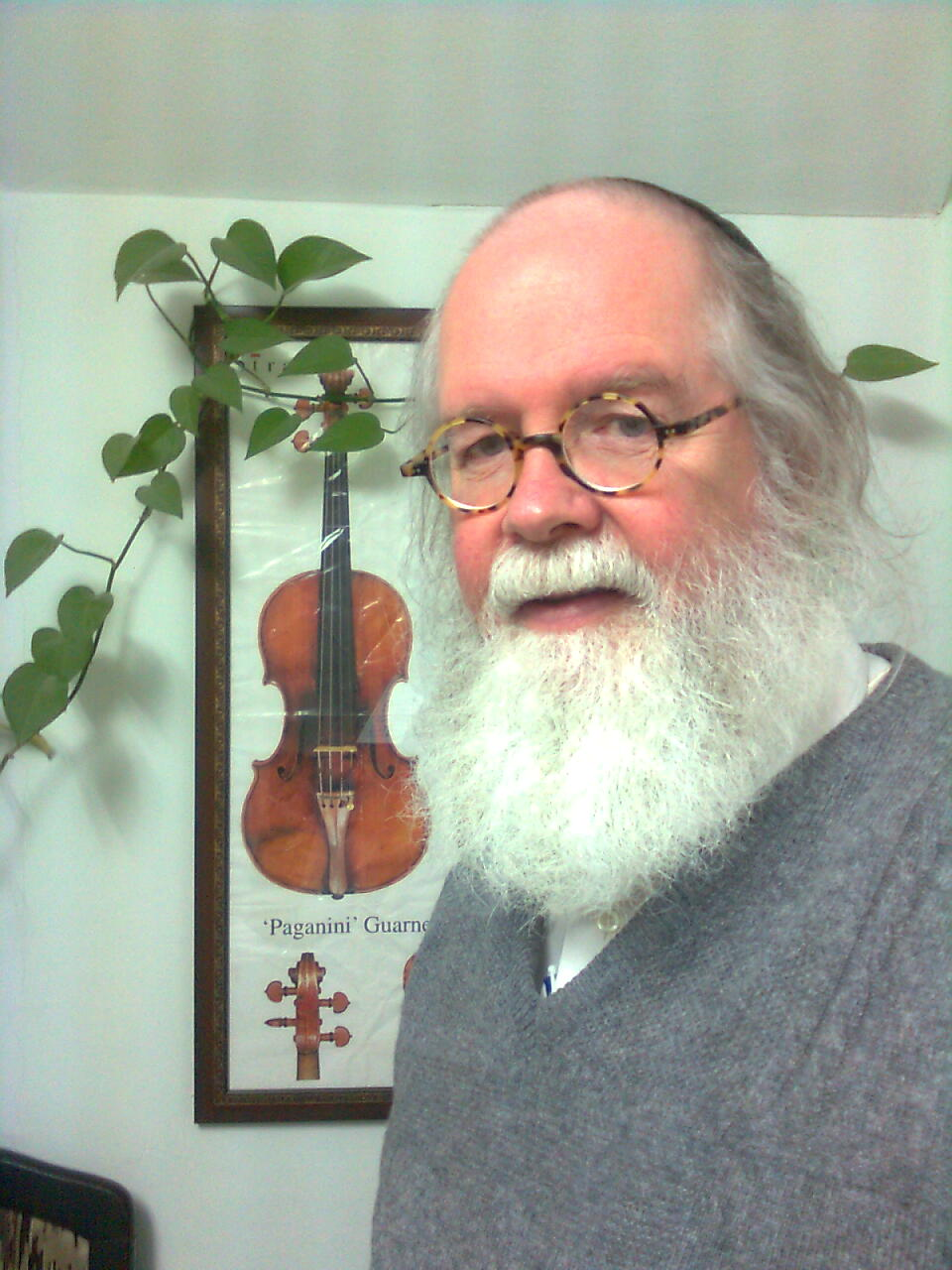
- Wade in 2013

Personal life
- Born: Wallace S. Wade; May 31, 1949 (age 77) Danville, Virginia
- Occupation: Psychotherapist
- Website: www.asherwade.com

Religious life
- Religion: Judaism
- Denomination: Orthodox Judaism

Jewish leader
- Residence: Jerusalem
- Semikhah: Ohr Somayach, Jerusalem

Asher Wade (born Wallace S. Wade) is an American-born international lecturer, college instructor and psychotherapist. Wade was a Methodist minister before converting to Orthodox Judaism and later becoming a rabbi.

== Biography ==
As an ordained Methodist minister, Wade and his wife were moved by the articles in a Sunday morning newspaper commemorating the 40th anniversary of Kristallnacht. At that time, he was attending the University of Hamburg in Germany working towards his doctorate in metaphysics and relativity.

He had already earned a B.A. in philosophy in the United States and a master's degree in Philosophical Theology at the University of Edinburgh in Scotland. In addition, he had previously interned as an adolescent and marriage counselor at the U.S. Army Chaplaincy Center in Berlin while he was attending the Goethe Institute for German studies.

== Conversion ==
Wade and his wife then began to study Jewish history and the Jewish religion, especially vis-a-vis Christianity. After about a year and a half of study, they both decided to pursue conversion to Judaism. This caused a stir, not only within the Church, but also among his professors at university, primarily with his doctoral supervisor, who, it turned out, had been a chaplain in one of Hitler's tank divisions in Poland during World War II. This professor thwarted the completion of his doctoral program.

Several months later, Wade obtained the support of a younger professor, who apparently had no qualms with their conversion to Judaism. Although he was forced to drop his prior research studies as a condition for this support, Wade happily began research in a fully Jewish topic, Samson Raphael Hirsch and the Orthodox-Reform Debate. About two years later, having undertaken expensive research trips to New York, as well as having written up his first rough-draft, his second supervisor mysteriously withdrew his support of his doctoral program, which left Wade with two dissertations written but disallowed from taking the oral exams for completion. The Wades eventually converted to orthodox Judaism in Frankfurt-am-Main in May, 1983 and, shortly thereafter, moved to the United States.

== Ordination ==
While living in America, they were contacted by Ner Israel Rabbinical College in Baltimore. This meeting, chaired by Herman N. Neuberger, led to him and his family being sent in 1988 to Jerusalem where he learned for a number of years at Yeshiva Ohr Somayach. Wade was ordained as a rabbi in December 1992 and worked at The Heritage House in the Old City of Jerusalem, Ohr Somayach as well as Aish HaTorah for many years.

In 2004, Wade completed a professional doctoral degree in clinical psychology through Southern California University for Professional Studies. Today Wade lives in Jerusalem with their six children where he lectures at yeshivas and seminaries, teaches at Touro College and has a private practice in clinical psychology.
