= Yitzchak Breitowitz =

American Rabbi and former law professor

Rabbi Yitzchak Breitowitz
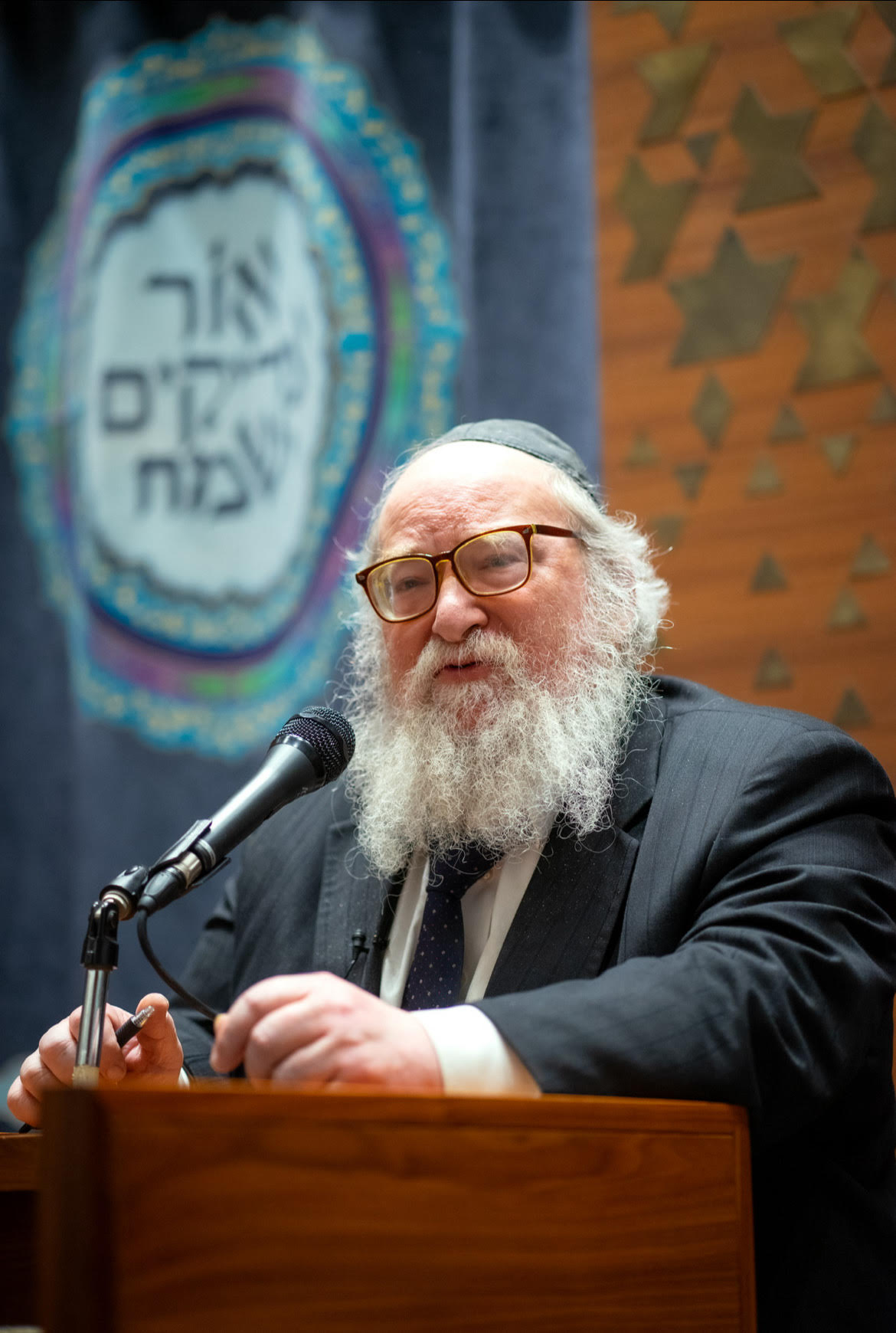
- Breitowitz speaks at Ohr Somayach, 2023

Personal life
- Born: Irving Breitowitz; 1954 (age 71–72) New York
- Education: Harvard Law School

Religious life
- Religion: Judaism

Jewish leader
- Yeshiva: Ner Yisrael, Ohr Somayach

Yitzchak (Irving) Breitowitz is an American-born Orthodox rabbi and lawyer. He is the Rabbi Emeritus of Woodside Synagogue Ahavas Torah in Silver Spring, Maryland, and the Rav of Kehillas Ohr Somayach, and lecturer at Ohr Somayach in Jerusalem.

== Early life and education ==
Breitowitz was born in April 1954 in New York, to Holocaust survivors David and Helen Breitowitz.

Breitowitz grew up in the Greater Hartford, Connecticut area. He attended Ner Israel Yeshiva in Baltimore. He received his bachelor of Arts from Johns Hopkins University and his Juris Doctor at Harvard Law School in 1979. In 1979 he obtained rabbinic ordination from Ner Israel Rabbinical College.

== Career ==
After graduating Breitowitz worked in private practice in Chicago where he also was law clerk for Susan Getzendanner of the U.S. District Court for the Northern District of Illinois and taught at the Chicago-Kent College of Law and at the University of Illinois.

Breitowitz returned to Baltimore in 1983 he joined the faculty of the University of Maryland School of Law as an associate professor of law, specializing in bankruptcy, commercial law and bioethics. In 2001 Breitowitz was named "Outstanding Teacher of the Year" by the University.

He was the rabbi of Woodside Synagogue Ahavas Torah in Silver Spring, Maryland for 22 years starting in 1988.

In April 2010 Breitowitz moved to Israel where he became a senior lecturer in Ohr Somayach Yeshiva in Jerusalem and the rabbi of Kehillas Ohr Somayach.

== Personal life ==
Breitowitz is married to Sally Naiman. They have one son.

== Select bibliography ==
- "Between Civil and Religious Law: The Plight of the Agunah in American Society" (Praeger, July 20, 1993, ISSN 0147-1074, ISBN 978-0-313-28471-7)

== See also ==
- Ohr Somayach, Jerusalem
