= Nevelsky District, Pskov Oblast =

Nevelsky District Невельский район (Russian)
- District
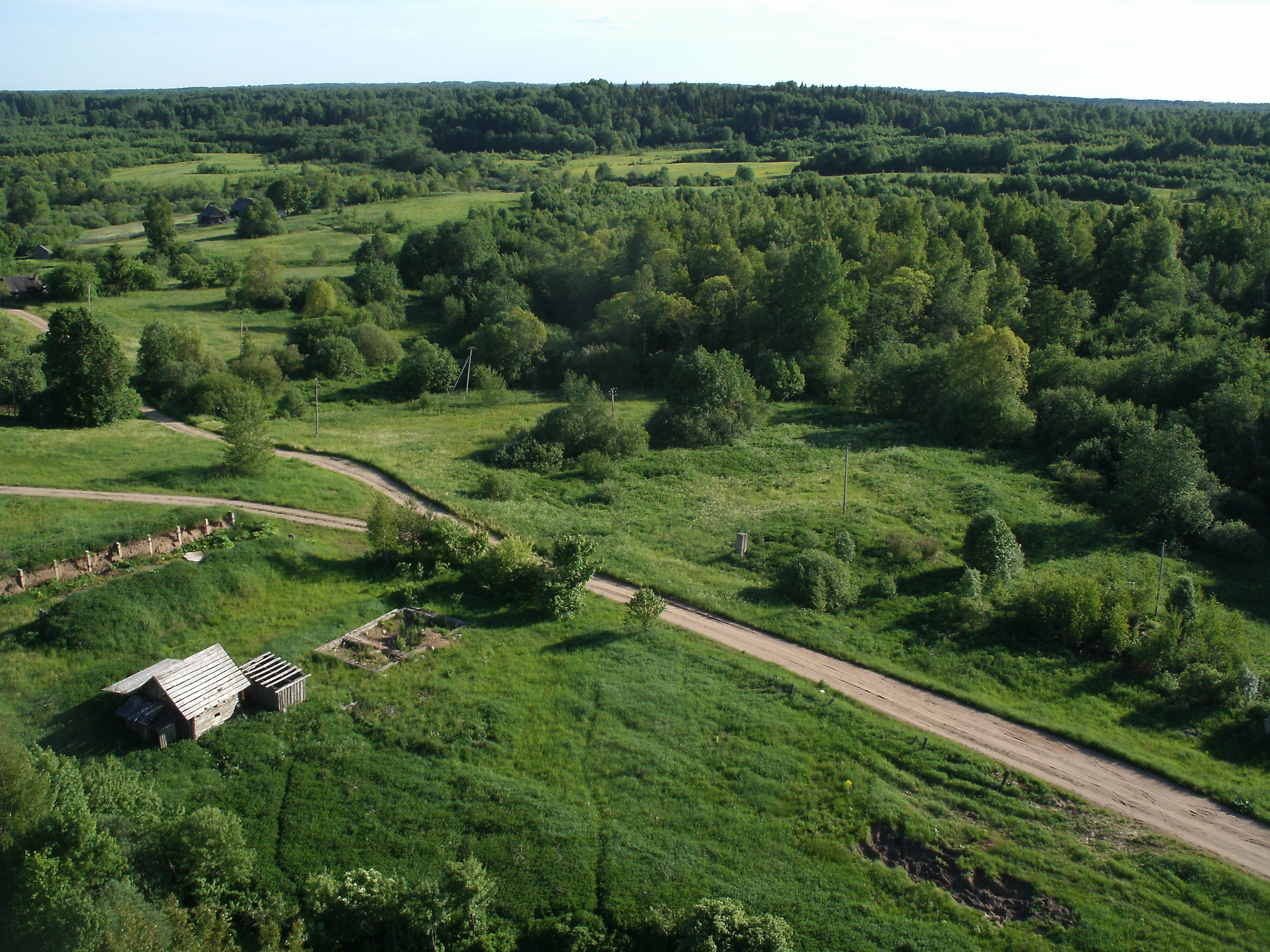
- landscape in Nevelsky District

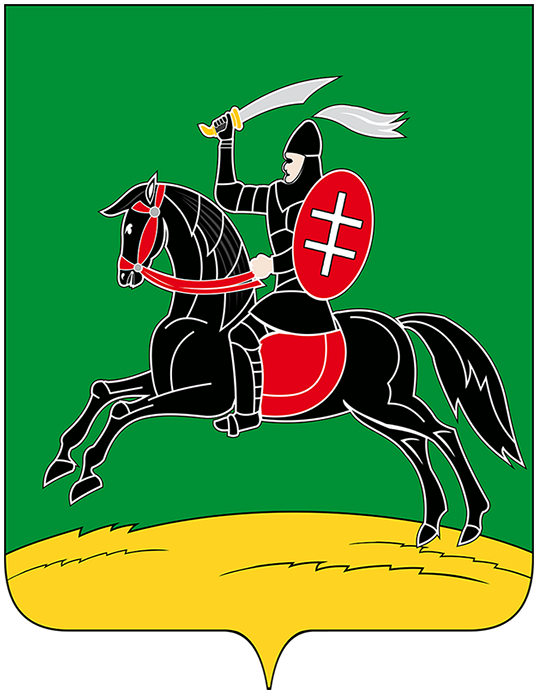
- Flag Coat of arms
- Location of Nevelsky District in Pskov Oblast
- Coordinates: 56°01′N 29°56′E
- Country: Russia
- Federal subject: Pskov Oblast
- Established: 1 August 1927
- Administrative center: Nevel

Area
  - Total: 2,689.9 km^{2} (1,038.6 sq mi)

Population (2010 Census)
  - Total: 26,657
  - Density: 9.9100/km^{2} (25.667/sq mi)
  - Urban: 61.2%
  - Rural: 38.8%

Administrative structure
  - Inhabited localities: 1 cities/towns, 489 rural localities

Municipal structure
  - Municipally incorporated as: Nevelsky Municipal District
  - Municipal divisions: 1 urban settlements, 10 rural settlements
- Time zone: UTC+3 (MSK)
- OKTMO ID: 58620000
- Website: http://nevel.reg60.ru/

Nevelsky District (Russian: Не́вельский райо́н) is an administrative and municipal district (raion), one of the twenty-four in Pskov Oblast, Russia. It is located in the south of the oblast and borders with Novosokolnichesky District in the north, Velikoluksky District in the east, Usvyatsky District in the southeast, Haradok, Polotsk, and Rasony Districts of Vitebsk Region of Belarus in the south (forming part of the Belarus–Russia border), Sebezhsky District in the west, and with Pustoshkinsky District in the northwest. The area of the district is 2,689.9 square kilometers (1,038.6 sq mi). Its administrative center is the town of Nevel. Population: 26,657 (2010 census); 31,419 (2002 Census); 38,951 (1989 Soviet census). The population of Nevel accounts for 61.2% of the district's total population.

== Geography ==
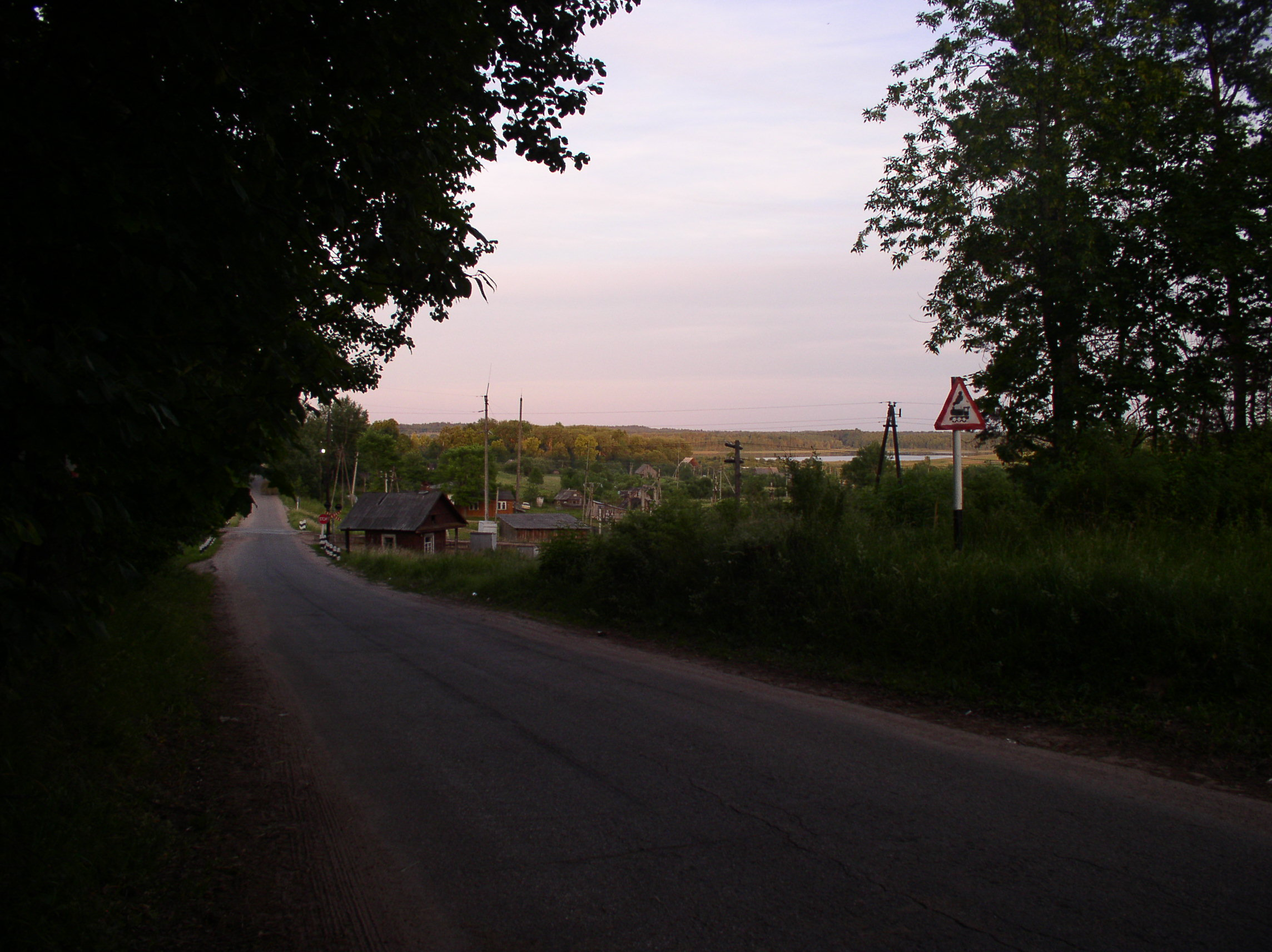
The village of Turichino

The territory of the district is split between the basins of the Lovat and Daugava Rivers. The upper course of the Lovat flows close to the boundaries of the district and the rivers in the eastern part of the district drain into the Lovat. The western part of the district lies in the basin of the Daugava (the Western Dvina). The main river of this basin inside the district is the Ushcha.

There are many lakes in the district, including Lake Nevel, on the shore of which the town of Nevel is located, Lake Bolshoy Ivan, Lake Usvoya, Lake Zaverezhye, and Lake Sennitsa.

== History ==
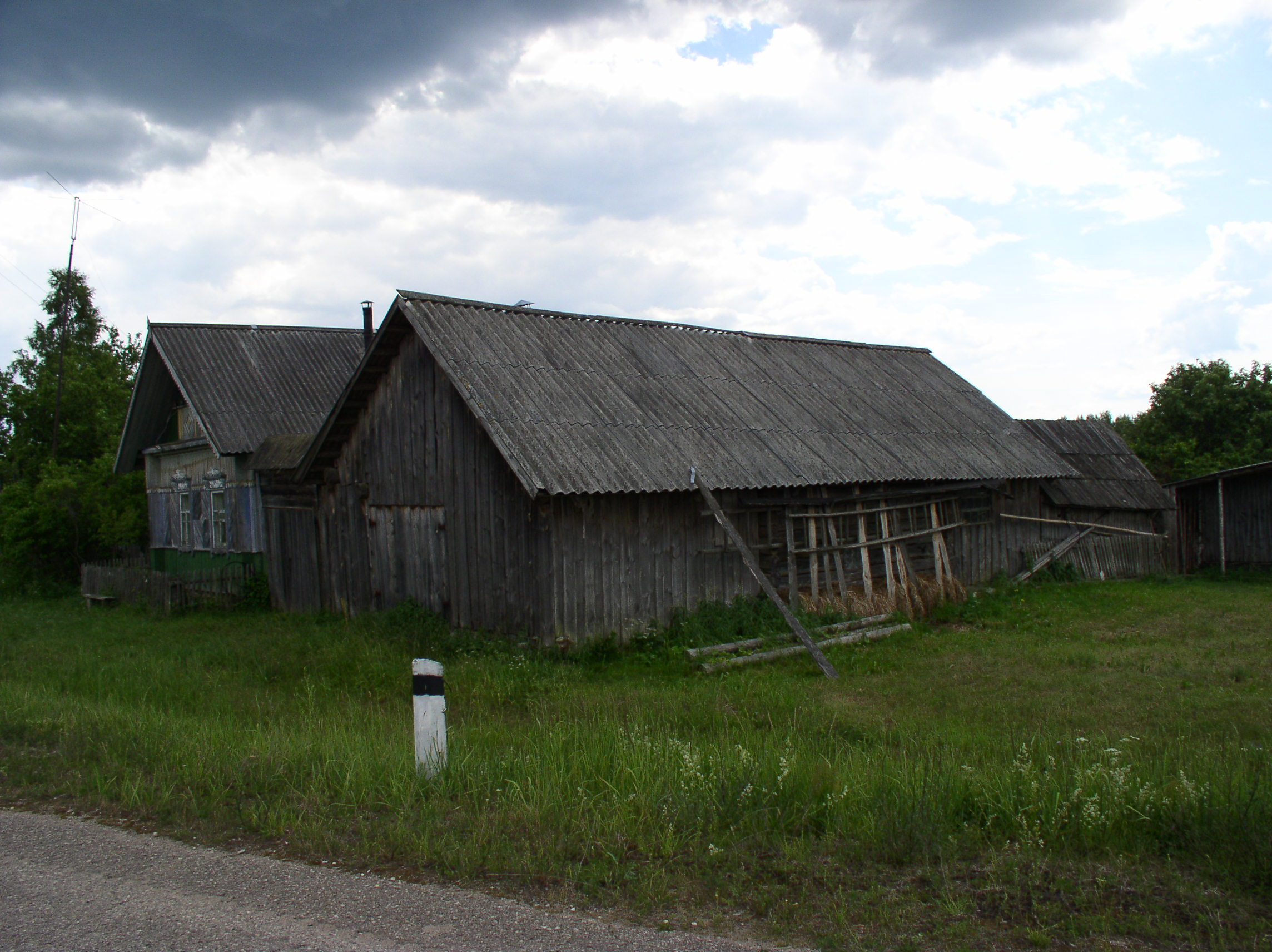
Wooden houses in the village of Kovalikha

Nevel was founded in the 16th century and first mentioned in 1580. The region was changing hands multiple times between Russia and Poland; eventually it went to Poland and stayed there until Poland's First Partition in 1772, when it was included into newly established Pskov Governorate, a giant administrative unit comprising what is currently Pskov Oblast and a considerable part of Belarus. In 1773, Nevel was chartered, and the territory was organized as Nevesky Uyezd of Pskov Governorate. In 1777, it was transferred to Polotsk Viceroyalty. In 1796, the viceroyalty was abolished and the territory was transferred to Belarus Governorate; since 1802 to Vitebsk Governorate. After 1919, Vitebsk Governorate was a part of the Russian Soviet Federative Socialist Republic. In 1924, Vitebsk Governorate was abolished and Nevelsky Uyezd was transferred to Pskov Governorate.

On August 1, 1927, the uyezds were abolished and Nevelsky District was established, with the administrative center in the town of Nevel. It included parts of former Nevelsky Uyezd. Pskov Governorate was abolished as well, and the district became a part of Velikiye Luki Okrug of Leningrad Oblast. On June 17, 1929, Nevelsky District was transferred to Western Oblast. On July 23, 1930, the okrugs were also abolished and the districts were directly subordinated to the oblast. On January 29, 1935, the district was transferred to Kalinin Oblast and on February 5 of the same year, Nevelsky District became a part of Velikiye Luki Okrug of Kalinin Oblast, one of the okrugs abutting the state boundaries of the Soviet Union. On May 4, 1938, the district was subordinated directly to the oblast. Between 1941 and 1944, Nevelsky District was occupied by German troops. On August 22, 1944, the district was transferred to newly established Velikiye Luki Oblast. On October 2, 1957, Velikiye Luki Oblast was abolished and Nevelsky District was transferred to Pskov Oblast.

On August 1, 1927, Porechyevsky District with the administrative center in the selo of Porechye was created on the territories which previously belonged to Nevelsky Uyezd. It was a part of Velikiye Luki Okrug of Leningrad Oblast. On June 17, 1929, the district was transferred to Western Oblast and on September 20, 1930, Porechyevsky District was abolished and split between Velikoluksky, Nevelsky, and Usvyatsky Districts. On March 10, 1945, it was re-established as Porechensky District, a part of Velikiye Luki Oblast, from the territories belonging to Velikoluksky and Nevelsky Districts. On October 2, 1957, the district was transferred to Pskov Oblast. On March 23, 1959, Porechensky District was abolished and merged into Velikoluksky District.

On December 10, 1928, Ust-Dolyssky District with the administrative center in the village of Ust-Dolyssy was created on the territories which previously belonged to Pustoshkinsky and Nevelsky Districts. It was a part of Velikiye Luki Okrug of Leningrad Oblast. On June 17, 1929, the district was transferred to Western Oblast and on September 20, 1930, Ust-Dolyssky District was abolished and split between Nevelsky and Pustoshkinsky Districts. On February 5, 1952, it was re-established as a part of Velikiye Luki Oblast; on October 2, 1957, the district was transferred to Pskov Oblast. On March 23, 1959, Ust-Dolyssky District was abolished and split between Nevelsky and Pustoshkinsky Districts.

== Economy ==
=== Industry ===
The district has enterprises of food, textile, shoe-making, and timber industries.

=== Agriculture ===
Eight large- and mid-size farms operate in the district, as well as a number of small-scale farms. The main agricultural specializations in Nevelsky District are meat and milk production, as well as crops growing.

=== Transportation ===
Nevel is located at the crossing of two railway lines. One connects Velikiye Luki with Polotsk, whereas another one connects St. Petersburg via Dno and Novosokolniki with Vitebsk. South of Nevel both railways cross into Belarus.

The M20 Highway connecting St. Petersburg and Kiev crosses the district from north to south. Other main roads connect Nevel with Velikiye Luki, with Smolensk via Usvyaty and Velizh, with Polotsk, and with Verkhnyadzvinsk via Rossony. The whole stretch between Nevel and Velizh has been a toll road since 2002. There are also local roads.

== Culture and recreation ==
The district contains seven objects classified as cultural and historical heritage of federal significance and eighty-eight monuments of local significance. The federal monuments are the wooden church of Saint Spirit in the village of Plissy, the church of John the Baptist in the former Mikhelson Estate, and five archeological sites.

Nevel hosts the Nevel Museum of History, featuring the history of the town. It is the only state museum in the district.
