= Schvartzman =

Schvartzman is a surname. Notable people with the surname include:

- Aron Schvartzman (also Aarón Schvartzman and Aron Schwartzman) (1908–2013), Argentine chess master
- Carlos Schvartzman (1947–2025), Paraguayan pianist, guitarist, composer, arranger and orchestrator of jazz and contemporary music

== See also ==
- Schwarzmann for other spellings
