= Schwarzmann =

Schwarzmann is a surname of German origin. Notable people with the surname include:

- Alfred Schwarzmann (1912–2000), German gymnast
- Herman J. Schwarzmann (1846–1891), American architect
- Stefan Schwarzmann (born 1965), German drummer

== See also ==
- Schwarzman
- Schwartzmann
- Schwartzman
- Shvartsman
- Schvartzman
