= Lakewood East =

Coordinates: 31°49′23.08″N 35°11′37.6″E

- Hebrew: בית מדרש גבוה דאמריקא בארץ ישראל לייקווד
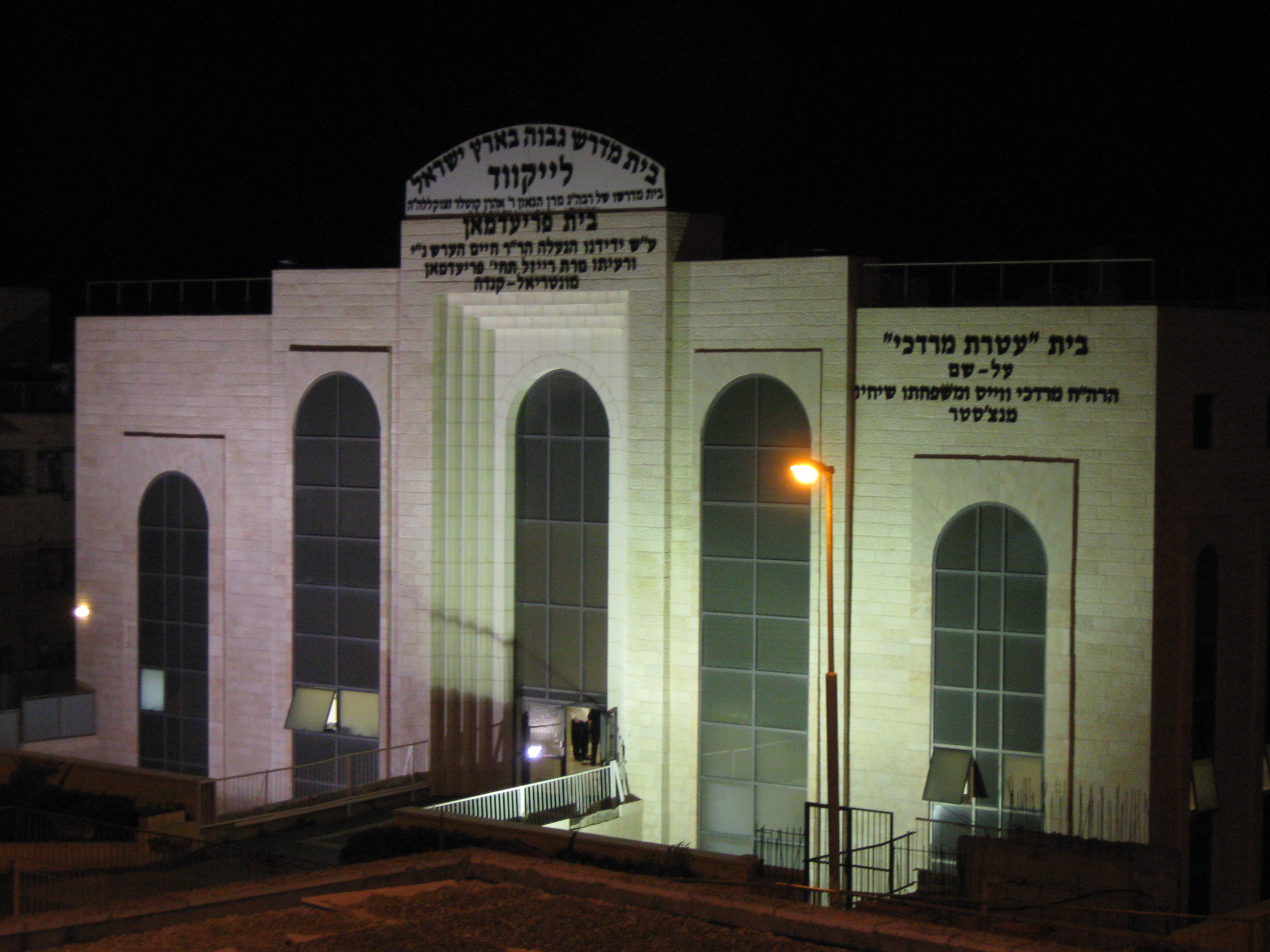

Location
- 32 Rubin St. Ramot; Jerusalem

Information
- Established: 2004
- Rosh Yeshiva: Rabbi Yaakov Eliezer Schwartzman
- Affiliation: Orthodox

Lakewood East, officially Beth Medrash Govoha of America in Eretz Yisroel (בית מדרש גבוה דאמריקא בארץ ישראל), is a yeshiva in Jerusalem, headed by Rabbi Yaakov Eliezer Schwartzman, son of Rabbi Dov Schwartzman and the eldest grandson of Rabbi Aharon Kotler, founder of the Lakewood Yeshiva. It is officially a branch of the American yeshiva. The Mashgiach is currently Rabbi Rachamim Raymond.

== History ==
The Jerusalem branch first opened in the Kiryat Itri neighborhood of West Jerusalem. In 2004, it moved to its present location in the neighborhood of Ramot. It is composed of a senior beit medrash for post-graduate-level yeshiva students, along with a kollel.

In early 2015, the "Lakewood East" absorbed 28 Israeli students and gave them their own section of the yeshiva. The Israeli section has since grown and by June 2015 there were 44 students.

Rabbi Shlomo Wolbe, father-in-law of Rabbi Schwartzman, was the mashgiach ruchani of Lakewood East until his death in April 2005.
