= Lake Sennitsa =

- Сенница (Russian)
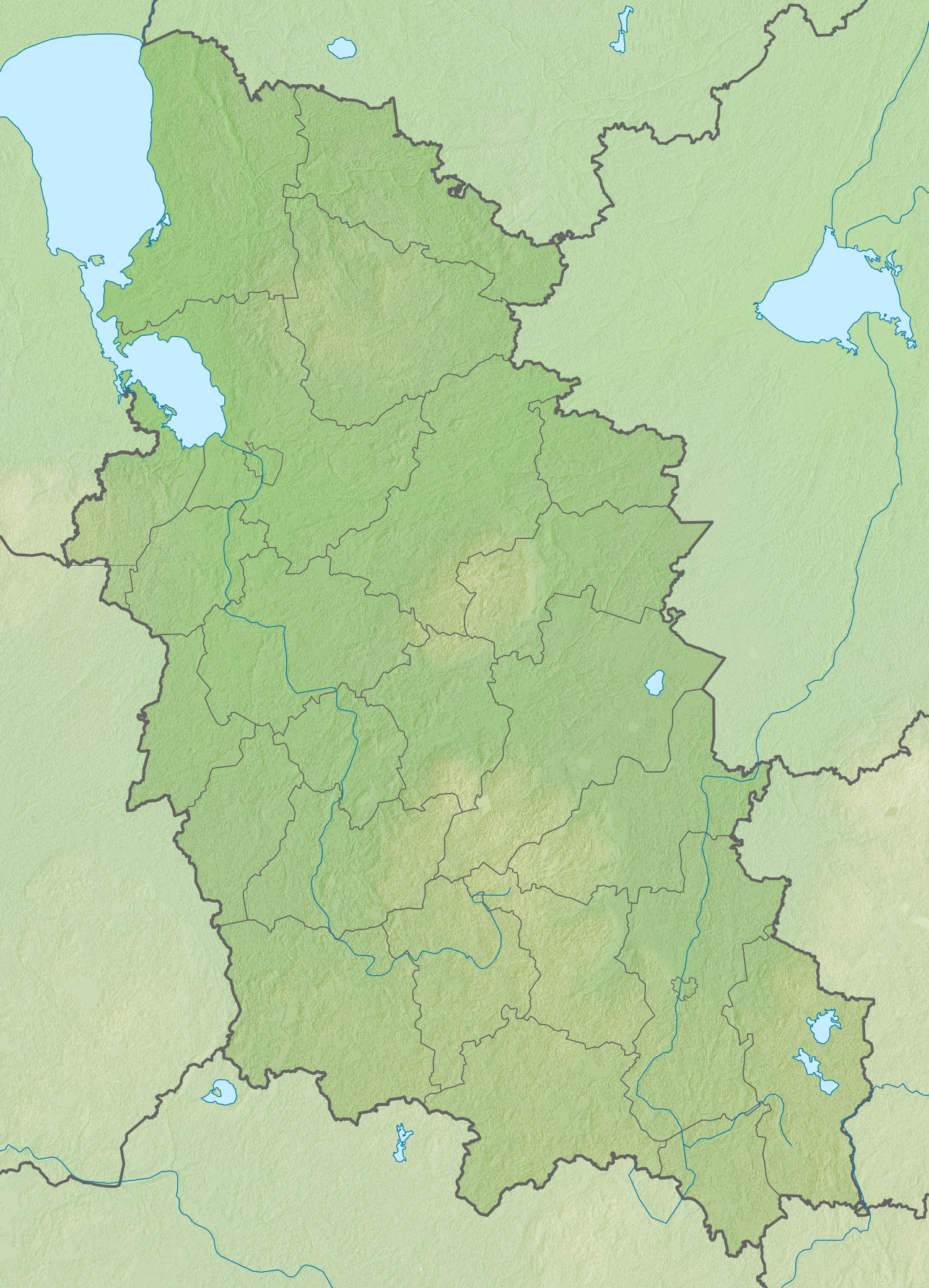
- Location within Pskov Oblast
- Location: Pskov Oblast
- Coordinates: 55°49′47″N 30°23′12″E
- Primary outflows: Sennitsa River
- Basin countries: Russia, Belarus
- Surface area: 9.62 square kilometres (3.71 mi^{2})
- Average depth: 1.53 m (5 ft 0 in)
- Max. depth: 3.60 m (11.8 ft)

Lake Sennitsa (Russian: Сенница) is a sweetwater lake in Nevelsky District of Pskov Oblast, Russia adjacent to the Belarus–Russia border. It is the source of the Sennitsa River, a left tributary of the Lovat River in the drainage basin of the Neva. The village of Dubokray is located at the lakeside. The southern coast of the lake makes the border between Russia and Belarus. The eastern coast makes the border between Nevelsky and Usvyatsky Districts.

The area of the lake is 9.62 square kilometres (3.71 mi^{2}). The average depth is 1.53 metres (5.0 ft), while the deepest area is 3.60 metres (11.8 ft). There are fourteen species of fish living in the lake including the northern pike and the European perch.
