= Mendel Weinbach =

Rabbi Mendel Weinbach מנדל וינבך
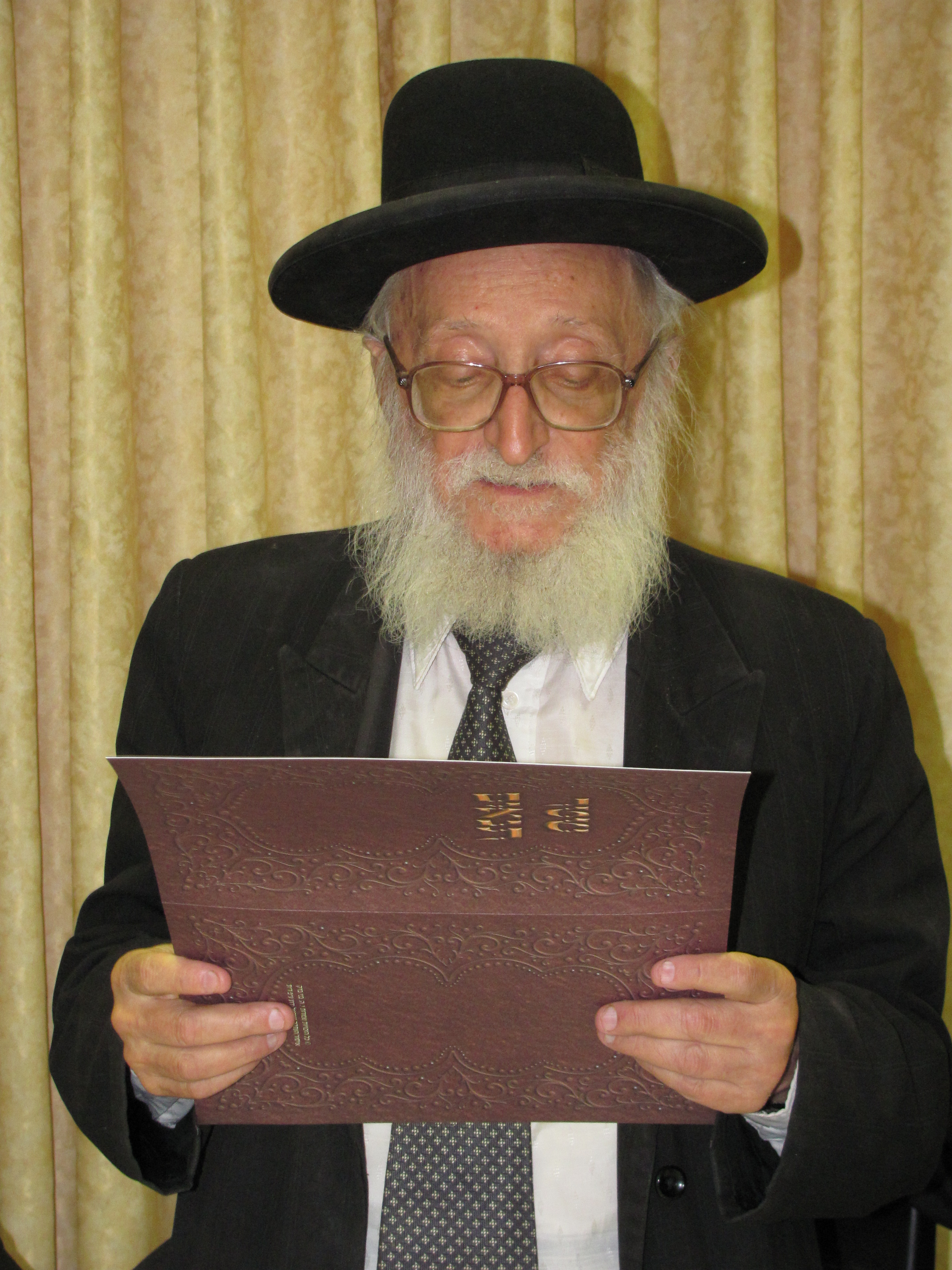
- Rabbi Mendel Weinbach in 2010

Personal life
- Born: Chona Menachem Mendel Weinbach; September 24, 1933 Kańczuga, Galicia
- Died: December 11, 2012 (aged 79) Jerusalem, Israel
- Buried: Har HaMenuchot
- Spouse: Sylvie (Shaindel) Lamm
- Children: 6 sons 6 daughters
- Parent(s): Yechezkel Shraga and Tshezye Genendel Weinbach
- Education: Yeshiva Torah Vodaas

Religious life
- Religion: Judaism
- Denomination: Orthodox Judaism

Jewish leader
- Position: Rosh yeshiva
- Yeshiva: Ohr Somayach
- Began: 1970
- Ended: 2012
- Yahrtzeit: 27 Kislev, 5773
- Residence: Kiryat Mattersdorf
- Semikhah: Yeshiva Torah Vodaas

Chona Menachem Mendel (Mendel) Weinbach (Hebrew: מנדל וינבך; September 24, 1933 – December 11, 2012) was an Orthodox Jewish rabbi, educator, author, and speaker. As the co-founder and dean of Ohr Somayach Institutions, a Jerusalem-based yeshiva for newly-observant Jewish men, he was considered one of the fathers of the modern-day baal teshuva movement.

== Early life ==
Chona Menachem Mendel Weinbach was born in Kańczuga, Galicia, to Yechezkel Shraga and Tshezye Genendel Weinbach. At the age of 4 he immigrated with his parents to America and settled in Pittsburgh, Pennsylvania, where he grew up. At age 12 he left home to learn in Yeshiva Torah Vodaas, where he studied under Rabbis Yaakov Kamenetsky and Gedalia Schorr. He received rabbinic ordination at Torah Vodaath.

In 1953 Weinbach was one of 10 Torah Vodaath students recruited by Rabbi Simcha Wasserman to open a Beth midrash in Los Angeles to generate interest among parents in Wasserman's proposal to open a mesivta high school in that city. At the end of the summer, he went to study at Beis Medrash Elyon in Monsey, New York.

In 1960 he married Sylvie (Sheindel) Lamm (b. 1941), a Belgian war orphan who had come to New York at the age of 5. She and her parents, Abraham Israel and Rachel Lamm, had been interned in the Mechelen transit camp in 1942. She had been liberated on 13 January 1944 and sent to a Jewish orphanage; her parents were deported to Auschwitz two days later. She was raised by her uncle and aunt in New York City. In 1962 the couple decided to settle in Israel, becoming one of the first American Orthodox Jewish families to do so. They were one of the first families to settle in the new neighborhood of Kiryat Mattersdorf in northern Jerusalem, where they raised 12 children.

== Teaching career ==
In his early years in Israel, Weinbach studied in the Mir yeshiva and opened a kollel. He also established yeshivas in Givat Ada and Netanya, and became involved with American P'eylim, which was opening yeshivas and Talmud Torahs for new immigrants. He was a member of a group of avreichim (married Torah students) from the Mir, Brisk, Hebron and other yeshivas who volunteered to study with new immigrants who did not fit into regular Israeli yeshivas. Around 1965 Weinbach decided to open a yeshiva for baalei teshuva together with Rabbi Meir Schuster. Rabbis in the yeshiva, located in the Talpiot neighborhood of Jerusalem, included Rabbi Shimshon Dovid Pincus and Rabbi Yoel Schwartz. The yeshiva was forced to close due to the Six-Day War in 1967.

=== Yeshivas Ohr Somayach ===
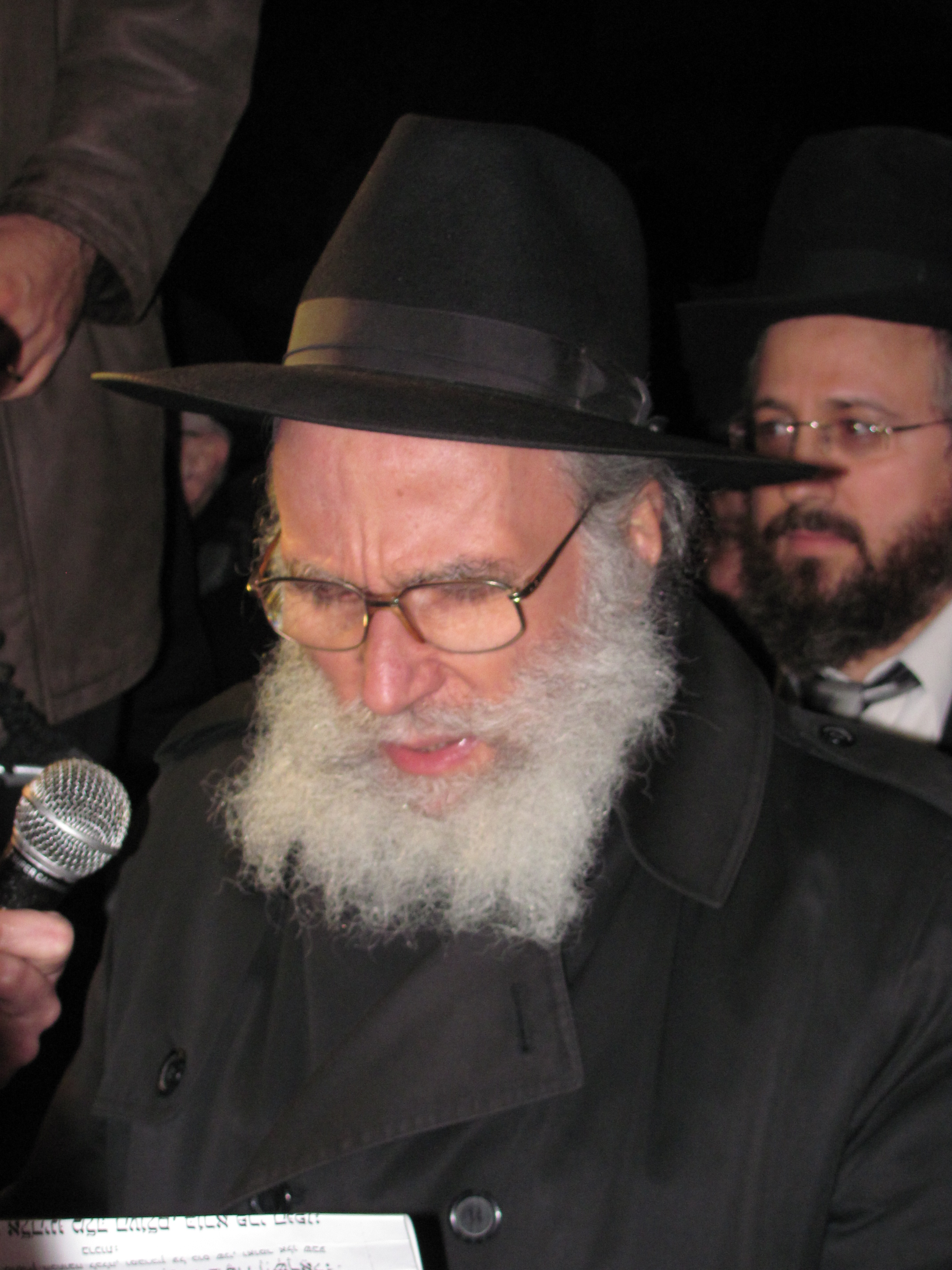
Rabbi Nota Schiller, co-founder and rosh yeshiva of Yeshivas Ohr Somayach.

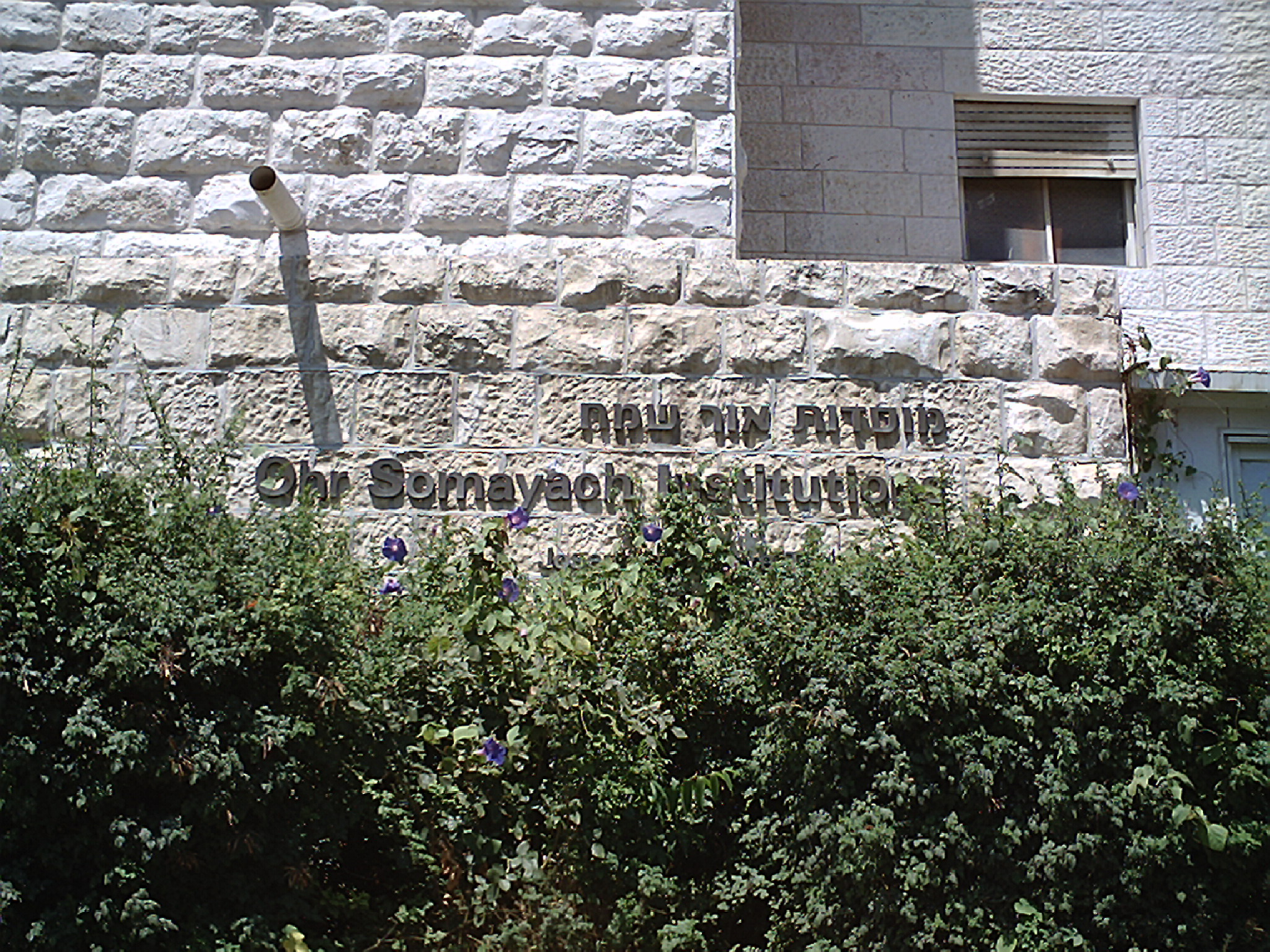
Ohr Somayach, Jerusalem entrance sign

In 1972 Weinbach and Rabbis Nota Schiller, Noah Weinberg, and Yaakov Rosenberg established Shema Yisrael Yeshiva to attract young, English-speaking Jewish men with little or no background in Jewish studies. After a few years, Weinberg left the yeshiva over a difference in philosophy and founded Aish HaTorah in 1974. Shema Yisrael subsequently changed its name to Ohr Somayach (after the commentary on the Mishneh Torah written by Rabbi Meir Simcha of Dvinsk), in response to critics who contended that the name Shema Yisrael belonged to the entire Jewish people rather than a single institution. Weinbach and Schiller continued on as rosh yeshivas, developing the program into a Talmud study program with the goal of facilitating the adoption of Orthodox practices among formerly secular Jewish students integrate into Orthodox Jewish communities. Other Torah scholars invited to serve as rosh yeshivas over the years included Rabbi Dov Schwartzman and Rabbi Aharon Feldman.

Weinbach oversaw the growth of Ohr Somayach into different branches, beginning with the 1984 establishment of its Israeli division. Later branches were established in the United States, Canada, England, South Africa and Ukraine. Weinbach also oversaw the development of several successful kiruv initiatives, including the Jewish Learning Exchange (JLE), a summer learning course for young men from overseas; the Ohr Lagolah teacher-training program; and the Mentors Mission, which brings American Jews to Israeli for kiruv activities.

Weinberg taught at Ohr Somayach from its founding in 1970 until his death in 2012.

== Other activities ==
Weinbach delivered a shiur every Tisha B'Av that lasted two to three hours. He also spoke at women's events such as the annual Shmiras Halashon Rally, and at the Mercaz Bais Yaakov high school and seminary in Geula, which he co-founded with Rabbi Yeshaya Lieberman.

In the 1970s he wrote articles for The Jewish Press under a pseudonym and also ghostwrote columns for Prime Minister of Israel Menachem Begin and Member of Knesset Rabbi Menachem Porush. Later, under his own name, he wrote articles for The Jewish Observer and wrote and edited English-language books on a variety of topics, including the Land of Israel, Jewish prayer, and the writings of the Chofetz Chaim. Shortly before his death he completed a two-year project, The Essential Malbim on Chumash and Nach.

In his last years, Weinbach taught a daily Daf Yomi shiur in Kiryat Mattersdorf.

Weinbach was diagnosed with cancer in 2007 but continued to teach, lecture and write as he underwent medical treatment. His health deteriorated several months before his death. On December 11, 2012, the same day that a prayer gathering was to be held at Yeshivas Ohr Somayach on his behalf, he died. He was eulogized in the main synagogue in Kiryat Mattersdorf and at Yeshivas Ohr Somayach. He was buried on Har HaMenuchot in Jerusalem.

== Selected bibliography ==
- Who Wants to Live: 101 mesholim of the Chofetz Chaim. Nachat Publications. 1968.
- Give Us Life: Mesholim and masterwords of the Chofetz Chaim, Vol. 1. Feldheim Publishers. 1969. (ed.)
- Turnabout: The Malbim on Megillas Esther. Nachat Publications. 1971. ISBN 9780944070246. Second revised edition pub. 1990 by Targum Press, ISBN 0-944070-24-8
- Give Us Life: Mesholim and masterwords of the Chofetz Chaim, Vol. 2. Feldheim Publishers. 1973.
- On Wings of Prayer: Mesholim and illuminations on the daily prayers by the Chofetz Chaim and other Torah greats. Shma Yisroel Program Publications. 1973. ISBN 0875592236.
- 127 Insights Into Megillas Esther. Targum Press. 1990. ISBN 0-944070-50-7.
- The Magic Elixir: Vol. 1 – Who Wants To Live?. Feldheim Publishers. 1993. ISBN 156871002X.
- The Weekly Daf: Insights and lessons on Daf Yomi selections. Targum Press. 2001. ISBN 9781568712604.
- Love of the Land. Southfield, Michigan: Targum Press. 2006. ISBN 1568713851.
- TalmuDigest. Jewish Learning Library. 2007. ISBN 978-1568714097.
- The Essential Malbim: Flashes of insight on Bereishis/Genesis. Mesorah Publications. Ltd. 2009. ISBN 978-1-4226-0927-9. (ed.)
- The Essential Malbim: Flashes of insight on Shemos/Exodus. Mesorah Publications, Ltd. 2010. ISBN 978-1422610732. (ed.)
