= Schwarzman =

Schwarzman is a surname. Notable people with the surname include:

- Alexander Schwarzman (born 1967), Russian draughts grandmaster
- Howie Schwarzman (1927–2020), American magician
- Marguerite Engler Schwarzman (1892–1985), American librarian, educator, writer, activist
- Stephen A. Schwarzman (born 1947), American private equity businessman, co-founder of Blackstone
- Ted Schwarzman (1946–2023), Australian footballer
- Teddy Schwarzman (born 1979), American film producer

== Fictional ==
- Alice P. Schwarzman, character in the comic strip Doonesbury

== See also ==
- Schwarzmann for other spellings
