= Schwartzmann =

Schwartzmann is a surname, and may refer to:

- Leon Schwartzmann (1887–1942), a Polish–French chess master
- Paulette Schwartzmann, a French–Argentine chess player

== See also ==
- Schwarzmann for other spellings
