= Shvartsman =

Shvartsman is a surname. Notable people with the surname include:

- Alex Shvartsman (born 1975), American Magic: The Gathering player
- Leib Shvartsman, birth name of Lev Shestov (1866–1938), Russian existentialist philosopher
- Leonid Shvartsman (1920–2022), Soviet and Russian animator and artist
- Roman Shvartsman (born 1936), Ukrainian public figure

== See also ==
- Schwarzmann for other spellings
