= Nota Schiller =

American-born Israeli rabbi (1937–2025)

Rabbi Nota Schiller נטע שילר
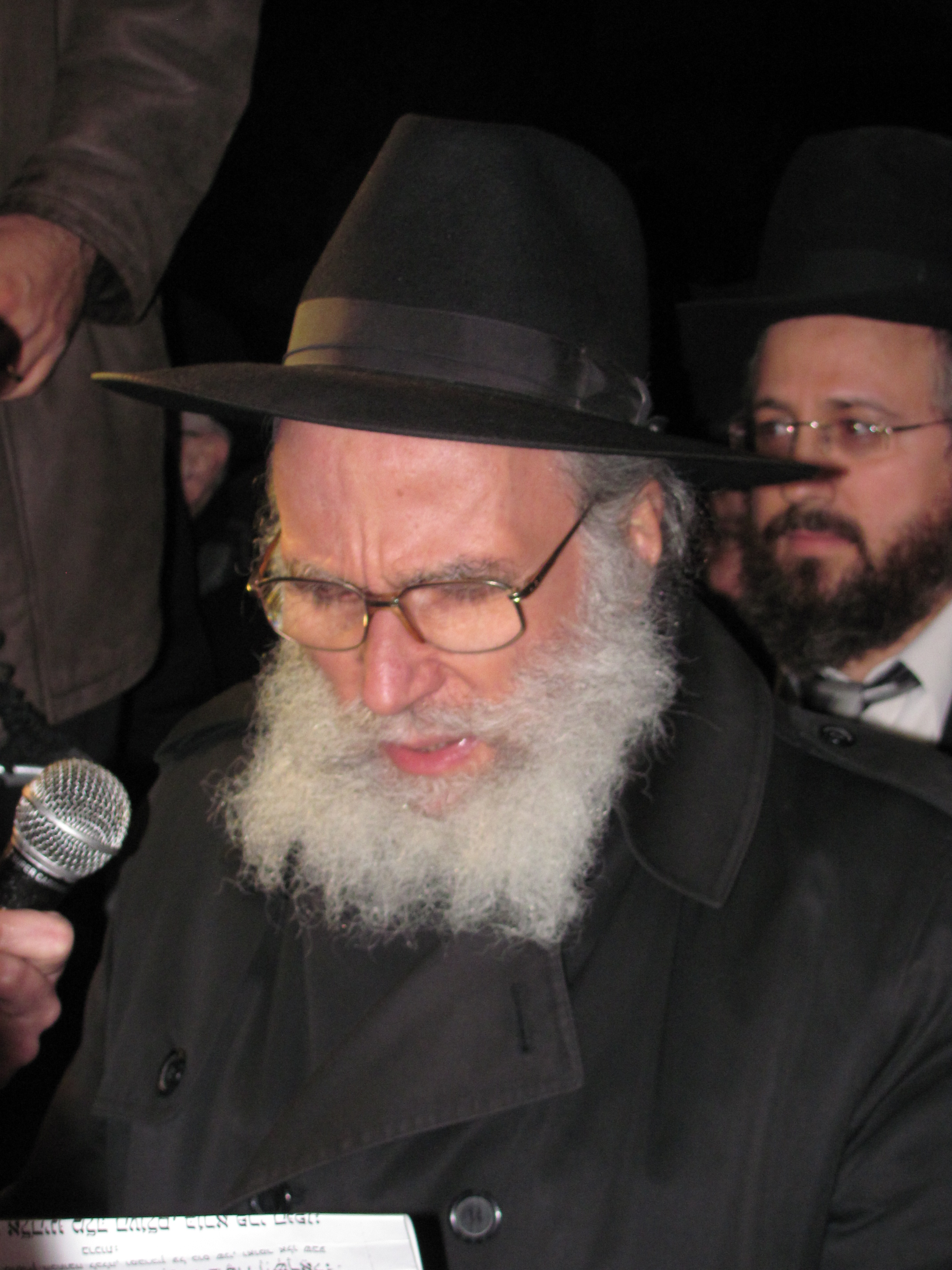
- Schiller in 2011
- Title: Rosh Yeshiva

Personal life
- Born: Nota Schiller; 1937 New York City, U.S.
- Died: March 8, 2025 (aged 88) Jerusalem, Israel
- Buried: Har HaMenuchot
- Spouse: Sima

Religious life
- Religion: Judaism
- Yeshiva: Ohr Somayach, Jerusalem
- Position: Rosh yeshiva
- Began: 1972

Nota Schiller (Hebrew: נטע שילר; 1937 – March 8, 2025) was an American-born Israeli Orthodox Jewish rabbi and rosh yeshiva of Yeshivat Ohr Somayach, Jerusalem who was an influential figure in the baal teshuva movement,

== Biography ==
Schiller was born in 1937 and raised in Brooklyn, New York, where he attended Yeshiva Rabbi Chaim Berlin's high School. He graduated from Yeshivas Ner Yisroel in Baltimore.

In 1972, rabbis Noah Weinberg, Mendel Weinbach, Nota Schiller, and Yaakov Rosenberg founded Shma Yisrael Yeshiva to teach young Jewish men with little or no background in Jewish studies. After a few years, Weinberg left the yeshiva over a difference in philosophy and founded Aish HaTorah in 1974, whereas Rosenberg left and founded Machon Shlomo in Har Nof. Shma Yisrael subsequently changed its name to Ohr Somayach, after the commentary on the Mishneh Torah written by Meir Simcha of Dvinsk, the Ohr Somayach. Schiller on March 8, 2025 at the age of 88.
