= Yaakov Eliezer Schwartzman =

Orthodox Jewish rabbi

Yaakov Eliezer Schwartzman (Hebrew: יעקב אליעזר שוורצמן) is an Orthodox Jewish rabbi and rosh yeshiva of the Lakewood East yeshiva in Ramot, Jerusalem.

He is the son of Rabbi Dov Schwartzman, the eldest grandson of Rabbi Aharon Kotler, the son-in-law of Rabbi Shlomo Wolbe, and the great-grandson of Rabbi Isser Zalman Meltzer. Schwartzman was one of the main forces behind the Haredi ban of Rabbi Nathan Kamenetsky's Making of a Godol (notwithstanding Rabbi Kamenetsky being a cousin of Schwartzman's wife and a former teacher of Schwartzman). His brother, Rabbi Zevulun Schwartzman, was the Rosh Kollel of Etz Chaim Yeshiva.
