= Ohr Somayach, Jerusalem =

Yeshiva based in Jerusalem founded in 1970

Coordinates: 31°47′38.1″N 35°13′32.5″E

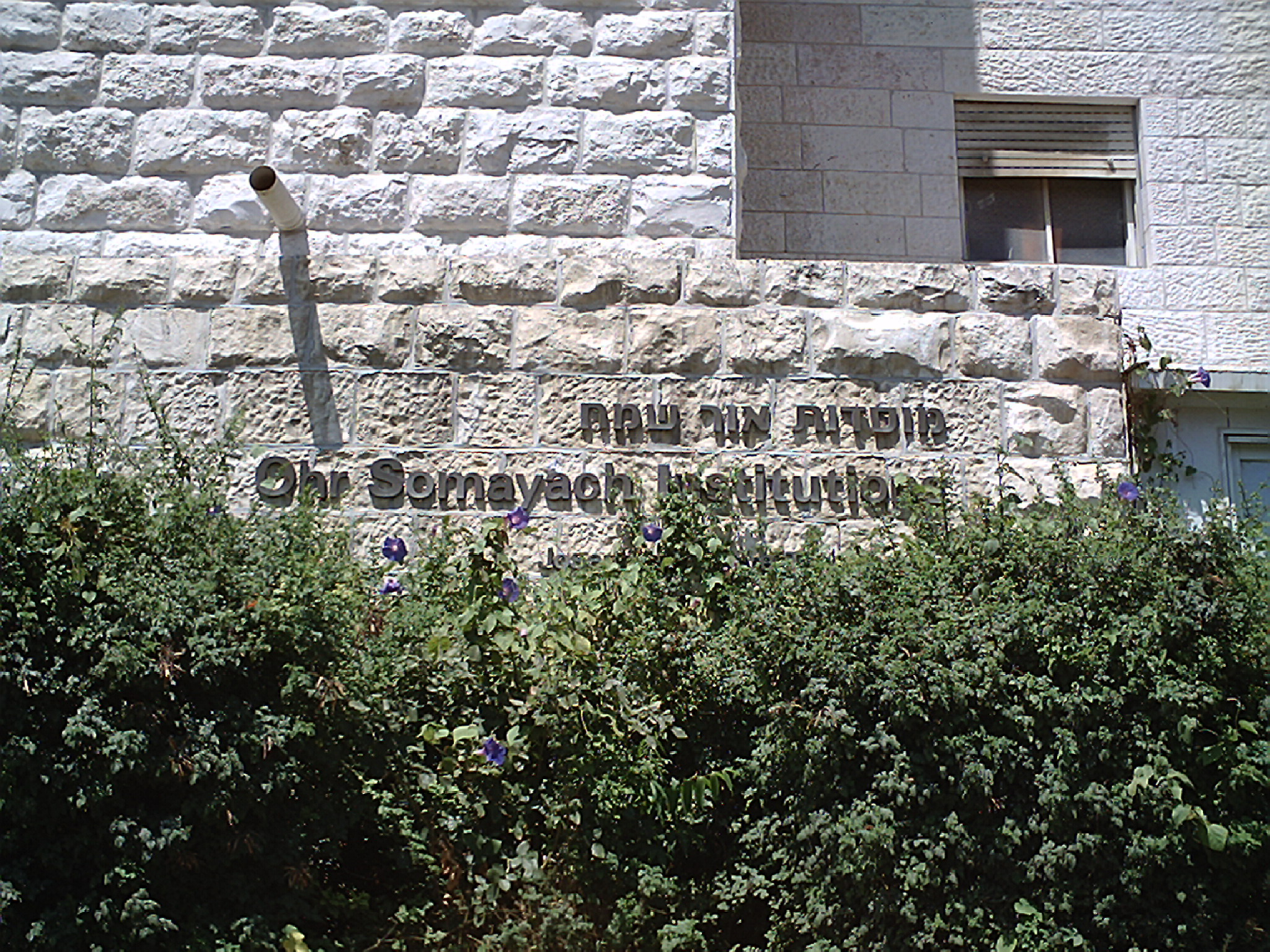
- Ohr Somayach entrance sign
- Jerusalem

Information
- Established: 1972; 54 years ago
- Enrollment: 400
- Rosh Yeshiva: Shlomo Wiener
- Website: ohr.edu

Ohr Somayach (also Or Samayach or Ohr Somayach International) is a yeshiva based in Jerusalem founded in 1970 mostly to educate young Jewish men, usually of college age, who are already interested in learning about Judaism. It is known as a baal teshuva yeshiva since it caters to Jews with little or no background in Judaism, but with an interest in studying the classic texts such as the Talmud and responsa. Students are recruited either locally or from other countries where the yeshiva has established branches, including in the United States, Canada, South Africa, United Kingdom, Australia, Ukraine and Russia.

== History ==
In 1970, Rabbis Noah Weinberg, Mendel Weinbach, Nota Schiller, and Yaakov Rosenberg, founded Shema Yisrael Yeshiva to attract young Jewish men with little or no background in Jewish studies. The founders of the Yeshiva eventually parted ways due to differences in philosophy of teaching with Weinberg founding Aish HaTorah in 1974 and Rosenberg founding Machon Shlomo in 1982.

In 1973, Shema Yisrael changed its name to Ohr Somayach, the title of a commentary on the Mishneh Torah written by Meir Simcha of Dvinsk.

== Notable faculty ==
- Yitzchak Breitowitz, rav of the kehila
- Nota Schiller, former rosh yeshiva
- Mendel Weinbach, former rosh yeshiva
- Aharon Feldman, rosh yeshiva of Ner Yisrael
- Nachman Bulman, mashgiach ruchani
- Dovid Gottlieb, a former professor of analytical philosophy at Johns Hopkins University
- Dovid Kaplan, author of The Kiruv Files and the Impact! series

== Notable alumni ==
- Moses Michael Levi Barrow (born Jamal Michael Barrow; 1978), better known by his stage name Shyne, Belizean rapper and politician
- Natan Gamedze
- Issamar Ginzberg, Graduate of Ohr LaGola: Smicha program
- Jonathan Rosenblum, Haredi author and spokesperson
- Natan Slifkin
- Amar'e Stoudemire, basketball player/coach
- Asher Wade
- Henry Abramson, historian
- Joseph J. Sherman, marketing strategist and artist

== See also ==
- Orthodox Judaism outreach
- Baal teshuva
