= Bais Hatalmud (Jerusalem) =

Coordinates: 31.7981°N 35.2183°E

The yeshiva is located in the Sanhedria Murhevet neighborhood. It also has an alumni association based in Canada.
