= Syanno =

Town in Vitebsk Region, Belarus

Syanno: Сянно (Belarusian); Сенно (Russian)
- Town
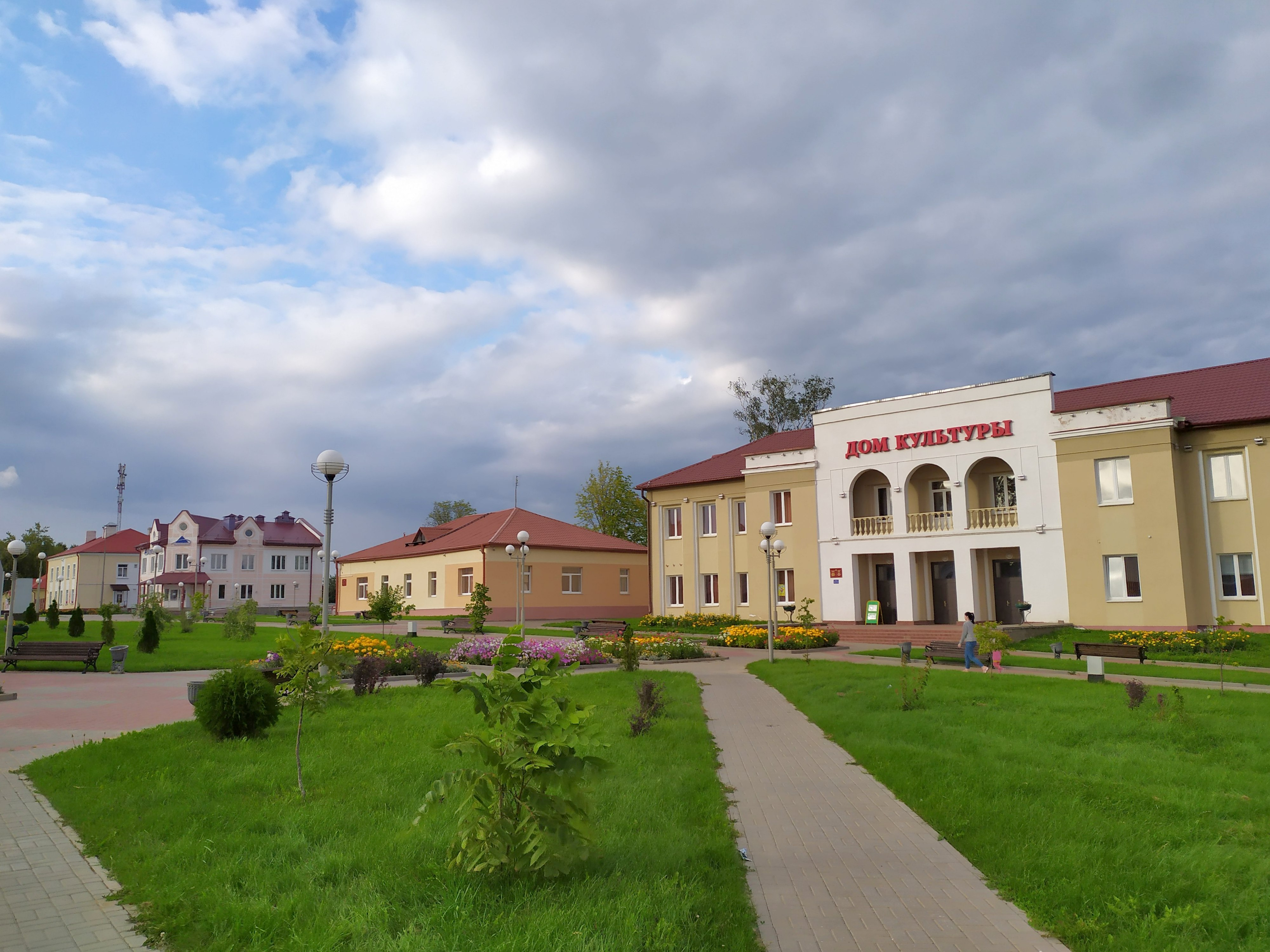

- Flag Coat of arms

- Location within Belarus
- Coordinates: 54°48′N 29°42′E
- Country: Belarus
- Region: Vitebsk Region
- District: Syanno District
- First mentioned: 1442
- Elevation: 176 m (577 ft)

Population (2025)
  - Total: 6,974
- Time zone: UTC+3 (MSK)
- Postal code: 211117
- Area code: +375 2135

Syanno or Senno (Note: Belarusian: Сянно, romanized: Sianno; Russian: Сенно; Polish: Sienno; Lithuanian: Siano.) is a town in Vitebsk Region, Belarus. It serves as the administrative center of Syanno District. It is located 58 km (36 mi) southwest of Vitebsk on the southern shore of Senno Lake. In 2018, its population was 7,092. As of 2025, it has a population of 6,974.

== History ==
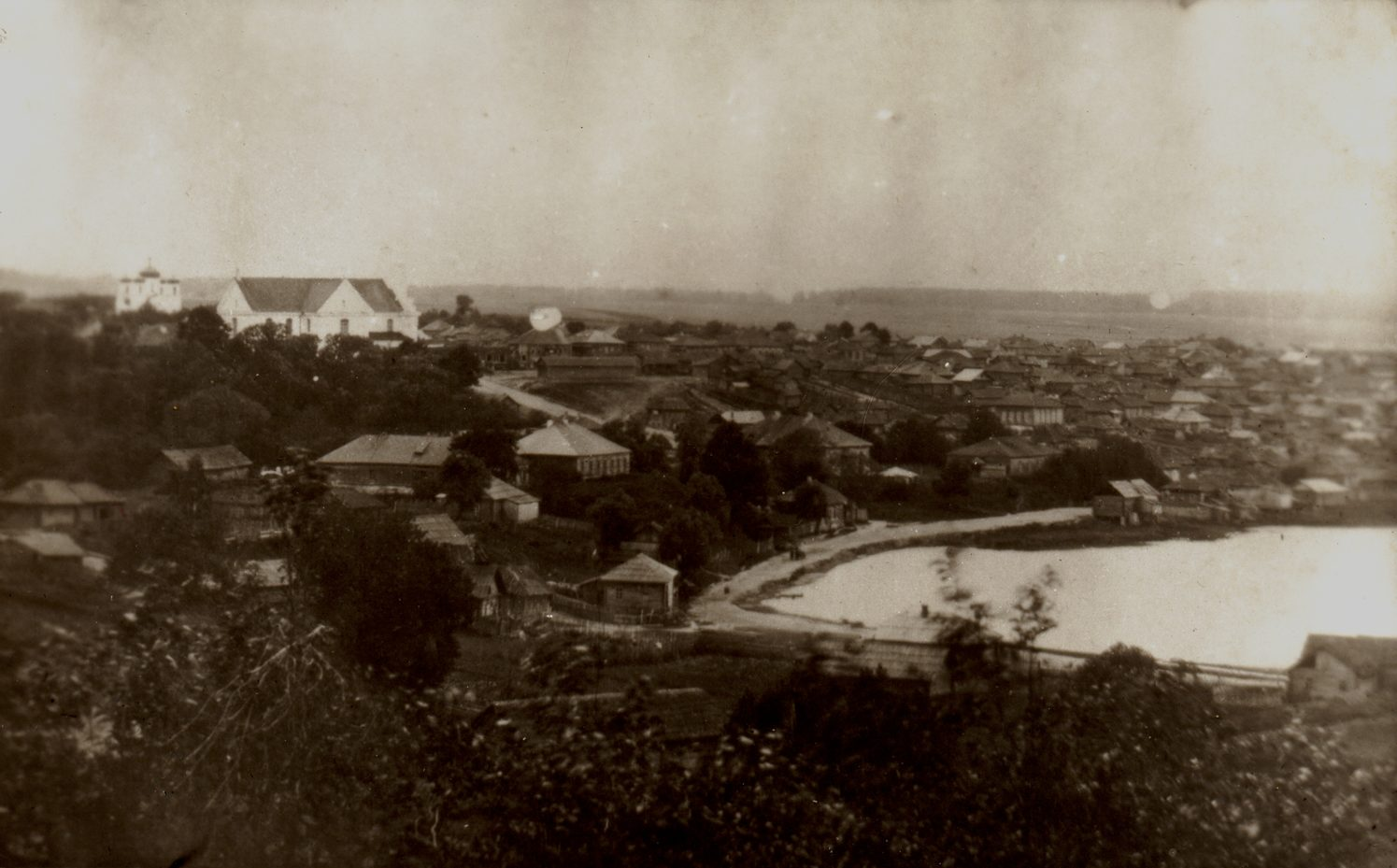
Early-20th-century view

The village is first mentioned in a document of 1442. Fairs were held there, and a lively hay market gave it its name (Belarusian: сена sena 'hay'). The town was repeatedly ravaged during the Muscovite–Lithuanian Wars in the 16th century. It was a private town of nobility, including the Sapieha, Korsak, Ważyński, Lubecki, Tyszkiewicz, Ogiński and Sierakowski families. It was administratively located in the Vitebsk Voivodeship of the Polish–Lithuanian Commonwealth. In 1609, the local landmark Holy Trinity church was founded by Eustachy Kurcz and Regina Kurcz, and then rebuilt in 1772 by the Ogińskis. In 1772, a relic of Saint Venantius Fortunatus, gifted by Pope Clement XIV to Prince Ogiński, was placed in the church.

Following the First Partition of Poland in 1772 it became part of the Russian Empire. In 1781, the current coat of arms was granted.

In 1924, Senno became part of the Byelorussian Soviet Socialist Republic. During World War II, it was the site of a major tank battle in July 1941. A Nazi prison was operated in the town.

== Notable people ==
- Evgeny Radkevich (1937–1999) was a Belarusian writer, teacher, journalist, and member of the USSR Writers' Union. Radkevich published his first short story in the magazine Maladosc in 1961. He taught in the Department of Radio and Television at Belarusian State University.
- Ales Zhavruk (1910–1942) was a Belarusian poet. He published his poems and essays in frontline publications. He authored poetry collections "Streams" and "The Dnieper Overflows Its Banks." In 1939, he co-authored the children's poem "My Comrade" with poet Andrei Ushakov.
- Mikhail Belsky (1921–1988) was a Belarusian artist and graphic artist. He worked in easel and book graphics, using watercolors, etching, lithography, and woodcuts. He illustrated the books "Kali Zlivayutstsa Reki" (The Rivers Are Flying) by P. Brovka, "Poems" and "Verses, Poems" by Yanka Kupala, and "Ukrainian Folk Tales."
- Irina Leshchenko (born 1991) is a Belarusian biathlete and the 2018 Olympic relay champion. She made her international competition debut in 2009 at the World Junior Championships. In the 2017/2018 season, she placed second in the mass start at the Annecy World Cup.
- Dora Kroz (1909 – 1997) is a Belarusian opera singer (lyric-coloratura soprano). Soloist of the State Opera and Ballet Theater of Belarus. Among the best parts: Marfochka (Alesya by E. Tikotsky), Marfa (The Tsar’s Bride by N. Rimsky-Korsakov), Micaela (Carmen by G. Bizet).
