= Syanno district =

District of Vitebsk region, Belarus

Syanno district Сенненскі раён (Belarusian)
- District
- Flag Coat of arms

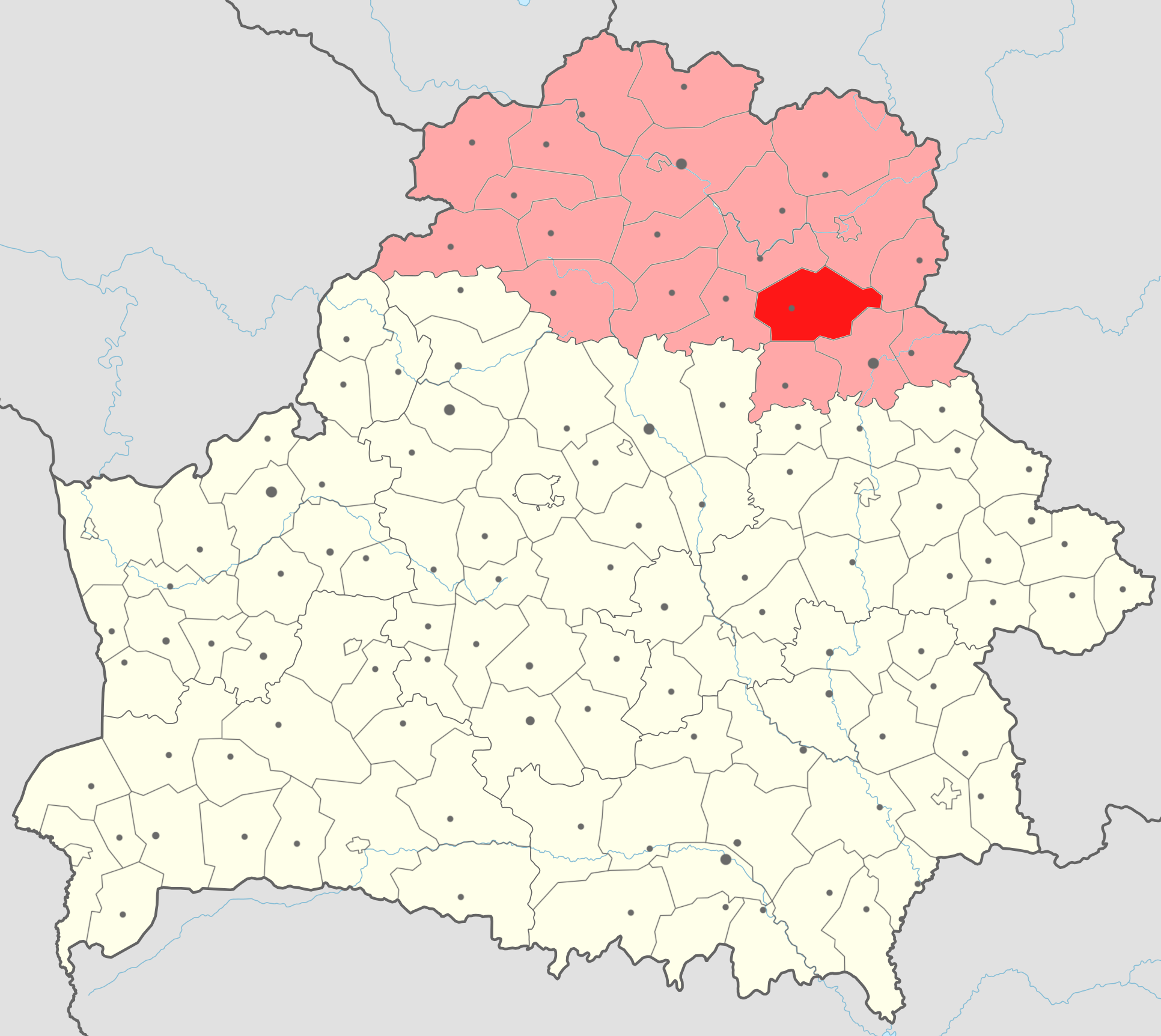
- Coordinates: 54°48′N 29°42′E
- Country: Belarus
- Region: Vitebsk region
- Administrative center: Syanno

Area
  - Total: 1,966.05 km^{2} (759.10 sq mi)
- Elevation: 152 m (499 ft)

Population (2023)
  - Total: 19,035
  - Density: 9.6818/km^{2} (25.076/sq mi)
- Time zone: UTC+3 (MSK)

Syanno district (Belarusian: Сенненскі раён; Russian: Сенненский район) is a district (raion) of Vitebsk region in Belarus. Its administrative center is Syanno.

== Notable residents ==
- Zair Azgur (1908, Maǔčany village – 1995), Belarusian sculptor
- Pyotr Masherov (1919, Šyrki village – 1980), Soviet partisan in World War II and leader of Soviet Belarus between 1965 – 1980
- Lavon Rydleŭski (1903, Uljanavičy village - 1953), active participant in the Belarusian independence movement and an anti-Soviet resistance and a prominent member of the Belarusian diaspora.
