= Nachman Seltzer =

Israeli author (born 1978)

Rabbi Nachman Seltzer
- נחמן סלצר
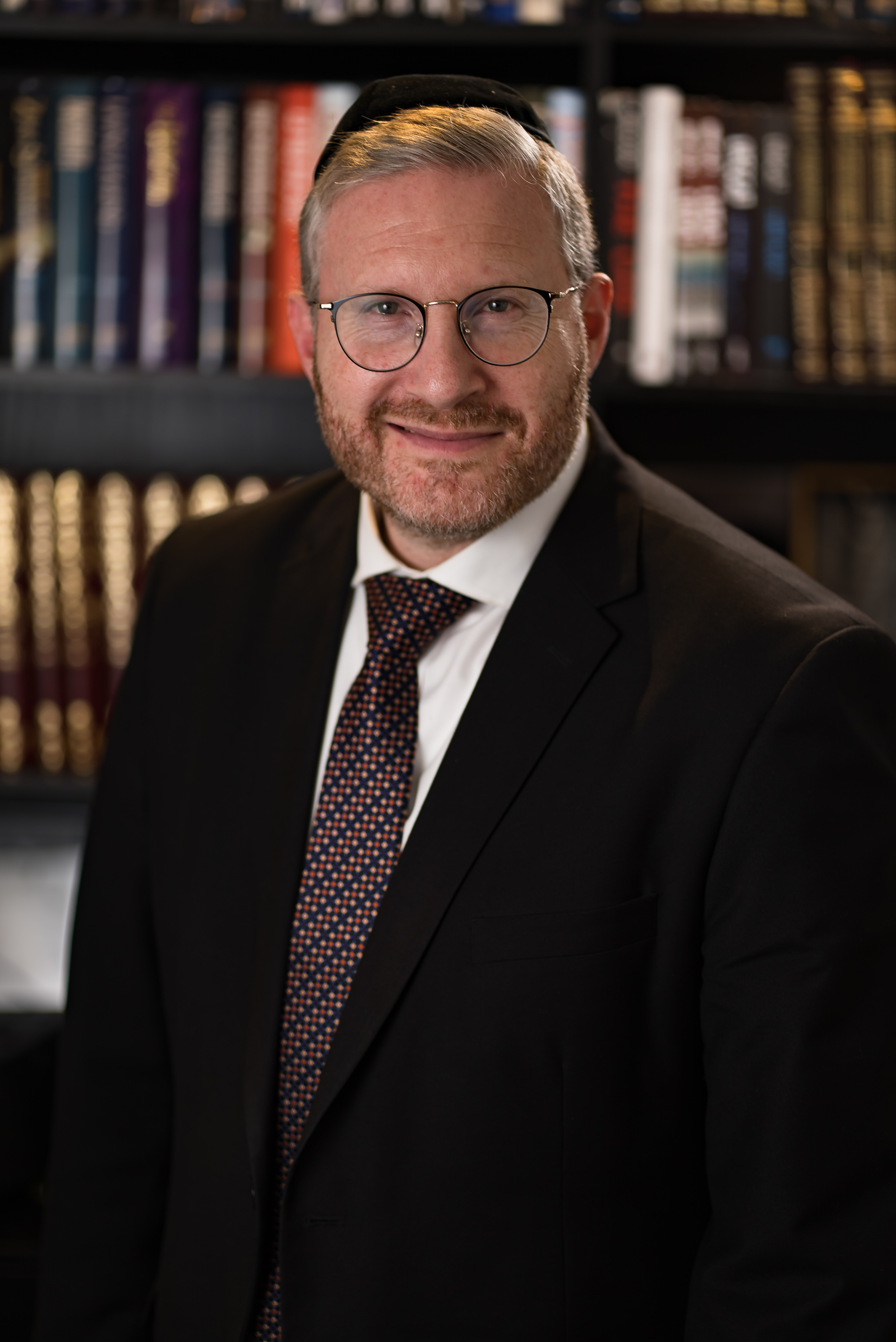
- Seltzer in 2022
- Born: 1978 (age 47–48); Brooklyn, New York, United States
- Education: Beth Medrash Govoha
- Occupations: Author; public speaker; rabbi
- Spouse: Aliza Seltzer
- Children: 4
- Writing career
- Language: English
- Years active: 2004–present
- Period: 2004–present
- Genres: Thriller fiction; Short stories; Biography

Nachman Seltzer (Hebrew: נחמן סלצר; born 1978) is an Israeli author, public speaker, and rabbi. He is known for his work in Jewish literature, particularly focusing on biographies and inspirational stories based on real-life events. He also served as the director of the Shira Chadasha Boys Choir.

== Early life and education ==
Seltzer grew up in a Breslov family in Flatbush and Borough Park in Brooklyn, New York. He attended the Torah Vodaas, Karlin-Stolin, and Yesodei Hatorah yeshivas. He attended various summer camps, where he performed as an actor. As a child, he joined the Miami Boys Choir for two years, between 1992 and 1993.

At age 14, Seltzer immigrated to Israel with his family and later studied at Beth Medrash Govoha in Lakewood Township, New Jersey. After his marriage he studied at the Mir Yeshiva in Jerusalem and received semikhah from Rabbi Yitzchak Berkovits at the Jerusalem Kollel.

== Writing career ==
Seltzer is the author of 55 books as of 2025, which are widely read in Orthodox Jewish communities. His works are known for their narrative style and generally focus on Jewish history, biographies, and inspirational stories, as well as a number of thriller fiction titles. It takes him three to four months to write each book.

He wrote his first book, The Edge, at the age of 23. It was published by Rabbi Moshe Dombey, the founder of Targum Press, who had earlier encouraged him to start writing. His first few books were novels, after which he transitioned to short stories. Currently, he primarily writes biographies.

His books are written in English, and approximately 10 of them have been translated into Hebrew, with some also translated into French, Spanish, and Yiddish. His book The Edge was adapted into a film by Boruch Perlowitz.

He also writes a weekly column in the Mishpacha titled "A Storied People", featuring non-fiction short stories. He formerly contributed weekly to Hamodia.

== Public speaking ==
Seltzer is a frequent lecturer in Jewish communities and on TorahAnytime, often discussing the themes of his books, including faith, positivity, and Jewish identity. He also gives classes on gemara and hashkafa at American yeshivas and seminaries.

== Musical career ==
In 2004, Seltzer founded the Shira Chadasha Boys Choir, a children's choir composed of Israeli boys mainly with American backgrounds. They released five albums: Acheke Lo, Arayvim Zeh Lozeh, The Chanukah Album, Al Hatorah and Am Yisroel. The choir collaborated with artists such as Yaakov Shwekey, Lipa Schmeltzer, and Baruch Levine and accompanied Shwekey in Bloomfield Stadium and Avraham Fried at the Heichal HaTarbut before closing in 2019.

Seltzer also produced Visions, an album of English songs, and co-produced The Story Experience. In September 2021, he released a song titled "A Journey to Radin", which he composed and performed. This song was inspired by his participation in the Dirshu trip to Radun. In February 2023, he released another song titled "It's About The Yomi", also composed and performed by him. This song served as a commercial for Eli Stefansky's daf yomi shiur.

== Reception ==
Seltzer's books and lectures have been well received in Orthodox Jewish circles, garnering significant attention and praise for their unique blend of thriller elements and Jewish cultural themes. Israeli newspaper Ynet has described him as a Haredi version of Harlan Coben, noting that his fiction work has successfully crossed the sector barrier, appealing to both secular and religious readers.

== Personal life ==
Seltzer is married to Aliza Seltzer and has four children. He lives in Ramat Beit Shemesh, Israel, and studies in a local kollel. His son Yehuda Zvi came third place in the final of the children's reality show Magic Kass Star, which was broadcast on Kikar HaShabbat.

Seltzer was also one of the founders of Eli Stefansky's daf yomi shiur.

== Bibliography ==
Year	Title	Publisher	Description
2004	The Edge	Targum Press	Fiction
2006	The Link	Targum Press	Fiction
2006	In the Blink of an Eye	Hamodia Publishing	Short stories
2006	Nine Out of Ten	Israel Book Shop	History
2008	Stories With a Twist	Targum Press	Short stories
2008	The Network	Mesorah Publications	Fiction
2009	Child of War	Mesorah Publications	Biography
2010	It Could Have Been You	Mesorah Publications	Short stories
2010	One Small Deed Can Change The World	Mesorah Publications	Short stories
2010	A Moment in Time	Hamodia Publishing	Short stories
2011	It Could Have Been You Volume 2	Mesorah Publications	Short stories
2011	The Shadows	Mesorah Publications	Fiction
2012	It Could Have Been You Volume 3	Mesorah Publications	Short stories
2012	Meaning of the Moment	Hamodia Publishing	Short stories
2013	Class Acts	Mesorah Publications	Short stories
2013	Heaven's Tears	Mesorah Publications	Biography of Sima Halberstam Preiser
2014	48	Mesorah Publications	Short stories
2014	Inside Their Homes	Mesorah Publications	Biography
2015	I Have An Amazing Story For You	Mesorah Publications	Short stories
2015	Class Acts Volume 2	Mesorah Publications	Short stories
2016	Incredible!	Mesorah Publications	Biography of Rabbi Yossi Wallis
2016	I Have An Amazing Story For You Volume 2	Mesorah Publications	Short stories
2016	Duvid HaMelech	Tfutza Publications	Children's biography of David
2017	At His Rebbi's Side	Mesorah Publications	Biography
2017	Zera Shimshon: The Sefer. The Stories. The Segulah.	Mesorah Publications	Work on Zera Shimshon
2018	Encounters With Greatness	Mesorah Publications	Biography
2018	Zera Shimshon 2: The Sefer. The Stories. The Segulah.	Mesorah Publications	Work on Zera Shimshon
2018	Escape To Shanghai	Menucha Publishers	History
2019	Incredible! 2	Mesorah Publications	Biography
2019	I have An Amazing Story For You Volume 3	Mesorah Publications	Short stories
2020	The Rebbetzin	Mesorah Publications	Biography of Rebbetzin Esther Jungreis
2020	Our Man in Jerusalem	Mesorah Publications	Biography of Rabbi Yisroel Gellis
2020	A Tiny Taste of Heaven	Mesorah Publications	Short stories about hafrashas challah
2021	Living Legend: Rabbi Grossman of Migdal HaEmek	Mesorah Publications	Biography of Rabbi Yitzchak Dovid Grossman
2021	Reb Getzel	Mesorah Publications	Biography of Getzel Berger
2021	The Insider	Mesorah Publications	Biography of Yisroel Katzover
2022	Rav Yitzchok Scheiner	Mesorah Publications	Biography of Rabbi Yitzchok Scheiner
2022	Zera Shimshon Eishes Chayil: The Sefer. The Stories. The Segulah	Mesorah Publications	Work on Zera Shimshon
2022	I Have An Amazing Story For You Volume 4	Mesorah Publications	Short stories
2023	The Maggid of Sydney	Feldheim Publishers	Biography of Tom Rev and the Kamarna Rebbe
2023	From Sinai To Yerushalayim	Mesorah Publications	Biography of Roy and Leah Neuberger
2023	90 Seconds	Mesorah Publications	Biography of Eli Beer
2023	The Ribnitzer	Mesorah Publications	Biography of Rabbi Chaim Zanvil Abramowitz
2024	Truth Meets Fiction	Adir Press	Fiction short stories
2024	Angels in Orange	Mesorah Publications	Stories about United Hatzalah in the October 7 attacks
2024	Zera Shimshon on Tehillim: The Sefer. The Stories. The Segulah	Mesorah Publications	Work on Zera Shimshon
2024	Avraham Avinu	Mesorah Publications	Children's biography of Abraham
2025	The Askan	Adir Press	Biography of Shragi Newhouse
2025	The Haggadah with Stories	Mesorah Publications	Stories on the Haggadah
2025	Miracles, Missiles and Mesiras Nefesh	Mesorah Publications	Stories of the Gaza war
2025	Hacham Baruch	Mesorah Publications	Biography of Hacham Baruch Ben-Haim
2025	Chessed Under Fire	Mesorah Publications	Stories of Shai Graucher during the Gaza war
2026	Zera Shimshon Yomi: The Sefer. The Stories. The Segulah.	Mesorah Publications	Daily study of Zera Shimshon
2026	Rabbi Murray Maslaton	Mesorah Publications	Biography of Rabbi Murray Maslaton
