= Miriam Anzovin =

American internet personality

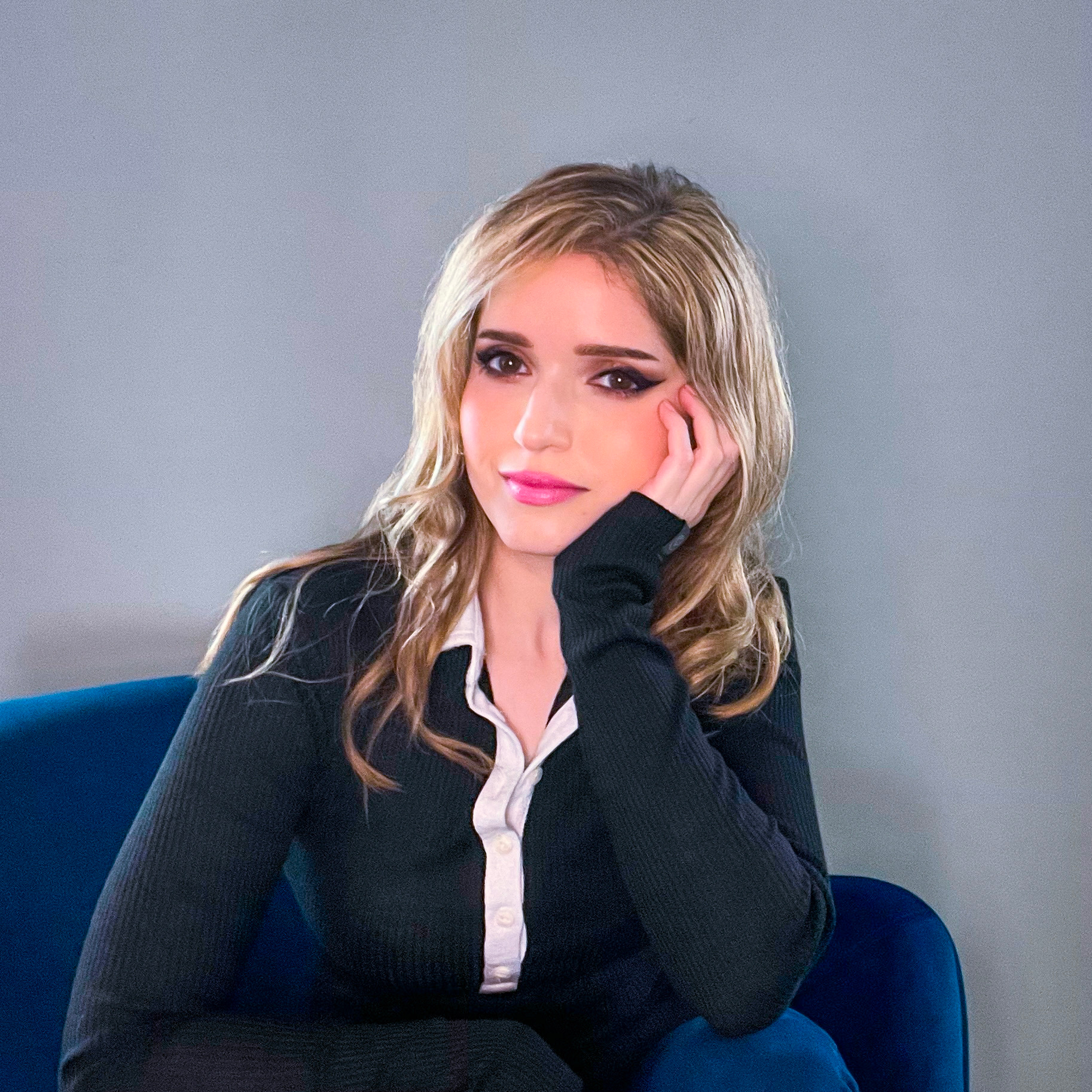
- Born: Englewood, New Jersey
- Occupations: Writer, artist, internet personality
- Known for: Daf Reactions ( social media video series exploring the Talmud)
- Awards: AJPA Award for Outstanding Digital Outreach (2017); The Algemeiner Jewish 100 (2022); Fan Favorite Jewish Pop Culture Icon (2023, Hey Alma); Pomegranate Prize recipient (2026, The Covenant Foundation)

Miriam Anzovin is an American writer, artist, and social media personality. Her work focuses on American Jewish communal life and is best known for her Daf Reactions series of videos explaining passages from the Talmud posted to TikTok and other social media platforms.

== Early life and education ==
Anzovin was born to a Jewish family in Englewood, New Jersey and was raised in Amherst, Massachusetts. The middle of three children, Anzovin and her family became Orthodox and she attended Chabad day school from grades 6 to 8. She has a degree in Judaic Studies from the University of Massachusetts.

== Career ==
Anzovin worked as a visual artist and content producer for JewishBoston.com. In December 2021, Anzovin began posting comedic Daf Reactions videos on the social media platform TikTok concerning her studies in Talmud. The material for the videos were drawn from the Daf Yomi (daily folio) study cycle of the Babylonian Talmud, a study schedule that requires 7.5 years' of daily study. The clips unexpectedly gained popularity and Anzovin's audience appears to not be limited by familiarity with Talmud or even Jewishness. Anzovin describes her personal Talmud study as consisting of learning on Sefaria, an online open source, free content, digital library of Jewish texts, and listening to online classes offered by Rabbanit Michelle Cohen Farber, who has led Daf Yomi classes for women in Israel. Anzovin attributed her motivations for studying to hearing Rabbi Jonathan Sacks speak about Daf Yomi, and as a response to a rise in antisemitism in the United States.

The general Jewish community response to Anzovin's Daf Reactions videos featured praise that the Talmudic text was being made available to those who previously could not access the material and to those modern Jewish audiences who could now find the text of the Talmud relevant. Anzovin's reception among Orthodox Jews was mixed and featured some criticism from those who viewed her efforts as disrespecting the formality typically associated with traditional Talmud study. Nevertheless, other Orthodox Jews praised her work and material. In 2022, Anzovin was announced as the artist in residence at Moishe House. Following her early success with Daf Reactions, Anzovin joined the Jewish Speakers Bureau and has been invited as a guest speaker to various Jewish communities in the United States.

In 2024, Anzovin was part of the second cohort of the Digital Storytellers Lab for her project Jewish Lore Reactions and was announced as one of 4 artists chosen for the 2024–2025 CJP and JArts Community Creative Fellowship cohort.

Also in 2024, Daf Reactions videos were showcased in Sex: Jewish Positions, an exhibition at the Jewish Museum in Amsterdam.

In 2025, Anzovin became a Reboot network member, writing several entries for the Reboot Glossary and blog. In 2026, Anzovin's work was included in the Brandeis Center for Jewish Studies course "America and Its Jews at 250," in a session titled "Jews in American Popular Culture: Marx Brothers to Miriam Anzovin" taught by Dr. Samantha Pickette.

=== Awards and recognition ===
- AJPA Award for Outstanding Digital Outreach (2017) — Anzovin's work at the JewishBoston.com program The Vibe of the Tribe was recognized in 2017 with an Award for Outstanding Digital Outreach from the American Jewish Press Association (AJPA).
- The Algemeiner Jewish 100 (2022) — Anzovin was listed among the top 100 personalities positively influencing Jewish life in 2022 by Algemeiner Journal.
- The 5783 Alma Awards (2023) — Anzovin was named Fan Favorite Jewish Pop Culture Icon by Hey Alma, a feminist Jewish culture site and online community.
- Pomegranate Prize recipient (2026) — Anzovin was recognized as an emerging leader in the field of Jewish education by the Covenant Foundation.

== See also ==
- Ilana Kurshan
- Hadran (organization)
- Dina Brawer
