= Hadran (Talmud) =

Short prayer in Judaism

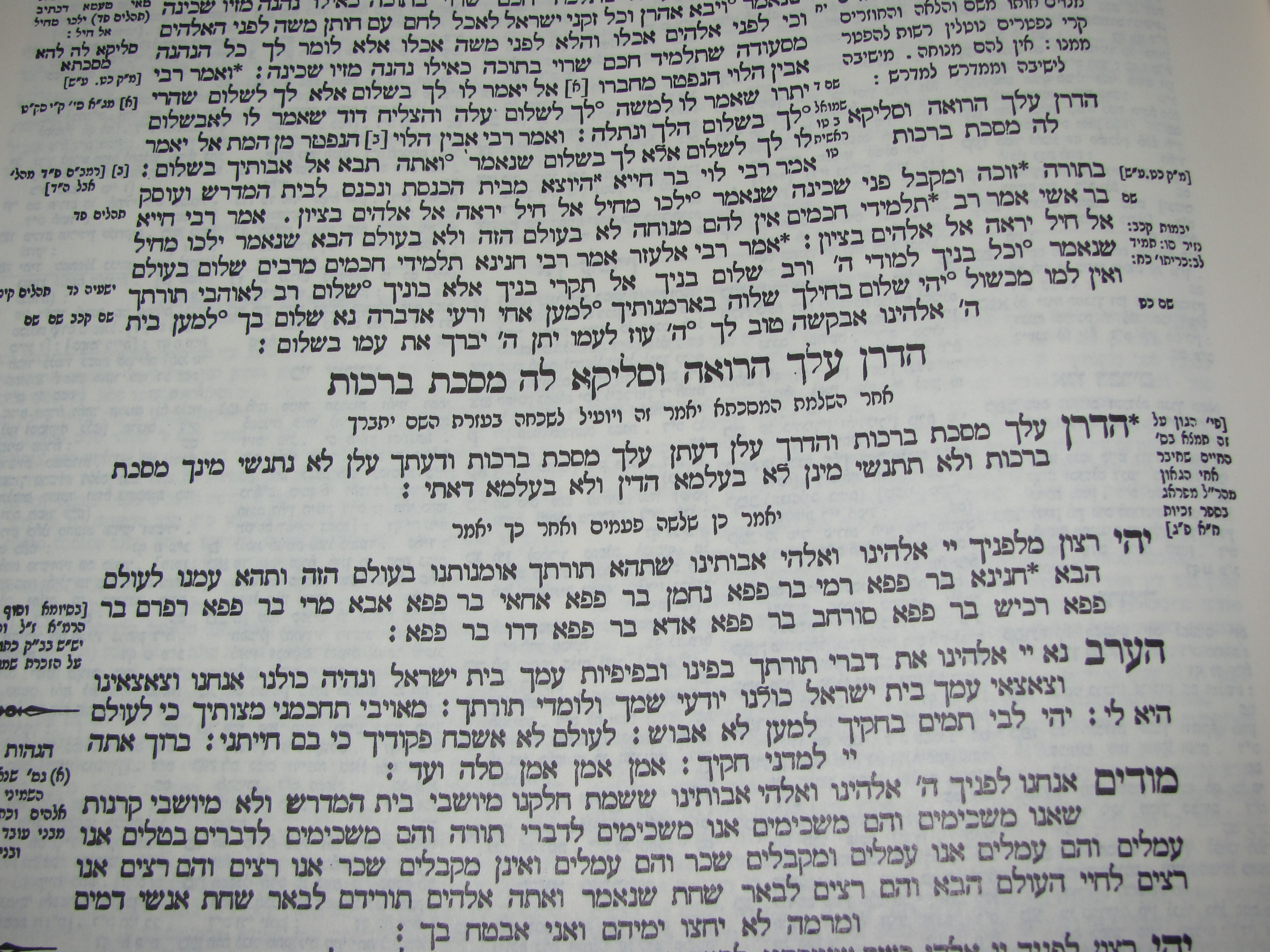
The hadran as it appears at the end of Tractate Berakhot of the Babylonian Talmud (center, beginning second line after large line of print).

Hadran (Imperial Aramaic: הַדְרָן, lit. 'we returned') is a short prayer recited upon the completion of study of a tractate of the Talmud or a Seder of Mishnah. It is also the name of the scholarly discourse delivered at a siyum masechet, the ceremony celebrating the completion of study of a Talmudic tractate.

== Etymology ==
Hadran is an Aramaic word used in the Talmud which literally means "we have returned." It is the first word of a short prayer that appears at the end of each tractate.

== History ==
Versions of the prayer appear in some medieval manuscripts of the Talmud and in the commentary of Chananel ben Chushiel. The first extant secondary description of the prayer, already including the list of Bar Pappas, appears in a teshuva of Hayy Gaon (d. 1038; Groner's list #1092; one MS: Sherira Gaon) quoted by Abraham ben Isaac of Narbonne:

They asked Rav Hayy . . . "Are the 'ten sons of Rav Pappa', which the scholars list whenever they finish a chapter, sons of Rav Pappa, or of another man, or multiple men . . ." And he answered, "They are not all the sons of the great Rav Pappa who was the pupil of Rava, for the son of that Rav Pappa was called 'Abba Mar' (Ketubot 85), and we see that they are the sons of multiple men . . . and they lived at the time of Rav, because some of them repeat the sayings of Hisda . . . there were certainly ten of them, and the scholars know a mnemonic which they say will dispel forgetfulness, such that whenever the scholars finish a chapter, and begin it anew, as is customary, they say, 'Master returned to her, we have returned to you, hanana rama leih nahama le-ahvei aba de-vavei de-apeik le-rikhshei sarhabei ada le-vei daru'. (Note: Literally, "Hanana gave bread to his brother Aba, who hated him and had torn his chariot, but Ada hurried them home." The sentence sounds like a list of the names.) The Rabbis said this in order to remember of the sons of Rav Pappa. 'Master returned to her, we have returned to you, we think of you, you won't forget us and we won't forget you, not in this world or the world to come', three times, 'Let it please the LORD God that the Torah be with us in this world and not forgotten in the world to come'".

Abraham Zacuto (d. 1515) reports similarly, "Some say that the sons of Rav Pappa lived at the time of Rav . . . and I heard from my father that he had heard from the forgetful old Sages that they recited [the list of ten names] seven times as a charm".

== Text ==
The prayer reads:

Aramaic	Transliteration	Translation
הדרן עלך מסכת ____ והדרך עלן דעתן עלך מסכת ___ ודעתך עלן לא נתנשי מינך מסכת _____ ולא תתנשי מינן לא בעלמא הדין ולא בעלמא דאתי	Hadran alakh Masekhet _____ ve-hadrakh alan da'atan alakh Masekhet _____ ve-da'atekh alan lo nitnashi minekh Masekhet _____ ve-lo titnashi minan lo be-alma ha-din ve-lo be-alma deati	We have returned to you, Tractate ____ [name of tractate], and you have returned to us; our mind is on you, Tractate _____, and your mind is on us; we will not forget you, Tractate ______, and you will not forget us – not in this world and not in the world to come.

The geonic teshuva cited above indicates that hadran comes from the Aramaic root h-d-r, which is similar to the Hebrew root h-z-r ('return' or 'review'). In the modern day, when it is no longer customary to immediately repeat the just-completed text, the same text is recited with the implied figurative sense of "We will return to you . . ." According to Rabbi Chaim ben Betzalel, author of Sefer HaChaim, the word hadran is similar to the Hebrew root h-d-r ('glory'), and thus speaks of the Talmud as being 'our glory'. In his words: "Since the Talmud is glorious only when studied by Jews, and Israel itself is distinguished precisely by its adherence to the Oral Torah, which separates it from the nations, we therefore are accustomed to declare at the completion of a tractate that 'our glory is on you, and your glory is on us'". Other observers point out this alternative meaning.

== Recital ==
The hadran is said aloud at a siyum celebrating the completion of study of a Talmudic tractate. The one who has studied the tractate leaves aside a small portion at the end of the text to learn at the siyum. After studying this portion aloud, the person recites the hadran three times. If a group of students is completing a tractate, their principal or teacher learns the last portion of the tractate aloud and they all recite the hadran together three times.

The wording of the hadran is an expression of love and friendship, as if the tractate has become the learner's friend since he has studied it, and he longs to be reunited with it. According to Yoma Tova LeRabbanan, the repetition of the hadran three times is a segulah (propitious remedy) for remembering what one has learned.

The learner or learners also recite a short passage describing Rav Papa and his ten sons, which is also considered a protection against forgetting one's learning.

== Discourse ==
It is customary for a scholar to deliver a Talmudic discourse at a siyum being made on the completion of a tractate. This discourse is also called a hadran. The speaker may be the one completing the tractate or another honored guest. This discourse connects the end of the tractate with its beginning, or with the beginning of the next tractate in sequence, using pilpul (incisive analysis) to connect the ideas in the two places.

A special literature of hadran pilpul began appearing at the beginning of the 18th century. Since then, numerous collections of hadran discourses have been published. Many leading rabbis who opposed pilpul criticized its use in the hadran.

At the 5th Siyum HaShas of Daf Yomi in Tel Aviv in 1960, Rabbi Yosef Shlomo Kahaneman, the Ponovezher Rav, delivered a hadran for nearly two hours. At the age of 17, Rabbi Yitzchak Yaacov Reines delivered a hadran that lasted three days at a Siyum HaShas celebrated by the Chevras Shas (Shas Society) of his hometown.
