= Michelle Cohen Farber =

Michelle Cohen Farber (Hebrew: מישל כהן פרבר; b. 1971 or 1972 (age 53–54)) is the first Jewish woman to publicly lead a Daf Yomi study, a multi-year Jewish study cycle of the Talmud traditionally reserved for men. The women's Daf Yomi led by Farber celebrated its first Siyum HaShas (i.e., completion of a Daf Yomi cycle) at the International Convention Center (Binyanei Ha'Uma) in Jerusalem on January 5, 2020. Her study group meets at her home in Ra'anana, Israel; the classes are recorded and circulated on platforms including YouTube and Spotify.

Farber, an Orthodox Jew, is originally from Lawrence, Nassau County, New York, and emigrated to Israel c. 1995. She started formal Talmud study at age 14 at the Yeshivah of Flatbush. She attended college at Barnard College in New York and Bar-Ilan University in Israel, where she received a bachelor's degree in Talmud and Bible studies.

Farber co-founded Hadran, an organization to promote Talmud study among women.

She is married to Seth Farber, a rabbi who is founder and director of the Jewish community advocacy organization, ITIM.

== See also ==
- Ilana Kurshan
- Miriam Anzovin
