= Ilana Kurshan =

American-Israeli author

- אילנה קורשן
- Education: Harvard University (BA, History of Science, 2000); Cambridge University (M.Phil, English literature, 2002)
- Occupations: Writer, translator, editor
- Spouse: Daniel Feldman
- Children: 5
- Awards: 2018 Sami Rohr Prize for Jewish Literature
- Website: https://ilanakurshan.com

Ilana Kurshan (Hebrew: אילנה קורשן) is an American-Israeli author, translator, and editor based in Jerusalem. She is author of the memoirs If All the Seas Were Ink (2017) and Children of the Book: A Memoir of Reading Together (2025). Kurshan's work explores themes of faith, family, and the power of Jewish texts in contemporary life.

== Personal life ==
Kurshan was raised on Long Island, New York, as the daughter of a conservative rabbi and an executive at United Jewish Appeal-Federation of New York. She graduated from Huntington High School, Harvard College, and Cambridge University, where she studied the History of Science and English Literature. She worked as an editor and literary agent in New York before moving to Jerusalem with her first husband for his rabbinic studies. Although her first marriage ended, Kurshan remained in Jerusalem, working as a translator and foreign-rights agent. She lives in Jerusalem with her husband, Daniel Feldman, and their five children.

In her memoir If All the Seas Were Ink, she describes how she found a lifeline in the Daf Yomi, the daily study of the Babylonian Talmud, applying its richness to her life as a single woman, and then as a remarried wife and mother. She also teaches and studies Torah in Jerusalem.

== Professional career ==
Kurshan has translated books by Ruth Calderon and Binyamin Lau from Hebrew to English. She is the book review editor for Lilith magazine, and her writings have appeared in Lilith, The Forward, The World Jewish Digest, Hadassah, Nashim, Zeek, Kveller, and Tablet.

== Awards and recognition ==
In 2018, her memoir If All the Seas Were Ink won the Sami Rohr Prize for Jewish Literature.

== Selected works ==
- Why Is This Night Different from All Other Nights?: The Four Questions Around the World. Knopf Doublday. 2008. ISBN 9780307493163.; translation of the Passover Seder's Four Questions (Ma Nishtana) into 23 languages. (Also published in alternate editions and imprints.)
- If All the Seas Were Ink. St. Martin's Press. October 10, 2017. ISBN 978-1250121264.
- Children of the Book: A Memoir of Reading Together. St. Martin's Press. August 26, 2025. ISBN 9781250288271.
- Translation: A Snake, A Flood, A Hidden Baby (originally in Hebrew by Meir Shalev), Kalaniot Books, 2021.
- Translation: Yes, We'll Do It (originally published in Hebrew by Dafna Strum), Kalaniot Books, 2025.

== See also ==
- Hadran (organization), Jewish women's Talmud study organization based in Jerusalem
- Michelle Cohen Farber, the first Jewish woman to publicly lead a Daf Yomi, the more than seven-year study of the Talmud
- Miriam Anzovin, American writer who explains the Talmud on social media
