= List of Jewish film directors =

This is a list of Jewish film directors. The countries listed are those where films were directed.

== A ==
- Jim Abrahams (born 1944), US
- J. J. Abrams (born 1966), US
- Ivan Abramson (born 1869), US
- Lenny Abrahamson (born 1966), Ireland, UK
- Michael Addis, US
- Alexandre Aja (born 1978), France
- Chantal Akerman (born 1950), Belgium
- Corey Allen (1934–2010), US
- Woody Allen (born 1935), US
- Mathieu Amalric (born 1965), France
- Broncho Billy Anderson (1880–1971), US
- Eleanor Antin (born 1935), US
- Judd Apatow (born 1968), US
- Alexandre Arcady (born 1947), France
- Alan Arkin (1934–2023), US
- Darren Aronofsky (born 1969), US
- David Arquette (born 1971), US
- Kevin Asch (born 1975), US
- Olivier Assayas (born 1955), France
- Ari Aster (born 1987/1988), US, Sweden
- Yvan Attal (born 1965), France
- Paul Auster (born 1947), US
- Jon Avnet (born 1949), US
- George Axelrod (1922–2003), US

== B ==
- Héctor Babenco (born 1946), Brazil, US
- Ralph Bakshi (born 1938), US
- Bob Balaban (born 1945), US
- Uri Barbash, Israel
- Amir Bar-Lev (born 1972), US
- Boris Barnet (born 1902), USSR
- Daniel Barnz (born 1970), US
- Noah Baumbach (born 1969), US
- Michael Bay (born 1965), US
- Henry Bean (born 1945), US
- Jack Bender (born 1949), US
- László Benedek (born 1905), US, Germany, France
- Richard Benjamin (born 1938), US
- Jean Benoît-Lévy (born 1888), France
- Robby Benson (born 1956), US
- Andrew Bergman (born 1945), US
- Alan Berliner (born 1956), US
- Andrea Berloff (born 1974), US
- Raymond Bernard (born 1891), France
- Curtis Bernhardt (born 1899), Germany, France, UK, US
- Assaf Bernstein (born 1970), Israel
- Claude Berri (born 1934), France
- John Berry (born 1917), US, France
- Herbert Biberman (born 1900), US
- Susanne Bier (born 1960), Denmark, Sweden, UK, US
- Mike Binder (born 1958), US
- Peter Bogdanovich (born 1939), US
- Michel Boujenah (born 1952), France
- Zach Braff (born 1975), US
- John Brahm (born 1893), UK, US, Italy, Germany
- Martin Brest (born 1951), US
- Marshall Brickman (born 1939), US
- Albert Brooks (born 1947), US
- James L. Brooks (born 1940), US
- Mel Brooks (born 1926), US
- Richard Brooks (born 1912), US
- Daniel Burman (born 1973), Argentina

== C ==
- Dyan Cannon (born 1937), US
- William Castle (born 1914), US
- Gilbert Cates (1934), US
- Joseph Cedar (born 1968), Israel
- Alain Chabat (born 1958), France
- Lionel Chetwynd (born 1940), US
- Lisa Cholodenko (born 1964), US
- Joyce Chopra (born 1936), US
- Grigory Chukhray (born 1921), USSR
- Elie Chouraqui (born 1953), France
- Shirley Clarke (born 1919), US
- Larry Cohen (born 1941), US
- Joel Coen (born 1954) and Ethan Coen (born 1957), US
- Rob Cohen (born 1949), US
- Hubert Cornfield (born 1929), Turkey
- Brandon Cronenberg (born 1980), Canada
- David Cronenberg (born 1943), Canada
- George Cukor (born 1899), US
- Michael Curtiz (born 1886), US, Hungary
- Paul Czinner (born 1890), Austria, Germany, UK

== D ==
- Jules Dassin (1911–2008), US, France
- Maya Deren (1917–1961), US
- Cecil B. DeMille (1881–1959), US
- Howard Deutch (1950–), US
- Stanley Donen (1924–2019), US
- Mark Donskoy (1901–1981), USSR
- Richard Donner (1930–2021), US
- Robert Downey, Sr. (1935–2021), US
- Michel Drach (born 1930), France
- Lena Dunham (born 1986), US

== E ==
- Judit Elek (born 1937), Hungary
- Gad Elmaleh (born 1971), France
- Morris Engel (born 1918), US
- Nora Ephron (born 1941), US
- Jean Epstein (born 1897), France
- Marie Epstein (born 1899), France
- Fridrikh Ermler (born 1898), USSR

== F ==
- Jon Favreau (born 1966), US
- Dave Fleischer (born 1894), US
- Max Fleischer (born 1883), US
- Richard Fleischer (born 1916), US
- Ruben Fleischer (born 1974), US
- Ari Folman (born 1962), Israel
- Aleksander Ford (born 1908), Poland
- Péter Forgács (born 1950), Hungary
- James Franco (born 1978), US
- Robert Frank (born 1924), US
- Friz Freleng (born 1906), US
- Sami Frey (born 1937), France
- William Friedkin (born 1935), US
- Samuel Fuller (born 1911), US

== G ==
- Béla Gaál (born 1893), Hungary
- Liz Garbus (born 1970), US
- Jack Garfein (born 1930), US
- Gyula Gazdag (born 1947), Hungary, US
- Aleksei Yuryevich German (born 1938), USSR, Russia
- Kurt Gerron (born 1897), Germany
- Viktor Gertler (born 1901), Hungary
- Amos Gitai (born 1950), Israel
- Jonathan Glazer (born 1965), UK
- Jack Gold (born 1930), UK
- Evan Goldberg (born 1982), US
- Marina Goldovskaya (born 1941), USSR, US, Russia
- Akiva Goldsman (born 1962), US
- Keith Gordon (born 1961), US
- Michael Gordon (born 1909), US
- Debra Granik (born 1963), US
- James Gray (born 1969), US
- Joseph Green (born 1900), US
- Bud Greenspan (born 1926), US
- Maggie Greenwald (born 1955), US
- Robert Greenwald (born 1943), US
- Christopher Guest (born 1948), US
- Charles Guggenheim (born 1924), US
- Davis Guggenheim (born 1963), US

== H ==
- Hugo Haas (born 1901), Czechoslovakia
- Roger Hanin (born 1925), France
- Todd Haynes (born 1961), US
- Michel Hazanavicius (born 1967), France
- Amy Heckerling (born 1954), US
- Buck Henry (born 1930), US
- János Herskó (born 1926), Hungary
- Marshall Herskovitz (born 1952), US
- Aleksander Hertz (born 1879), Poland
- Juraj Herz (born 1934), Czechoslovakia
- John Herzfeld, US
- Grant Heslov (born 1963), US
- Arthur Hiller (born 1923), US
- Jerzy Hoffman (born 1932), Poland
- Agnieszka Holland (born 1948), Poland, West Germany, France, UK, US
- Nicole Holofcener (born 1960), US
- Peter Hyams (born 1943), US

== J ==
- Lee Jaffe (born 1950), US
- Stanley R. Jaffe (born 1940), US
- Henry Jaglom (born 1938), US
- Agnès Jaoui (born 1964), France
- Andrew Jarecki (born 1960), US
- Eugene Jarecki (born 1964), US
- Alejandro Jodorowsky (born 1929), France, Mexico, US, UK, Chile
- Ján Kadár (born 1918), Slovakia, Czech Republic, US, Canada, Ramakrishna U, India

== K ==
- Jeremy Paul Kagan (born 1945), US
- Garson Kanin (born 1912), US
- Jake Kasdan (born 1975), US
- Lawrence Kasdan (born 1949), US
- Nicole Kassell (born 1972), US
- Peter Kassovitz (born 1938), France, Hungary
- Charlie Kaufman (born 1958), US
- George S. Kaufman (born 1889), US
- Lloyd Kaufman (born 1945), US
- Moises Kaufman (born 1963), US
- Tony Kaye (director) (born 1952), US
- Aviva Kempner (born 1946), US
- Irvin Kershner (born 1923), US
- Iosif Kheifits (born 1905), USSR
- Beeban Kidron (born 1961), UK, US
- Simon Kinberg (born 1973), US
- Zalman King (born 1942), US
- Dimitri Kirsanoff (1899–1957), Estonia, France
- Cédric Klapisch (born 1961), France
- William Klein (born 1928), France
- Jan Jakub Kolski (born 1956), Poland
- Alexander Korda (born 1893), UK, Hungary
- Zoltan Korda (born 1895), UK, Hungary
- Harmony Korine (born 1973), US
- Henry Koster (born 1905), US
- Grigori Kozintsev (born 1905), USSR
- Stanley Kramer (born 1913), US
- Stanley Kubrick (born 1925), US, UK
- Alex Kurtzman (born 1973), US

== L ==
- John Landis (born 1950), US
- Fritz Lang (born 1890), on his mother's side
- Claude Lanzmann (1925 – 2018), France
- Marc Lawrence (1910 – 2005), US
- Mélanie Laurent (born 1983), France
- Mimi Leder (born 1952), US
- Mike Leigh (born 1943), UK
- Paul Lieberstein (born 1967), US
- Claude Lelouch (born 1937), France
- Paul Leni (born 1885), Germany, US
- Mervyn LeRoy (born 1900), US
- Jonathan Levine (born 1976), US
- Barry Levinson (born 1942), US
- Dani Levy (born 1957), Switzerland
- Eugene Levy (born 1946) USA
- Shawn Levy (born 1967), US
- Albert Lewin (born 1894), US
- Ben Lewin (born 1946), Australia, UK, France, US
- Jerry Lewis (born 1925), US
- Joseph H. Lewis (born 1907), US
- Sébastien Lifshitz (born 1968), France
- Peter Lilienthal (born 1929), Germany
- Doug Liman (born 1965), US
- Jeff Lipsky, US
- Lynne Littman (born 1941), US
- Anatole Litvak (born 1902), Germany, France, US
- Mike Yechiel Lichtman (born 1981) USA
- Jennie Livingston (born 1962), US
- Arthur Lubin (born 1898), US
- Ernst Lubitsch (born 1894), US, Germany
- Michael Lucas (born 1972), US
- Sidney Lumet (born 1924), US
- Rod Lurie (born 1962), US
- Henry Lynn (born 1895), US

== M ==
- Norman Mailer (born 1923) USA
- Clara Mamet (born 1994), US
- David Mamet (born 1947), US
- James Mangold (born 1963), US
- Joseph L. Mankiewicz (born 1909), US
- Daniel Mann (born 1912), US
- Michael Mann (born 1943), US
- Andrew Marton (born 1904), Austria, Germany, US, UK, Hungary
- Rudolph Maté (born 1898), US
- Melina Matsoukas (born 1981), US
- Elaine May (born 1932), US
- Paul Mazursky (born 1930), US
- Jean-Pierre Melville (born 1917), France
- Sam Mendes (born 1965), US, UK
- Nicholas Meyer (born 1945), US
- Nancy Meyers (born 1949), US
- Radu Mihăileanu (born 1958), France, Romania
- Lewis Milestone (born 1895), US
- Bennett Miller (born 1966), US
- Claude Miller (born 1942), France
- Michel Mitrani (born 1930), France
- Moshé Mizrahi (born 1931), Israel, France
- Serge Moati (born 1958), France, Tunisia
- Meredith Monk (born 1942), US
- Janusz Morgenstern (born 1922), Poland
- Errol Morris (born 1948), US
- Oren Moverman (born 1966), US
- Andrzej Munk (born 1921), Poland

== N ==
- Tim Blake Nelson (born 1964), US
- Sam Newfield (born 1899), US
- Avi Nesher (born 1952), Israel
- Mike Nichols (born 1931), US
- Leonard Nimoy (born 1931), US
- Yuriy Norshteyn (born 1941), USSR, Russia

== O ==
- Ken Olin (born 1954), US
- Marcel Ophuls (born 1927), France, West Germany, US
- Max Ophüls (born 1902) Germany, France, US
- Gérard Oury (born 1919), France
- Frank Oz (born 1944), US

== P ==
- Alan J. Pakula (born 1928), US
- Stacie Passon (born 1969), US
- Joe Pasternak (born 1901), US
- Larry Peerce (born 1930), US
- Arthur Penn (born 1922), US
- Leo Penn (born 1921), US
- Vadim Perelman (born 1963), US
- Boruch Perlowitz, US
- Alex Ross Perry (born 1984), US
- Irving Pichel (born 1891), US, Germany
- Lupu Pick (born 1886), Germany
- Roman Polanski (born 1933), France, Poland, US
- Stephen Poliakoff (born 1952), UK
- Sydney Pollack (born 1934), US
- Abraham Polonsky (born 1910), US
- Gabe Polsky (born 1979), US
- Gillo Pontecorvo (born 1919), Italy
- Natalie Portman (born 1981), US
- Ted Post (born 1918), US
- Otto Preminger (born 1906), US
- Emeric Pressburger (born 1902), UK

== R ==
- Alfred Radok (born 1917), Czechoslovakia
- Bob Rafelson (born 1933), US
- Sam Raimi (born 1959), US
- Yuli Raizman (born 1903), USSR
- Harold Ramis (born 1944), US
- Irving Rapper (born 1888), US
- Brett Ratner (born 1969), US
- Gregory Ratoff (born 1893), US
- Pierre Rehov, France
- Carl Reiner (born 1922), US
- Rob Reiner (born 1947), US
- Ivan Reitman (born 1946), Canada, US
- Jason Reitman (born 1977), US
- Boots Riley (born 1971), US
- Martin Ritt (born 1914), US
- Lilly Rivlin (born 1936), Israel, US
- Jay Roach (born 1957), US
- Brian Robbins (born 1963), US
- Lauren Miller Rogen (born 1982), US
- Seth Rogen (born 1982), US
- Mikhail Romm (born 1901), USSR
- Abram Room (born 1894), USSR
- Stuart Rosenberg (born 1927), US
- Robert Rossen (born 1908), US
- Eli Roth (born 1972), US
- Stephanie Rothman (born 1936), US
- Jan Rybkowski (born 1912), Poland

== S ==
- Fred Savage (born 1976), US
- Akiva Schaffer (born 1977), US
- Jerry Schatzberg (born 1927), US
- Suzanne Schiffman (born 1929), France
- John Schlesinger (born 1926), UK, US
- Julian Schnabel (born 1951), US
- David Schwimmer (born 1966), US
- Susan Seidelman (born 1952), US
- Steve Sekely (born 1899), Germany, Hungary, US, UK, Italy
- Joann Sfar (born 1971), France
- Vincent Sherman (born 1906), US
- Cate Shortland (born 1968), Australia
- Esfir Shub (born 1894), USSR
- Don Siegel (born 1912), US
- Joan Micklin Silver (born 1935), US
- Bryan Singer (born 1965), US
- Curt Siodmak (born 1902), US, Germany
- Robert Siodmak (born 1900), US, Germany
- Todd Solondz (born 1959), US
- Barry Sonnenfeld (born 1953), US
- Aaron Sorkin (born 1961), US
- Steven Spielberg (born 1946), US
- Nicole Stéphane (born 1923), France
- Ben Stiller (born 1965), US
- Todd Strauss-Schulson (born 1980), US
- Barbra Streisand (born 1942), US
- Steve Suissa (born 1970), France
- István Szabó (born 1938), Hungary, Germany
- Henryk Szaro (born 1900), Poland
- Samy Szlingerbaum (born 1950), Belgium

== T ==
- Danièle Thompson (born 1942), France
- Konrad Tom (born 1887), Poland
- Leonid Trauberg (born 1902), USSR
- Slava Tsukerman (born 1940), Russia
- Jon Turteltaub (born 1963), US

== U ==
- Alexei Uchitel (born 1951), Russia

== V ==
- Francis Veber (born 1937), France
- Dziga Vertov (born 1896), USSR
- Charles Vidor (born 1900), US
- Jordan Vogt-Roberts (born 1984), US
- Josef von Sternberg (born 1894), US, Austria
- Erich von Stroheim (born 1885), US, France, Austria

== W ==
- David Wain (born 1969), US
- Taika Waititi (born 1975), New Zealand, US
- Sam Wanamaker (born 1919), US, UK
- Robin Washington (born 1956), US
- Michał Waszyński (born 1904), Poland, Italy
- Claudia Weill (born 1947), US
- Matthew Weiner (born 1965), US
- Leilah Weinraub (born 1979), US
- Jiří Weiss (born 1913), Czechoslovakia, West Germany, Czech Republic
- Billy Wilder (born 1906), US, France
- Irwin Winkler (born 1931), US
- Frederick Wiseman (born 1930), US, France
- William Wyler (born 1902), US

== Y ==
- Boaz Yakin (born 1966), US
- Linda Yellen (born 1949), US
- Sergei Yutkevich (born 1904), USSR
- Yolande Zauberman, France

== Z ==
- Fred Zinnemann (born 1907), US, Germany
- David Zucker & Jerry Zucker (born 1950), US
- Edward Zwick (born 1952), US
