= Zera Shimshon =

Jewish text, sometimes studied as Segula

Zera Shimshon (Hebrew: זרע שמשון) is a Jewish text written by Rabbi Shimshon Chaim Nachmani, an Italian kabbalist who lived during the 18th century (died 1779). As is common for Jewish texts, the name of the work is also used to identify the author. The work, whose title translates to "The Seed of Shimshon," is composed of approximately 774 essays organized into 59 chapters, covering the 54 parashot (weekly Torah portions) of the Pentateuch as well as the Five Megillot ( Song of Songs, Book of Ruth, Lamentations, Book of Esther, and Ecclesiastes.).

Rabbi Nachmani wrote Zera Shimshon in memory of his only child, who died at a young age. The author stated that studying this work would bring heavenly blessings, a concept known as segula in Jewish tradition. The text has been published in various editions, some with explanatory commentary, and specific portions have been released as standalone works, such as the commentaries on the Book of Esther and Shir HaShirim (Song of Songs).

In addition to Zera Shimshon, Rabbi Nachmani authored Toldot Shimshon, a commentary on Pirkei Avot (Ethics of the Fathers), published in 1766.

== Biography of Author ==
Rabbi Shimshon Chaim Nachmani (שמשון חיים נחמני) was born in Modena, Italy. His father, Rabbi Nachman Michoel Nachmani, initially arranged for him to study with his maternal grandfather and the local Rabbi, Ephraim Cohen Lipshitz. Shimshon subsequently studied in Mantua with his Rabbi, Abiad Sar-Shalom Bazilla, author of a work named "Emunat Chachamim." Later on he studied Kabbalah in Reggio with his Rabbi, Benjamin Alexander HaKohen Vitali.

After being ordained, he initially moved to Mantua, becoming a local teacher, subsequently returning to Modena to both teach and lead a congregation. His main work Zera Shimshon (commentary on Chumash and Five Megillot) was published in Mantua (1778); his Toldot Shimshon on Pirke Avot was published in Leghorn (1776).

Rabbi Nachmani died on August 18, 1779 (6 Elul 5539) in Reggio, Italy.
