= Dirshu =

Jewish ultra-orthodox Torah study organization

- דרשו
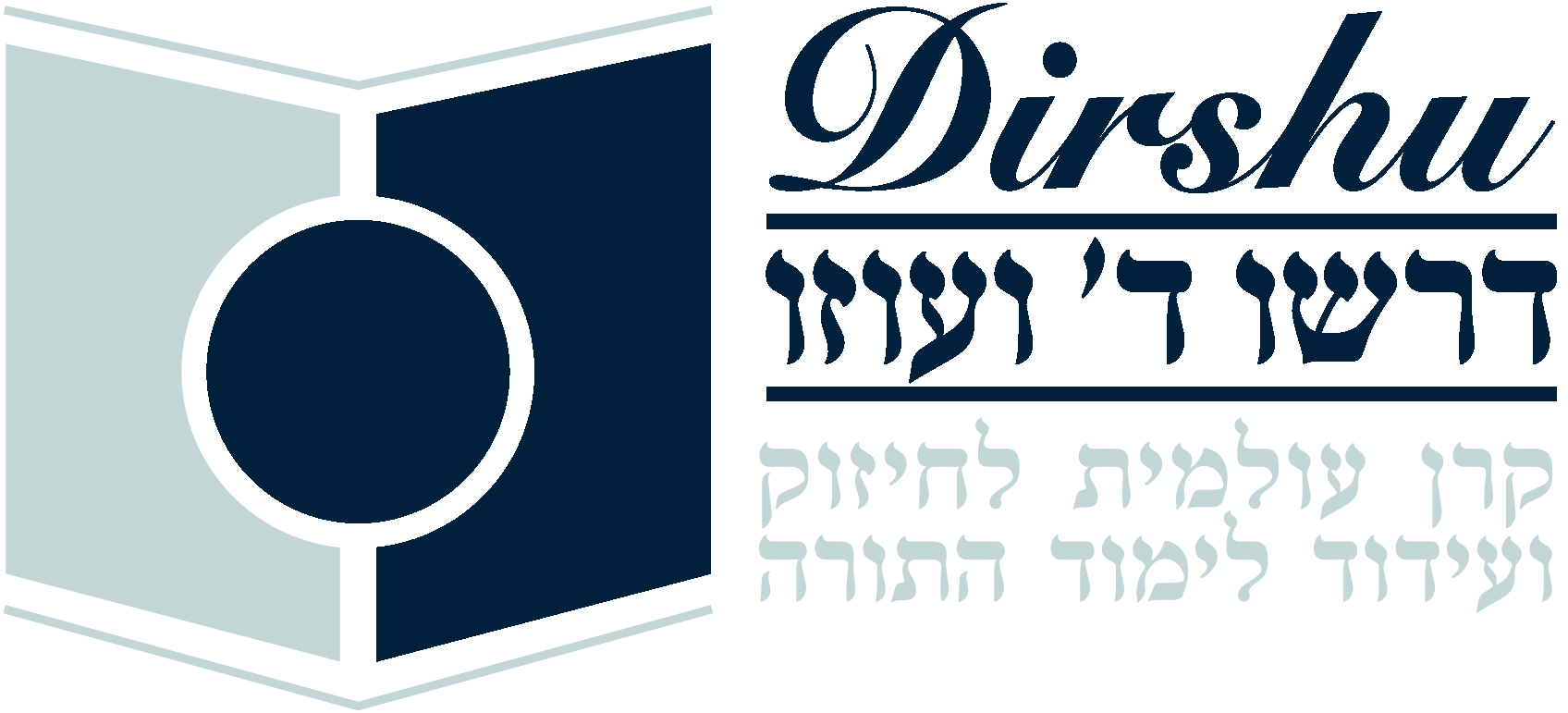
- Named after: Psalms 105:4
- Formation: 1997; 29 years ago
- Founder: Rabbi Dovid Hofstedter
- Founded at: Toronto, Canada
- Purpose: To strengthen and encourage Torah study
- Headquarters: Jerusalem, Israel
- Website: dirshu.co.il

Dirshu (Hebrew: דרשו, lit. "Seek") is an Orthodox Jewish international organization whose goal is to strengthen and encourage Torah study. Founded in 1997, the organization produces study cycles, sponsors shiurim (Torah lectures), furnishes and grades tests, and offers financial incentives to individuals and groups to learn and master Talmud, Halakha, and Mussar texts. It has also published new editions of traditional Jewish texts, and sponsored major gatherings to celebrate the completion of its study cycles. As of 2018, more than 150,000 people have participated in its programs, which have spread to 26 countries on five continents.

== Name ==
The organization's name is a Hebrew word for 'seek', based on the verse in Psalms 105:4: "Seek God and His might; seek His presence constantly".

== Overview ==
Dirshu was originally established to combat the challenges to Jewish religious life faced by baalebatim (working men) in the modern age. Jewish men who have had a yeshiva education are challenged by many negative influences in the workplace, such as Internet usage and lack of modesty. According to Dirshu founder Rabbi Dovid Hofstedter, by enabling these men to continue immersing themselves in Torah study, many of these challenges are rendered moot. Dedication to Torah learning also inculcates respect for the man by his wife and children. Hofstedter states, "There is no solution as effective as the blatt gemara [page of Talmud]".

As it gained popularity, the Dirshu program of daily study, review, and testing also appealed to Jewish men who were still enrolled in yeshiva and kollel. By fostering discipline and accountability for personal study, Dirshu enables participants to master their learning, and has produced serious Torah scholars.

== History ==
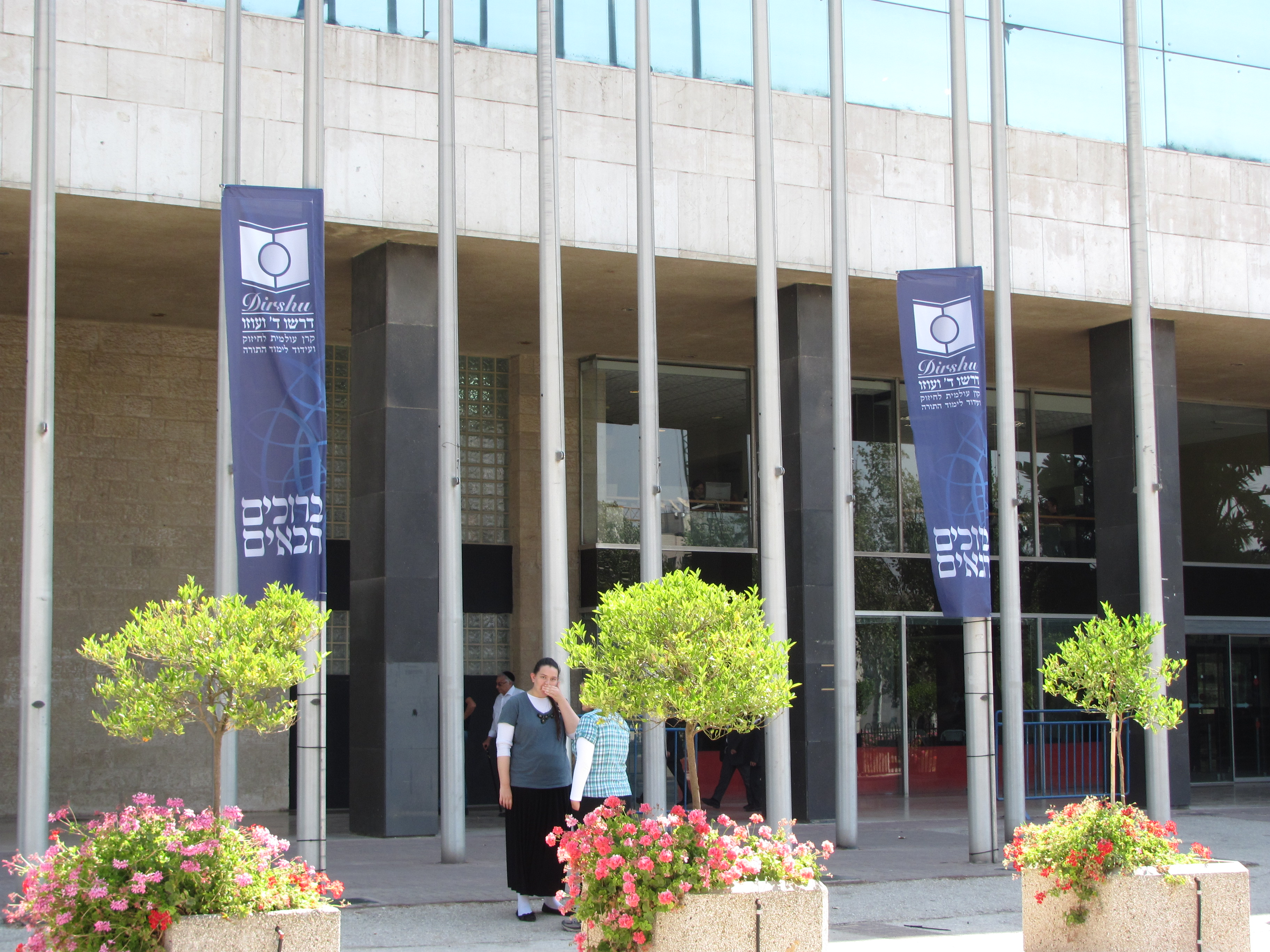
Dirshu banners hang outside the Jerusalem International Convention Center in July 2012 for an English-language Siyum HaShas for both men and women attendees

In 1997, Rabbi Dovid Hofstedter, a Canadian Jewish businessman working in real estate and property management, opened a small beis medrash (study hall) in his Toronto office. He sought like-minded Jewish businessmen to participate in an early-morning program that included chavrusa-style learning and a shiur (Torah lecture), followed by morning prayers and hot coffee. As an extra incentive, Hofstedter offered a small stipend, and introduced a system of regular tests by which participants could assess their progress.

The program was well-received, and word spread to other communities in Canada and the United States. The first Dirshu programs were established in Montreal, Detroit, Cleveland, and Chicago. Dirshu later spread to Israel, and in spring 2018 opened its 60th European branch, in Berlin. As of 2019, Dirshu operates in 26 countries on five continents.

While the Torah study programs are geared to men, Dirshu acknowledges the support given by wives to allow their husbands to spend their free time studying, considering them "equal partners" in the Torah learning. It invites wives to all Dirshu siyumim, events, and trips honoring their husbands for their Torah achievements.

== Programs ==
As of 2019, Dirshu offers twelve different learning programs geared to different levels and interests. Individuals may participate in a Dirshu learning program on their own or join a study group. Each program stresses continual review of the material, and includes regularly scheduled tests by which students can assess their mastery of the material. Stipends are awarded for outstanding test scores. Subject areas include:

=== Talmud ===
==== Kinyan Torah ====
When you learn with Dirshu, you're not only mesayem Shas [completing the Talmud], you sweat through it!

— Rabbi Yitzhak Scheiner, rosh yeshiva, Kaminetz Yeshiva, Jerusalem

This program, established in 2004, enables individuals and groups to study one daf (page) of the Babylonian Talmud per day following the Daf Yomi schedule, and be tested each month on their recall of all 30 pages studied that month. Additionally, every four months, participants are tested on the previous 120 pages.

In September 2012, the organization announced that 10,000 men in Israel had signed up to take the first test on the first 30 pages of the new Daf Yomi cycle. Kinyan Torah testing sites were also opened that month in more than 300 communities around the globe, including South Africa, Gibraltar, France, Russia, and cities across the United States. The program's popularity in Israel also indicates the importance of the stipend awarded for outstanding test scores, as many members of the Israeli Torah community struggle to make ends meet. As of 2013, Dirshu was paying more Israeli bnei Torah than any other organization.

==== Kinyan Shas ====
[W]hen you meet a Dirshu Jew, you're meeting someone who has studied every page that he learned, over and over and over. He is intimately familiar with vast amounts of material. He holds everything he learns tightly in the palm of his hand, and proves it by being tested regularly and rigorously.

— Rabbi Nachman Seltzer

Kinyan Shas (lit. "Acquiring Talmud") is an intensive program for the most serious learners. Participants study one daf (page) of the Babylonian Talmud with Rashi's commentary each day, following the Daf Yomi schedule. At the end of each month, they are tested on all 30 pages learned that month. Every six months, they take an additional test on all the material they have studied to date, from the beginning of the Daf Yomi cycle. The cumulative tests are new each time, prompting the student to diligently review and retain huge amounts of material over the seven-and-a-half-year Daf Yomi cycle. At the final test, the student is tested on his knowledge of the entire Talmud—a total of 2,711 pages of text and commentary. In addition, one who successfully completes the entire Talmud with Rashi in the first cycle will advance to a higher level of study in the second cycle, where he will be expected to learn the Talmud together with the commentary of Tosafot.

==== Amud HaYomi ====
Amud HaYomi participants study an amud of Talmud every day. The program includes tests and stipends like the other programs. It was set up on October 15, 2023, with more than 60,000 participants joining at the start of the program.

=== Halakha ===
==== Daf HaYomi B'Halacha ====
Daf HaYomi B'Halacha ("A Page a Day in Halakha") is a seven-year study cycle based on the authoritative halakhic work Mishnah Berurah by Rabbi Yisrael Meir Kagan (the Chofetz Chaim). The program combines the study of halakha and mussar, as participants study a page of the Mishnah Berurah, a selection of halakhic opinions from contemporary poskim, and a mussar selection from the Sefer Chofetz Chaim each day. The first study cycle was launched in April 2008, and the second cycle started on March 23, 2015.

==== Mishnah Berurah Yomi ====
Designed for working men, Mishnah Berurah Yomi ("Daily Mishnah Berurah") is a plan for studying one page of the text of the Mishnah Berurah per day. On this schedule, five days a week are devoted to learning and two days to review. Daily shiurim expounding the text are held in most major cities in the United States and Canada; online classes are also available through the Dirshu website. On this schedule, the entire Mishnah Berurah is completed in seven years.

==== Kinyan Halacha ====
Launched in 2006, Kinyan Halakha (lit. "Acquiring Jewish Law") is an in-depth learning program for men who wish to gain fluency in Jewish law and eventually serve as poskim. In the first five-and-a-half-year cycle, participants study, review, and are regularly tested on all areas of horaah (halakhic arbitration). In the second cycle, the course of study expands to include additional topics in Yoreh De'ah, Even Ha'ezer, and Choshen Mishpat. Kinyan Halacha has increased in popularity each cycle, with 3,700 sign-ups for the third cycle in 2017.

=== Mussar ===
==== Kinyan Chochma ====
This program, launched in 2017, encourages the daily study of mussar (Jewish ethical literature). Each day, participants study a short selection from a classic mussar text; these texts include Pirkei Avot with the commentary of Rabbeinu Yonah, Mesillat Yesharim, Tomer Devorah, Orchos Chaim by the Rosh, and Orchos Tzaddikim. The program is open to all participants, including those already enrolled into other Dirshu programs, and stipends are awarded for outstanding test scores.

== Kollel and yeshiva programs ==
Dirshu has expanded into kollels and yeshivas with special study and testing programs geared for avreichim (married students) and bachurim (yeshiva students). The idea of supplementing the traditional kollel or yeshiva learning program was a controversial one, but Dirshu was supported by Rabbi Michel Yehuda Lefkowitz and other Torah leaders. Today a full-time chaburah (study group) based on the Dirshu system is in place at Beth Medrash Govoha in Lakewood, New Jersey, the premier yeshiva in the United States.

== Day of Jewish Unity ==
In 2015, under the auspices of Acheinu, its kiruv arm, Dirshu initiated the first annual Day of Jewish Unity (also known as Yom Limud v'Tefillah). Individuals, schools, yeshivas, and synagogues are encouraged to pray for world peace and commit to better interpersonal relations. The English date each year varies, corresponding to the Hebrew yahrtzeit of Rabbi Yisrael Meir Kagan, whose seminal work, Chofetz Chaim, sets out the Torah laws on avoiding gossip and slander. Between 7 a.m. and 2 p.m., participants are requested to say Psalm 20 and Psalm 130, which beseech God for His protection and salvation. They are also asked to pray for "a world of peace, stability and civility", commit themselves to avoiding gossip and slander, and study the Sefer Chofetz Chaim.

The annual event attracts an estimated 100,000 participants worldwide. More than 10,000 people gather at the Western Wall to pray together.

== Outcomes ==
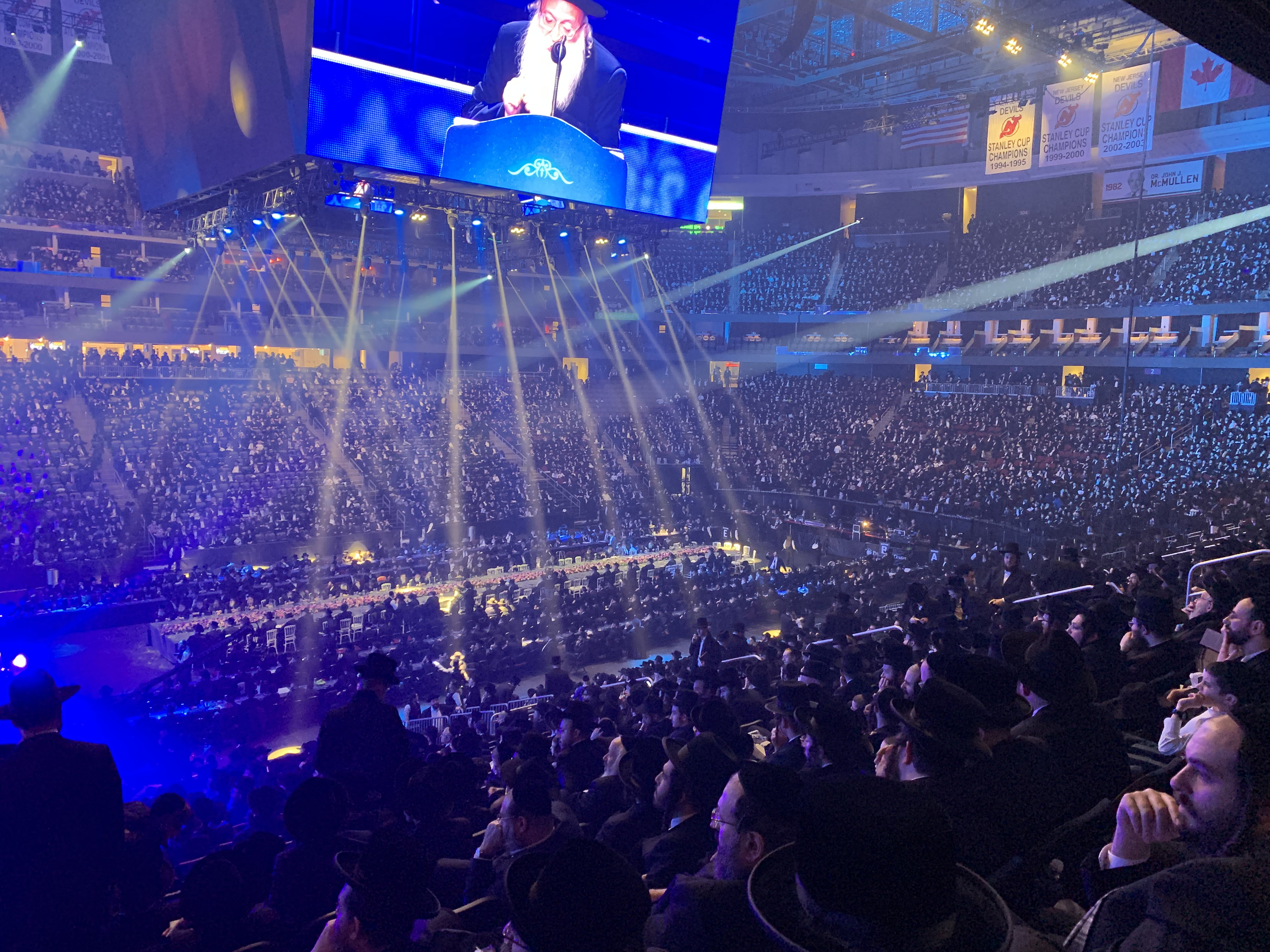
The Dirshu Siyum HaShas on February 9, 2020, in the Prudential Center, Newark, New Jersey

As of 2018, more than 150,000 people have participated in Dirshu's programs. An estimated 8 million pages of Talmud have been learned by 15,000 participants in Dirshu's Talmud learning programs.

=== Siyum HaShas ===
Participation in the siyumim (celebrations of completion) of the various programs is also on the rise. In 2012, Dirshu held a small Siyum HaShas in New York. In 2020, the organization planned 11 separate Siyum HaShas events. These include three events for a total of 20,000 attendees in the U.S., two events for 15,000 in Israel (Jerusalem and Tel Aviv), two events for 5,000 in Manchester, England; and siyumim in Paris, France; Cape Town, South Africa; Minsk, Russia; and Pinsk, Belarus, which were expected to attract thousands more.

== Organizational structure ==
Dirshu is unique among other Jewish and Torah organizations in that it lacks a central infrastructure. Participants do not pay membership dues or elect organizational officers. Instead, Dirshu maintains a small staff in its various branch offices in Israel, United States, Europe, South Africa, and Australia. The Israeli office, at 45 Hakablan Street in Har Nof, serves as the worldwide headquarters. It retains a staff of interpreters, including Russian, French, and Spanish speakers, to mark the tests sent in from around the world.

== Publications ==
Dirshu publications include:

- Dirshu (2012). Dirshu Shul Chumash. Israel Book Shop.
- Dirshu. Mishnah Berurah. Israel Bookshop. Includes a special "Biurim U'Mussafim" section citing the halakhic opinions of contemporary poskim.
- Dirshu. Sefer Chafetz Chaim/Sefer Shemiras Halashon. Israel Book Shop.
- Dirshu. Kinyan Shma'atsa – Nidah I. Israel Book Shop.
- Dirshu. Kinyan Shma'atsa – Nidah II. Israel Book Shop.
- Odyssey of a Revolution: The Dirshu Legacy Sefer. Israel Book Shop.
