= Seth Farber =

Rabbi Seth Farber
- שאול פרבר
- Born: 1967 (age 58–59); Riverdale, Bronx, New York
- Education: BA, New York University; MA in Judaic Studies, Yeshiva University; PhD, Hebrew University of Jerusalem
- Occupations: Rabbi, Historian, Founder and Director
- Known for: Founder of ITIM, advocacy for civil rights and Jewish life in Israel
- Title: Founder and Director, ITIM: Resources and Advocacy for Jewish Life
- Spouse: Michelle Cohen Farber
- Children: Moshe, Chani, Shira, Esti, Tali
- Website: ITIM website

Seth Farber (Hebrew: שאול פרבר; born 1967) is an American-Israeli Orthodox rabbi, historian, and founder and director of the Jewish life advocacy organization, ITIM.

== Early life and education ==
Farber grew up in Riverdale, Bronx, New York. He received a BA from New York University, was ordained as a rabbi by the Rabbi Isaac Elchanan Theological Seminary of Yeshiva University in 1991, received an MA in Judaic Studies from Yeshiva University in 1995, and a PhD from the Hebrew University in Jerusalem in 2000.

Farber's great-great-great-grandfather was the pre-eminent Central European Rabbi Moshe Sofer, better known as the Chasam Sofer (or Chatam Sofer).

== Career ==
Farber was a teacher at the Maimonides School in Brookline, Massachusetts. After moving to Israel, he founded ITIM, an organization committed to increasing participation in Jewish life by making Israel's religious establishment responsive to the diverse Jewish needs of the Jewish people. Farber is dedicated to "breaking the ultra-Orthodox monopoly over Jewish life in Israel," and to protecting Jewish Israelis' civil rights, particularly those of immigrants from the former Soviet Union. Farber is widely cited in the press on issues of religion-and-State in Israel.

The New York Times called Farber a "pragmatic idealist" who believes that Orthodox Jews — including the rabbinate — and non-Orthodox Jews need to learn "to trust each other" sufficiently to work together on difficult issues of personal status.

In 2015, Farber was awarded a Nefesh B'Nefesh Bonei Zion Prize, and in 2018, received an Israel Ministry of Aliyah and Integration Award for Outstanding Contribution to Israeli Society.

From 2018-2022 he served on the board of governors of the university of Haifa.

In 2021-2022 he wrote a Friday column for Israel Hayom, Israel’s largest daily newspaper.

In 2022 he was appointed by Israel’s finance minister and health minister to sit on the 18-member committee that decides on medicines, services and technologies to be included in Israel’s health basket.

== Personal life ==
Farber is married to Michelle Cohen Farber. They have five children: Moshe, Chani, Shira, Esti, and Tali, and live in Ra'anana, Israel.

== Selected works ==
=== Books ===
- Farber, Seth (2003). An American Orthodox Dreamer: Rabbi Joseph B. Soloveitchik and Boston's Maimonides School. Brandeis University Press, University Press of New England. ISBN 1-58465-338-8.
