= Romi Cohn =

Slovak-born American rabbi (1929–2020)

- Born: Avraham Hakohen Cohn; March 10, 1929; Bratislava, Czechoslovakia
- Died: March 24, 2020 (aged 91); Brooklyn, New York, U.S.

Romi Cohn (born Avraham Hakohen Cohn; March 10, 1929 – March 24, 2020) was a Slovak-born American rabbi, and real estate developer.

== Early life ==
Avraham Hakohen Cohn was born on March 10, 1929, in Bratislava, Czechoslovakia (now Slovakia). He was one of seven children.

=== World War II and the Holocaust ===
During World War II, most Slovak Jews were deported to concentration camps. While Cohn's family managed to sneak him into Hungary, his mother, as well as two of his brothers and two of his sisters died in camps. In Hungary, Cohn studied in a Hasidic yeshiva until 1944 when the Nazis occupied the country. At that point, at the age of 15, he escaped back into Slovakia and joined a partisan brigade fighting the Nazis. As a partisan, he provided Jewish refugees with housing and false Christian identifications. According to the Twitter account of Representative Max Rose, he was able to save 56 families through his efforts.

He wrote his story of his war years in a book titled The Youngest Partisan, published by Mesorah Publications. It was later adapted into a movie by Boruch Perlowitz.

== Career ==
After the war, Cohn emigrated to the U.S. He "became wealthy developing thousands of single-family homes on Staten Island" and "turned himself into an expert mohel, performing thousands of circumcisions and writing scholarly articles."

On January 29, 2020, at the invitation of his congressman Max Rose, Cohen delivered the opening prayer for the U.S. House of Representatives to commemorate the 75th anniversary of the liberation of Auschwitz and International Holocaust Remembrance Day.

=== Mohel ===
As a mohel, Cohn "set up an operating theater in his Staten Island home to circumcise adult Russian Jews who had not been able to undergo the ritual as infants because of Soviet strictures."

In almost all of the circumcisions Cohn performed, he practiced the ancient controversial practice of metzitzah b'peh in which the mohel places his mouth directly on the circumcision wound to draw blood away from the cut.

== Personal life ==
In the U.S., Cohn married Malvine Geldzahler. They had no children. Cohn died on March 24, 2020, at Maimonides Medical Center in Brooklyn, New York, of respiratory distress caused by pneumonia and COVID-19. He was 91 years old.
