= Dovid Hofstedter =

Canadian real estate investor and philanthropist

David Hofstedter
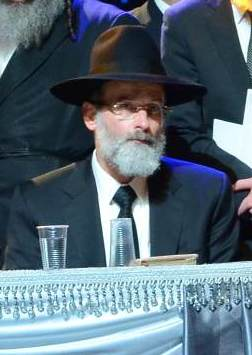
- Born: 1954 or 1955 (age 71–72); Toronto, Canada
- Occupations: Real estate investor; philanthropist; rabbi

Rabbi David Hofstedter is a Canadian real estate investor, philanthropist, rabbi and the founder of Dirshu.

== Early life and career ==
Hofstedter was born to holocaust survivor parents that emigrated from Europe to Toronto. In 1993, Hofstedter founded the real estate investment, and property management firm Davpart Inc.

== Philanthropy ==
Hofstedter founded Dirshu, an Orthodox Jewish international organization whose goal is to strengthen and encourage Torah study, in 1997.
