= Hadran (organization) =

Hadran is a Jewish women's Talmud study organization based in Jerusalem. The organization is the organizer of the Women's Siyum HaShas, a celebration which marks the seven-year daily study schedule of the Babylonian Talmud known as Daf Yomi.

== Overview ==
Hadran was founded in 2018 by a group of Israelis who had studied the Talmud together according to the Daf Yomi ("daily page") schedule. The co-founders of the group are Rabbanit Michelle Cohen Farber and Shoshana Baker. The purpose of the organization is to make the study of Talmud accessible to Jewish women at all levels of education. The group has produced various resources to support and enhance personal and group study. The organization also aims to advance the status of women in the world of Talmud, as in Jewish history, Talmud was predominantly studied by Jewish men.

=== Women's Siyum HaShas ===
In 2020, the organization hosted the first women's celebration marking the completion of the traditional seven-year cycle of Talmud study, an event which was attended by over 3,000 Jewish women. The celebration, which is known as a Siyum HaShas, took place in Jerusalem and included participants the United States, Canada, the United Kingdom and Australia. The study of the Talmud promoted by Hadran follows a daily schedule of study instituted in 1923 for Jewish men, by which, a double-sided folio is studied each day for 7.5 years.

== See also ==
- Drisha Institute
- Maharat
