= ITIM (nonprofit organization) =

Israeli nonprofit organization

- Founded: 2002
- Founder: Seth Farber
- Purpose: Judaism, Israel
- Location: Jerusalem, Israel
- Website: https://en.itim.org.il/

ITIM (/iˈtɪm/ ee-TIM, Hebrew: עתים) is an Israeli not-for-profit organization founded in 2002 by Open Orthodox Rabbi Seth Farber to challenge the authority of the Israeli Rabbinate in matters of Jewish identity and Jewish life. ITIM addresses government policies that govern personal status in legal matters such as registering marriages and the right to enter Israel under the Law of Return that are determined in part by an individual's legal status as Christian, Muslim or Jewish.

The Hebrew word ITIM (עתים) means "seasons" or "times" and is also a Hebrew acronym for "support and advocacy."

== History ==
ITIM has been active in advocating the reform of Israeli laws governing conversion to Judaism. In Israel, the Orthodox Rabbinate controls the recognition of conversions of Judaism; the Rabbinate does not recognize the validity of Conservative or Reform conversions, and in some cases has also refused to accept Orthodox conversions made by rabbis abroad.

In 2017 ITIM filed a lawsuit against the Ministry of Religious Services, claiming that the ministry was violating a law allowing women to immerse themselves in a mikveh (Jewish ritual bath) without an attendant present. ITIM has also challenged practices of the Chief Rabbinate in adding individuals to a marriage blacklist, which would "prevent them, their children and their maternal relatives from ever marrying in Israel."
