= Siyum =

Completion of a unit of Torah study

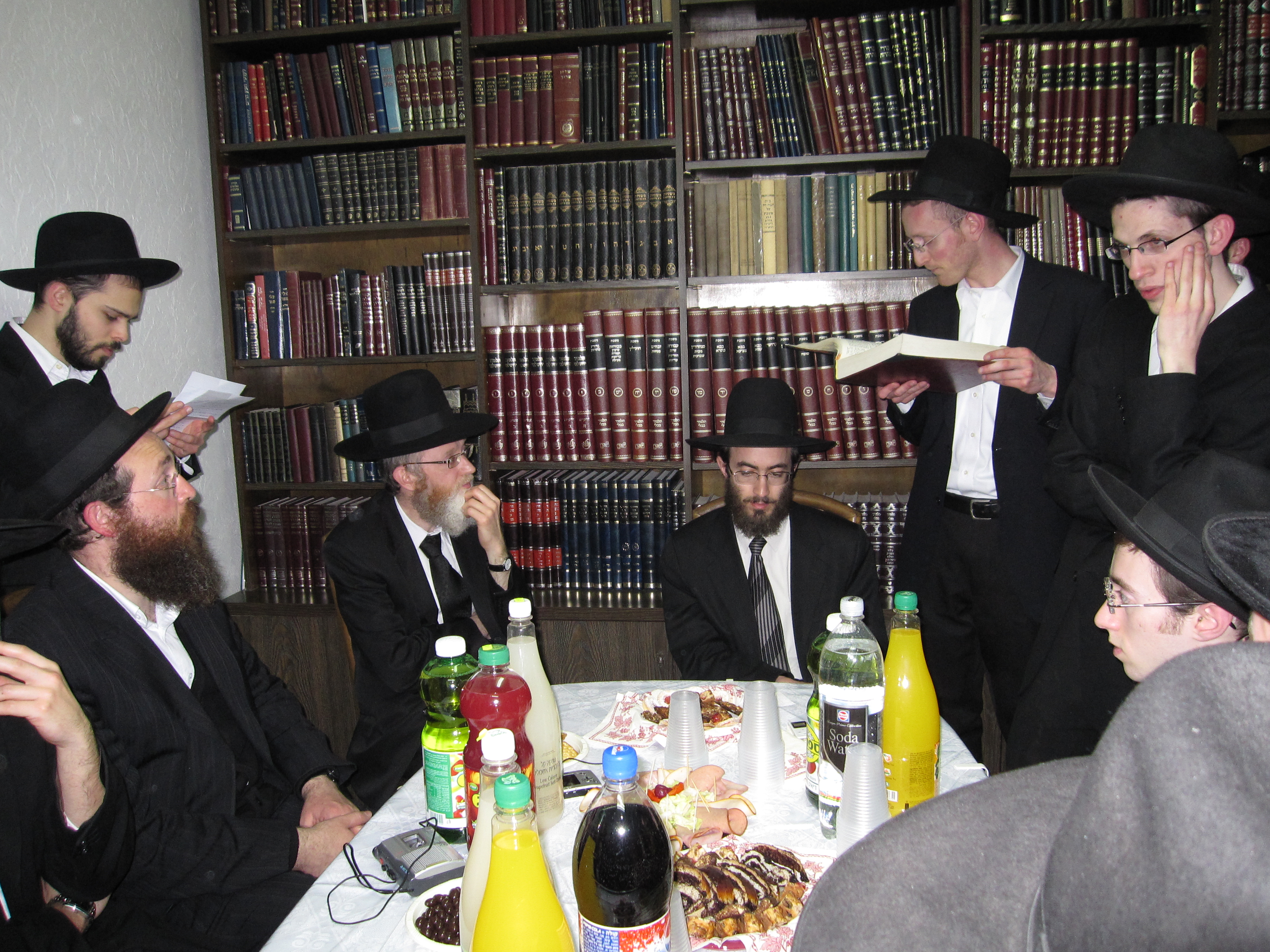
A siyum on Tractate Ketubot. Rabbi Asher Arieli is seen third from left.

A siyum (Hebrew: סִיּוּם, romanized: siyyum, lit. 'completion') is the completion of any established unit of Torah study in Judaism. The most common units are a single volume of the Talmud, or of Mishnah, but other units of learning may lead to a siyum.

The typical structure of a siyum includes a conclusion of the study, reading of the Hadran text, kaddish, and a celebratory meal.

The custom to have a siyum is first mentioned in the Talmud: "Abaye said: grant me my reward, for when I see a young Torah scholar who has completed a tractate, I make a celebration for the rabbis."

== Type of study ==
The typical siyum is on a single book of Talmud or an entire seder "order" (plural sedarim) of the Mishna. This is because the Talmud explains the Mishna, with each tractate of the Mishnah being relatively short, but the Talmudical version occupies an entire book.

The Talmud and Mishnah are organized in six sedarim. Sometimes, a siyum may be made on completing all the Mishnah of a seder rather than completing all six at once. Conversely, a larger Talmudic siyum than usual may cover all Talmud in a seder or even all of the Talmud comprising all six sedarim. Such a siyum is known as a Siyum HaShas; HaShas is a Hebrew abbreviation for "the six orders."

Starting in the 20th century, other religious topics have been the topic of siyum, though often less formal than the standard Mishnah/Talmud siyum. One of the most common is the completion of the Mishna Berurah, a detailed work of the rules Jews practice each day, each Sabbath, and relating to each festival. Young schoolchildren sometimes make an informal siyum on completing one of the books of the Torah.

=== Shared study ===
In many cases, no one completes the entire unit of study. Instead, the unit is split among participants, each of whom completes one section. Jointly, the participants complete the whole unit.

This is especially common for completing the entire six orders of the Mishnah after a person dies before the Yahrzeit and frequently for one order of the Mishnah within the month after their death.

This format is also sometimes used to complete all the Talmud, with typically a single tractate assigned to each participant (though minor tractates may be combined or larger tractates broken down further). In huge groups organized communally, the Talmud may be broken down to the folio level, with thousands of participants. This is sometimes called a Shas-A-Thon, as it allows the enormous body of material to be completed jointly in a short period, sometimes a single day.

=== Siyum HaShas ===
An event known as a Siyum HaShas marks the completion of the entire Talmud. This is a monumental undertaking, consisting of 2,711 folios (5,422 pages) of study.

The conclusion of the Daf Yomi study program is the largest Siyum HaShas event, with hundreds of thousands of participants. In this program, a study schedule includes a specific daf or blatt (folio) to be studied by all participants on any particular day. This standard calendar covers the entire Talmud approximately every seven and a half years. Enormous siyum gatherings follow, arranged around the world. The next Daf Yomi Siyum HaShas will be on June 7, 2027, upon the completion of Tractate Niddah.

The main event for the 13th Siyum HaShas, organized by Agudath Israel of America, took place on January 1, 2020, in MetLife Stadium in New Jersey with a sellout crowd of over 90,000. Other Siyum HaShas events were held globally, with several "satellite" Agudath Israel locations around the United States and several others arranged in the United States and Israel by the Dirshu organization.

Although Siyum HaShas is most commonly associated with Daf Yomi, this is not always true. Many serious students of the Talmud have completed it on their schedules, either by themselves, with a partner, or in a small study group. However, it is not very common, even among regular Talmudic students and researchers, and those who do so are often viewed as elites.

== Format ==
A siyum usually includes:

- one or more participants to the study performing a reading and explanation of the last topic studied
- the same or another participant reading the lengthy Hadran prayer (which may be broken up amongst participants)
- recitation of a special version of the Kaddish; this version is the longest form of Kaddish, including the lengthy introductory section used at burial, as well as the lengthy paragraph of Kaddish d'Rabannan
- greetings and congratulatory remarks
- a celebratory meal, or seudat mitzvah, which may also include additional speeches

The term siyum sometimes refers to the celebratory meal itself.

== Common occasions ==
An enduring custom is for the community to complete a unit of Torah or tractate(s) of Talmud during the 30 days of shloshim or first year following the death of a beloved one and hold a communal siyum thereafter, in tribute and honor of the deceased's memory (see also Bereavement in Judaism).

It has become customary for synagogues to arrange a siyum on the morning before Passover to allow those fasting for the Fast of the Firstborn to break their fast, taking advantage of the halakhic principle that prioritizes Torah study.

A siyum ha-sefer “completion of the book” is also held as a ceremonial completion and dedication of a Torah scroll, the most important Jewish ritual object, which is kept in the Torah ark of a synagogue. This is not technically related to the other forms of siyum.
