= Boruch Perlowitz =

American Hasidic filmmaker

- Born: 1990 or 1991 (age 34–35)
- Occupations: Filmmaker; game show host
- Years active: 2017–present
- Website: boruchperlowitz.com

Boruch Perlowitz (born 1990 or 1991) is an American Hasidic filmmaker and game show host known for his contributions to Jewish cinema.

== Career ==
Perlowitz released his first movie, The Edge, in 2017, an action thriller film. The plot, based on a book by Rabbi Nachman Seltzer, portrays a young man named Keith through his journey as a baal teshuva. Keith, a champion windsurfer who travels to Israel to compete in an international windsurfing competition, experiences a near-fatal accident and decides to make significant changes in his life. However, he soon finds himself confronted by a dark secret from his past that threatens to unravel his newfound resolve. Keith was played by Gav Hool and Perlowitz himself played a minor part in the film as Shalom, a hospital chaplain who guides Keith in his journey.

Following the success of The Edge, which was seen as unprecedented in the Orthodox Jewish world, he released his second thriller movie The Skull Of A Genius, which is based on a true story involving the Maharal of Prague. It also featured Gav Hool, as well as main actor Dov Lieb.

Perlowitz later released Desperate Measures in 2021. It is set in Lakewood, New Jersey, and follows the story of Yanky Greenberg, a 15-year-old boy, who tries to saves his father's life. Yanky is played by Yosef Gininger, who also released a song and music video, titled "I Need You Now", for the movie. This was followed by its sequel, 2 Desperate, in 2023.

His latest film, The Youngest Partisan, was released in 2024. The plot is based on the true story of Romi Cohn, a young man during World War II who joins the partisans, as described in his book of the same name. The film was his most expensive, produced at a cost of over $800,000. It features main actor Shmiel Dovid Stein as Romi.

== Other works ==
Besides for his film producing, he also works as a teacher and a game show host. He is also the founder of The Jewish Platform website.

== Personal life ==
Perlowitz lives with his wife and children in Howell, New Jersey. He previously lived in Israel briefly after he got married and attended The Jerusalem Kollel.

== Filmography ==
Year	Title	Genre
2017	The Edge	Action thriller
2019	Skull of a Genius	Thriller
2021	Desperate Measures	Drama
2023	2 Desperate	Drama
2024	The Youngest Partisan	Historical drama
2026	Anash (Web series)	Action thriller
