= Ephraim Cohen-Lipschütz =

Italian rabbi & scholar

Ephraim Cohen-Lipschütz (Hebrew: אפרים כהן) was an Italian rabbi, Talmudical scholar, and writer active in Modena during the latter half of the 17th century.

His responsa are found in several rabbinic works of the period, including Isaac Lampronti's Paḥad Yiẓḥak; Joseph Ergas' Dibre Yosef, which discusses the laws of ransom; and Samson Morpurgo's Shemesh Ẓedakah. According to Nepi, Cohen-Lipschütz was the teacher of Rabbi Ishmael Cohen, author of Zeraʿ Emet, and of Samson Ḥayyim Naḥmani, author of Zera Shimshon and Toledot Shimshon.
