= Segula (Kabbalah) =

Protective or benevolent charm or ritual in Kabbalistic and Talmudic tradition

A segula (Hebrew: סגולה, romanized: səḡullā, lit. 'talisman', pl. סגולות səḡulloṯ) is a protective or benevolent incantation or ritual in Kabbalistic and Talmudic tradition.

== Etymology ==
In medieval magic, "sigil" (/ˈsɪdʒɪl/) was commonly used to refer to occult signs representing various angels and demons the practitioner might summon. In this context, the term sigil derives from the Latin sigillum "seal." Maimonides strongly urges against writing sigils on the back of a mezuzah, turning it into an amulet, in Mishneh Torah, "Laws of Tefilin and Mezuzzah", 5:4.

Hebrew: אֲבָל אֵלּוּ שֶׁכּוֹתְבִין מִבִּפְנִים שְׁמוֹת הַמַּלְאָכִים אוֹ שֵׁמוֹת קְדוֹשִׁים אוֹ פָּסוּק אוֹ חוֹתָמוֹת הֲרֵי הֵן בִּכְלַל מִי שֶׁאֵין לָהֶם חֵלֶק לָעוֹלָם הַבָּא. שֶׁאֵלּוּ הַטִּפְּשִׁים לֹא דַּי לָהֶם שֶׁבִּטְּלוּ הַמִּצְוָה אֶלָּא שֶׁעָשׂוּ מִצְוָה גְּדוֹלָה שֶׁהִיא יִחוּד הַשֵּׁם שֶׁל הַקָּדוֹשׁ בָּרוּךְ הוּא וְאַהֲבָתוֹ וַעֲבוֹדָתוֹ כְּאִלּוּ הוּא קָמֵעַ שֶׁל הֲנָיַת עַצְמָן כְּמוֹ שֶׁעָלָה עַל לִבָּם הַסָּכָל שֶׁזֶּהוּ דָּבָר הַמְהַנֶּה בְּהַבְלֵי הָעוֹלָם:
Those, however, who write the names of angels, other sacred names, verses, or forms, on the inside [of a mezuzah] are among those who do not have a portion in the world to come. Not only do these fools nullify the mitzvah, but furthermore, they make from a great mitzvah [which reflects] the unity of the name of the Holy One, blessed be He, the love of Him, and the service of Him, a talisman [Hebrew: קמע, romanized: qāmēʿ, lit. 'amulet'] for their own benefit.

Segula appears in the Hebrew Bible in Exodus 19:5 and Deuteronomy 7:6, where God refers to the Jewish nation as his segula (treasure). The root of this word, segol, is the name of a Hebrew vowel-point represented by three dots. According to the Chaim ibn Attar, a segula is "a charm that supersedes logic".

== List of segulot ==
Following is a list of popular or well-known segulot.

=== Fertility and childbirth ===
- Distributing chai rotel (about 54 liters) of drink at the Tomb of Rabbi Shimon bar Yochai in Meron on Lag BaOmer is considered a propitious remedy for infertility, as well as for helping a person find his mate or recover from serious illness
- Acting as kvatterin "godmother" for a baby boy at his brit milah is a segula for childless couples to have children of their own
- Studying the works of the kabbalist Zera Shimshon
- Eating an etrog or etrog preserves facilitates an easy childbirth
- Drinking from the waters of the spring of Sataf in Israel across from the Monastery of Saint John in the Wilderness prevents a breech birth

=== Protection from harm ===
Wearing a red string

- Wearing a red string cut from a longer length that has been wound around Rachel's Tomb is an ancient tradition that protects the wearer from danger The only classic source which does mention the red thread expressly forbids its use, saying that tying a red thread on one’s fingers is an idolatrous practice (darkei emori).
- Giving tzedakah (charity money) to a traveler to donate when he arrives at his destination helps protect the traveler from harm
- Concentrating on the phrase "There is none but Him [God]" (Hebrew: אֵין עוֹד מִלְּבַדּוֹ׃, romanized: ʾēn ʿoḏ ˌmiləḇodˈdo) shields a person from danger

=== Marriage ===
- Praying at the Tomb of Jonathan ben Uzziel in Amuka, Israel is considered propitious for finding one’s spouse within the coming year
- Praying at the Western Wall for 40 consecutive days is considered a segula for finding one’s spouse
- Holding the jewelry of a bride while she is escorted to her chuppah is a segula for finding a spouse

=== Other ===
- Buying a burial plot is a segula for a long life
- Placing a pigeon on a person’s navel is efficacious for curing jaundice
- Giving tzedaka in the merit of Rabbi Meir is a segula for finding a lost object
- Buying a new knife for Rosh Hashanah is a propitious remedy for livelihood
- One can hang a special note around the neck of a chicken and use it to identify a thief
