= Siyum HaShas =

Celebration of the completion of the Daf Yomi

Siyum HaShas סיום הש"ס
- Logo of the main Siyum HaShas organized by Agudath Israel of America
- Status: Active
- Frequency: Every 2,711 days
- Venue: International
- Years active: 103
- Inaugurated: 2 February 1931
- Founder: Rabbi Meir Shapiro
- Most recent: 1 January 2020
- Next event: 6 June 2027
- Attendance: 93,000 (2012)
- Organizer: World Agudath Israel

Siyum HaShas (Hebrew: סיום הש"ס, lit. "completion of the Six Orders [of the Talmud]") is a celebration of the completion of the Daf Yomi (daily Talmud folio) program, a roughly seven-and-a-half-year cycle of learning the Oral Torah and its commentaries, in which each of the 2,711 pages of the Babylonian Talmud are covered in sequence – one page per day. The first Daf Yomi cycle began on the first day of Rosh Hashanah 5684 (11 September 1923); the thirteenth cycle concluded on 4 January 2020 and the fourteenth cycle began the following day, to be concluded on 7 June 2027. The Siyum HaShas marks both the end of the previous cycle and the beginning of the next, and is characterized by celebratory speeches, as well as singing and dancing. The next day, the new cycle begins again.

For Jews for whom Torah study is a daily obligation, the publicity and excitement surrounding the Siyum HaShas has resulted in more participants, more Daf Yomi shiurim (lessons), and more Siyum locations with each cycle. Since 1990, attendance at the main Siyum HaShas in America, organized by the Agudath Israel of America, has increased dramatically, necessitating the booking of larger arenas and stadiums. The 13th Siyum HaShas on January 1, 2020, took place in MetLife Stadium in New Jersey with a sellout crowd of over 90,000. Other organizations, such as Dirshu, and neighborhood groups and synagogues in cities around the world, also hold Siyum HaShas events expected to attract tens of thousands of participants.

== Background ==
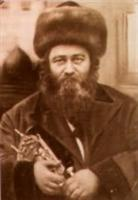
Rabbi Meir Shapiro, initiator of Daf Yomi.

The novel idea of Jews in all parts of the world studying the same daf each day, with the goal of completing the entire Talmud, was put forth at the First World Congress of the World Agudath Israel in Vienna on 16 August 1923 by Rabbi Meir Shapiro, then Rav of Sanok, Poland, and future rosh yeshiva of the Chachmei Lublin Yeshiva. In those years, only some of the 63 tractates of the Talmud were being studied regularly, such as Berachot, Shabbat, and Eruvin, which deal with practical laws, while others, such as Zevachim and Temurah, were hardly studied. Shapiro also viewed the program as a way to unify the Jewish people. His idea was greeted enthusiastically by the nearly 600 delegates at the Congress, including many Torah leaders from Europe and America, who accepted it as a universal obligation for all Jews. The first cycle of Daf Yomi commenced on the first day of Rosh Hashanah 5684 (11 September 1923).

=== Process ===
With 2,711 pages in the Talmud, one Daf Yomi cycle takes about 7 years, 5 months. The completion of each tractate is typically celebrated with a small siyum, and the completion of the entire cycle is celebrated at an event known as the Siyum HaShas.

Daf Yomi can be studied alone, with a chavrusa (study partner), in a daily shiur (class) led by a rabbi or teacher, via a telephone shiur, CD-ROM, or audio and online resources. Typically, Daf Yomi shiurim are held in synagogues, yeshivas, and offices. They also take place in the United States Senate, Wall Street board rooms, and on the Long Island Rail Road, in the last car of two commuter trains departing Far Rockaway at 7:51 am and 8:15 am, respectively, for Manhattan. Daf Yomi shiurim have been piped into the in-flight sound system of El Al flights. A typical Daf Yomi shiur lasts one hour. Participants study the text together with the commentary of Rashi.

The Schottenstein Edition of the Babylonian Talmud, an English-language translation and interpretation published in 73 volumes between 1990 and 2004 by ArtScroll, has been credited with significantly increasing the number of English-language participants in the Daf Yomi program. The Schottenstein Talmud has also been translated into Hebrew. Additional resources to assist those endeavoring to complete the cycle for the first time are audiotapes, online websites, and iPods preloaded with lectures covering every page of the Talmud. The Dafyomi Advancement Forum, founded by Kollel Iyun Hadaf in 1996, is a free resource center offering English-language translations, outlines, charts, analyses and lectures on every daf, as well as answers to any question by email. Meoros HaDaf HaYomi, founded in 1999, disseminates a weekly Daf Yomi study sheet in both Hebrew and English available by email and regular mail. It has recorded shiurim on the daf on CD-ROM in English, Hebrew, Yiddish, and French.

== Siyum HaShas Programs ==
As with any siyum, the Siyum HaShas is both an end and a beginning. Dozens and even hundreds of Gedolei Torah (Torah leaders) attend each Siyum HaShas. A distinguished Rav is honored with the recital of the last topic on the last page of Talmud and the saying of the Hadran ("We will return") prayer. The Rav then delivers a scholarly lecture. Another honoree begins the new Daf Yomi cycle with the recital of the first topic on the first page of Talmud. Other rabbis are invited to deliver speeches on the Talmud and on the significance of the event. A special Kaddish, the Kaddish Hagadol, is also said. The program is rounded out with spirited singing and dancing.

=== 1st Siyum HaShas ===
The 1st Siyum HaShas took place on 2 February 1931 (15 Shevat 5691) in several cities in Europe and in Jerusalem, with the main venue being the newly opened Chachmei Lublin Yeshiva in Lublin, Poland. Tens of thousands of Jews attended these events. Rabbi Meir Shapiro presided over the Siyum in his yeshiva in the presence of many leaders of Polish Jewry. In the United States, Siyumim were held in Baltimore and Philadelphia.

=== 2nd Siyum HaShas ===
The 2nd Siyum HaShas was held on 27 June 1938 (28 Sivan 5698). Again the main venue was the Chachmei Lublin Yeshiva, but the founder of that yeshiva and the Daf Yomi program, Rabbi Meir Shapiro, was not present, having died suddenly in 1933 at the age of 46. An estimated 15,000 to 20,000 Jews came from all over Poland to celebrate the milestone together with many Torah scholars, including the Rebbes of Boyan-Cracow, Sochatchov, Sadigura, and Modzhitz, Rabbi Menachem Ziemba, and Rabbi Dov Berish Weidenfeld. So many Gedolim were gathered in one place that many halachic queries were sent directly to Lublin. The two-day event culminated with the completion of a Sefer Torah in memory of Shapiro.

In the United States, Siyumim were held in Baltimore, Philadelphia, and Brooklyn.

In Mandatory Palestine, organizers planned to hold a Siyum in the Zikhron Meir neighborhood of Bnei Brak (named for Rabbi Meir Shapiro). It was cancelled at the last minute by the British mandatory government, which banned all mass gatherings for fear of "anti-government demonstrations".

=== 3rd Siyum HaShas ===
The 3rd Siyum HaShas was held on 19 November 1945 (14 Kislev 5706), with the main venues in Tel Aviv, Haifa, and Jerusalem. (The Siyum in Tel Aviv, attended by more than 3,000, was delayed one day due to the British-imposed curfew.) Coming as it did after the Holocaust, this Siyum was dedicated to the memory of the millions of Jews who had perished. A Siyum HaShas was also held in the displaced persons camp in Feldafing, Germany, by a small group of survivors.

In the United States, the Siyum was commemorated in the Boro Park section of Brooklyn, on Manhattan's West Side, and in Detroit.

=== 4th Siyum HaShas ===
The 4th Siyum HaShas on 13 April 1953 (28 Nisan 5713) also had its main venue in Israel. An estimated 10,000 gathered for the main event in Mea Shearim, following local siyums and speeches by leading rabbis in over half a dozen Jerusalem synagogues. Thousands attended the Siyum HaShas in Tel Aviv and danced afterwards at the central bus station. Well-attended Siyums also took place in Bnei Brak, Petah Tikva, Haifa, and Tiberias.

In New York City, the 4th Siyum HaShas was celebrated at the Young Israel of Borough Park, as well as in Bensonhurst, Brownsville, West Side of Manhattan, and the Bronx.

=== 5th Siyum HaShas ===
The 5th Siyum HaShas took place on 5 September 1960 (13 Elul 5720). In Jerusalem's Kikar HaShabbat, an open-air square at the intersection of the Mea Shearim and Geula neighborhoods, distinguished Torah leaders addressed the thousands of attendees. In Bnei Brak, police estimated an audience of between 12,000 and 15,000 in an outdoor field. Over 5,000 attended the Siyum in Tel Aviv, where Rabbi Yosef Shlomo Kahaneman, the Ponevezher Rav, delivered a hadran that lasted nearly two hours.

In the United States, Rabbi Aharon Kotler presided over the 5th Siyum HaShas at the Zeirei Agudas Yisroel convention in New York. Other Siyums took place in New York City and Baltimore.

=== 6th Siyum HaShas ===
The 6th Siyum HaShas was celebrated in many venues in Israel. The largest gatherings were at Jerusalem's International Convention Center on 29 January 1968 (28 Tevet 5728), the Wagschal Hall in Bnei Brak, and the Culture Palace in Tel Aviv (home of the Israel Philharmonic Orchestra) on 30 January 1968. At the Tel Aviv event, the choirs of Ger, Vizhnitz, Modzhitz, and Chabad, together with a Sephardi boys choir and a Haredi Yerushalmi choir, performed between speeches.

In London, the Agudath Israel of Britain organized a Siyum HaShas at the Town Hall in Stamford Hill, attended by groups from Manchester, Gateshead, and Sunderland, and Agudath Israel leaders from Europe.

The largest Siyum HaShas to date in the United States took place on 28 January 1968 at the Bais Yaakov of Boro Park with 300 people in attendance. Other Siyums were held in New York City in Washington Heights, the Bronx, the West Side of Manhattan, and Bensonhurst; Baltimore; Boston; Chicago; and Los Angeles.

=== 7th Siyum HaShas ===
Tens of thousands of participants attended the 7th Siyum HaShas in Jerusalem, which was held on 23 June 1975 (14 Tammuz 5735). The event, which took place in the large courtyard of the Bais Yaakov High School, attracted thousands of religious schoolchildren wearing a special Daf Yomi badge, together with their teachers. Three hundred members of the Moetzes Gedolei HaTorah were seated on the huge dais. The central celebration in Tel Aviv, again held at the Culture Palace and again featuring numerous choirs, also drew a huge attendance. In Bnei Brak, more than 10,000 people pressed into the Great Synagogue; the doors and some furnishings buckled under the crush of the crowd. After the ceremony and speeches, the crowd spilled out onto Rabbi Akiva Street for dancing. The Siyum was also marked in Netanya, Safed, Ramat Gan, and, for the first time, in Giv'atayim.

In the United States, the 7th Siyum HaShas was held on 15 June 1975 at the Manhattan Center in New York City, drawing an audience of over 5,000. At this Siyum, the Council of Torah Sages of Agudath Israel of America permanently dedicated the Siyum HaShas to the memory of the six million Jews murdered during the Holocaust. Other Siyums took place in Philadelphia and Cleveland. Around the world, Siyums were held in England, Belgium, Switzerland, Brazil, and Mexico.

=== 8th Siyum HaShas ===
The mid-1970s and early 1980s saw an increase in the Haredi population worldwide, fueling the growth of the Daf Yomi program and an increase in locations for the Siyum HaShas beginning with the 8th Siyum. At the conclusion of the eighth cycle of Daf Yomi, The New York Times estimated that 40,000 individuals worldwide had participated in the seven-and-a-half-year learning cycle. According to Agudath Israel, close to 250,000 people worldwide participated in the 8th Siyum HaShas. The largest attendance was in Israel, with 10,000 attendees at the Yad Eliyahu Arena in Tel Aviv on 21 November 1982 (5 Kislev 5743), 10,000 at Jerusalem's International Convention Center, thousands in Bnei Brak at Wagschal Hall, and hundreds in Haifa, Petah Tikva, and, for the first time, in Ashdod. At the Jerusalem event, a special certificate was awarded to four men who had completed all eight cycles of Daf Yomi.

The main Siyum HaShas in the United States was celebrated on 14 November 1982 at the Felt Forum in New York City, with over 5,000 participants. This program was broadcast to gatherings in Chicago, Los Angeles, Toronto, and Montreal. Other Siyums took place in Detroit; Cleveland; and Monsey, New York.

The chairman for the 8th Daf Yomi Siyum was Yechiel Benzion “Benny” Fishoff, who gave greetings at the event marking the completion of the Talmud and the beginning of the next Daf Yomi cycle.

=== 9th Siyum HaShas ===
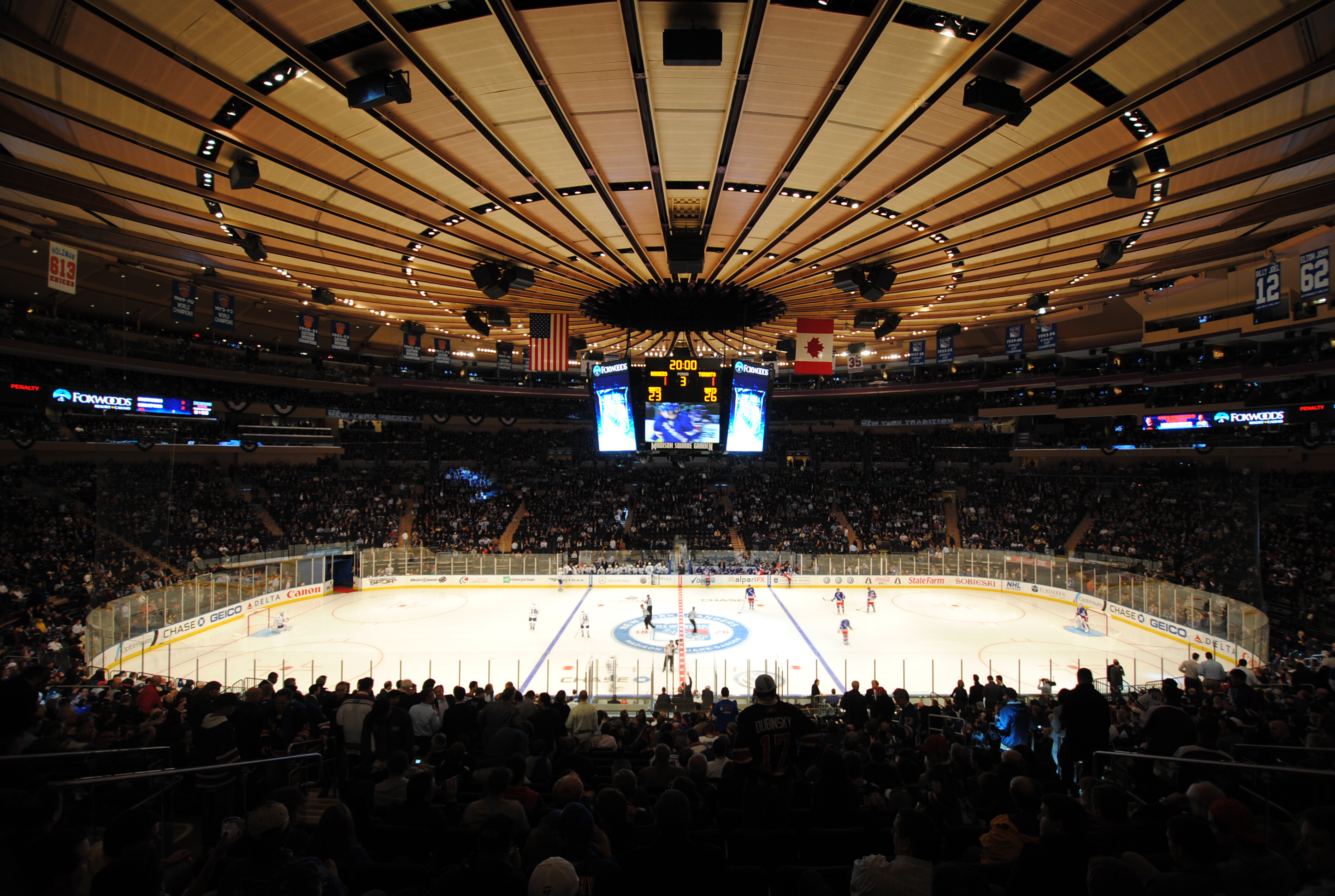
Madison Square Garden, site of the 9th, 10th, and 11th Siyum HaShas in New York.

At the Agudath Israel of America convention following the 8th Siyum HaShas in New York, Agudah chairman Rabbi Moshe Sherer announced that he wished to book Madison Square Garden for the next Siyum HaShas, to be held on 26 April 1990. Many were skeptical that the stadium, seating 20,000, could be filled, considering that the 8th Siyum HaShas in New York had attracted only 5,000. But Agudath Israel of America went ahead and paid a nonrefundable deposit two and a half years in advance of the Siyum, and attendance met all expectations, with over 20,000 in attendance. Tickets on the main floor, priced at $100 apiece, were sold out for weeks in advance, and the women's section was also sold out. Other Siyums were held in Baltimore, Chicago, Cleveland, Los Angeles, Toronto, Montreal, and Tel Aviv.

Enormous crowds were seen at the 9th Siyum HaShas in Israel's main cities on 24 April 1990 (29 Nisan 5750). These included a Siyum in Tel Aviv at the Yad Eliyahu Arena, a Siyum in Jerusalem in the spacious Bais Yaakov High School courtyard, and a Siyum in Bnei Brak. Special children's Siyums were also held in Jerusalem (with students from 84 Talmud Torahs and schools in attendance) and in Bnei Brak (with 5,000 children together with leading rabbis and educators in attendance).

The 9th Siyum HaShas in London drew a large audience and lasted six hours, followed by a festive meal. Smaller events took place in Manchester, Gateshead, and among local Daf Yomi groups in England. In Melbourne, Australia, home to eight regular Daf Yomi shiurim, the central Siyum HaShas drew 1,000 people.

=== 10th Siyum HaShas ===
The 10th Siyum HaShas in the United States took place on 28 September 1997 at two New York City locations: Madison Square Garden, with an audience of 25,000, and the Nassau Coliseum, with an audience of 20,000. Siyums were also held in Boston, Cleveland, Chicago, Los Angeles, Pittsburgh, and Portland, bringing total U.S. participation to 70,000 individuals. Siyums also took place in Toronto, Ontario and Montreal, Quebec in Canada, and Melbourne, Australia.

In Israel, the central Siyum HaShas was held at Tel Aviv's Yad Eliyahu Arena on 28 September 1997 (26 Elul 5757) with thousands in attendance, and was broadcast live to other locations. The honor of starting the new cycle of Daf Yomi went to Rabbi Shmuel Wosner, a student of Rabbi Meir Shapiro, who shared his memories of the first Siyum HaShas in 1931. The Shabbat preceding this Siyum was billed as "Shabbos Daf Yomi", with rabbis calling on Israelis to increase their study of Daf Yomi. Other Siyums were held in battei medrash (study halls) in Jerusalem and Bnei Brak, and in Ramat Vizhnitz in Haifa.

In England, the central Siyum HaShas was held in the Sobel Center in London, drawing thousands of attendees. Over 2,500 attended the seudat mitzvah (celebratory meal) hosted by Agudath Israel in London. Another thousand attended Siyums in Manchester and Gateshead.

=== 11th Siyum HaShas ===
An estimated 300,000 people worldwide participated in the 11th Siyum HaShas. The largest celebrations were held on 1 March 2005 in three locations in the New York area: Madison Square Garden, the Continental Airlines Arena in New Jersey, and the Jacob K. Javits Convention Center, with a combined 45,000 attendees. Portions of each program were telecast to the other sites and to more than 50 locations countrywide, including the Rosemont Theatre in Chicago, the Walt Disney Concert Hall in Los Angeles, and the Ricoh Coliseum in Toronto. The programs were also broadcast to 20 overseas locations. The honor of reciting the final portion of the final page at the Continental Arena event was given to Rabbi Chaim Stein, rosh yeshiva of the Telshe yeshiva of Wickliffe, Ohio, who was making his ninth personal Siyum HaShas and had participated in each of the ten preceding events, including the first one held at the Chachmei Lublin Yeshiva in 1931.

In Israel, 10,000 tickets prepared for the central Siyum HaShas at Yad Eliyahu Arena in Tel Aviv on 1 March 2005 (20 Adar I, 5765) sold out immediately. The proceedings were viewed by live satellite hookup in Jerusalem, Bnei Brak, and Ashdod. Siyums were also held in Jerusalem at the International Convention Center, in the Zikhron Moshe synagogue, in the Pinsk-Karlin beis medrash, in Kiryat Belz, and at the Erlau yeshiva. An English-language Siyum at the Jerusalem Convention Center was attended by the Rebbes of Boyan, Karlin-Stolin, Kaliv, and Pittsburg, as well as by English-speaking roshei yeshiva Rabbi Nosson Tzvi Finkel, Rabbi Chaim Pinchas Scheinberg, Rabbi Yitzchak Sheiner, and Rabbi Mendel Weinbach. Other Siyums were held in Bnei Brak, Haifa, Ashdod, Netanya, Petah Tikva, Rehovot, Tel Zion, and Kiryat Ata.

The 11th Siyum HaShas was also celebrated by 4,000 people in London, 2,000 people in Manchester, and at events in Antwerp, and Melbourne and Sydney, Australia. The scope of celebrations marking the 11th Siyum HaShas was described in one newspaper account as follows:

Among the [U.S.] cities where Siyums were held were Atlanta, Baltimore, Boston, Dallas, Detroit, Des Moines, Denver, Houston, Los Angeles, Lakewood, Miami, Milwaukee, New Orleans, St. Louis, Seattle, Cincinnati, Scranton, Pittsburgh, Philadelphia, Cleveland, and Chicago.

Siyums were also held in Toronto, Ontario, Canada; Buenos Aires, Argentina; Caracas, Venezuela; Sao Paulo, Brazil; Santiago, Chile; Johannesburg, South Africa; Lublin, Poland, Moscow, St. Petersburg, Kyiv, and Odessa in the Former Soviet Union; Hong Kong, China; and Sydney, Australia.

Coming as it did the day before the yahrzeit of Hasidic master Reb Elimelech of Lizensk, when hundreds traditionally make a pilgrimage to his grave in Leżajsk, Poland, two Siyums were celebrated in Poland, including the first at the Chachmei Lublin Yeshiva since 1931 (see below). A large group from Israel traveled to the former beis medrash of the Gerrer Rebbes in Góra Kalwaria. A Siyum HaShas was made in Moscow by the united Jewish communities in Russia under the leadership of Chief Rabbi Berel Lazar.

The 11th Siyum HaShas was also marked by an event for non-Orthodox Jews called Jewish Unity Live 2005. The central venue, the New Jersey Performing Arts Center, featured Elie Wiesel, U.S. Senator Joseph Lieberman, and other celebrities; gatherings were also held on college campuses and military bases across the U.S.

=== 12th Siyum HaShas ===
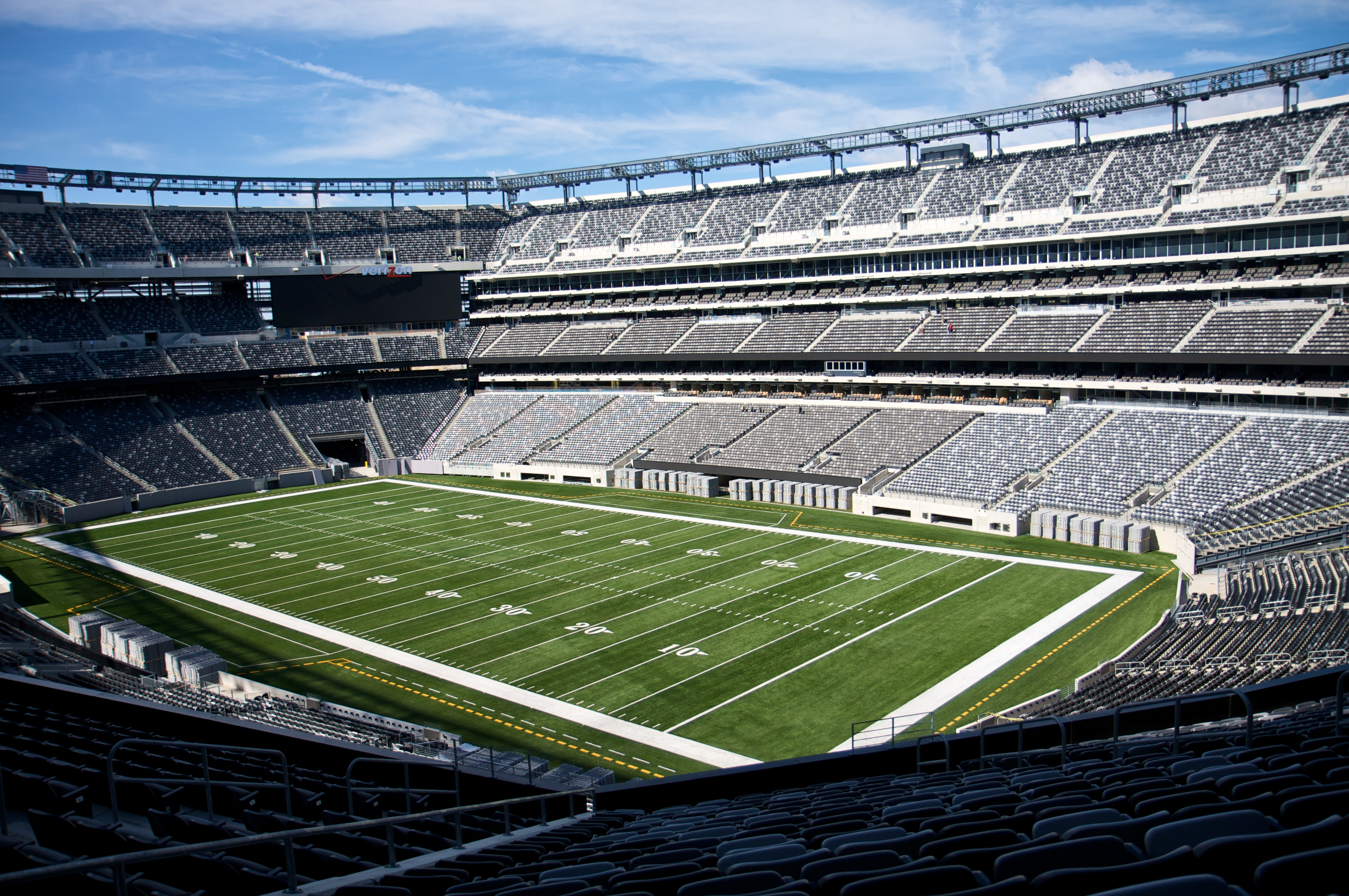
MetLife Stadium, site of the 12th and 13th Siyum HaShas

MetLife Stadium in East Rutherford, New Jersey, which has seating for 82,500, was the main U.S. venue for the 12th Siyum HaShas on 1 August 2012. An additional 8,500 folding chairs were placed on the playing field, and a dais of approximately 500 seats accommodated Admorim, roshei yeshiva, and distinguished rabbis. An additional section of 1,000 seats was reserved for teachers of Daf Yomi shiurim. All 92,000 seats were sold out. A total of 2,200 plasma screens were set up inside the stadium and four Jumbotron screens were positioned outside the stadium for overflow attendees. Female attendees, who constituted an estimated 20 percent of the crowd, were seated in the upper deck of the stadium behind a 12-foot (3.7 m) high, 2.5-mile (4.0 km) long mechitza (curtain divider) that was drawn during prayers. Satellite broadcasts and web feeds were piped to over 100 locations, including those in Chicago, Baltimore, Toronto, Montreal, Los Angeles, Mexico City, Uruguay, Buenos Aires, Argentina, Melbourne, Hong Kong, and Lublin, Poland.

For the first time, a Modern Orthodox Siyum HaShas was also held, on 6 August 2012, at Congregation Shearith Israel on Manhattan's Upper West Side. This event featured lectures on various aspects of both the Jerusalem and the Babylonian Talmud, and participation by female Torah scholars.

Tens of thousands attended Siyums in Israel. These included the Dirshu World Siyum at the Yad Eliyahu Arena in Tel Aviv, the National Siyum HaShas in Petah Tikva, a Siyum organized by Agudath Israel and Degel HaTorah in the French Hill neighborhood of Jerusalem, and a Siyum organized by the Shas political party at Teddy Stadium in Jerusalem. There were two English-language Siyums at Jerusalem's International Convention Center, one sponsored by Dirshu on 31 July and one organized by Kollel Iyun Hadaf on 5 August. The various Religious Zionist organizations sponsored a separate siyum at the same Convention Center on 2 August, and there was another English language siyum at Jerusalem's Great Synagogue on 9 August.

A new edition of the Talmud was launched to coincide with the 12th Siyum HaShas by Koren Publishers. Known as the Koren Talmud Bavli, this edition features translation and commentary by Rabbi Adin Steinsaltz. The project, slated to be 42 volumes, is overseen by Rabbi Dr. Tzvi Hersh Weinreb who serves as editor-in-chief.

=== 13th Siyum HaShas ===
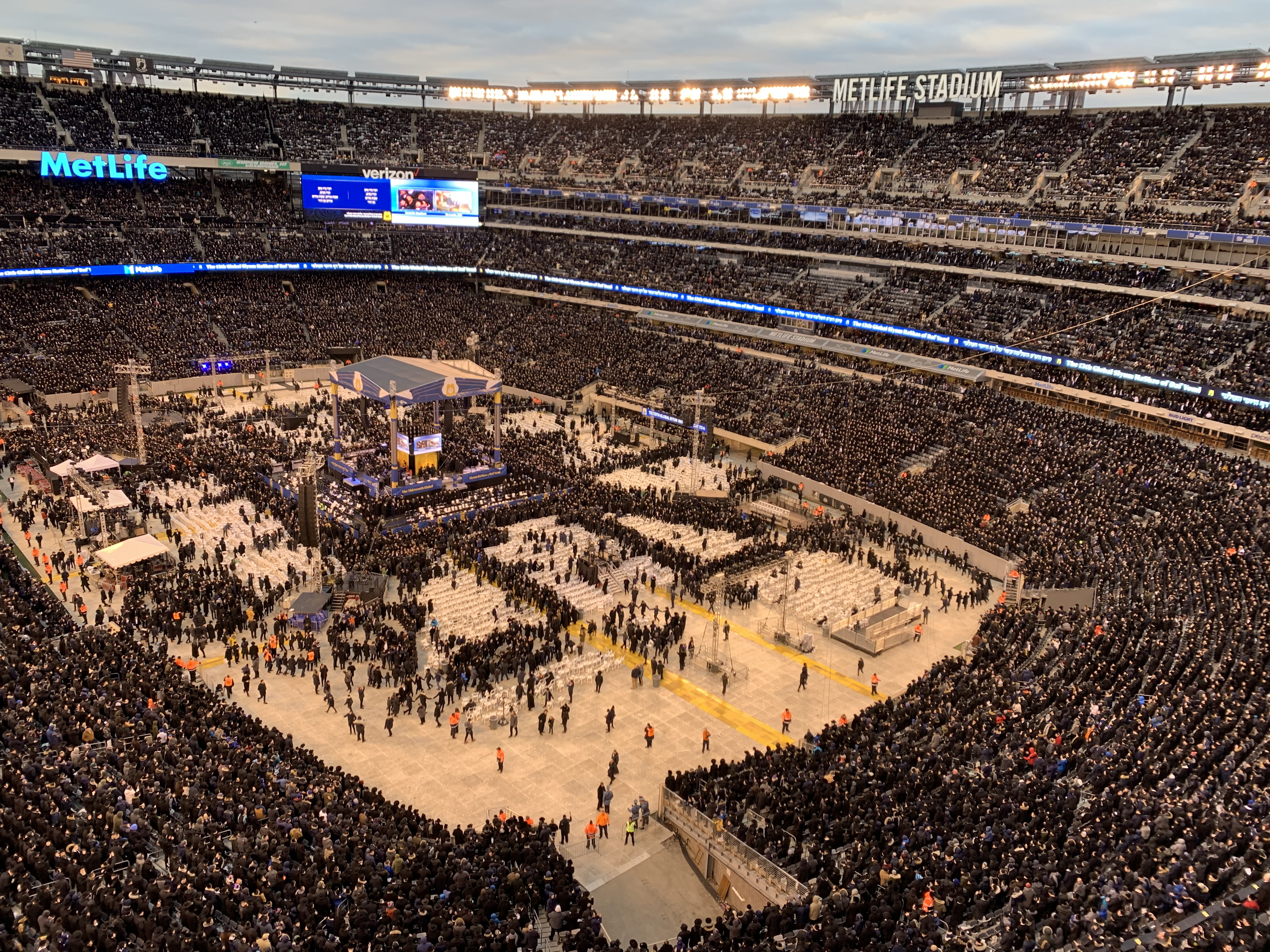
13th Siyum HaShas in MetLife Stadium.

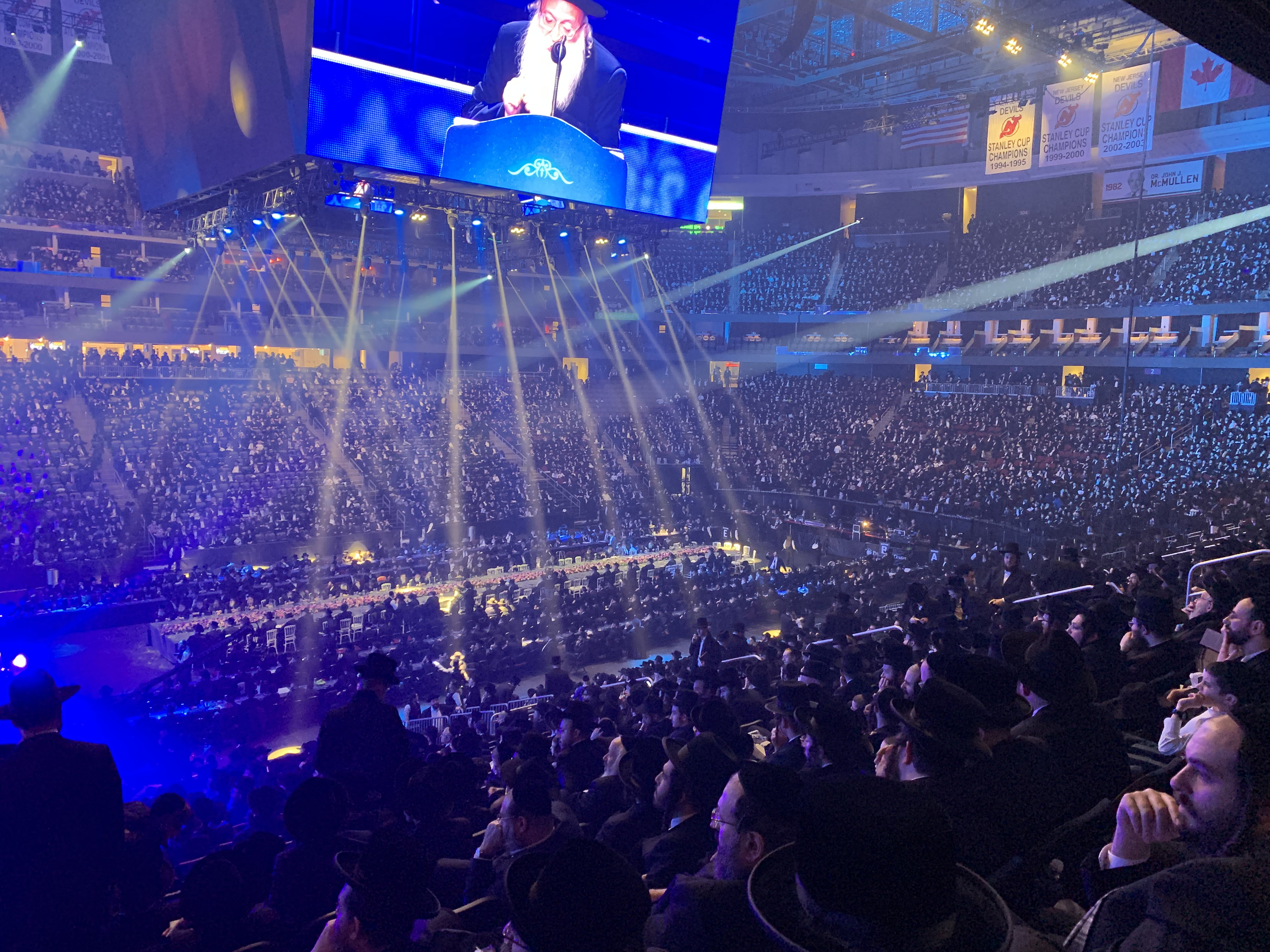
Dirshu Siyum HaShas on 9 February 2020, in the Prudential Center, Newark, New Jersey

For the 13th Siyum HaShas, whose study cycle concluded on the 7th of Tevet 5780 (4 January 2020), celebrations were scheduled to take place in locations in the U.S., Europe, Israel, and other countries, in January and February 2020. The main event in the United States, staged by Agudath Israel of America, took place on 1 January at MetLife Stadium, which has capacity for 92,000 seats, with a second location at Barclays Center in Brooklyn, New York. Concerned about holding an outdoor event during the New Jersey winter, planners had proposed holding the main siyum in five different indoor venues in New York, New Jersey, and Philadelphia simultaneously with live streaming hook-ups between them. But the Moetzes Gedolei HaTorah of Agudath Israel of America opted to hold the siyum in one place based on the principle of b'rov am hadrat melech, that God's honor is increased when a large number of Jews gather in the same place.

Early Siyum HaShas celebrations also took place in December 2019 in Melbourne and Vienna.

In Israel, the Hadran organization organized a Siyum HaShas celebration focusing on women's learning and teaching of Talmud in general and the Daf Yomi in particular.

Dirshu held their own Siyum in the Prudential Center in Newark, New Jersey on 9 February 2020.

The Siyum in the UK took place on 9 January at Wembley Arena, with an attendance of approximately 7,000.

=== 14th Siyum HaShas ===
The main 14th Siyum HaShas, organized by Agudath Israel of America, will take place on June 6, 2027, in MetLife Stadium.

== Return to Lublin ==
With the closure of the Chachmei Lublin Yeshiva by the Nazis and the conversion of the yeshiva to a medical academy, the Siyum HaShas was not held in its original venue for many cycles. In 1998 the yeshiva was returned to the Jewish community of Warsaw, which undertook renovations. In March 2005, Rabbi David Singer, an Orthodox Jew from Brooklyn, New York, whose father, Rabbi Joseph Singer, the Pilzno Rav, had been born in Poland, organized the 11th Siyum HaShas in the Chachmei Lublin Yeshiva. Chaired by Rabbi Baruch Taub, rabbi emeritus of Beth Avraham Yoseph of Toronto, the event was linked by satellite to the one in New York and was attended by over 200 participants, including the Rebbes of Sadigura, Modzhitz, Nadvorna, and Biala; Rabbi Yona Metzger, Chief Rabbi of Israel, and Israeli politician Rabbi Menachem Porush.

Singer organized the 12th Siyum HaShas at the Chachmei Lublin Yeshiva on 1 August 2012. Participants viewed a simultaneous broadcast from the event taking place that same day at the MetLife Stadium in New Jersey.

== Other uses ==
Siyum HaShas also refers to any individual's or group's completion of all 2,711 pages of Talmud. Many rabbis and Torah scholars have completed the study of the entire Talmud one or more times in their lifetimes. Synagogues, organizations, and community groups also complete the Talmud on a yearly basis, marking an annual Siyum HaShas. An initiative known as a Shas-A-Thon brings hundreds and even thousands of participants together to study and complete the entire Talmud in one day. This initiative is sometimes used as a fund-raiser, with participants collecting pledges from donors.

== See also ==
- List of masechtot, chapters, mishnahs and pages in the Talmud
- Talmud
- Agudath Israel of America
