= Daf Yomi =

Jewish learning regimen

Daf Yomi (Hebrew: דף יומי, Daf Yomi, "page of the day" or "daily folio") is a daily regimen of learning the Oral Torah and its commentaries (also known as the Gemara), in which each of the 2,711 pages of the Babylonian Talmud is covered in sequence. A daf, or blatt in Yiddish, consists of both sides of the page. Under this regimen, the entire Talmud is completed, one day at a time, in a cycle of approximately seven and a half years.

Tens of thousands of Jews worldwide study in the Daf Yomi program, and over 300,000 participate in the Siyum HaShas, an event celebrating the culmination of the cycle of learning. The Daf Yomi program has been credited with making Talmud study accessible to Jews who are not Torah scholars, contributing to Jewish continuity after the Holocaust, and having a unifying factor among Jews. Each day of the daily calendar, including Tisha B'Av, is included, and online audio versions of lectures are available.

== Origin ==
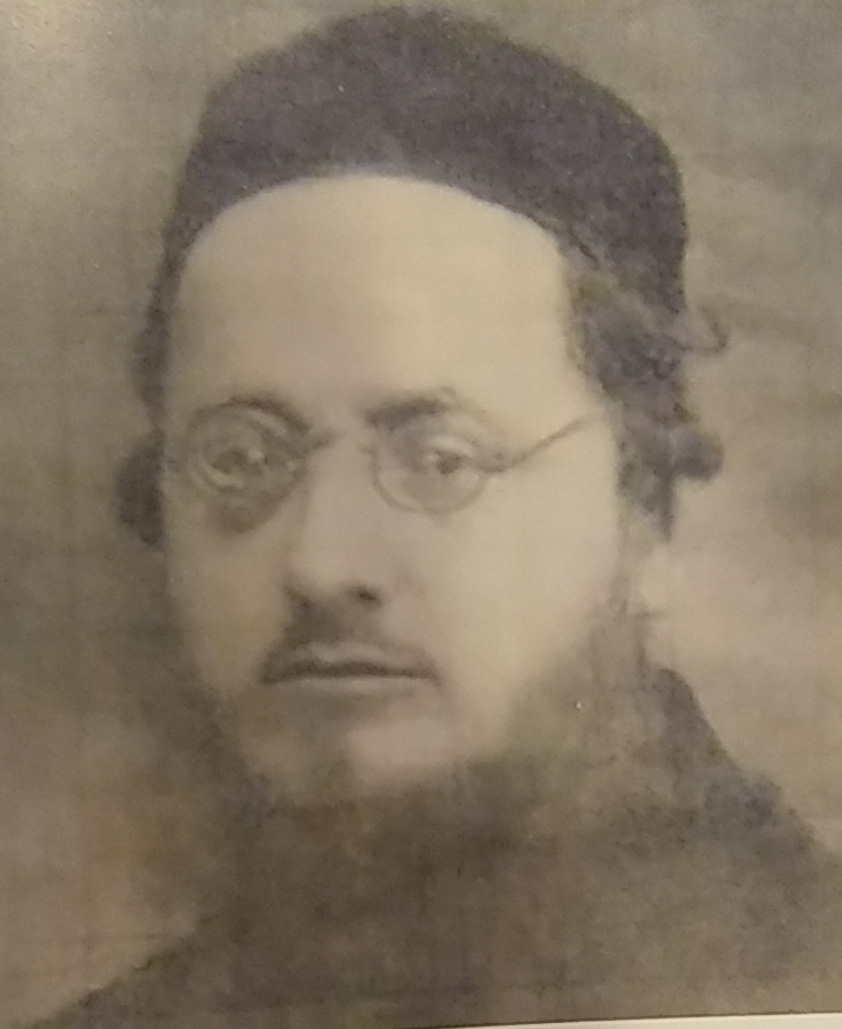
Moshe Menachem Mendel Spivak

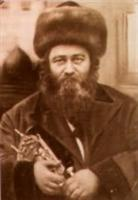
Meir Shapiro, initiator of Daf Yomi

The novel idea of Jews in all parts of the world studying the same daf each day, with the goal of completing the entire Talmud, was first proposed in a World Agudath Israel publication in December 1920 (Kislev 5681) Digleinu, the voice of Zeirei Agudath Israel, by Rabbi Moshe Menachem Mendel Spivak, and was put forth at the First World Congress of Agudath Israel which took place in Vienna starting from Elul 3, 5683 / August 15, 1923 and which lasted for ten days. The proposal for the study of Daf Hayomi was made on Elul 7 or 9, 5683 (August 19 or 21, 1923) by Meir Shapiro, then rabbi of Sanok, Poland, and future rosh yeshiva of Yeshivas Chachmei Lublin and the resolution was adopted on Elul 10, 5683. In those years, only some of the 63 tractates of the Talmud were being studied regularly, such as Berachot, Shabbat, and Eruvin, which deal with practical laws, while others, such as Zevachim and Temurah, were hardly studied. Shapiro also viewed the program as a way to unify the Jewish people. As he explained to the Congress delegates:

What a great thing! A Jew travels by boat and takes gemara Berachot under his arm. He travels for 15 days from Eretz Yisrael to America, and each day he learns the daf. When he arrives in America, he enters a beis medrash in New York and finds Jews learning the very same daf that he studied on that day, and he gladly joins them. Another Jew leaves the States and travels to Brazil or Japan, and he first goes to the beis medrash, where he finds everyone learning the same daf that he himself learned that day. Could there be greater unity of hearts than this?

Originally, Shapiro saw Daf Yomi as an obligation only for the religious youth of Poland. However, the idea was greeted enthusiastically by the nearly 600 delegates at the Congress, including many Torah leaders from Europe and America, who accepted it as a universal obligation for all Jews.

The first cycle of Daf Yomi commenced on the first day of Rosh Hashanah 5684 (11 September 1923), with tens of thousands of Jews in Europe, America and Israel learning the first daf of the first tractate of the Talmud, Berachot. To show support for the idea, the Gerrer rebbe, Avraham Mordechai Alter, learned the first daf of Berachot in public on that day. On 12 November 1923 Tractate Berachot was completed, with small siyums (celebrations marking the completion of study of a Talmudic tractate) in local communities. At that time, Shapiro published a calendar for the entire cycle of Daf Yomi study. (For the first seven cycles, there were 2,702 pages of Talmud on the schedule; starting in 1975, the Daf Yomi Commission of Agudath Israel increased it to 2,711, changing the edition used for Tractate Shekalim, taken from the Jerusalem Talmud, to one with more pages. The siyum for the completion of Tractate Pesachim took place after the laying of the cornerstone for Yeshivas Chachmei Lublin. At that time, Shapiro conceived the idea of contributing daily groschen to help raise money for the building. Each day, each person who studied Daf Yomi was asked to set aside a grosh (a Polish penny), and at the end of the tractate, to donate the sum to the yeshiva.

The Second World Congress of the World Agudath Israel, held in 1929, coincided with the completion of Tractate Zevachim.

The 1st Siyum HaShas took place on 2 February 1931 (15 Shevat 5691) in several cities in Europe and in Jerusalem, with the main venue being the newly opened Yeshivas Chachmei Lublin in Lublin, Poland. Tens of thousands of Jews attended these events. Shapiro presided over the Siyum in his yeshiva in the presence of many leaders of Polish Jewry. In the United States, Siyums were held in Baltimore and Philadelphia.

== Siyum HaShas ==
The completion of the Daf Yomi cycle is celebrated in an event known as the Siyum HaShas ("completion of the Shas"). In America, the main Siyum HaShas is organized by the Agudath Israel of America. Attendance at each successive recent Siyum HaShas has grown. In 1997 the 10th Siyum HaShas was celebrated by some 70,000 participants in the U.S.; at the 11th Siyum HaShas in 2005, participation had grown to 120,000 in the U.S. and 300,000 around the world.

The 12th Siyum HaShas in America was held on August 1, 2012, at the MetLife Stadium at the Meadowlands Sports Complex in New Jersey, which has capacity for over 90,000 attendees. All seats were sold out. Satellite broadcasts were piped to many other locations, including Yeshivas Chachmei Lublin in Poland. Tens of thousands attended celebrations in Israel.

The 13th Siyum HaShas on January 1, 2020, returned to MetLife Stadium, to a capacity crowd.

== Process ==
=== Process ===
With 2,711 pages in the Talmud, one Daf Yomi cycle takes about 7 years, 5 months. The completion of each tractate is typically celebrated with a small siyum, and the completion of the entire cycle is celebrated at an event known as the Siyum HaShas.

Daf Yomi can be studied alone, with a chavruta (study partner), in a daily shiur (class) led by a rabbi or teacher, via a telephone shiur, CD-ROM, or audio and online resources. Typically, Daf Yomi shiurim are held in synagogues, yeshivas, and offices. They also take place in the United States Senate, Wall Street board rooms, and on the Long Island Rail Road, in the last car of two commuter trains departing Far Rockaway at 7:51 am and 8:15 am, respectively, for Manhattan. Daf Yomi shiurim are piped into the in-flight sound system of all El Al flights. A typical Daf Yomi shiur lasts one hour. Participants typically study the text with only the most basic commentary, that of Rashi, but some shiurim are more elaborate.

=== Learning resources ===
The Schottenstein Edition of the Babylonian Talmud, an English-language translation and interpretation published in 73 volumes between 1990 and 2004 by ArtScroll, has been credited with significantly increasing the number of English speakers participating in the Daf Yomi program. ArtScroll planned the publication of each tractate to coincide with its study in the Daf Yomi cycle, releasing the final volume to coincide with the 11th Siyum HaShas in 2005. The Schottenstein Talmud was also translated into Hebrew. ArtScroll released in 2012 a mobile app that contained the entire Babylonian Talmud.

The Koren Talmud Bavli by Koren Publishers offers the Vilna Daf along with a bilingual section (English-Aramaic) with color maps, images, and extensive historical, scientific, biographical, and linguistic notes by Rabbi Adin Steinsaltz. To facilitate comprehension and reading fluency, the Aramaic text and Rashi commentary feature punctuation and vowels, and the text is fully annotated. The Koren Talmud Bavli with Rabbi Steinsaltz's commentary has been credited with opening access to Talmud study for Jews of all backgrounds.

Online resources include audiotapes, online websites, and iPods preloaded with lectures covering every page of the Talmud.

Since spring 2019, Dr. Henry Abramson of Touro College has been posting brief videos describing the historical context of each daf as part of the Orthodox Union Daf Yomi Initiative.

Talmudic study by women has never been forbidden, but was discouraged. Modern technology has led to increased accessibility for women. For example, Rabbanit Michelle Cohen Farber, an Orthodox scholar, is the founder of Hadran and teaches Daf Yomi to women through a podcast in English and Hebrew.

== Influence ==
Soon after its introduction, Daf Yomi inspired the founding of other Yomi (Daily) study programs for key texts of Judaism. These include Mishnah Yomis (the daily study of Mishnah), Nach Yomi (the daily study of Nevi'im and Ketuvim), and Mussar Yomi (the daily study of Mussar literature). In 1980 Simcha Bunim Alter introduced Yerushalmi Yomi, a daily schedule for completing the entire Jerusalem Talmud. Dirshu introduced Mishnah Berurah Yomi, a daily learning plan which completes the entire work by Rabbi Yisrael Meir Kagan in seven years.

In 2018, Eli Stefansky founded the Mercaz Daf Yomi (MDY) in Ramat Beit Shemesh, from which he broadcasts daily lectures of the daf yomi. As of 2023, the daily lectures received between 16,000 and 18,000 viewers, making its the most popular shiur in the world. He spends an estimated 14 hours per day to prepare for his lectures.

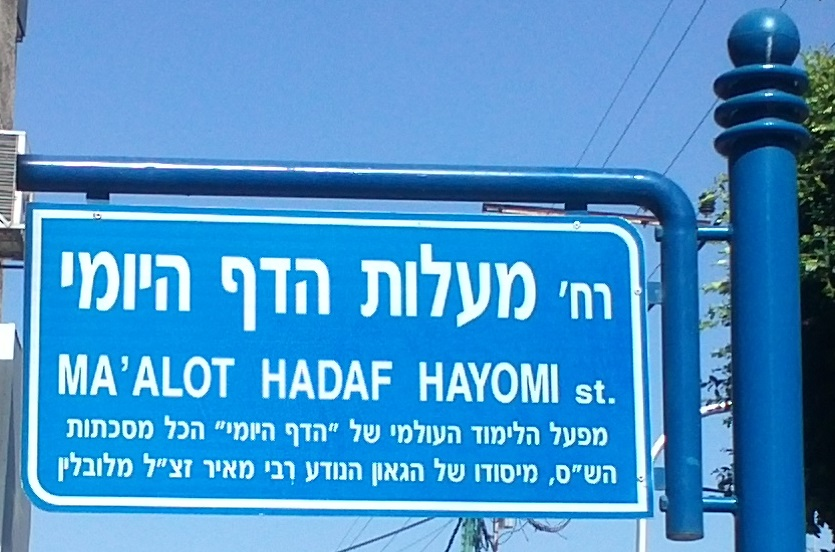
Hadaf Hayomi street in Bnei Brak

== See also ==
- Other study cycles under Torah study#Study cycles
- List of Talmudic tractates

== Sources ==
- Baumol, Yehoshua (1994). A Blaze in the Darkening Gloom: The life of Rav Meir Shapiro. Feldheim Publishers. ISBN 978-0-87306-675-4.
- Becher, Rabbi Mordechai (2005). Gateway to Judaism: The what, how, and why of Jewish life. Mesorah Publications Ltd. ISBN 9781422600306.
- Castle, Dovid (1996). Living with the Sages: Rashi and the Tosafists. Vol. 1. Feldheim Publishers. ISBN 9780873067621.
- Frand, Rabbi Yissocher (1999). Listen To Your Messages: And other observations on contemporary Jewish life. Mesorah Publications Ltd. ISBN 9781578191390.
- Goldman, Ari L. (2000). Being Jewish: The spiritual and cultural practice of Judaism today. Simon & Schuster. p. 264. ISBN 9780684823898. "tens of thousands."
- Heilman, Samuel C. (1995). "The Ninth Siyum HaShas: A case study in Orthodox contra-acculturation", in The Americanization of the Jews, New York University Press, ISBN 9780814780015.
- Holder, Meir (1986). History of the Jewish People: From Yavneh to Pumbedisa. Mesorah Publications Ltd. ISBN 9780899064994.
- Liberman Mintz, Sharon; Goldstein, Gabriel M. (2005). Printing the Talmud: From Bomberg to Schottenstein. Yeshiva University Museum. ISBN 9780945447160.
- Loewenthal, Naftali (2009). "The Image of Maimonides in Habad Hasidism". Traditions of Maimonideanism. Brill. ISBN 9789004173330.
- Meoros HaDaf HaYomi: A discussion of contemporary topics from Maseches Berachos. Feldheim Publishers. 2005. pp. vii–x. ISBN 978-1-58330-789-2.
- Scharfstein, Sol (1999). Understanding Jewish Holidays and Customs: Historical and Contemporary. KTAV Publishing House. ISBN 9780881256260.
- Schloss, Rabbi Chaim (2002). 2000 Years of Jewish History. Feldheim Publishers. ISBN 978-1-58330-214-9.
- Zakon, Nachman (2005). The Jewish experience: 2,000 years: A collection of significant events. Shaar Press. ISBN 9781578194964.
