= Giv'at Herzl =

Neighborhood in the southern part of Tel Aviv, Israel

Coordinates: 32°03′N 34°46′E

Givat Herzl גבעת הרצל
- Neighborhood of Tel Aviv
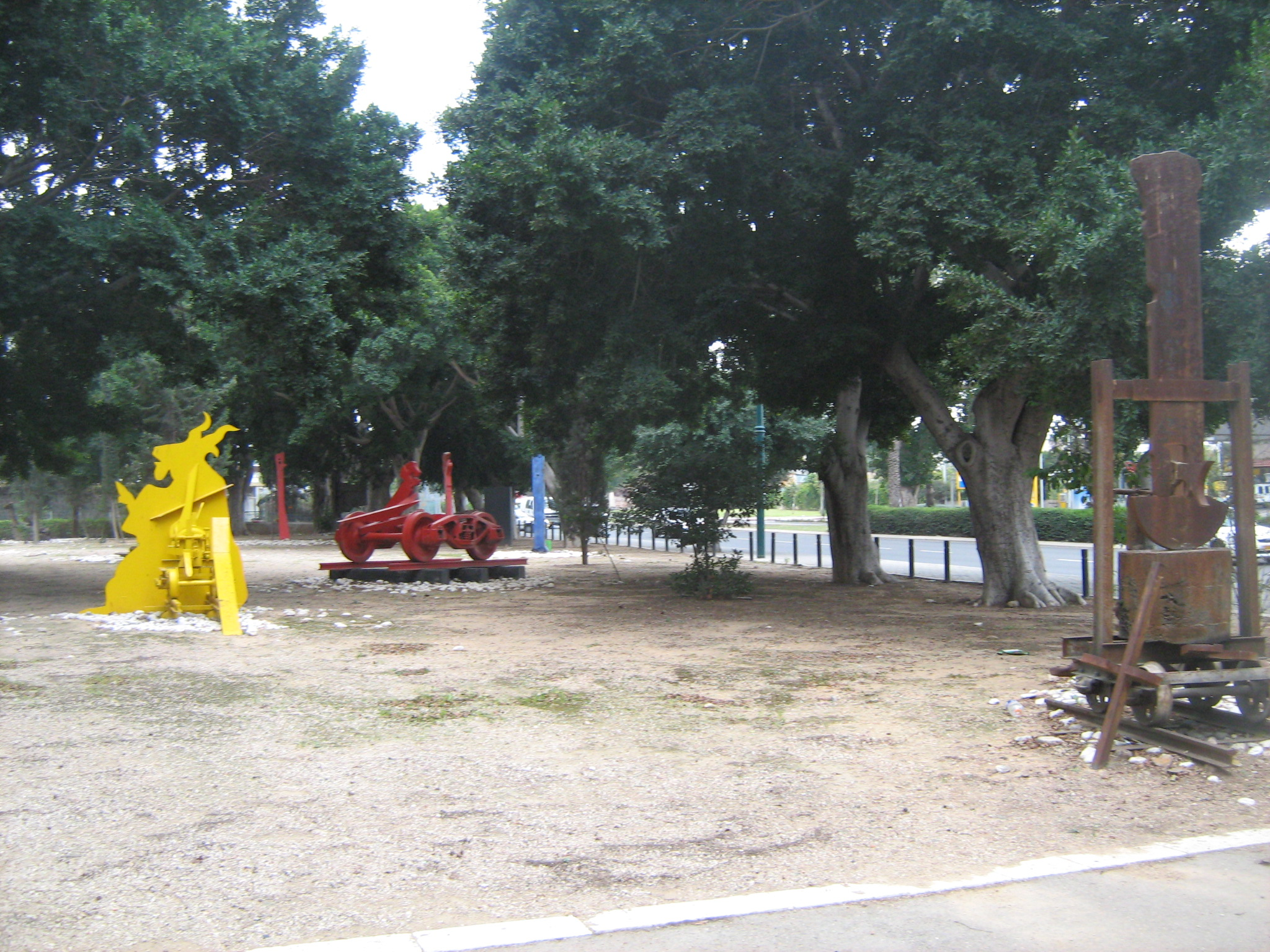
- Yigal Tumarkin statues in Abu Nabbut Park
- Interactive map of Givat Herzl
- Country: Israel
- City: Tel Aviv
- Established: 1930s

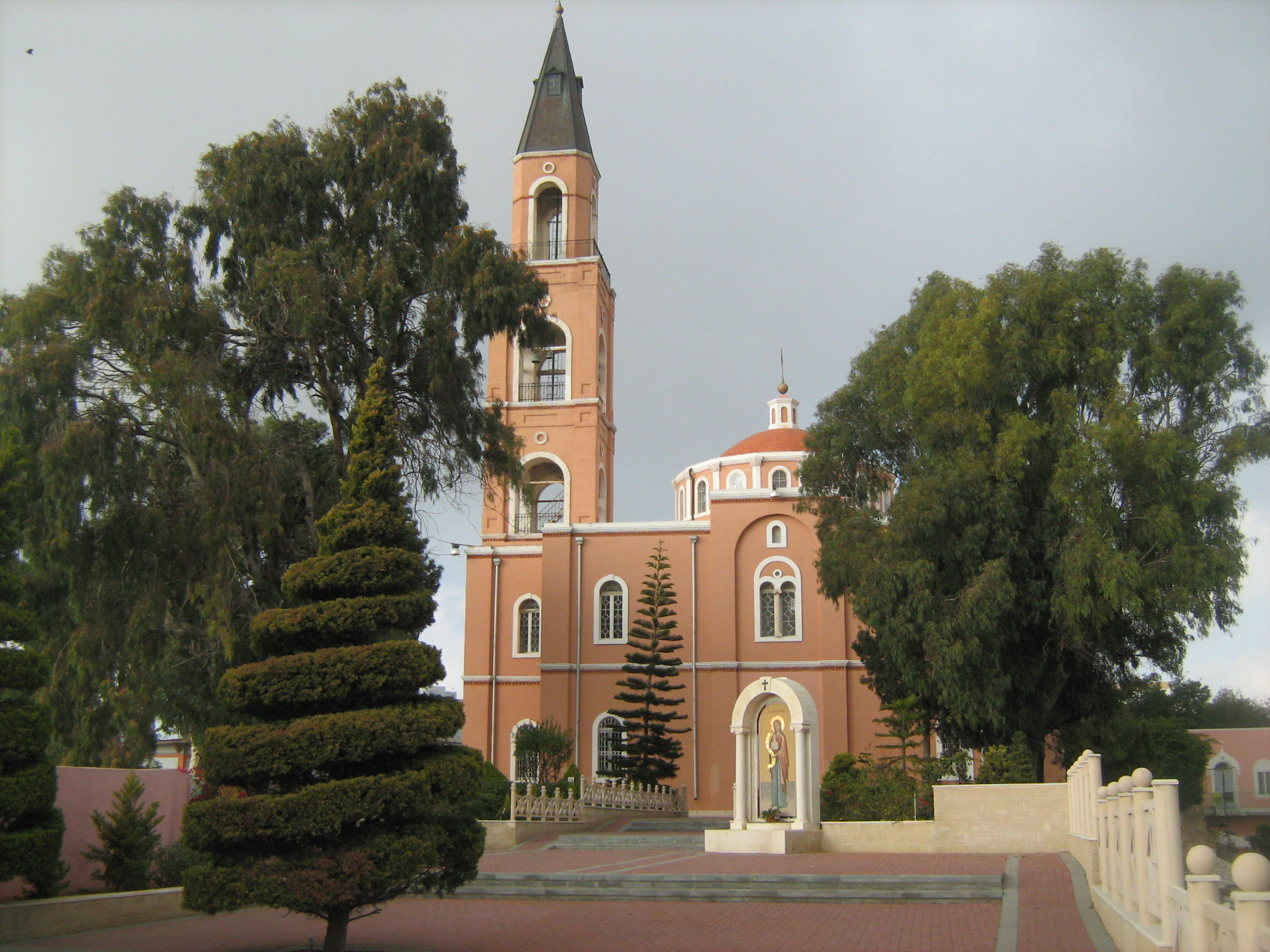
Church of Saint Peter

Givat Herzl (Hebrew: גבעת הרצל, lit. 'Herzl's hill') is a neighborhood located in the southern part of Tel Aviv, Israel.

It contains an ancient Jewish necropolis which was looted mainly during the late 19th and early 20th centuries.

== History ==
Givat Herzl was one of a number of rapidly expanding Jewish neighborhoods in the Jaffa municipality of Mandate Palestine that formed as satellites of Tel Aviv. After the 1936 Arab revolt, the residents of Givat Herzl demanded that they be annexed to the Tel Aviv municipality, stating that they were "like a foreign body in the Jaffa Municipality," and that geographically, ethnically, and organically," they were a natural continuation of Tel Aviv. A legal notice of auction in The Palestine Post for a Jewish-owned property in October 1939, lists the locality as ""Givat Herzl", Abu-Kabir Quarter, Jaffa" (quotes in original).

By 1947, Givat Herzl was a border neighborhood of Tel Aviv, also known as Shehunat Givat Herzl. A 1947 map shows Givat Herzl as being just to the north of Abu Kabir. Other reports from The Palestine Post between August and December 1947 indicate that Arab Abu Kabir and Jewish Givat Herzl lay side by side.

After four Jews and an Arab were killed in Gan-Havai by unknown perpetrators, tensions between the two communities increased. Roadblocks set up by the Hagana into Shehunat Givat Herzl and Shehunat Maccabi sections of Tel Aviv were stormed by an Arab mob on August 14, 1947. Three Jews were killed and 20 injured. Later that night, a Jewish truck driver carrying goods from Be'er Tuvia to Tel Aviv was killed at the Abu Kabir checkpoint.

== Landmarks ==
- School of Nature, Environment and Society - Elementary and junior high established in 1986.
- Botanical and Zoological parks, out of which the Tel Aviv University Zoological and Botanical departments grew
- Tel Aviv Detention Facility, also known as Abu Kabir Prison
- Sabil Abu Nabbut - Ottoman-era public fountain
- L. Greenberg Institute of Forensic Medicine - Only institution in Israel allowed to perform autopsies in cases of unnatural death.
- Russian Orthodox Church of Saint Peter - also known as "the Russian Church"
