= Abu Kabir =

Satellite village of Jaffa, mostly abandoned in 1948

Abu Kabir أبو كبير אבו כביר
- Depopulated village
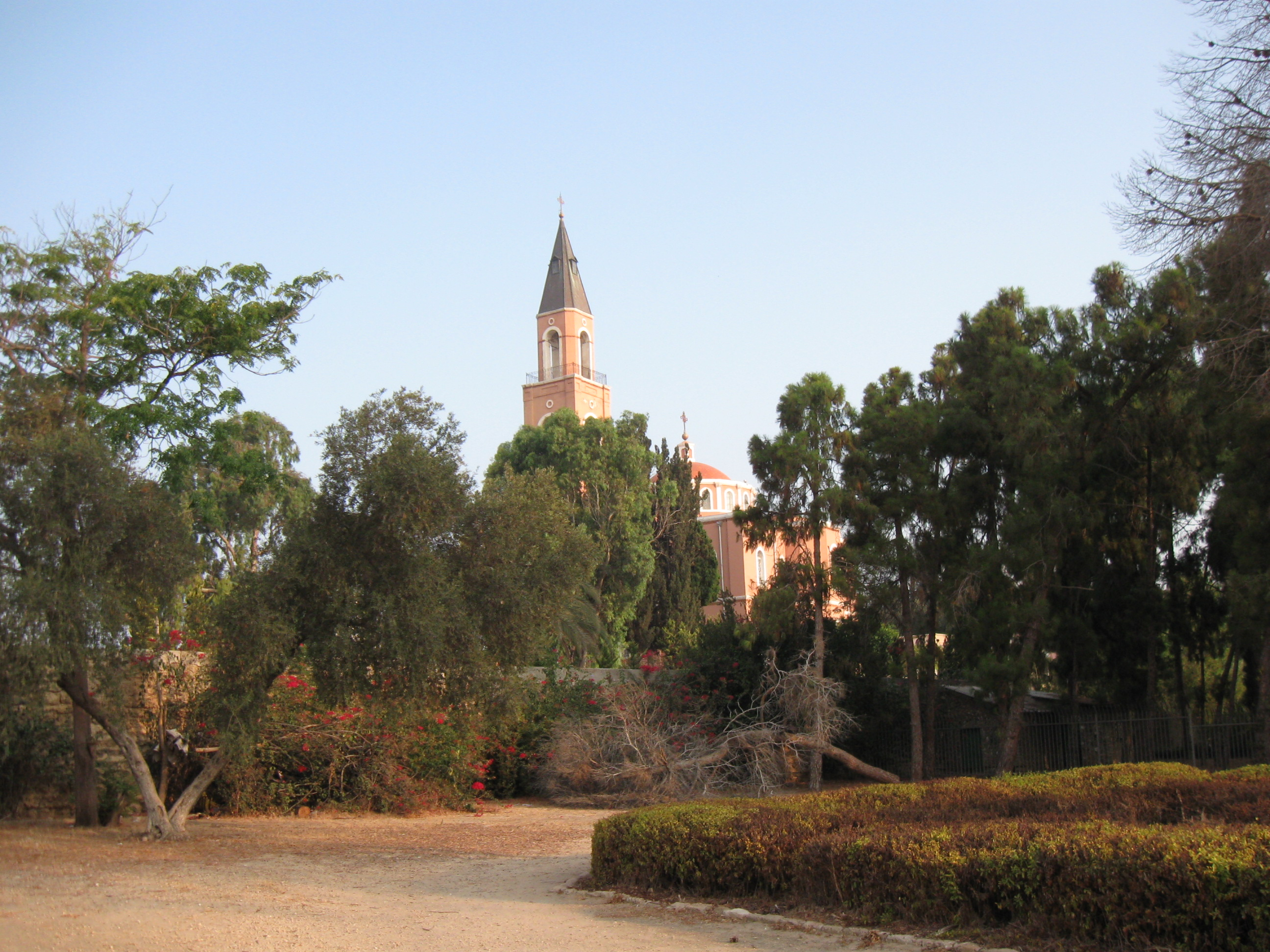
- Gardens in Abu Kabir
- Interactive map of Abu Kabir
- Country: Ottoman Empire, Mandatory Palestine
- Sanjak: Jerusalem
- Sub-district: Jaffa
- Established: 1830s
- Depopulated: 1948

Abu Kabir (Arabic: أبو كبير) was a satellite village of Jaffa founded by Egypt following Ibrahim Pasha's 1832 defeat of Turkish forces in Ottoman era Palestine. During the 1948 Palestine war, it was mostly abandoned and later destroyed. After Israel's establishment in 1948, the area became part of south Tel Aviv. Officially part of Giv'at Herzl (Hebrew: גבעת הרצל, lit. Herzl's hill), the adjacent Jewish neighborhood, the name Abu Kabir (Hebrew: אבו כביר) continued to be used.

== History ==
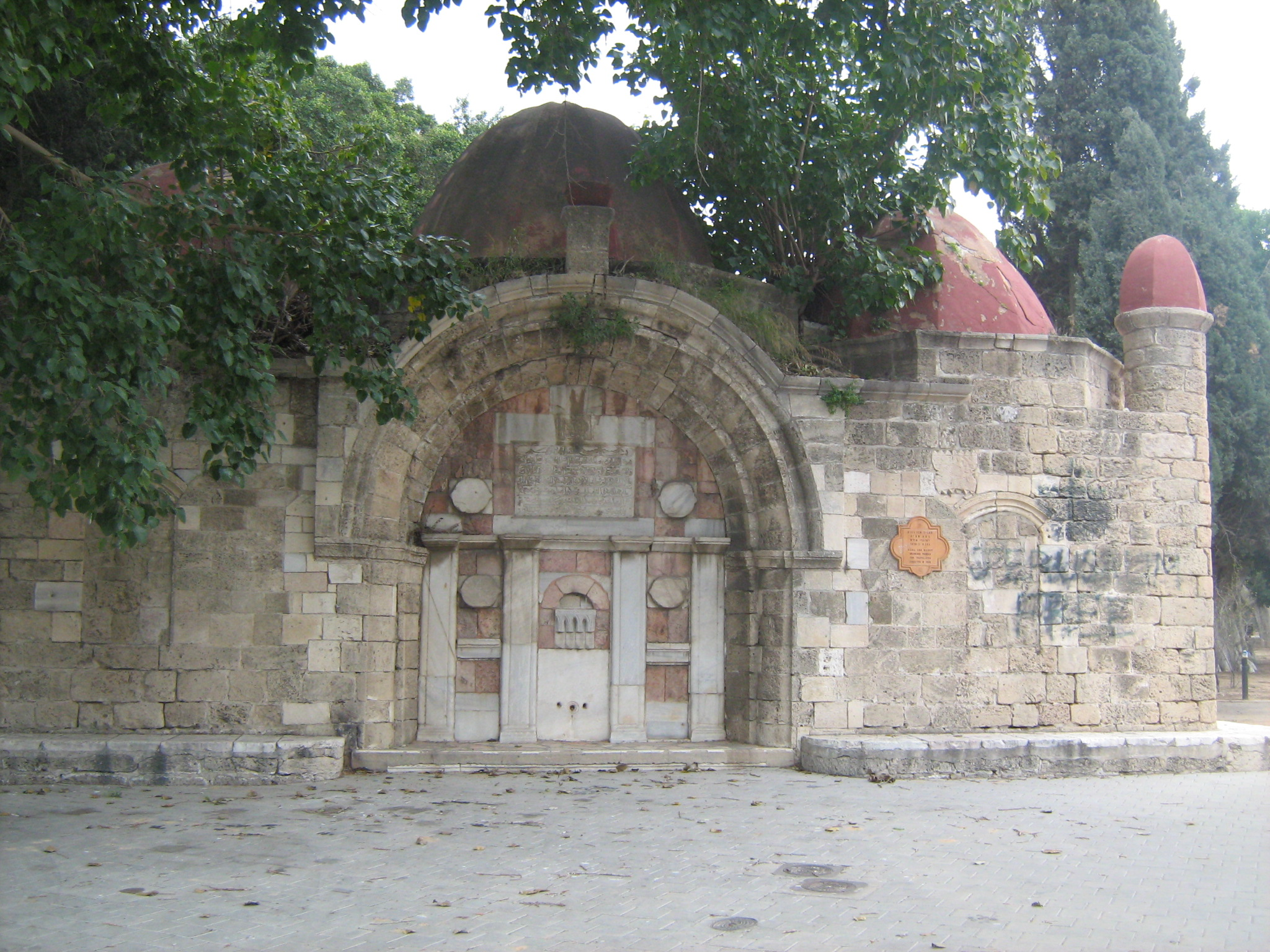
Sabil Abu Nabbut

=== Egyptian rule ===
The Egyptian army of Ibrahim Pasha captured the city of Jaffa and its environs following a battle with the forces of the Ottoman Empire in 1832. Though Egyptian rule over this area continued only until 1840, Egyptian Muslims settled in and around Jaffa, founding the village of Sakhanat Abu Kabir, along with Sakhanat al-Muzariyya, among others. An eastern suburb of Jaffa, many of the Egyptians who populated it came from the village of Tall al Kabir (or Tel Abu Kabir), and named it for their hometown.

=== Ottoman period ===
An Ottoman village list of about 1870 described Saknet Abu Kebir as a "Beduin camp", with 136 houses and a population of 440, though the population count included men only.

In The Survey of Western Palestine (1881), its name is recorded as Sâknet Abu Kebîr and it is translated as, "The settlement of Abu Kebir p.n.; (great father)." Charles Simon Clermont-Ganneau, the French archaeologist, visited in 1873–1874, searching for the site of the ancient Jewish cemetery of Joppa (Jaffa). He describes "Saknet Abu K'bir" as a hamlet, and relates walking through the "extensive gardens that close in Jaffa on every side" to reach it. He notes that during the heavy winter rains, the gardens between Jaffa and Saknet Abu Kabir became a small marshy lake that was known as al-Bassa by the locals. Noting that this name is commonly used throughout Syria for seasonal ponds of this nature and recalling that the biṣṣâ of the Hebrew Bible also means pond, he suggests that the similarity in the Arabic and Hebrew indicates a borrowing from even earlier linguistic traditions.

Under an entry entitled The Jewish necropolis of Joppa, Clermont-Ganneau relates that after inquiring with the local fellahin (peasants) in Abu Kabir, he was led "a few yards further on" from the hamlet, "in the middle of some poorly tilled gardens," where building stone was quarried by the villagers. Laid bare by their activities were, "sepulchral chambers hollowed out in the calcareous tufa." He notes that similar graves were said to found in the lands between Abu Kabir to as far as Mikveh Israel and the Catholic cemetery. Other fellahin told him of finds between Saknet Abu Kabir and Saknet al-'Abid, and still others told of artifacts that they had retrieved from them. One artifact was brought to him which he purchased: a small marble titulus with a four-line Greek inscription and a seven-branched candlestick (or menorah). Clermont-Ganneau identified this as Helleno-Jewish funeral epigraphy, ascribing it to Hezekiah, and writes that it, "settled once and for all the nature of the burial ground I had just discovered." In a letter published by the Palestine Exploration Fund, he expressed his hope to return noting, "We must at least find two or three more inscriptions of the same kind coming from the same neighbourhood." Locating the tombs within a circle called, "Ardh (or Jebel) Dhabitha," he notes the area extends over, "the great gardens outside Jaffa, bounded by a little hamlet called Abou K'bir* (Abu Kebir), and by the well of Aboa Nabbout (Abu Nabbut)."

The Jewish necropolis was looted mainly during the late 19th and early 20th centuries. Dating the site is a challenge due to the lack of objects found in situ, but estimates are that the tombs were used between the 3rd and 5th centuries AD. Most of the necropolis is now in the area of the Russian Orthodox Saint Peter's Church compound.

According to Mark LeVine, the Biluim pioneers set up a commune among the orange and lemon groves of the Abu Kabir neighborhood between 1882 and 1884. The house used by the commune members is now located in the Neve Ofer neighborhood of Tel Aviv.

=== British Mandate period ===
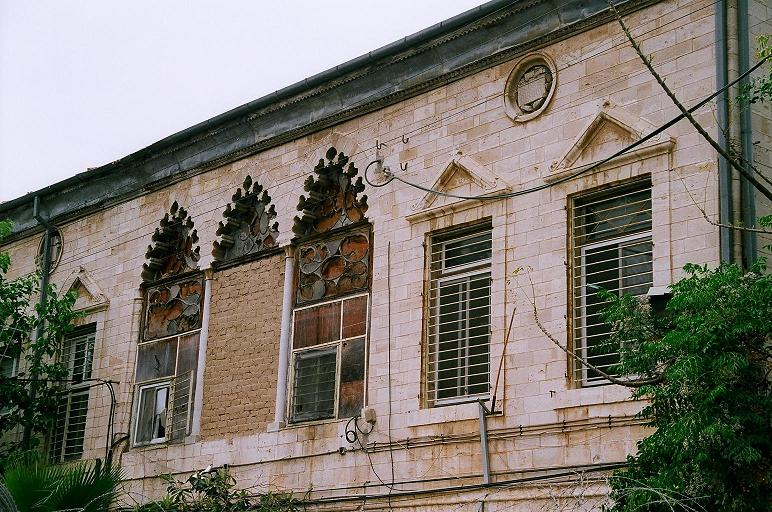
Historic Arab house in Abu Kabir

During the 1921 Jaffa riots, the violence reached Abu Kabir. The Jewish Yitzker family owned a dairy farm on the outskirts of the neighborhood, in which they rented out rooms. At the time of the riots, Yosef Haim Brenner, one of the pioneers of modern Hebrew literature was living at the site. On 2 May 1921, despite warnings Yitzker and Brenner refused to leave the farm and were murdered, along with Yitzker's teenaged son, his son-in-law and two other renters.

As Jaffa expanded during the 1920s and 1930s, Abu Kabir was incorporated within the municipal boundaries of Jaffa but retained much of its agricultural character. It consisted of a main built-up part bordering the Jewish sector of Jaffa from the south, and several small concentrations of houses within the surrounding citrus groves.

In the wake of violence on the border between Jaffa and Tel Aviv, Tel Aviv's leaders suggested annexing the Jewish neighborhoods of Jaffa to Tel Aviv. They proposed that the whole of Manshiyya, including Hassan Bey Mosque, as well as large parts of the Abu Kabir neighborhood, be transferred to the borders of the new Jewish city and state."

On 23 August 1944, the British Criminal Investigation Department (CID) barracks at Jaffa, and police stations at Abu Kabir and Neve Shaanan were raided for arms by the Irgun.

=== 1947–1948 war ===
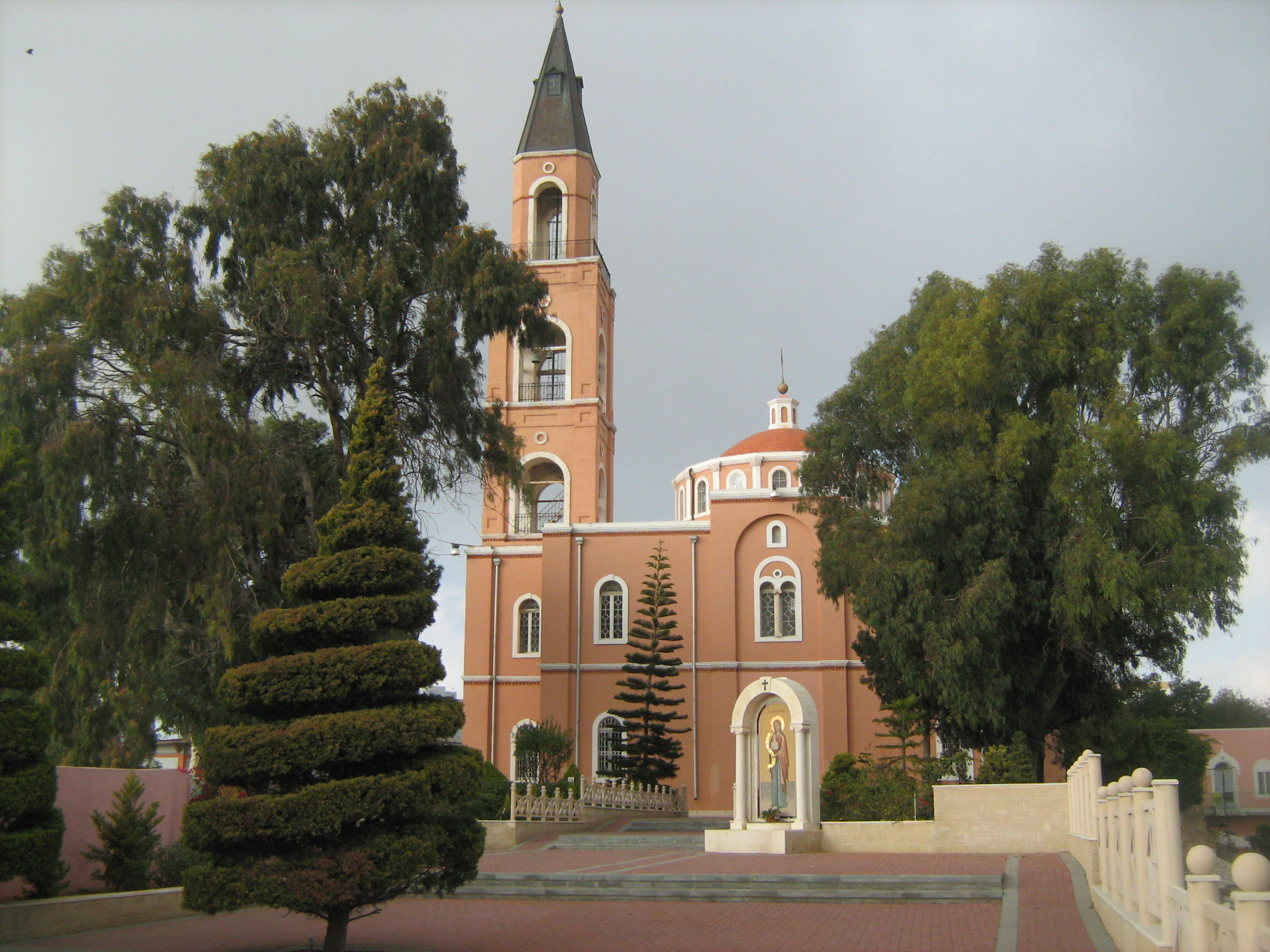
Church in Abu Kabir

In 1947, Abu Kabir was situated at the entrance to Tel Aviv on the main road to Jerusalem. On 30 November 1947, the day after the UN voted on the Partition Plan, an Arab mob in Abu Kabir attacked a car with Jewish passengers, killing all three. Jewish retaliatory strikes followed. On 2 December the Haganah's Kiryati Brigade blew up an Arab house in Abu Kabir, and the IZL torched several buildings four days later, killing at least two persons.

During Operation Lamed Hey (Hebrew for "35"), named for the 35 casualties of an attack on the Convoy of 35, Abu Kabir was raided to "cleanse it of the forces acting there." On the night of 12–13 February 1948, the Haganah struck simultaneously at Abu Kabir, Jibalia, Tel a-Rish and the village of Yazur. At Abu Kabir, 13 Arabs were killed, including the Mukhtar, and 22 injured.

According to the Palestine Post, on 16 February 1948 the Haganah repulsed an Arab attack on Tel Aviv from Abu Kabir.

A second major attack on Abu Kabir was launched on 13 March, the objective of which was, "the destruction of the Abu Kabir neighborhood". By this time the neighborhood was mostly abandoned by its inhabitants and was guarded by a few dozen militiamen. Sappers blew up a number of houses and this was the first attack in which Yishuv-produced Davidka mortars were used to shell the neighborhood. Inaccurate and very loud, the mortars had a demoralizing effect claimed to have reached "as far as Gaza".

A month after Abu Kabir was conquered, David Ben-Gurion told the Israeli Provisional Government that Jaffa's Arab population should not be allowed to return: "If there will be [an] Abu Kebir again - this would be impossible. The world needs to understand we are 700,000 against 27 million, one against forty ... It won't be acceptable to us for Abu Kebir to be Arab again."

Walid Khalidi writes that the Haganah completed the demolition of Abu Kabir by 31 March. On 19 April 1948, The Palestine Post reported that "In the Abu Kebir area, the Haganah dispersed Arabs who tried to erect an emplacement facing the Aka factory in Givat Herzl. Two Arabs were shot as they approached the Maccabi Quarter."

=== State of Israel ===
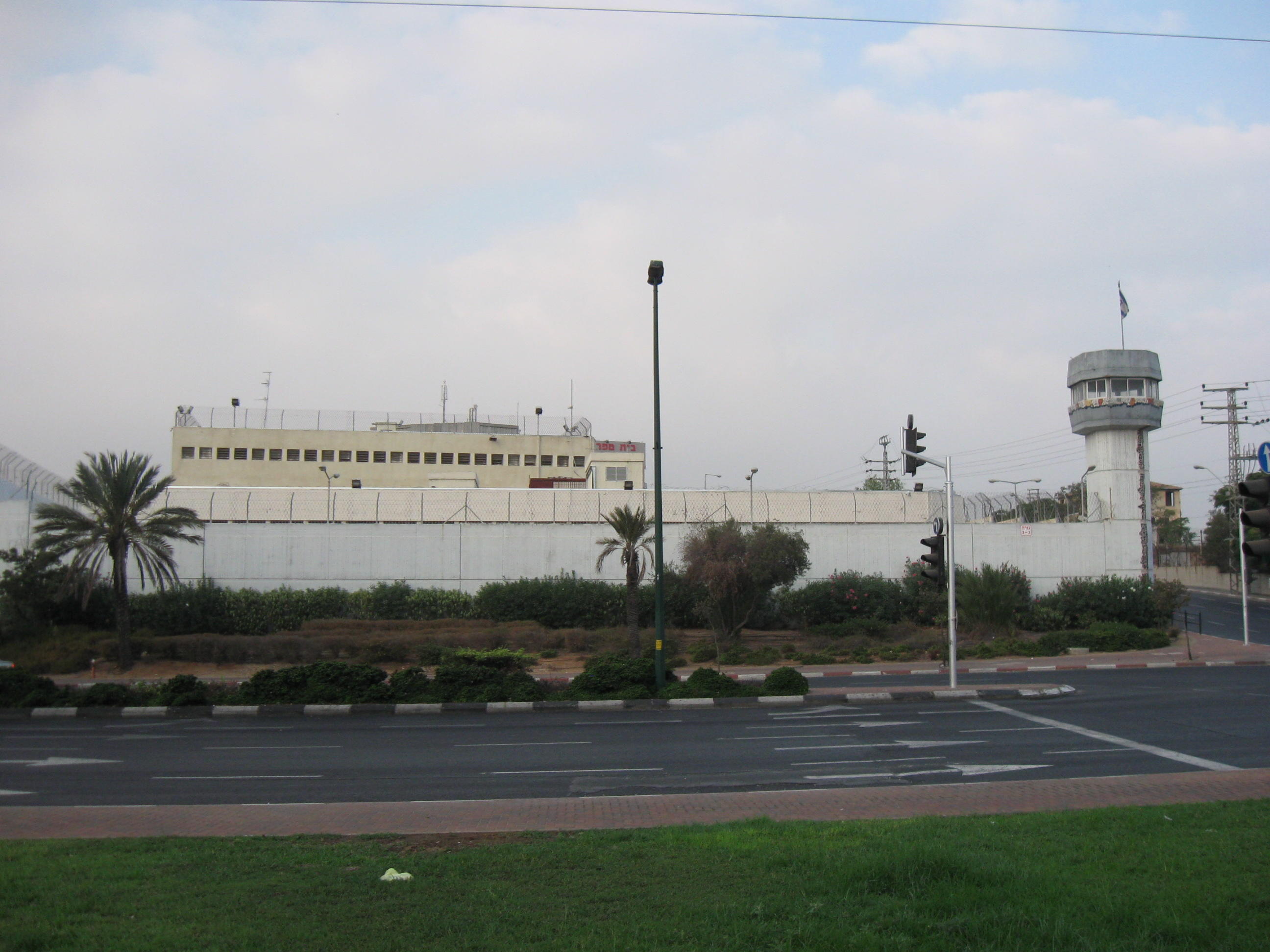
Abu Kabir detention center

The Arabic name, Abu Kabir, is still used by the now largely Hebrew-speaking population. The Tel Aviv Municipality offered Prof. Heinrich Mendelssohn, Director of the Biological-Pedagogical Institute, the option of moving the institute to Abu Kabir, and it was moved into a structure originally planned as a hospital. Haim Levanon, Deputy Mayor of Tel Aviv in the early 1950s and mayor from 1953 to 1959 energetically campaigned for the founding of a university in Tel Aviv. The idea was realized on 16 August 1953, when the Municipal Council of Tel Aviv-Yafo decided to transform the Biological-Pedagogical Institute into the Academic Institute of Natural Sciences, under the leadership of Prof. Mendelssohn, which would "form the core of a future university." The Abu Kabir campus in southern Tel Aviv had 24 students in its first year.

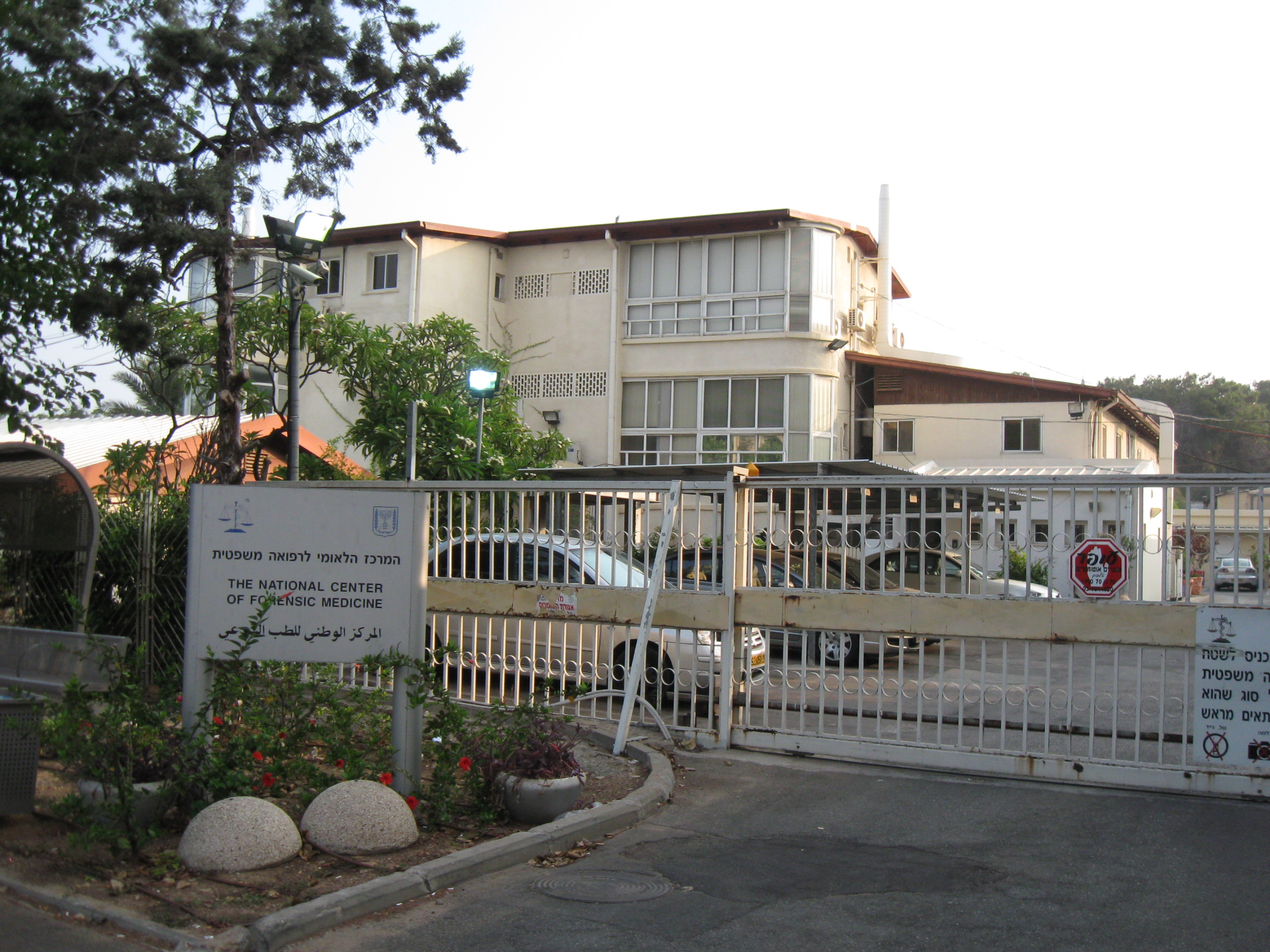
The Greenberg Institute of Forensic Medicine in Abu Kabir

In 1954, the Academic Institute of Jewish Studies was established in Abu Kabir. A university library was also founded, new study tracks were opened, a teaching staff was formed, laboratories and classrooms were built, and an administration established for the campus. The L. Greenberg Institute of Forensic Medicine, locally known as the Abu Kabir Forensic Institute, was established that year.

In 1956, the Academic Institutes were officially upgraded into the new "University of Tel Aviv". The Zoological Gardens became part of the university. The Zoological and Botanical Gardens were moved to the Ramat Aviv campus in 1981. The Nature Gardens still host the original facilities. The gardens at Abu Kabir are recommended in an Israeli guide to Tel Aviv as a destination for nature lovers. In the tour book Israel and the Palestinian territories (1998), "the former village of Abu Kabir" is described as being located in a green space to the east of Jaffa.

Salvage excavations were undertaken by Israeli archaeologists in the burial complex at "Saknat Abu Kabir" in 1991.

The Tel Aviv Detention Center, known as the Abu Kabir Prison is also in the area. The detention center was built in 1937 by the British authorities and was used originally served as a fort.

Israeli media reported in January 2011 that the part or all of the area in south Tel Aviv known as Abu Kabir, the hill or neighborhood, was given a new name, Tabitha, by the Tel Aviv municipality's naming committee.

== Literary references ==
In Ephraim Kishon's satirical short story, "The Economics of Babysitting" (1989), the main character, a male babysitter, speaks of the beauty of strolling through Tel Aviv at night, and one of the places he mentions as being especially beautiful, is the "Abu Kabir Plain."

== See also ==
- Abu Kabir Forensic Institute
