= Hayyim ben David Schwartz =

Hebrew printer, typographer and editor

Hayyim ben David Schwartz (German: Schwarz; Hebrew: חיים בן דוד שחור, Hayyim ben David Shahor; c. 1490 – 1549) was an early Hebrew printer, typographer, and editor, known as the first Jewish printer of Hebrew books in Germany.

== Origin and early work ==
Schwartz was born in Litoměřice (then called Leitmeritz in Bohemia, nowadays in the Czech Republic) in or around 1495, to David Schwarz, a copper engraver at the local guild.

Shahor means black in Hebrew, which is the meaning of Schwartz; Moritz Steinschneider informs us that his name was used as Schwartz.

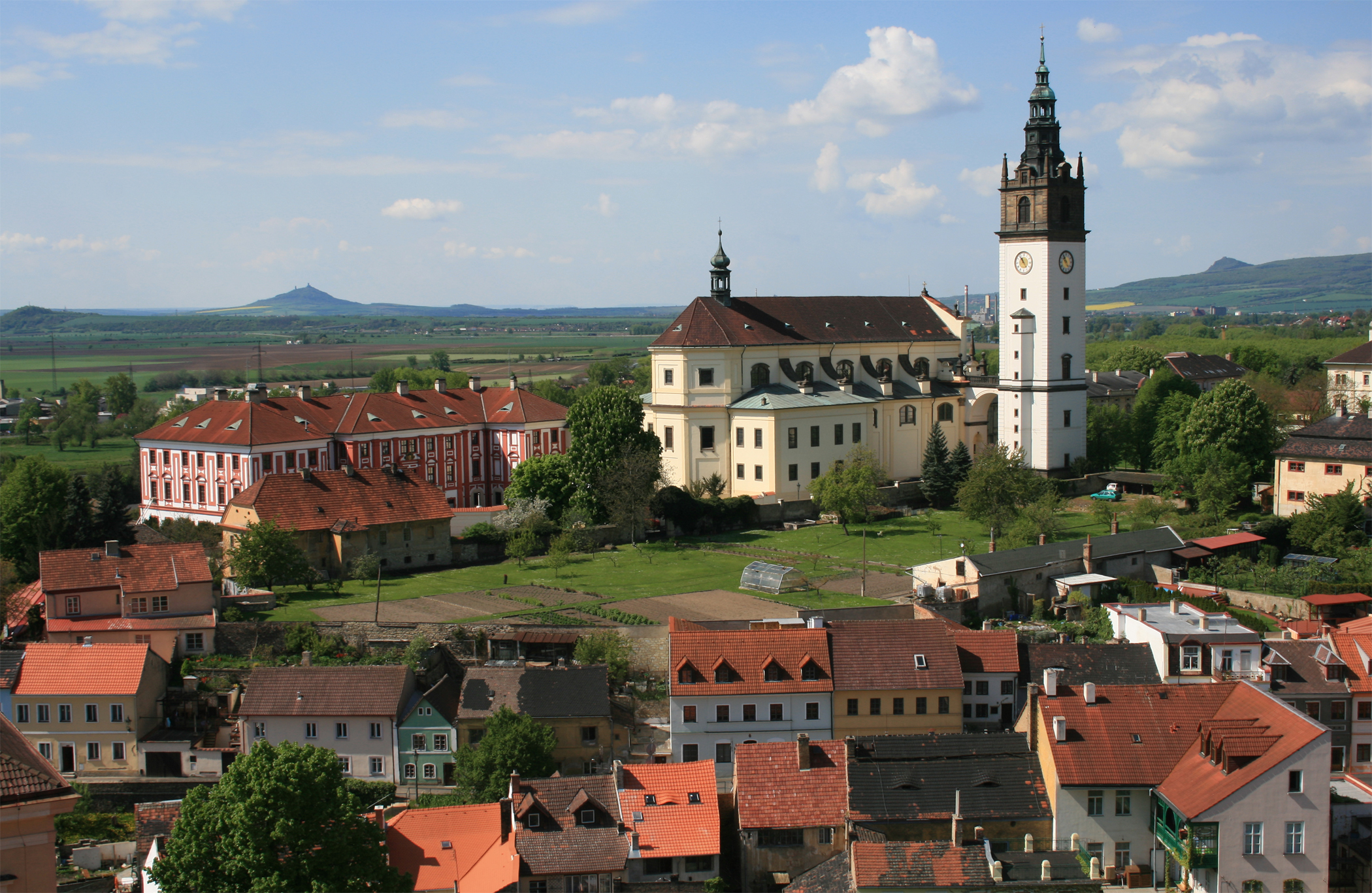
View on Litoměřice, possibly close to what Hayyim Schwartz experienced it at the beginning of the 16th century.

Schwartz's printing activities began in 1514, acting as a typesetter at the Prague printing press of Gershom Katz (printing an edition of Zemirot and Birkat Hamazon).

He is cited as an illustrator (engraver) and editor for a small number of subsequent Prague volumes, until the Hebrew Bible printed in 1526.

Schwartz's first print, a Hebrew Pentateuch, was printed in Oels in Silesia in 1530; this edition has been described as handsome and it is extremely rare today. Schwartz moved to Augsburg in 1533, missing a major storm in 1534, which destroyed the Jewish community, livelihoods, and plans for a successor to Schwartz at Hebrew printing.

== History of Hebrew Printing in Germany ==
Augsburg, bird's eye view, 1572.

In 1527, Schwartz obtained permission to print Hebrew books in the Kingdom of Bohemia from Ferdinand I, Holy Roman Emperor.

The first proper Hebrew text to be printed in Germany was apparently the 1518 Cologne Polyglot (the Johann Potken edition) which printed the Biblical text; Martin Luther, who attempted to create a program of imperial censorship in Germany, allowed the Hebrew Biblical text, though not rabbinical texts.

The Imperial Diets of certain cities in their joining of the Reichsabscheide allowed Jewish printing to continue as the Archdiocese of each municipality was deemed responsible for censorship (Augsburg was one of the earliest to join the Reichsabscheide in 1524 in response to Charles V, Holy Roman Emperor's condemnation of Luther) and it is in this setting that Schwartz began his career in Hebrew printing.

The first rabbinic books printed in Germany were printed in Augsburg; Portae Luscis (Sha'are Orah) by Joseph Gikatilla, printed by Johannes Müller with the eponymous woodcut illustration by Hans Burgkmair, and Darke Leshon ha-Kodesh of Moses Kimhi, by Johann Boschen, 1520.

In 1529, Petrus Schoffer's workshop, printed a number of rabbinic texts (all new translations by Sebastian Münster), including Maimonides' Thirteen Principles (Worms 1529).

== Augsburg (1529–1540/41) ==
While the Oels Pentateuch is considered to be the first Hebrew book printed in the German lands by a Jew (excluding Bohemia), Schwartz's most prominent seat of printing was the Hebrew press at Augsburg.

While Hebrew typography had been employed for German books prior to Schwartz (in editions of works by Petrus Niger, Martin Luther, Sebastian Münster, and Anton Margaritha), Schwartz's editions were the first proper Hebrew books (and certainly the first to be printed by a Jew) in the German lands. While there were rumors among bibliographers of sheets and quires printed by the Helicz Brothers in Silesia preceding Schwartz (including unsubstantiated rumors that they began printing Jacob ben Asher's Turim), Schwartz is still unsurpassed as the first true Hebrew printer in the German lands (Gershom Kohen founded the Prague press earlier, and the Helicz Brothers printed in Kraków).

While Augsburg was a free imperial city at the time, unconverted Jews were not allowed to take up permanent residence in the city during those times; Schwartz was therefore not a permanent resident, despite being a craftsman and a highly talented printer.

Schwartz printed in the print shop of Sylvan Otmar, and even lived in the home of Bonifacius Wohlfahrt, a censor who censored books printed by Schwartz. He may have even met with Konrad Peutinger, the great humanist, scholar, and collector, due to Peutinger's interests in Hebrew, Jewish interests, and other scholarly interests (Peutinger almost certainly knew Elia Levita, who had connections in the Bavarian universities and among scholars interested in Hebrew, and Levita would be the connection between Schwartz and Paul Fagius, Giles of Viterbo, Wolfgang Fabricius Capito, and we may speculate that he met Johann Reuchlin in his youth).

== The Augsburg Siddur ==
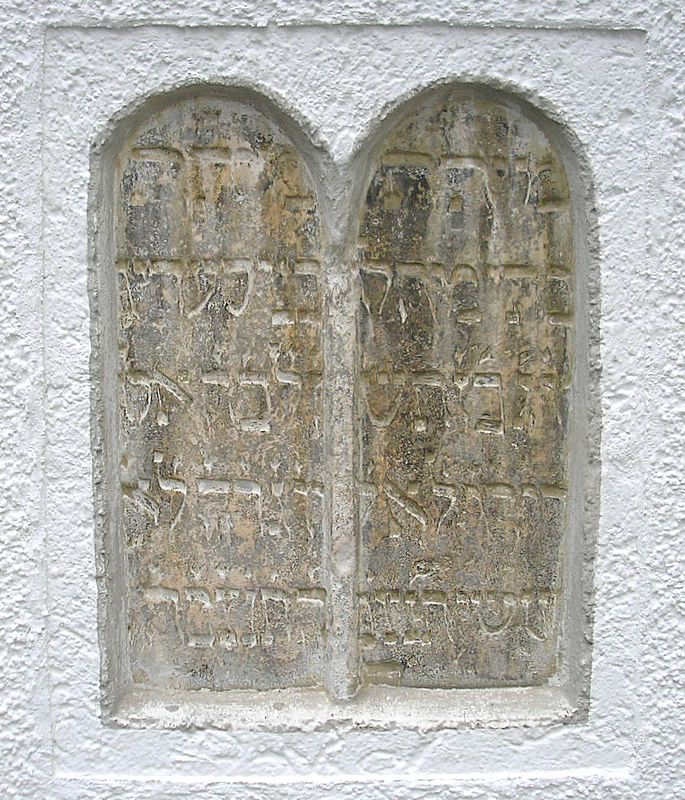
Late medieval Hebrew inscription in Augsburg (on the Peutingerhaus), likely which Schwartz saw

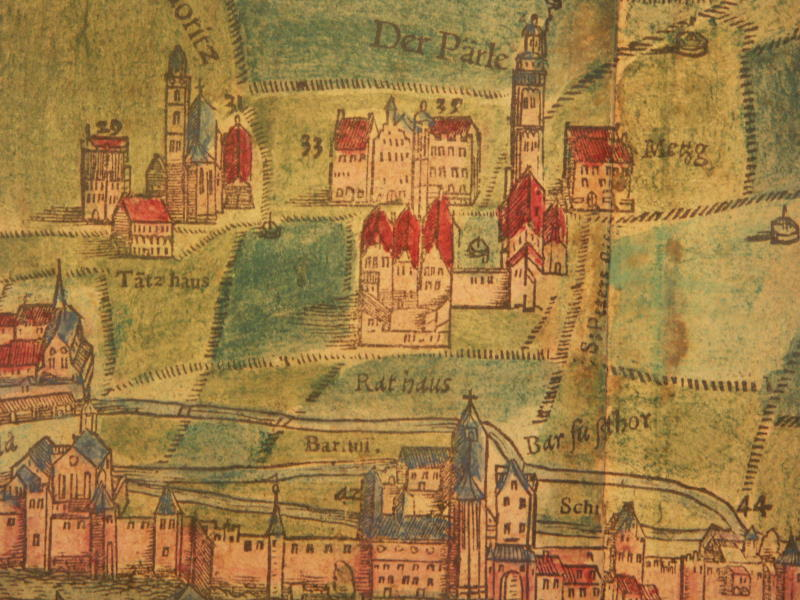
Augsburg, 16th century, by Sebastian Münster; Schwartz's printing house may have been in this drawing.

Schwartz's first book to be printed in Augsburg was recently discovered in storage at the library of the Hebrew Theological College, and today is regarded as a unicum. It is a printing of the Siddur, and includes the Haggadah and Pirke Avot; it contains five colophons (originally, it may have had even more). This book teaches us much about Schwartz and his idea of unique Ashkenazic printing; the clarity of the type, style, and selection are unlike anything else. While there were likely a fair number of printings of this Siddur originally, this one survives uniquely due to being housed at St. Ulrich's and St. Afra's Abbey, Augsburg. The volume came up for sale at Sotheby's New York at the famed Marx sale in 2018.

Schwartz then printed an edition of Rashi on the Pentateuch and the Five Scrolls, the first time he was to use the Sephardic style font (today known as Rashi type). Among his following books are the magisterial 1536 Ashkenazic Mahzor, which printed piyutim and yotzerot. Recently, some scholars have argued that this edition is one of the unique editions of a proto-Ashkenazic-North Italian nussach, which was unique to the early 16th century; others maintain that this was the Nussach of Bavaria.

== The Augsburg Turim ==
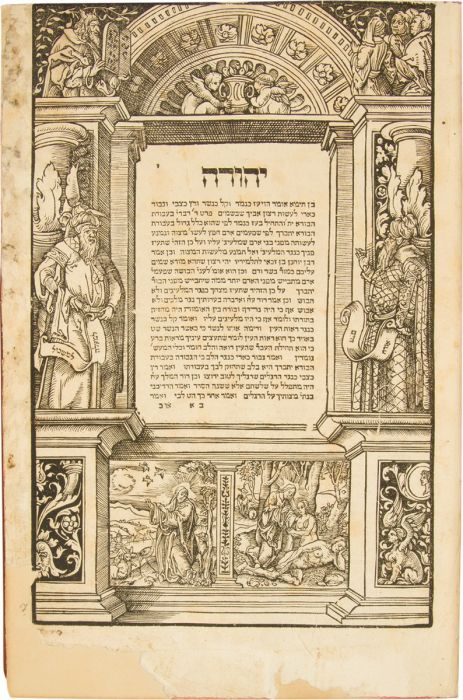
Hans Holbein frame on 16th century Turim (Augsburg, 1540)

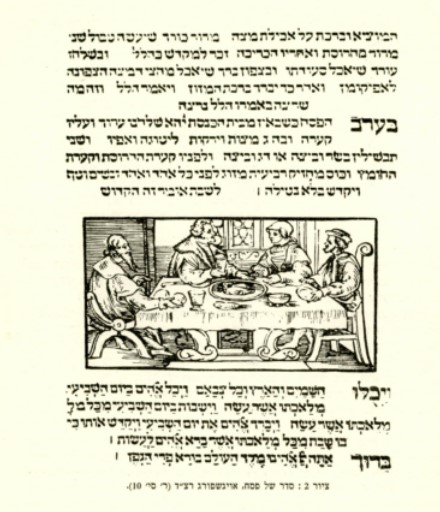
An illustration from the 1536 Augsburg Haggadah depicting the Passover Seder; Habermann, p. 435.

A major printing achievement by Schwartz was his edition of the Turim by Jacob ben Asher, the first so to be printed north of the Alps and in the author's native Germany.

While there had been many editions of the Turim printed previously (including incunable editions printed in Spain, Portugal, and Italy; this was one of the most printed Hebrew works of all time), with later editions in Constantinople and Fano, the Augsburg Turim are special for its precise editorial and aesthetic quality.

Editors on the volume included Elija Levita and Abraham b. Avigdor of Prague (possibly the son of Avigdor Kara, brother-in-law of MaHaRal); also editing was Jacob b. Jakar, Schwartz's son in law. Many of the exemplars also feature a woodcut frame on the opening leaf by Hans Holbein the Younger.

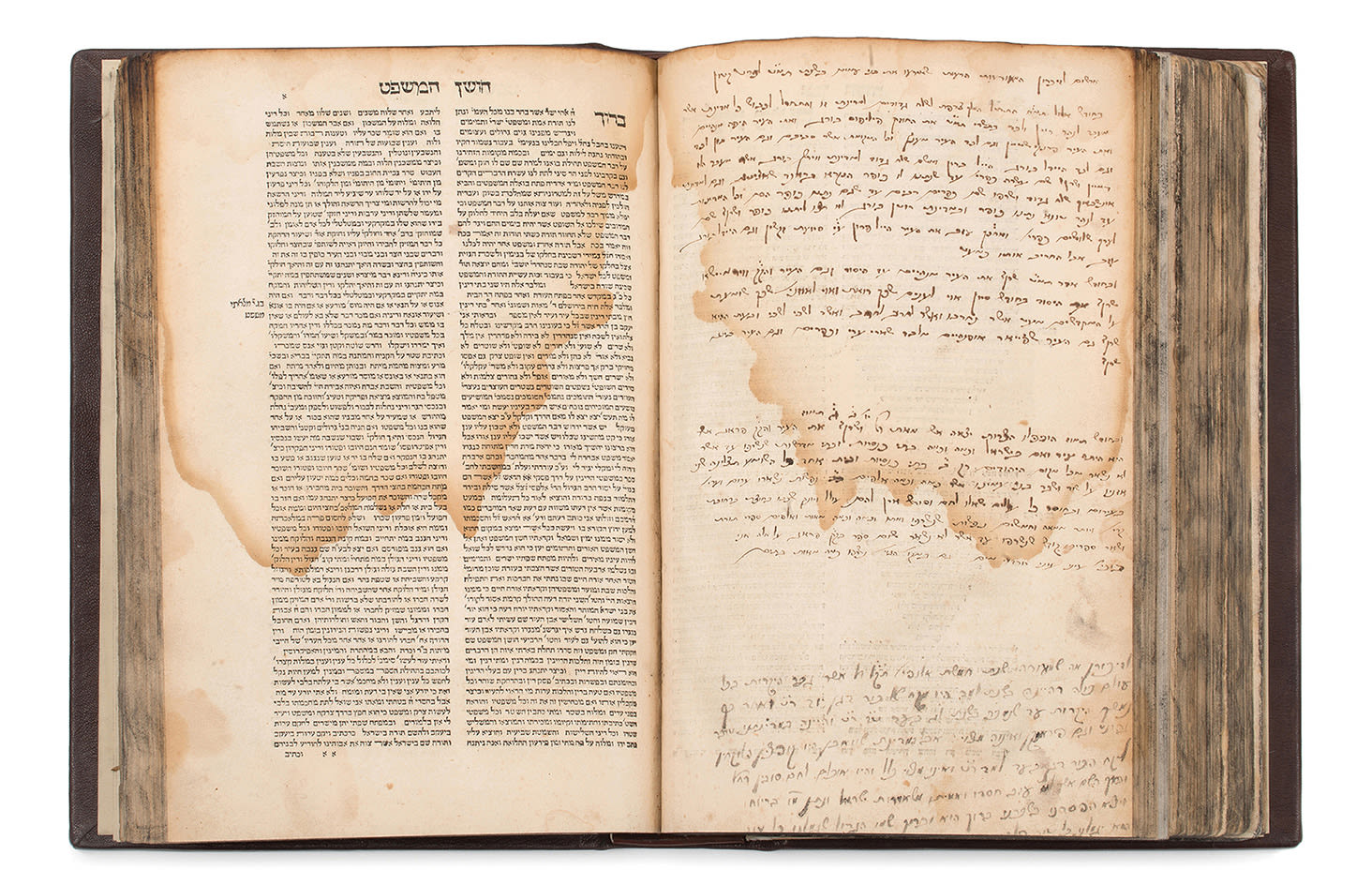
Abraham ben Avigdor's notes on a copy of the Augsburg Turim

In September 2022, a copy of the Augsburg Turim with the handwritten marginalia of Abraham ben Avigdor was for sale at Kedem Auction House in Jerusalem.

The reception of the Augsburg Turim was positive among advanced scholars in The Kingdom of Poland such as Joshua Falk of Lemberg, who used variants from Abraham b. Avigdor's editing to clear problems with earlier and later editions.

Schwartz's granddaughter married Kalonymous Jaffe, the first Hebrew printer in Lublin (Kalonymous was a first cousin to Mordechai Jaffe, author of the Levushim, whom he printed the editio princeps beginning in 1596; see also Jaffe family).

== Final activities ==
Schwartz moved again in 1540–1541, and resumed printing elsewhere after printing his final book in Augsburg, Avkat rokhel by Machir ben Isaac.

Abraham Meir Habermann speculates that Schwartz left after a dispute with Paulus Aemilius. He appeared in Ichenhausen in Bavaria, where he printed a Bible, and afterward in Heddernheim (near Frankfurt am Main) where he printed Naftule Elohim and Simanim 'al ha-Behaye.

He finally reappeared in Lublin, where he is thought to have died in 1549.

== Influence ==
Schwartz's influence on printing seems to have been immediate and have spurred a wide movement of Hebrew printing in the Germanic lands. During Schwartz's career, Hebrew and Yiddish printing began in Isny, Zürich, Konstanz, Frankfurt an der Oder, and Freiburg im Breisgau; following his death, the printing presses of Waldshut-Tiengen and Thannhausen, and ultimately Basel and Hanau, followed in his printing ouvre, material, and style.

Schwartz's longer-term influence on style includes the Ashkenazic fonts used for the Augsburg books continuing to be used in Northern Europe until the 19th century; during the 20th century, the Soncino-Gesellschaft sought to rekindle the wider use of the font on Hebrew fine printing, and a slightly modernized version of Schwartz's invention was used for fine printed books.
