= Shmuel Wosner =

Israeli Ashkenazi rabbi and posek

Rabbi Shmuel Wosner שמואל ואזנר
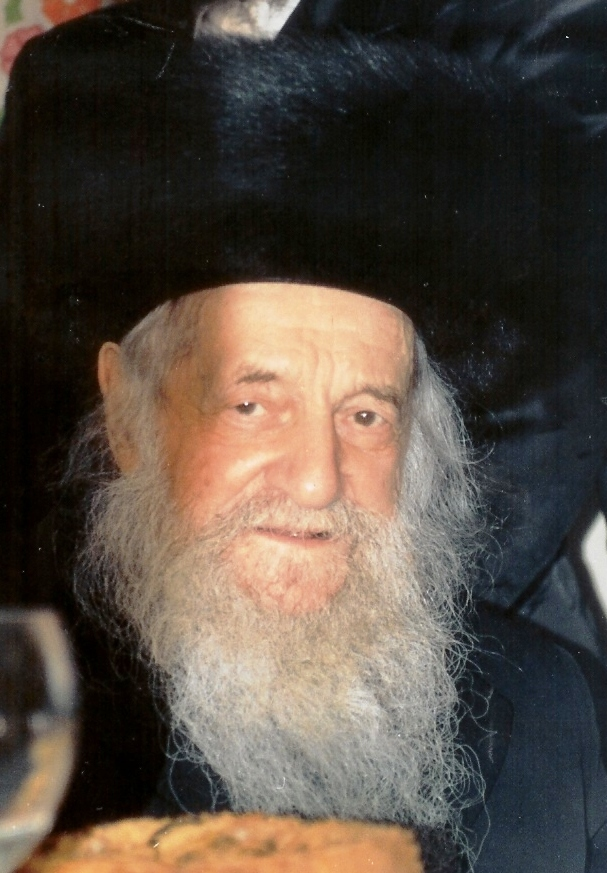
- Rabbi Shmuel Halevi Wosner in 2006

Personal life
- Born: Shmuel Wosner; 4 September 1913 Vienna, Austro-Hungary
- Died: 3 April 2015 (aged 101) Bnei Brak, Israel
- Buried: Bnei Brak, Israel
- Children: Chaim; Bentzion; Joseph
- Parent(s): Yossef Tzvi & Rochel
- Education: Yeshivas Chachmei Lublin

Religious life
- Religion: Judaism

Shmuel HaLevi Wosner (Hebrew: שמואל הלוי ואזנר, Yiddish: שמואל הלוי וואזנער; 4 September 1913 – 3 April 2015) was a prominent Ashkenazi rabbi and posek ("decisor of Jewish law") living in Bnei Brak, Israel. He was known as the Shevet HaLevi after his major work.

== Biography ==
Wosner was born in Vienna, Austria-Hungary and studied in the Yeshivas Chachmei Lublin of Poland led by Rabbi Meir Shapiro. He was also a student of Rabbi Shimon of Zelicov who was the official supervisor at the Yeshiva. In Vienna, he had known and befriended the Rabbi Chanoch Dov Padwa of Galicia. He married and immigrated to Israel before the Holocaust and settled in Jerusalem, where he studied at the Dushinsky yeshiva. It was in that time that, in spite of his young age, he became a member of the Edah HaChareidis. When he relocated to Bnei Brak, upon the incentive of the Chazon Ish, Rabbi Dov Berish Widenfeld of Tshebin, Rabbi Isser Zalman Meltzer, and Rabbi Yitzhak HaLevi Herzog, he established the Zichron Meir neighborhood and Yeshiva Chachmei Lublin, bearing the same name as the one in Lublin where he studied in his youth.

Wosner is the author of several works of Jewish law, including Shevet HaLevi ("The Tribe of Levi"), a comprehensive series of halakhic rulings and responsa on Jewish laws comprising ten volumes, and several other Torah books all bearing the same name. His halakhic opinions are widely quoted in many works on Jewish law both in Hebrew and English. On May 20, 2012 Ichud HaKehillos LeTohar HaMachane held an asifa (gathering) at Citi Field in Queens to address the dangers of the internet. Wosner spoke via live hookup from Israel to the 60,000 attendees. He banned unfiltered internet use for the Jewish community and allowed filtered internet only for business purposes. He died in Bnei Brak at 101 years of age.

Wosner's sons include Rabbi Chaim Wosner (1939–2021), formerly dayan of London's Satmar community, who moved to Bnei Brak to assist his father in the management of the Yeshiva. Another son Rabbi Bentzion Wosner of Monsey, New York, is the av bet din of the Shevet Halevi beis din.

== Funeral ==
Wosner was buried late Saturday night, April 4, 2015, in a funeral attended by an estimated 100,000 people. Severe overcrowding in front of Rabbi Wosner's yeshiva, where his body lay in repose, led to the trampling of three men and a 14-year-old boy. The two men, a 27-year-old resident of Elad and an 18-year-old Toldos Aharon Hasid, died of their wounds. Magen David Adom personnel treated over 100 other mourners who sustained injuries at the event.
