= Chachmei Lublin Yeshiva =

Talmudic university (Lublin, Poland; 1930–1939)

- ישיבת חכמי לובלין
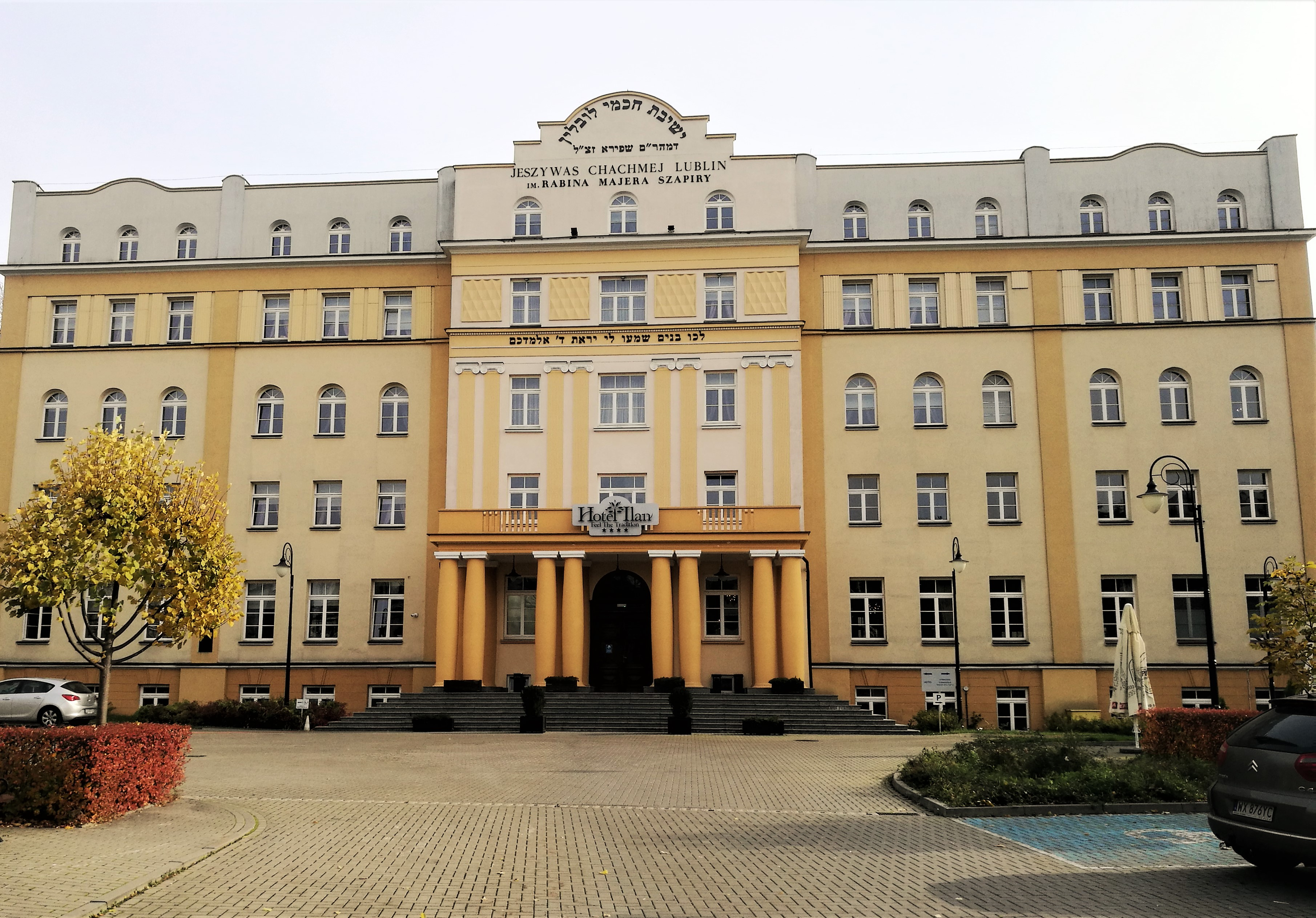
- Front view, 2021

Religion
- Affiliation: Orthodox Judaism
- Ecclesiastical or organisational status: Active
- Leadership: Meir Shapiro (Rosh Yeshiva 1930-1933); Aryeh Tzvi Frumer (Rosh Yeshiva 1934-1939)
- Status: Yeshiva (1930-1939); Synagogue (2007- )

Location
- Location: Lubartowska 85 Lublin, Poland
- Interactive map of Chachmei Lublin Yeshiva
- Coordinates: 51.2578°N 22.5727°E

Architecture
- Completed: 1930

Chachmei Lublin Yeshiva (Hebrew: ישיבת חכמי לובלין, "Academy of the Sages of Lublin"; Polish: Jeszywas Chachmej Lublin) was a Jewish educational institution (yeshiva) that operated in the city of Lublin, Poland from 1930 to 1939. At the time, it was one of the largest in the world.

== History ==
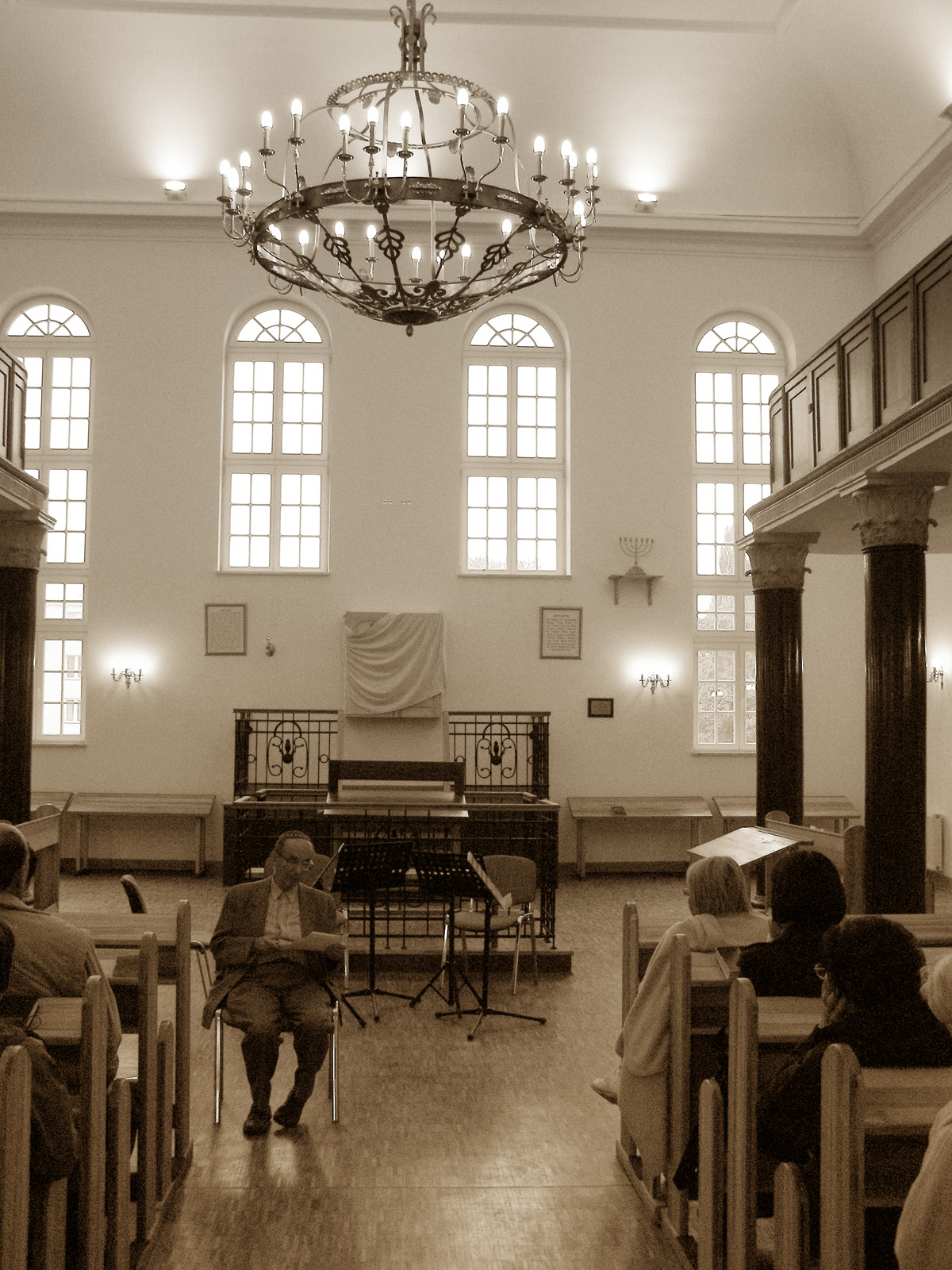
A synagogue inside the yeshiva building, 2008

On May 22–28, 1924, the cornerstone laying ceremony took place for the construction of the yeshiva building. Approximately 50,000 people participated in the event.

The opening ceremony took place on June 24–25, 1930. Apart from thousands of local Jews, around 10,000 people arrived from all over Poland and abroad.

When the German Army took Lublin during World War II, they stripped the interior and may have burned the vast library in the town square. An officer who witnessed the event reported that a brass band played while a Jewish throng loudly wept as the books burned. Recent reporting suggests that the library was not completely destroyed, and more than 800 volumes of the once 15–40,000 volume library have been identified. The building became the regional headquarters of the German Military Police. After the war, in the autumn of 1945, the property was taken over by the state as an abandoned possession and assigned to the newly established Maria Curie-Skłodowska University. It was used by the Medical University of Lublin.

In the 1964, Yeshiva Chachmei Lublin of Detroit was reimbursed for the building, receiving $177,042.25.

In 2003 the building was returned to the Jewish community. Its synagogue, the first to be entirely renovated by the Jewish community of Poland since World War II, was reopened on February 11, 2007.

As of October 2013, a four-star hotel named Hotel Ilan was opened in the building.

During the 2022 Russian invasion of Ukraine, the building was converted by the American Jewish Joint Distribution Committee into a refugee camp for roughly 190 Ukrainian Jewish refugees, including an educational center for refugee children operated by alumni of HaMahanot HaOlim youth group.

== Reputation ==
In order to pass the entrance exams for the yeshiva, candidates had to meet very high standards both in terms of knowledge (memorizing 400 pages from the Talmud) and moral conduct. The youngest candidates could attend a preparatory course called Mechina. The students were divided into two age groups: younger (14–17 years) and older (from 17 years upward). The course of study lasted four years. The curriculum encompassed exclusively studies of the Talmud, its codifications and commentaries. The core of everyday instruction was memorizing the daily folio of the Talmud, and then studying pertinent commentaries by scholars from the medieval and modern period. Four times a week, the rector offered a 3-hour-long lecture presenting the methods of interpretation of Talmudic issues. During these lectures discussion was allowed. At the end of every semester, each student was examined by the rosh yeshiva on his newly acquired knowledge. More talented students gained additional knowledge necessary to perform the function of a rabbi.

== School administration ==
The head spiritual student supervisor (משגיח הרוחני הראשי) was Rabbi Yitzchok Dovid Sholom Mintzberg. The spiritual overseer of the yeshiva was Rabbi Shimon Zelichover. With the death of Rabbi Meir Shapira in 1933, Rabbi Aryeh Zvi Fromer was appointed Rosh Yeshiva and served in the position until it was dispersed by the Nazis in 1939. Rabbi Moshe Friedman, the Rebbe of Boyan-Kraków, was appointed president of the yeshiva.

== The library ==
The yeshiva library which was long thought to have been destroyed in 1940, was determined to have survived based on a report from 1944, when the Soviet Army liberated Lublin. The 1940 report of its burning was claimed to be cited in a Nazi youth magazine called the Die Deutsche Jugend-Zeitung, which was cited by researchers, but never been verified to exist, though the tale of the burning endured throughout the decades.

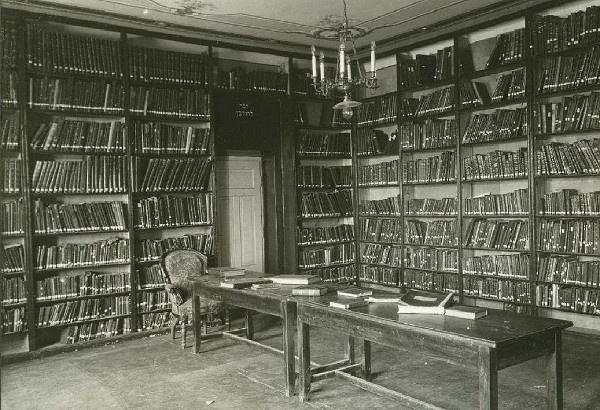
The reading room of the Yeshivas Chachmei Lublin Library (1934)

In April 1941, the head of the Staatsbibliothek of Lublin, Wasyl Kutschabsky hired Rabbi Aron Lebwhol to catalogue the collection, up until Lebwohl was deported and murdered at Majdanek concentration camp in 1942.

Its holdings compiled over 400 years of Jewish literature, with its oldest manuscript dating back to the 16th century.

Rabbi Meir Shapiro built up the collection with local and international donations, of the 15,000-40,000 volumes, among its largest holdings was made thanks to a donation from Congregation Chasam Sopher Rabbi Benjamin Gut of New York City, for an estimated acquisition of 4,000 books and a donation of 1000 USD. Shapiro's collection was then assimilated upon his passing in 1933.

=== Recovery ===
Piotr Nazaruk, a researcher of Lublin's history determined that based upon reports in 1941 and 1944 which verified the library's existence that its holdings were largely dispersed during post-war reconstruction, looking upon reports on the Jewish Committee in Lublin as well as the reports of Polish Committee of National Liberation's Ministry of Education, which had taken control of rescued volumes of literature.

Many instances of books bearing the stamp of the Yeshiva were documented in Israel and the United States since the 2000s, often in antique bookshops and Judaica based auctions. On some of the recovered books, stickers included dates of 1947, when a portion of the collection was shipped to Israel.

Recent findings and current whereabouts include:

- In 2006, five books bearing the stamp was found in the former Chevra Nosim synagogue in Lublin.
- The Jewish Historical Institute, where 130 books have been identified. Holdings include a book called Roman Gadish (1788), and Sefer Bnei Shmuel (1727).
- The National Library of Israel, an additional 100 volumes.
- In 2022, two volumes were found and recovered from the Freie Universitaet of Berlin, and three volumes were found in an Israeli private collection.
- Auction lots from Bidspirit and Kedem Auction House, whose listings include volumes with annotations by Meir Shapiro, which sold for hundreds or thousands of USD.

== Legacy ==
=== Chachmei Lublin of Detroit ===
A yeshiva named Chachmei Lublin was established in Detroit, Michigan, by Rabbi Moshe Rothenberg in the 1940s. Rothenberg had been a student of Rabbi Meir Shapiro in the original Chachmei Lublin yeshiva. The yeshiva thrived for over a decade before it closed. Mr. Sam (Shlomo Leib) and Mrs. Leah Bookstein provided the funding to help purchase the building on the corner of Elmhurst and Linwood Streets.

The Yeshiva had facilities for room and board for boarding students. Rabbi Rothenberg was able to get young men who escaped Europe and made it to Shanghai to come to the United States to study at the Yeshiva. The Yeshiva also accommodated local Jewish day school students.

There is a story that the Yeshiva was not able to get any government assistance because it didn't have a secular library. Rabbi Yaakov Chaim Perlow, the Stoliner Rebbe, who was visiting Detroit, heard about this from a student at the Yeshiva. The Rebbe drove to the Yeshiva in a taxi and a backseat filled with books. He then reviewed each one to ensure that it was appropriate.

Rabbi Meshulam Isaac of Darche Noam Shapell was a student at the Yeshiva. Rabbi Jacob Lustig spent 3–4 years learning in Yeshiva Chochmei Lublin.

=== Chachmei Lublin of Bnei Brak ===
A yeshiva named Chachmei was established in Bnei Brak by Rabbi Shmuel Wosner who was a student of the original yeshiva in Lublin.

== Notable alumni ==
- Rabbi Yehuda Meir Abramowicz
- Yehiel De-Nur
- Joseph Friedenson
- Rabbi Abraham Mordechay Hershberg, Chief Rabbi of Mexico
- Rabbi Pinchas Hirschprung
- Rabbi Chaim Kreiswirth
- Rabbi Yisroel Moshe Olewski
- Rabbi Yonah Sztencl
- Rabbi Shmuel Wosner

== Recent events ==
With the closure of the Chachmei Lublin Yeshiva by the Nazis and the conversion of the yeshiva to a medical academy, the Siyum HaShas was not held in its original venue for many cycles. In 1998 the yeshiva was returned to the Jewish community of Warsaw, which undertook renovations. In March 2005, Rabbi David Singer, an Orthodox Jew from Brooklyn, New York, whose father, Rabbi Joseph Singer, the Pilzno Rav, had been born in Poland, organized the 11th Siyum HaShas in the Chachmei Lublin Yeshiva. Chaired by Rabbi Baruch Taub, rabbi emeritus of Beth Avraham Yoseph of Toronto, the event was linked by satellite to the one in New York and was attended by over 200 participants, including the Rebbes of Sadigura, Modzhitz, Nadvorna, and Biala; Rabbi Yona Metzger, Chief Rabbi of Israel, and Israeli politician Rabbi Menachem Porush.

Singer organized the 12th Siyum HaShas at the Chachmei Lublin Yeshiva on 1 August 2012. Participants viewed a simultaneous broadcast from the event taking place that same day at the MetLife Stadium in New Jersey.

In January 2020, the 13th Siyum HaShas was again held in the yeshiva building.

== See also ==
- Synagogue in Chachmei Lublin Yeshiva
