= Kedem =

Kedem may refer to:

== Surname ==
- Era Kedem, Israli Navy commander, pioneer of Israel torpedo flotilla
- Klara Kedem, Israeli computer scientist
- Kosi Kedem (born 1945), Ghanaian politician
- Ora Kedem (1924–2026), Austrian-Israeli chemist
- Rinat Kedem, American mathematician
- Shamai Kedem Leibowitz, American lawyer and blogger

== Other ==
- "Kedem", two tracks from the double album At the Mountains of Madness
- Kedem Auction House
- Kedem Stream, Judaean Desert
- Operation Kedem
- Kedem Winery
- Kedem Museum of Archaeology in Kedumim, Israel

== See also ==
- Pnei Kedem
- Classical compass winds § Biblical
