= Chachmei Lublin Yeshiva Synagogue =

Orthodox synagogue and yeshiva in Lublin, Poland

- Polish: Synagoga w Jeszywas Chachmej Lublin; Hebrew: בית הכנסת ישיבת חכמי לובלין
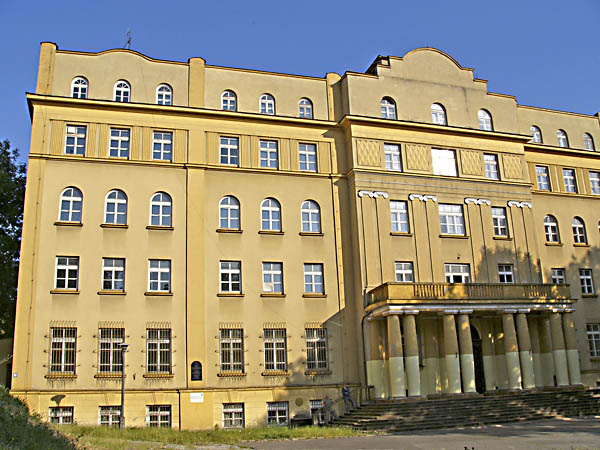
- The synagogue and yeshiva in 2005

- Location of the synagogue and yeshiva in Lublin Voivodeship

Religion
- Affiliation: Hasidic Judaism
- Rite: Nusach Ashkenaz
- Ecclesiastical or organisational status: Synagogue and yeshiva
- Status: Active

Location
- Location: 85 Lubartowska Street, Lublin, Lublin Voivodeship
- Country: Poland
- Coordinates: 51°15′28″N 22°34′22″E

Architecture
- Architect: Agenor Smoluchowski
- Type: Synagogue architecture
- Style: Classical Revival; Art Deco
- Completed: 1930

Specifications
- Interior area: 200 square metres (2,200 sq ft)
- Materials: Brick

The Chachmei Lublin Yeshiva Synagogue (Polish: Synagoga w Jeszywas Chachmej Lublin; Hebrew: בית הכנסת ישיבת חכמי לובלין) is a Hasidic Jewish congregation, synagogue, and yeshiva, located at 85 Lubartowska Street, in Lublin, in the Lublin Voivodeship of Poland.

Designed by Agenor Smoluchowski in a mix of the Classical Revival and Art Deco styles, the synagogue and yeshiva were completed in 1930 and are located in the Chachmei Lublin Yeshiva building complex.

== History ==
The synagogue was completed in 1930 along with the rest of the complex of the Chachmei Lublin Yeshiva. Apart from religious functions, it was used as a lecture hall for the yeshiva, having been able to seat over 200 students. During World War II, the building was desecrated by the Nazis, and all of the contents were damaged or dispersed.

=== Since World War II ===
After the war, the building of the yeshiva was taken over by the Medical University of Lublin. The room of the synagogue was redecorated and adjusted to needs of the university. The colouring of walls and columns was changed, and the windows located on the Eastern wall were bricked up.

In late 2003, the building was returned to the Jewish Community of Warsaw, which decided to redecorate and reconstruct the synagogue. The restoration commenced in May 2005, following the university's departure from the structure. A rotten ceiling over the prayer room was replaced, and a new parquet floor was laid. Relying in part on pre-War photographs, the original colouring of columns and the windows on the Eastern wall were recreated. Also, the bimah and steps to Ark, which were surrounded by a balustrade, were restored.

However, the Ark could not be recreated at the time. In its place, a wardrobe and 2-metre (7 ft) high chandelier with 16 lights was installed. In the second half of 2007, the kehilla ordered the missing elements of the interior.

==== Renewed opening ====
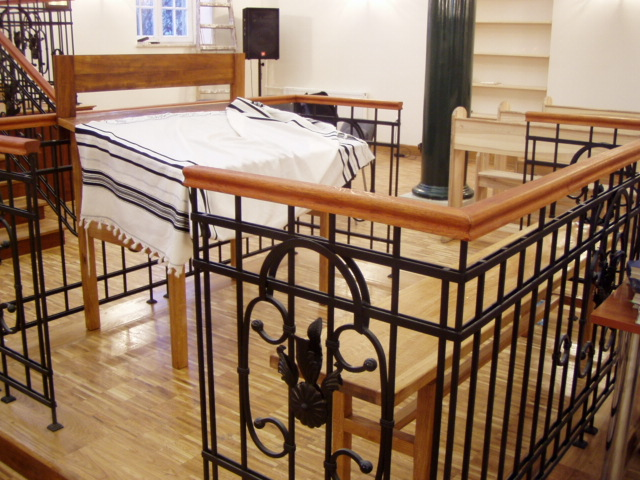
Bimah

Official re-opening of the synagogue took place on February 11, 2007. As the reconstruction of the interior of the synagogue was funded entirely by the Polish-Jewish Community, it was the first such ceremony in the post-War Poland.

During the ceremony, two replicas of mezuzahs with Polish Eagle were placed- the first one on the front door of Chachmei Lublin Yeshiva, and the other one on door of the synagogue. The original mezuzah had been donated during the opening in 1930 by a tzadik from Czortków (now Chortkiv, Ukraine), Israel Friedman. Next, the chief rabbi of Poland, Michael Schudrich carried in a Sefer Torah, funded on June 17, 2005, by Americans Harley and Marie Lippman, on the occasion of their daughter Juliet's Bat Mitzvah. Originally the Torah was located in Nożyk Synagogue in Warsaw, but on January 22, 2006, it was carried into the Small Synagogue in Chachmei Lublin Yeshiva, after which it was returned to Warsaw. The Foundation for the Preservation of Jewish Heritage in donated a gold-plated menorah and a plaque about the extermination of the Jews of Lublin.

There were over 600 guests for the ceremony, including representatives of Polish and foreign Jewish community as well people from university, cultural and religious fields: Michael Schudrich, Piotr Kadlčik, Roman Litman, the chairman of Lublin branch of the Jewish Community of Warsaw, David Peleg, Israel's ambassador to Poland, Józef Życiński, the metropolitan archbishop of Lublin, Adam Wasilewski, the president of Lublin, representatives of local government, rabbi Yehiel Kaufman from Borough Park, Brooklyn, Jehuda Widawski, an inhabitant of Lublin, and other guests.

== Interior ==
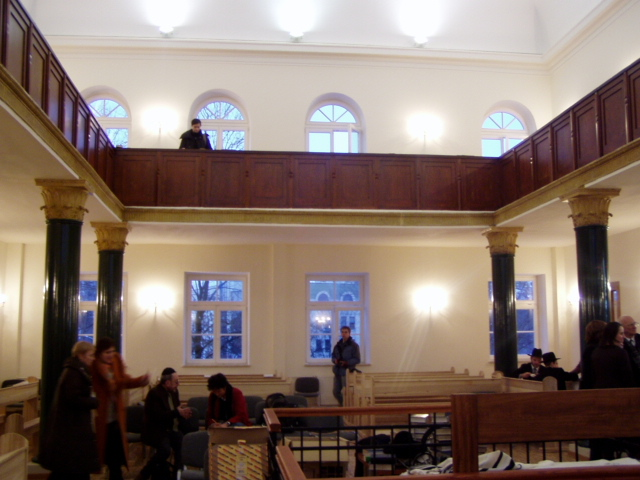
Platform for women

The synagogue, having an area of 200 square metres (2,153 sq ft) is within the second and third floor levels in the southern wing of the building. The main prayer room has a section for women, which has an entrance at the third floor. A separate staircase leads to the platform. It is based on 8 green, round Corinthian columns, placed on three sides of the room.

An ark is located on the western wall. In front of it, there is a platform rounded by a balustrade. The platform is preceded by five steps. On the left side of the wardrobe a ner tamid and a plaque with an inscription in the Hebrew are placed. On the right side, another plaque in Hebrew, a gold-plated menorah and a plaque in the English about the extermination of the Jews of Lublin are placed. The English inscription reads:

This menorah, symbolizing the reborn State of Israel is a gift to Jewish community in Lublin in memory of 40,000 Lublin Jews killed by Nazi Germans during World War II.

A square bimah with two entrances is located in the middle of the room, also rounded by a balustrade. Formerly, a 180-kilogram (400 lb) menorah with the Polish Eagle on the top was located in synagogue. It was given to the yeshiva by the Jewish kehilla from Przemyśl.

The content of the interior is a reconstruction based on the pre-War photos.

The only content that may have survived from the pre-war synagogue was an embroidered parochet. For years, it had been kept in the Chewra Nosim Synagogue before being moved to the Small Synagogue in Chachmei Lublin Yeshiva, to be moved upon the completion of the new ark, built by Sylwia Piechnik (the ark could not be entirely based on pre-War photos since they were black-and-white. Instead, it was decided to paint the Ark in green and brown, with some gold-plated elements.

== Gallery ==
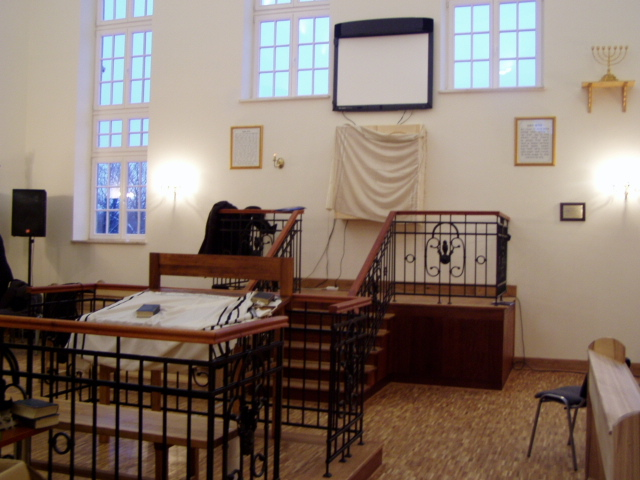
The Ark

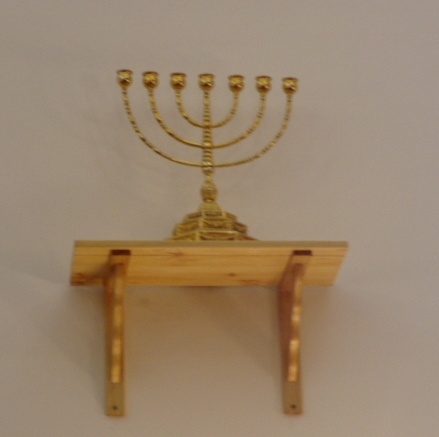
Menorah

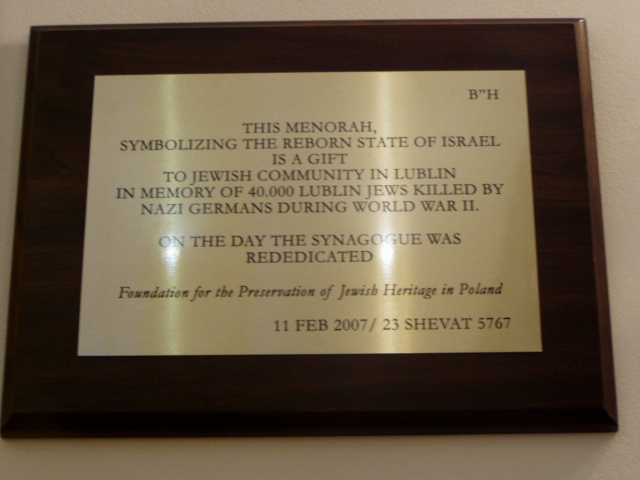
Plaque

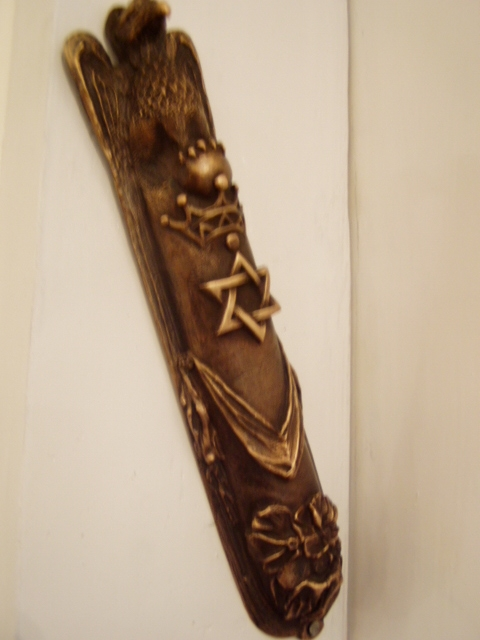
Mezuzah

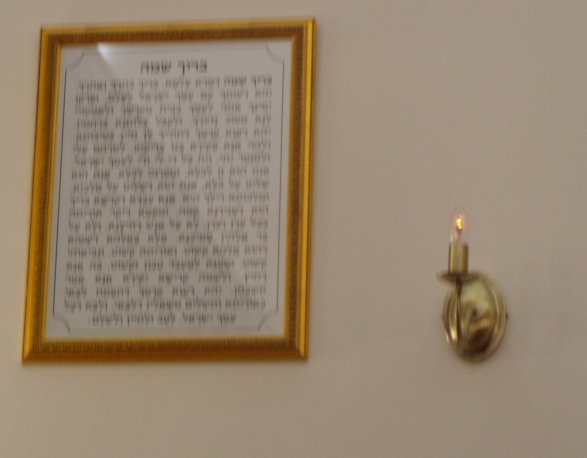
Ner tamid and inscription

== See also ==
- Chronology of Jewish Polish history
- History of the Jews in Poland
- List of active synagogues in Poland
