= Joseph Friedenson =

Shmuel Yosef Friedenson
- Born: April 1922; Łódź, Poland
- Died: February 2013 (aged 90)
- Known for: Founding Dos Yiddishe Vort (דאס אידישע ווארט)
- Spouses: Gittel Leah Zilberman (m. 1942; died 2006): Yocheved Friedenon
- Children: Esther Gruenstein; Chana Kahn; Rosie Golding

Joseph Friedenson (Yiddish: יוסף פֿרידענזאָן, 1922–2013) was a Holocaust survivor, Holocaust historian, Yiddish writer, lecturer, and editor of Dos Yiddishe Vort.

== Biography ==
Friedenson was born in Łódź, Poland in April 1922, to Rabbi Eliezer Gershon, an activist for Agudath Israel of Poland and the editor of the Beth Jacob Journal, curricula used throughout the Bais Yaakov movement in pre-World War II Europe.

Friedenson studied in Yeshiva Chachmei Lublin.

When World War II broke out, Friedenson's family fled to Warsaw, eventually becoming prisoners of the Warsaw Ghetto where Joseph married Gittel Leah Zilberman of Szydłowiec. They were smuggled out of the ghetto and subsequently ended up spending several years in the slave labor camp of Starchowicz, before it was liquidated.

The family arrived at Auschwitz in July 1944. Joseph endured death marches, confinement in Ohrdruf and several other concentration camps, and was finally liberated from Buchenwald in April, 1945, by the United States Army.

Mrs. Friedenson remained in Auschwitz and was liberated by the Russian Army in early 1945. The couple was reunited several months later, spent several years in post-war Germany working to help other survivors rebuild their lives, and immigrated to the United States in 1951 where Joseph joined Agudath Israel of America.

He authored several books on the Holocaust, published by ArtScroll.

He died on February 23, 2013, at his home in Manhattan at the age of 90.

His son-in-law, Rabbi Yosef Chaim Golding, authored his biography titled Faith amid the Flames, published by ArtScroll publication.
