= Sigmund Herzl =

- Born: 26 May 1830; Vienna, Austrian Empire
- Died: 9 February 1889 (aged 58); Vienna, Austria-Hungary
- Writing career
- Pen name: Alfred Teniers; Idnum; Franz Emil von Rudolf
- Language: German

Sigmund A. Herzl (26 May 1830 – 9 February 1889), also known by the pen name Alfred Teniers, was an Austrian poet, translator, and businessman.

== Biography ==
Herzl was born in Vienna to the Jewish merchant Adam Herzl, and was orphaned at an early age. He attended German-language primary and secondary schools before relocating to Hungary in October 1845.

After a period spent travelling and studying languages, especially French and Italian, Herzl took a position in banking. For a period, he served as a local official attached to the French embassy in Vienna under the Duke of Gramont.

Herzl has been described as "desperately unhappy in life," as reflected in his correspondences, including letters to contemporaries such as Herzberg-Fränkl. From 1873 onwards, he withdrew into seclusion and devoted himself almost exclusively to commercial work. Herzl suffered from ill health from March 1886 onward, seeking treatment in Baden bei Wien and elsewhere. He spent his final years in Vienna, where he died on 9 February 1889.

== Literary work ==
Herzl contributed feuilletons, travel sketches, and literary criticism to various Austrian and southern German newspapers. He was also known for his translations from Hungarian and French into German, notably a well-regarded 1887 translation of poems by Sándor Petőfi, whom he had previously profiled in a short biography in 1866.

Under the pseudonym "Alfred Teniers", Herzl published several volumes of lyric poetry: Liederbuch eines Dorfpoeten (1853), Lieder eines Gefangenen (1874), and Prager Elegien (1880). The latter was only printed as a manuscript. A planned anthology, Für Lebemänner (1887), was never released.

Two years after his death, Gustav Andreas Ressel published Alfred Teniers' gesammelte Dichtungen herausgegeben (1891), which was reissued in a second edition in 1895.

== Selected publications ==
- Liederbuch eines Dorfpoeten [Songbook of a Village Poet]. 1853.
- Lieder eines Gefangenen [Songs of a Prisoner]. 1874.
- Prager Elegien [Prague Elegies]. 1880.
- Gedichte von Alexander Petőfi [Poems of Alexander Petőfi]. 1887.
- Ressel, G. A., ed. (1891). A. Teniers' Gesammelte Dichtungen [Alfred Teniers' Collected Poems].
