= Meir Shapiro =

Polish Hasidic rabbi and rosh yeshiva

Rabbi Meir Shapiro
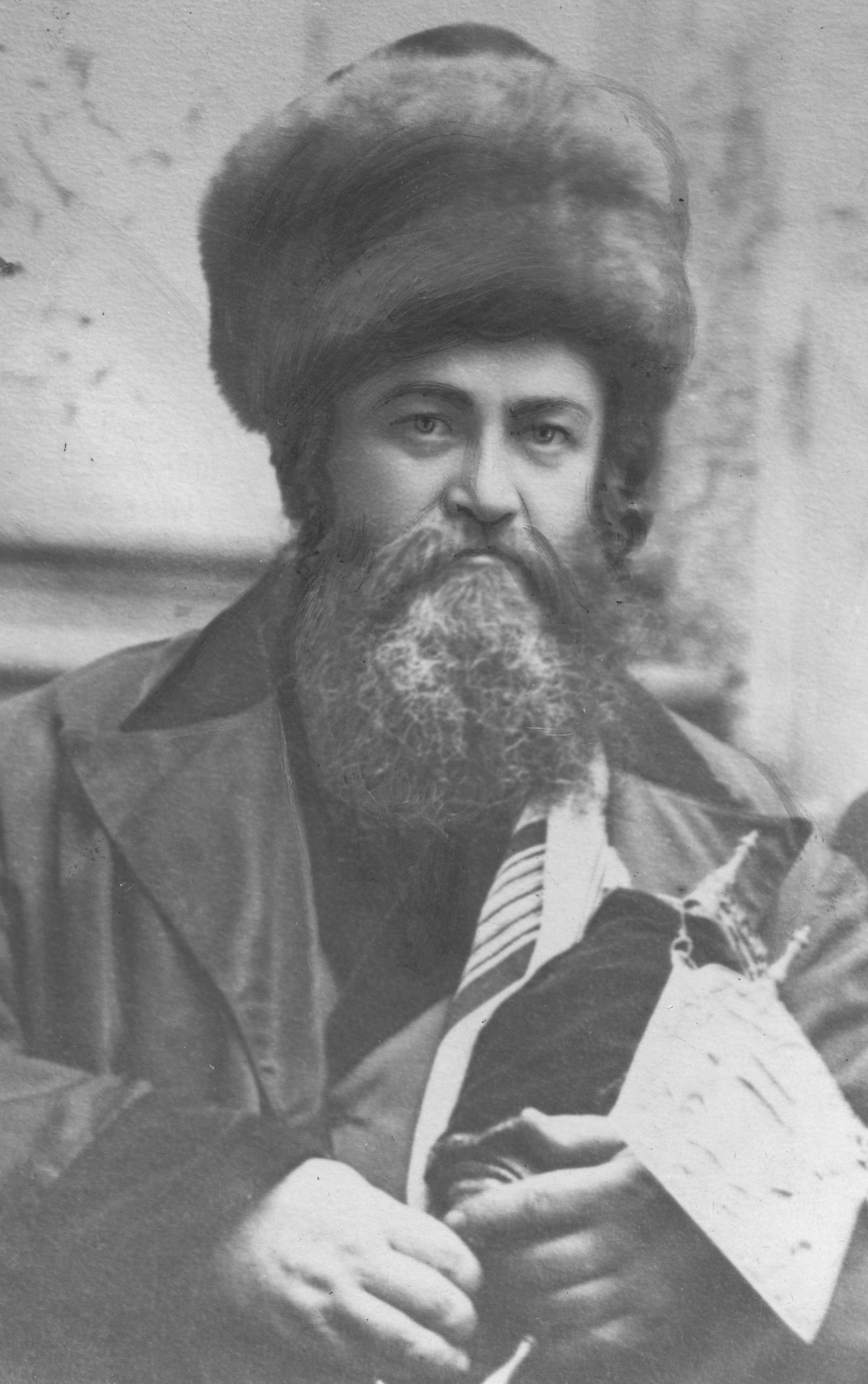

Personal life
- Born: Yehuda Meir Shapiro; 3 March 1887 Shatz, Austria-Hungary present day Romania
- Died: 27 October 1933 (aged 46) Lublin, Poland
- Buried: Lublin, Poland; later reinterred in Jerusalem, Israel
- Spouse: Malka Toba Shapiro
- Parent(s): Yaakov Shimshon of Shatz; Rebbetzin Margulya
- Occupation: Rabbi, rosh yeshiva

Religious life
- Religion: Judaism
- Denomination: Orthodox

Jewish leader
- Position: Rosh yeshiva
- Yeshiva: Chachmei Lublin Yeshiva
- Began: 1930
- Ended: 1933
- Other: Rabbi of Galina, Sanok, and Pietrokov

Yehuda Meir Shapiro (Polish: Majer Jehuda Szapira; 3 March 1887 – 27 October 1933) was a prominent Polish Hasidic rabbi and rosh yeshiva, also known as the Lubliner Rav. He is noted for his promotion of the Daf Yomi study program in 1923, and establishing the Chachmei Lublin Yeshiva in 1930.

During the years 1922 to 1927 Shapiro was the first Orthodox Jew to become a member in the Sejm (Parliament) of the Second Polish Republic representing the Jewish minority of the country.

== Biography ==
=== Early years ===
Rabbi Yehuda Meir Shapiro was born on the 7th day of Adar (in Jewish tradition, also the birth date of Moses) in the city of Shatz, Bucovina, then in the Austrian-Hungarian Empire, now in Romania, in 1887. He was a descendant of Rabbi Pinchas Shapiro of Korets, one of the students of the Baal Shem Tov, and from his maternal side, of Rabbi Joseph ben Isaac Bekhor Shor, a French tosafist. After cheder, Shapiro began to study with his grandfather, the Baal Minchas Shai (Rabbi Shmuel Yitzhak Schor. Another of his early teachers was Rabbi Shulem Moshkovitz.

In 1906 he "married the daughter of Ya'akov Breitman, a wealthy landowner of Tarnopol, Galicia."

=== Galina ===
His first rabbinical posting came in 1911 when he was appointed Rav of Galina. He spent ten years in the city, during which time he established a yeshiva called Bnei Torah. Construction commenced in 1920. The yeshiva held a Talmud Torah, a place to train rabbis, and a kitchen to feed orphaned children. It ran at a budget of over half a million marks. This yeshiva served as a prototype for what was later to become Chachmei Lublin.

=== Sanok ===
After leaving Galina, Shapiro began serving as Rav of Sanok in 1920.

=== Petrakov ===
In 1924, Shapiro accepted his third rabbinical position in Petrakov/Piotrkow.

=== Lublin ===
On 14 June 1931, he was appointed rabbi of Lublin in the old synagogue of the Maharshal.

== Daf Yomi ==
Shapiro introduced the revolutionary idea of Daf Yomi (Hebrew: דף יומי, "page [of the] day" or "daily folio"), a daily regimen undertaken to study the Babylonian Talmud one folio (a daf consists of both sides of the page) each day. Under this regimen, the entire Talmud is completed, one day at a time, in a cycle of seven and a half years. Rabbi Shapiro introduced his idea at the First World Congress of the World Agudath Israel in Vienna on 16 August 1923. The first cycle of Daf Yomi commenced on the first day of Rosh Hashanah 5684 (11 September 1923). Now in its 14th cycle, Daf Yomi has been taken up by tens of thousands of Jews worldwide. Incidentally, there are 2,711 pages in the Babylonian Talmud.

== Yeshivas Chachmei Lublin ==
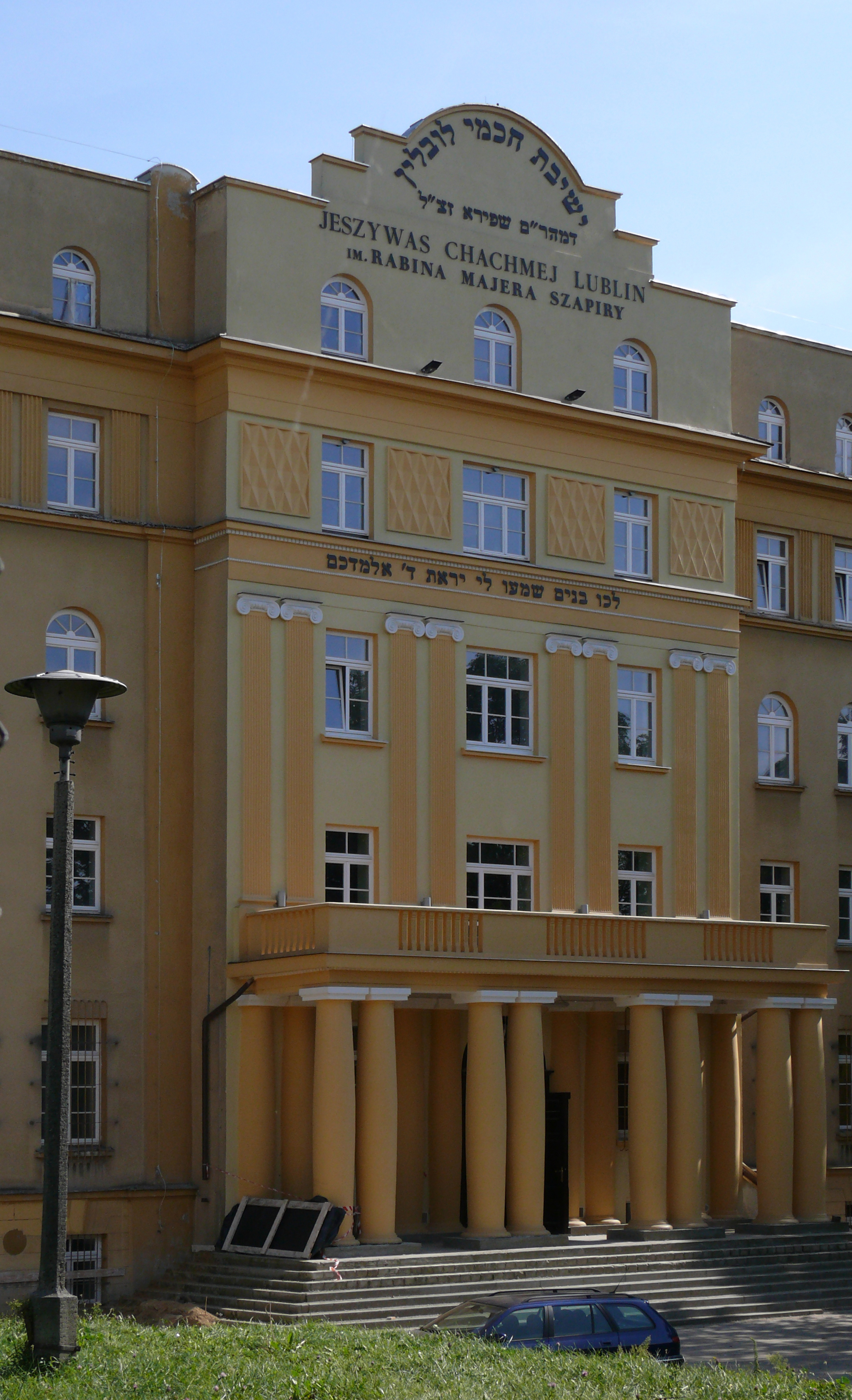
Chachmei Lublin Yeshiva.

Yeshivas Chachmei Lublin was, along with Daf Yomi, Shapiro's greatest achievement. He conceived of a yeshiva for Hasidic Poland, modeled on Lithuanian yeshivas such as Volozhin, Slabodka and Novardok, but which would train Hasidic rabbis as the next generation to lead Polish Jewry. The Yeshiva was housed in a massive building, housed hundreds of students, and had a vast library of over 100,000 books.

On 22–28 May 1924, the cornerstone laying ceremony took place for the construction of the yeshiva building. Approximately 20,000 people participated in the event. The opening ceremony took place on 24–25 June 1930. Apart from thousands of local Jews, around 10,000 people arrived from all over Poland and abroad. Shapiro served as rosh yeshiva until his death.

== Łódź ==
In 1932 Shapiro was approached by leaders of the Jewish Community of Łódź, who wanted to offer him the position of Chief Rabbi of Łódź. Many people wanted to appoint Rabbi Mendel Alter of Kalish, (b. 1877, Ger) the brother to the Gerrer Rebbe (and youngest son of the Sfas Emes) to this position. Rabbi Shapiro negotiated that a large part of his wage would go to pay off the debts that Chachmei Lublin was still struggling to pay off. Eventually it was decided to give it to Rabbi Shapiro. After all the protracted negotiation that went on to get Rabbi Shapiro into this position, he died three days after being appointed Chief Rabbi.

== Political activities ==
=== Agudat Yisrael ===
He attended the founding conference of Agudat Israel in 1912 and in 1914 he became head of the Education Department of Agudas Yisrael in East Galicia (southern Poland), becoming president in 1922 of Agudas Yisrael in Poland.

From 1922-1928 Shapiro was a member of parliament in the Polish Sejm.

== Death ==
Shapiro became ill with typhus in 1933 and died within the month, on 27 October 1933 (7 Cheshvan 5694) at the age of 46.

== Family ==
Shlomo Artzi, an Israeli musical artist, is Shapiro's grand-nephew.

== Works ==
- Ohr HaMeir - It was in Petrakov that he printed his book of responsa entitled Ohr HaMeir in 1926. As a work it operates on many different subjects, from philosophy to halacha.
- Imrei Daas - a compilation of Torah thoughts on Halacha and Aggada, which was lost during World War II. The book contained an approbation from Rabbi Meir Arik of Meturnah.
- Vortelach - Shapiro was a quick and brilliant thinker, and his numerous vortelach (short responsa) have been collected in numerous volumes, and quoted in many books.

== See also ==
- History of Jews in Poland
