= Kedem Auction House =

Israeli auctioneers

Kedem
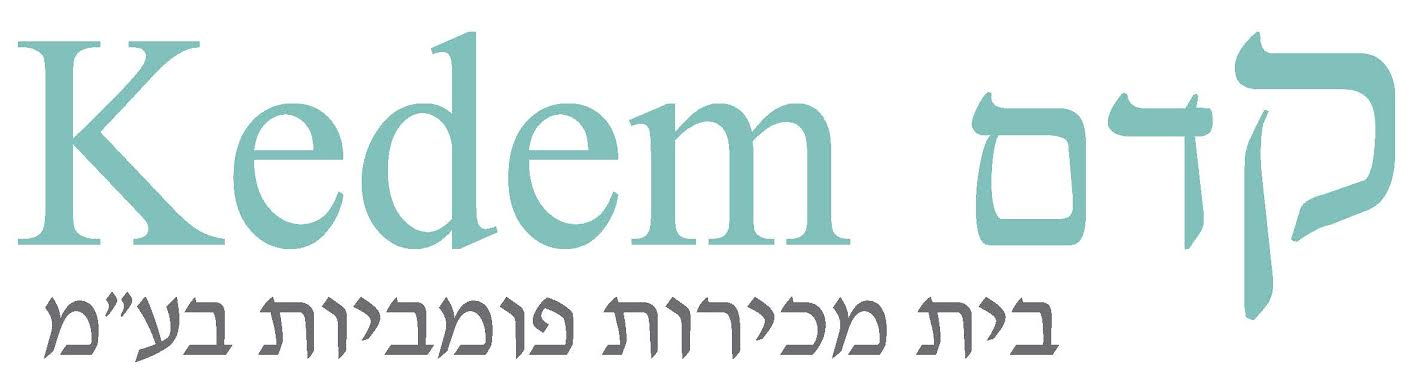
- Type: Public company
- Industry: Auctioneering, specialty retail
- Founded: 2008
- Founder: Meron Eren, Avishai Galer, Eran Reiss
- Headquarters: Jerusalem, Israel
- Products: Judaica and Israeliana, fine arts, books and manuscripts

The Kedem Auction House was founded in 2008 in Jerusalem as an auction house for Judaica and Israeliana (i.e. items relating to Israel and the pre-state Zionist period). Kedem is one of the leading auction houses in this field in Israel and worldwide.

== History ==
Kedem was founded by Meron Eren (born 1963), a farmer by profession, Avishai Galer (born 1974) a rabbi and teacher who lives in Modi'in Illit, and Eran Reiss (born 1966). The owners dealt for many years with Hebrew ancient books and manuscripts related to the history of the Jewish people and their culture. While Galer specialized in religious books and rabbinical manuscripts, Eren specialized in Jewish and Modern Israeli culture. Reiss later left the auction house.

At first the company's offices were located in the industrial park of Givat Shaul, the auctions taking place in Belgium House in the Givat Ram Campus of the Hebrew University. In 2012 an "Israeli art item auction" took place at the Nachum Gutman Museum. Later Kedem moved to Jerusalem's city center, to the cellar of Heichal Shlomo Building. For that purpose an area of 250 m^{2} was leased, and the place was renovated at the cost of almost 400,000 NIS. Today Kedem includes offices, an exhibition hall, storehouse for 300 items and a vault room.

Since its opening, the auction house has developed and grown to be the first in its field, sustaining a big staff of trained workers and experts. Kedem also has a representative in North America.

Kedem runs seven auctions a year, the last being dedicated to the "rare and important items" category. In the first auctions the sales circulation was US$60,000, but by 2012 had increased to US$750,000. In 2014 the "rare and important items" auction took place at the Leonardo Plaza Hotel in Jerusalem, and the opening prices' overall rate was set above US$1,000,000.

Single items and whole collections in various fields connected with Judaism and the history of the Jews and the Land of Israel arrive at Kedem for evaluation and sale. Among the auction house customers are public institutions in Israel and worldwide, including national libraries and universities, public and private museums and archives, alongside private collectors. Among its permanent customers are the Library of Congress, Yale University and the British Library.

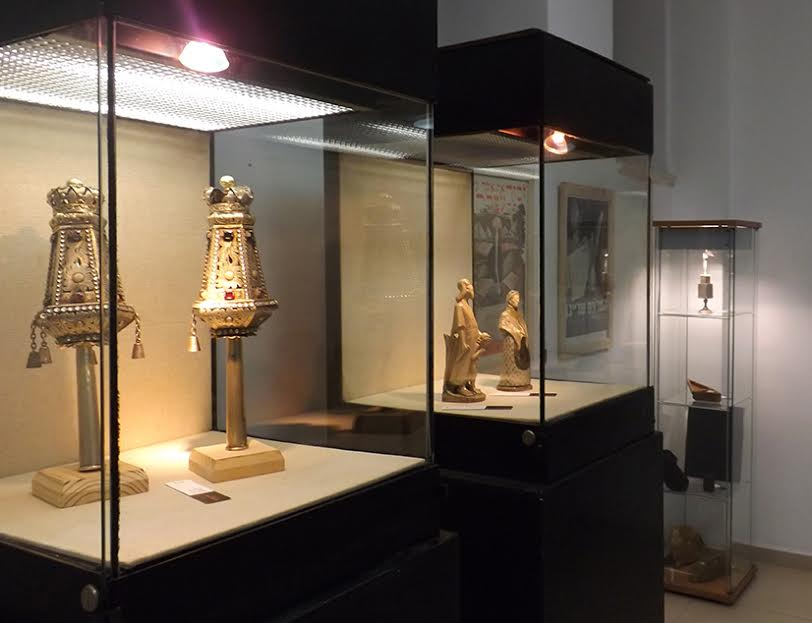
Items in Kedem's Gallery

In 2014 Kedem was mentioned as an optional buyer of the art collection of the IDB Group, estimated by millions of NIS worth.

== Etymology ==
The name Kedem was chosen for the auction house because it combines meanings of past and origins ('kadum') with development and future ('kadima'). Also the auction house is active in the Middle East, known as "kedem" in ancient Hebrew.

== Expertise ==
Kedem's expertise has broadened over the years, and it now specializes in four categories:

1. Religious books, manuscripts and rabbinical letters, especially rare books and paper items.
2. Israeli artifacts, numismatics and medallions – Kedem is the only auction house to hold auctions dedicated exclusively to Israeli collectibles, including items connected with Israeli history, Jewish History in Israel and in the diaspora, Zionism and Israeli and Jewish culture. Until Kedem was established there was no auction house specializing in Israeliana.
3. Judaica items – ancient Jewish ritual objects, amulets, Shabbat tablecloths, Havdallah towers, items from Jewish culture and the Jewish spiritual world
4. Israeli & international art – from early Bazalel masters through to contemporary Israeli artists, including artistic statues, posters, paintings and more. Works by well-known international artists are also for sale.

== Auctions of note ==
Over the years Kedem sold some extraordinarily veritable and unique items, as can be studied by their price:

- In 2009 the Hasidic book "Noam Elimelech" of rabbi Elimelech of Lizhensk was sold for $300,000.
- In 2012 a rare Talmud book, having the Vilna Gaon's notes on it, was sold for $500,000.
- In 2013 Kedem sold Arnie Druk's collection: tens of thousands of Israeli and Jewish art items, photographs, Herzl's and Rabin's documents, children's books in Yiddish, wines, anti-Semitic postcards, Kibbutz Haggadahs and more were exhibited publicly for the first time.
- In 2014 documents of the Nuremberg trials were presented after having been found in the flea market in Jaffa. The collection included more than 2,000 printed papers, 500 Xerox copies and hand-written lists and newspapers shards documenting the trials. At the same year a copy of the Babylonian Talmud privately owned by rabbi Ovadiah Yosef from his time as the Jewish community's rabbi in Egypt was sold for $50,000, the sole copy of the lost book of the Holocaust's author, Yehiel De-Nur also known under the pen name of "Ka-Tsetnik", a private dedication of Herzl from 1900 sold for $67,000, a "private-secret" document sent by Shimon Peres to rabbi Ovadiah Yosef, then leader of Israeli party Shas, ensuring all kinds of political promises should the party join his coalition in the attempt of overthrowing incumbent Israeli prime minister Shamir – historically known by the name "The Dirty Trick" – and Eichmann's prosecution team's personal documents, partially found in trash, containing remarks about Eichmann's body language.
- in 2015 a volume from Eliezer Ben-Yehuda's first edition of the first Hebrew dictionary was presented. The volume, which was published in 1908, contained handwritten notes and remarks written by Ben-Yehuda himself. On that same year the iconic flag of Israel, which was raised at the top of the SS Exodus and a personal diary written in Yiddish by one of the ship's passengers, were presented as well. Other items presented at the auction house in 2015 were Arik Einstein's piano, David Ben-Gurion's personal love letters, written between 1932 and 1935 to his then lover Regina (Rega) Klapholz, the Hillel Storch archive containing documents and correspondence about operation white buses and a letter written in 1934 by Elza Einstein, wife of renowned Jewish-German physicist Albert Einstein, in which the latter added a postscript saying that "In Germany, receiving a letter with this signature would send the reader to a concentration camp".
- in 2015 a legal dispute took place regarding the auctioning of the first drafts of the Israeli declaration of independence, which outlined the Zionist narrative at the time and described the chain of events that led to the establishment of Israel. In late 2015 the state of Israel appealed to the Jerusalem district court demanding to pull the drafts from the auction catalog claiming that the selling of the draft is an infringes on the state's right to keep an asset "of deep symbolic significance" that belongs to the state and the public. In its verdict, the court ruled that the drafts will not be auctioned and shall remain in the hands of the 'Kedem' auction house for safe keeping, for a period of 6 months.
