= Sabil Abu Nabbut =

Public fountain in Jaffa, Israel

Coordinates: 32°02′50.00″N 34°45′59.20″E

- سبيل أبو نبوت
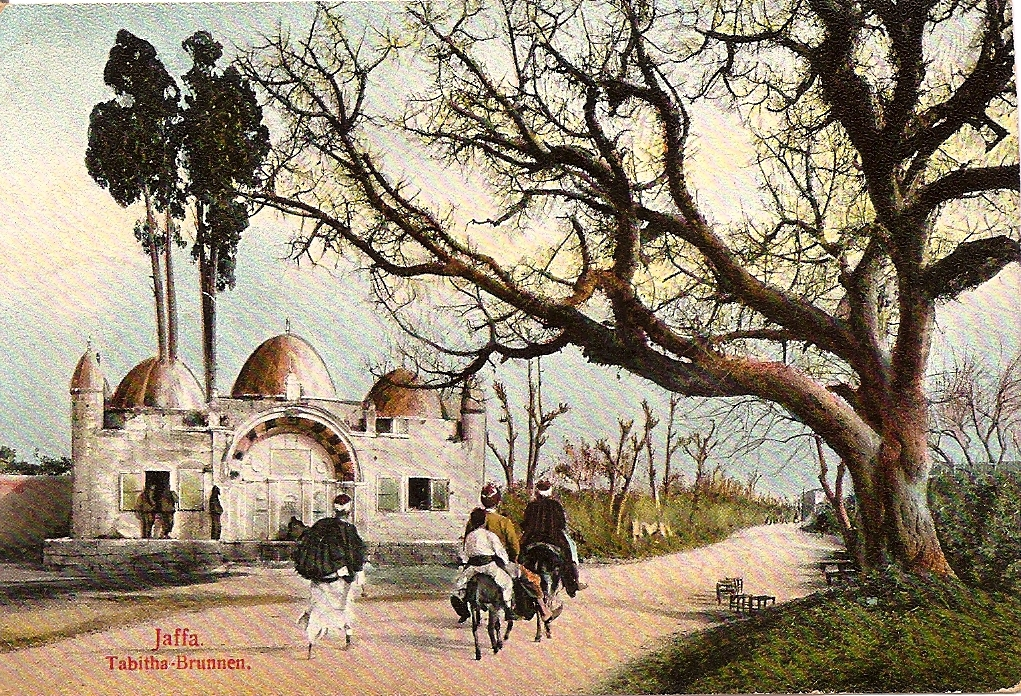
- Sabil Abu Nabbut, old postcard from the British Mandate of Palestine period
- Interactive map of the Sabil Abu Nabbut area

General information
- Type: Public fountain (sabil)
- Architectural style: Ottoman
- Location: Jaffa, Israel
- Construction started: 1815
- Completed: 1816

Sabil Abu Nabbut (Arabic: سبيل أبو نبوت) also known as Tabitha's Well is a public fountain ("sabil") in Jaffa, Israel, built in 1815/16 CE during the Ottoman period in Palestine. Its main purpose was to facilitate the journey between Jaffa and Jerusalem.

== History and architecture ==
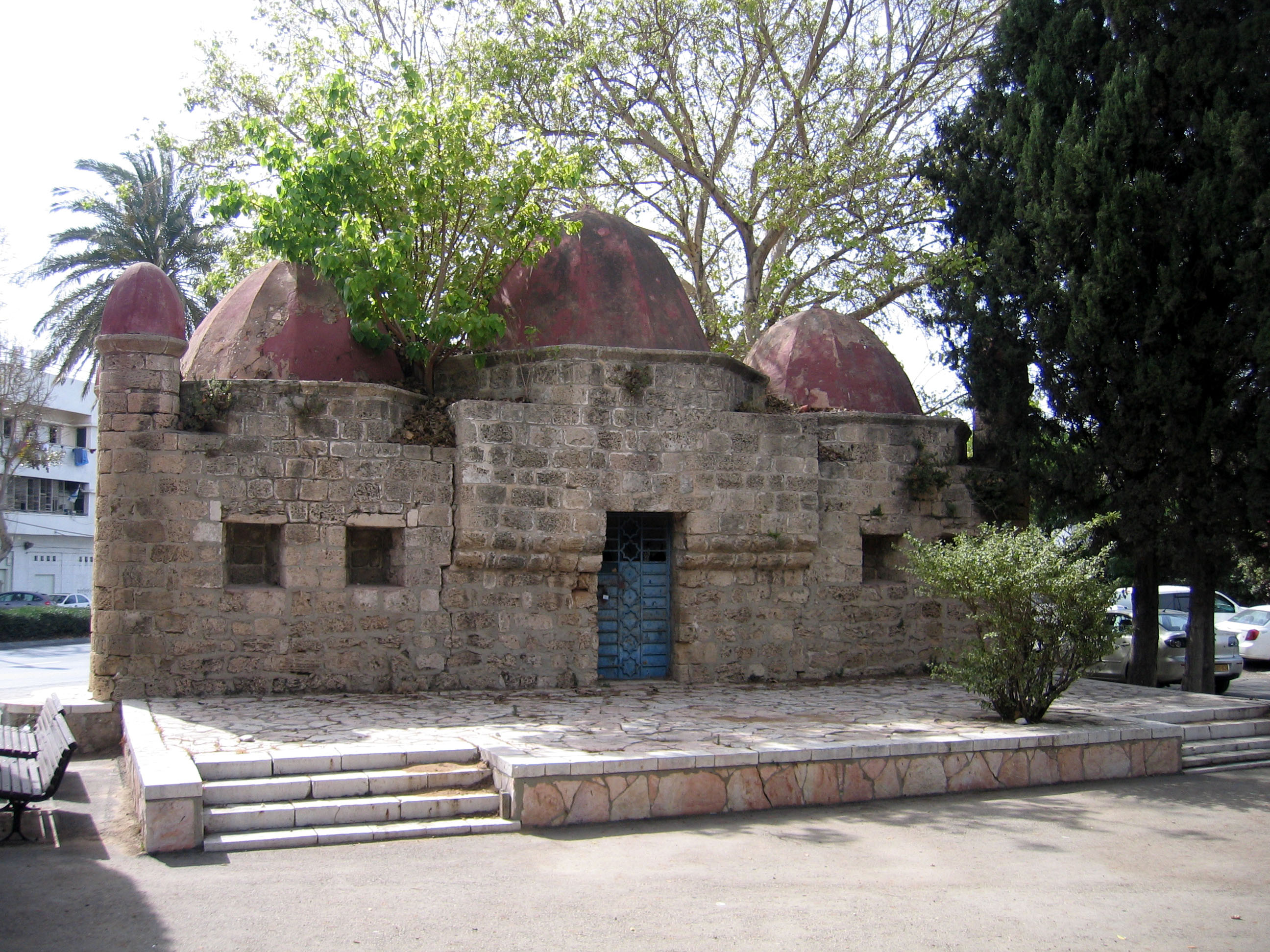
Sabil Abu Nabbut, east face.

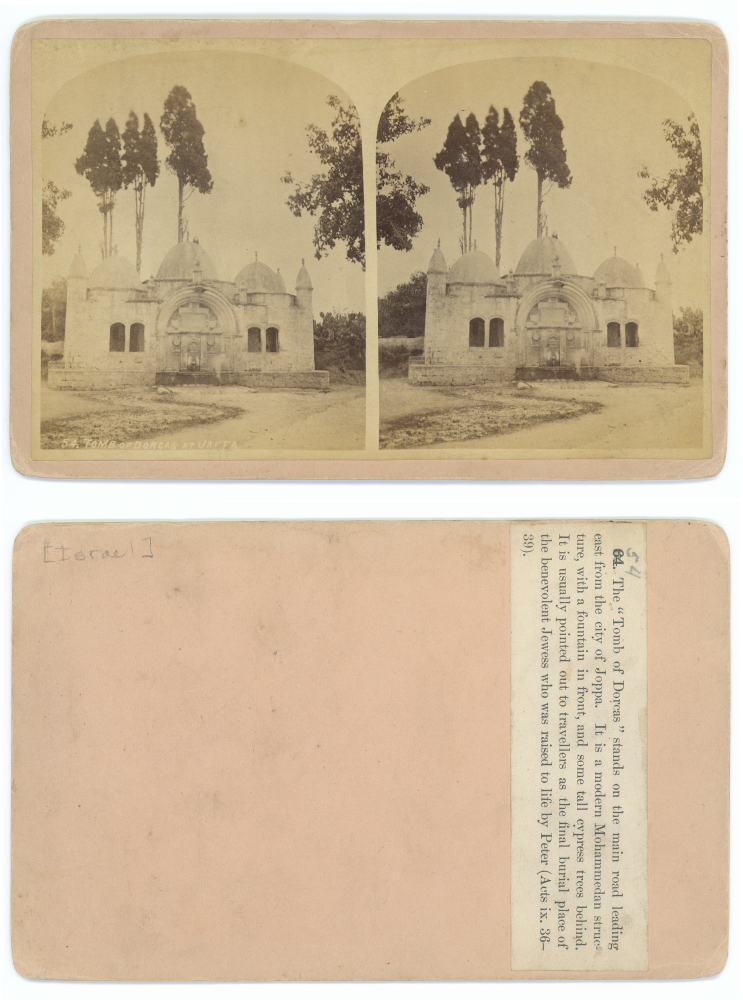
Photo of the fountain, presented as the "Tomb of Dorcas" (stereo card from c. 1900)

The sabil was built by the Governor of Jaffa, Muhammad Abu Nabbut in about 1815. It was intended to facilitate the journey between Jaffa and Jerusalem, and was part of Abu Nabbut's rehabilitation efforts in the city. It was seen by numerous travelers, merchants and pilgrims on their journey between the two cities.

Despite the fame of the sabil, very little is known about its origin and design. During inquiries in Jaffa in the 1870s, Clermont-Ganneau encountered a master mason named Ali Sida of whom he wrote: "This man, now of advanced age, directed all the works that were set on foot at the beginning of the century by the legendary Abu Nabbut, Governor of Jaffa, the same that gave his name to the pretty fountain, or Sebil Abu Nabbut..."

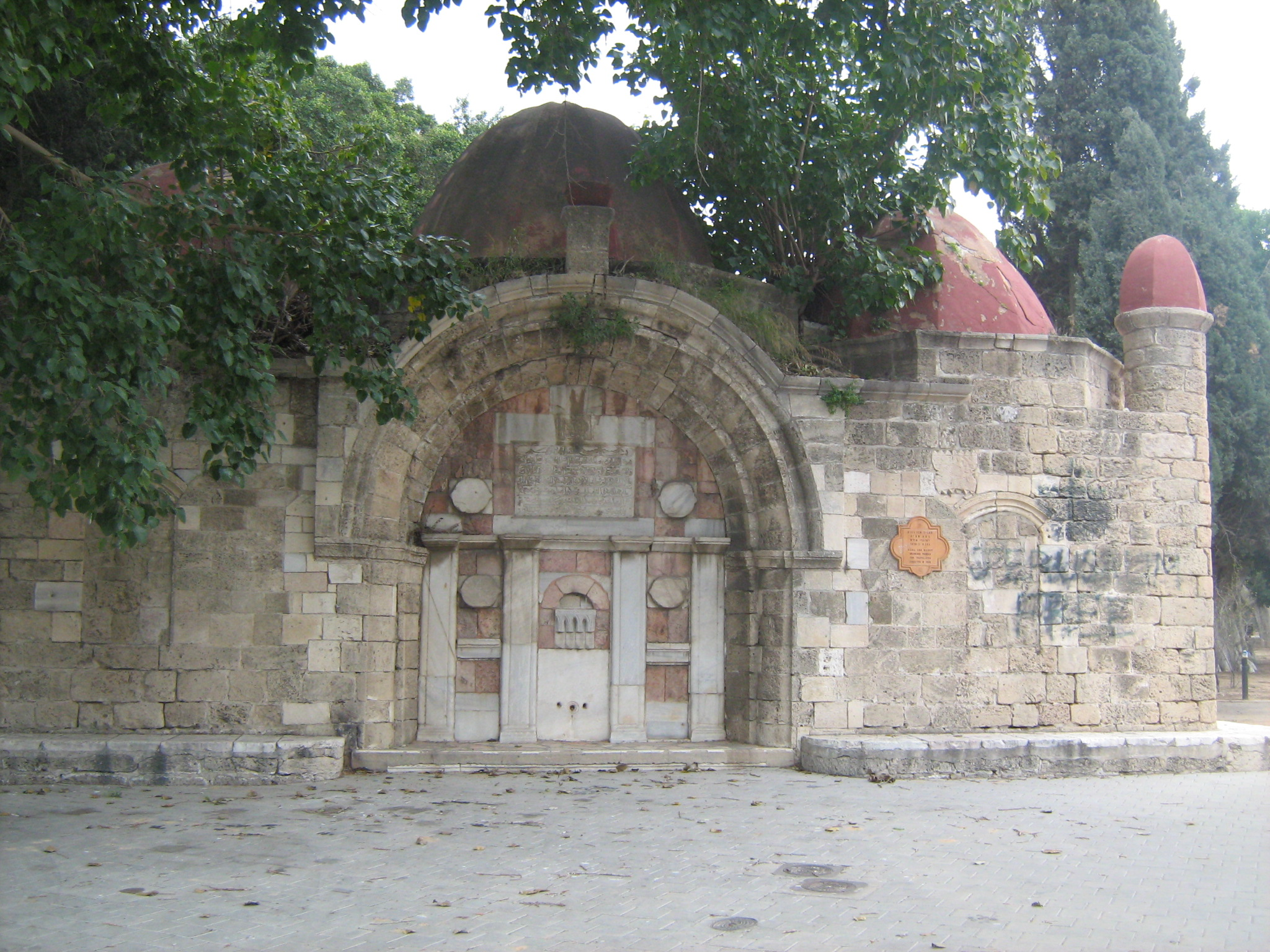
Detail of west face, with inscription over the fountain, and blocked-up windows

The building is a small rectangular stone structure with three domes with a sabil (fountain) in the middle. At each corner of the building is a cylindrical pier with projecting domed finials (now missing). The principal building material is kurkar stone, with some reused limestone blocks incorporated into the masonry, and marble used for decoration.

The principal façade of the sabil is its western side, with the fountain contained within a large shallow niche framed with cyma reversa moulding. The fountain is surrounded by four white flat marble columns set against a background of red marble. Above the two central columns is a plaque commemorating the construction of the sabil in 1236 H (1815–1816 CE). On either side of the sabil are windows. These windows were blocked up in about 1960. There are three-ridged domes that crown the building, as well as the multitude of finials on the domes and the small pinnacles that refine the building's silhouette.

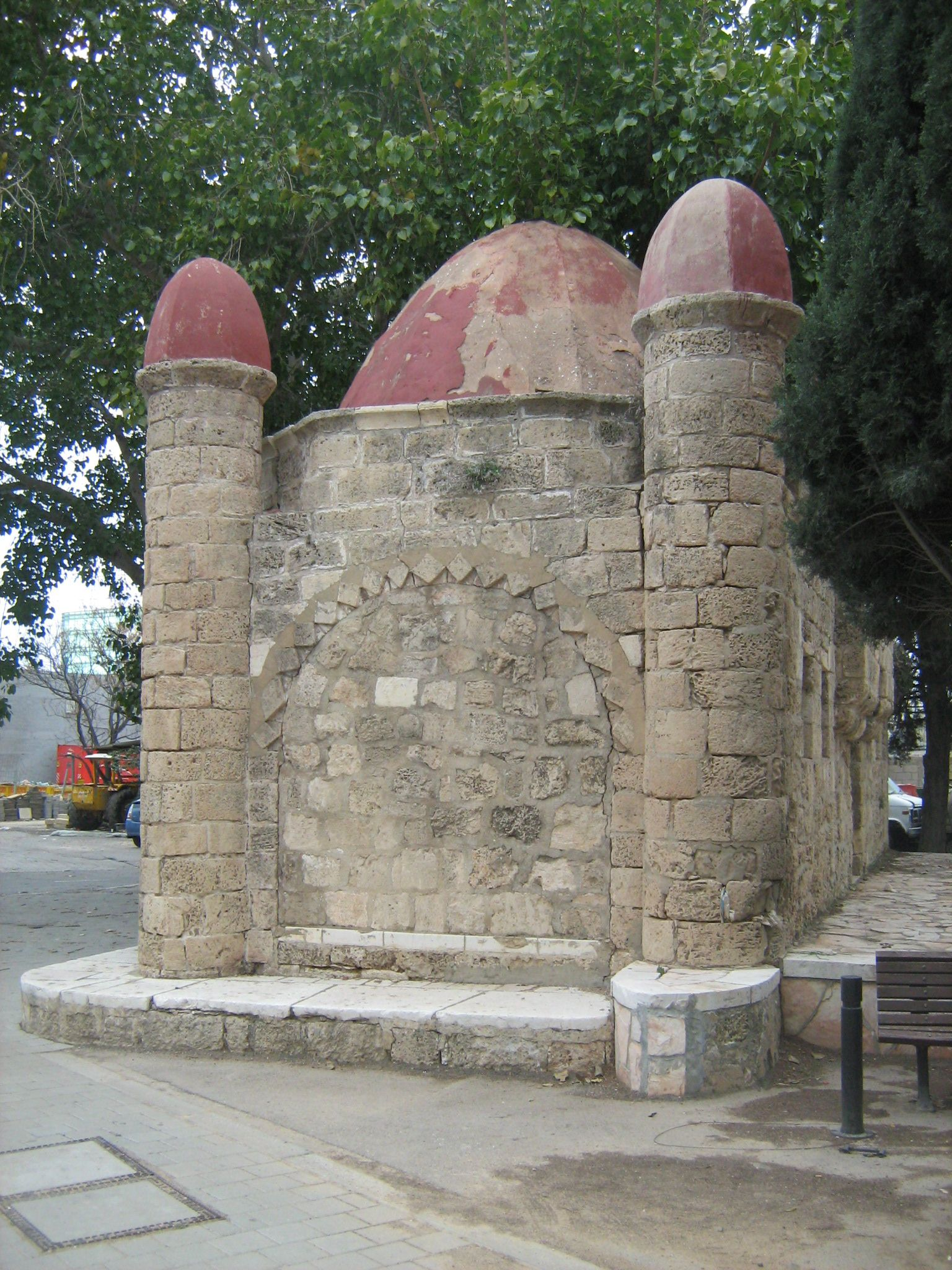
Detail of side

The entrances are at the north and south sides of the building. Although now blocked, each entrance had an open iwan facing outwards. The arches are decorated with a band containing diamond-shaped lozenges.

The east side has a pair of windows, now blocked. In the centre of the east side is a doorway opening into the domed room at the back of the sabil. The interior of this room is undecorated, and is now used as a park keeper's hut.

== "Tomb of Tabitha/Dorcas" ==
The fountain was pointed out to Western travellers as the "Tomb of Dorcas" (aka Tabitha, a New Testament figure), or more precisely as a Muslim fountain built at the burial place of Tabitha/Dorcas, as shown for instance by the caption of a photo taken around 1900 (see photo).

== Sculpture garden ==
In 2000 a sculpture garden by the Israeli painter and sculptor Yigal Tumarkin was established next to the sabil.

== Bibliography ==
- Clermont-Ganneau, C.S. (1896). [ARP] Archaeological Researches in Palestine 1873-1874, translated from the French by J. McFarlane. Vol. 2. London: Palestine Exploration Fund. Cited in Petersen, (2001).
- Kana`an, Ruba (2001), Waqf, Architecture, and Political Self-Fashioning: The Construction of the Great Mosque of Jaffa by Muhammad Aga Abu Nabbut. In Muqarnas XVIII: An Annual on Islamic Art and Architecture. Gülru Necipoglu (ed.). Leiden: E.J. Brill. (.htlm link)
- Kark, R. Jaffa: A city in Evolution 1799-1917. Jerusalem: Yad Izhak Ben-Zvi Press. (Cited in Petersen, (2001))
- Palmer, E.H. (1881). The Survey of Western Palestine: Arabic and English Name Lists Collected During the Survey by Lieutenants Conder and Kitchener, R. E. Transliterated and Explained by E.H. Palmer. Committee of the Palestine Exploration Fund.
- Petersen, Andrew (2001). A Gazetteer of Buildings in Muslim Palestine (British Academy Monographs in Archaeology). Vol. 1. Oxford University Press. ISBN 978-0-19-727011-0.
