= Herzl =

Herzl is both a given name and a surname. Notable people with the name include:

Given name:

- Herzl Berger
- Herzl Bodinger
- Herzl Rosenblum
- Herzl Yankl Tsam
- Herzl "Herzi" Halevi

Surname:

- Ludwig Herzl
- Sigmund Herzl
- Theodor Herzl

== See also ==
- Mount Herzl
- Herzl (play), 1976 Broadway play
