= Hadassah Froman =

Israeli peace activist

- הדסה פרומן
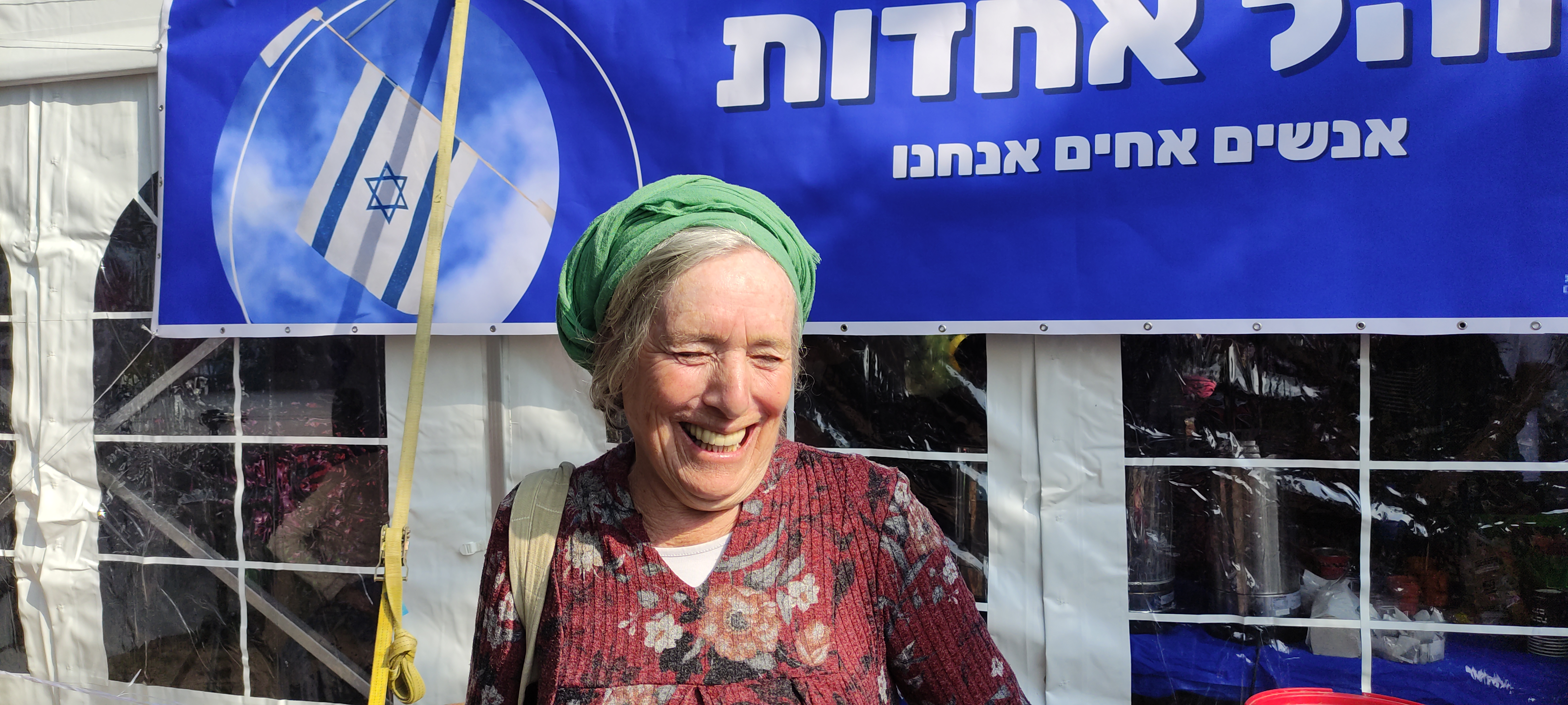
- Froman in 2023
- Education: Hebrew University of Jerusalem
- Spouse: Menachem Froman
- Children: 10

Hadassah Froman (Hebrew: הדסה פרומן) is an Israeli peace activist.

== Early life and education ==
Froman was raised in Lavi, a kibbutz in the Galilee, in an Orthodox Jewish family with right-wing politics.

After serving in the army of the Israel Defense Forces, Froman attended Hebrew University, where she studied education.

== Career ==
Froman primarily teaches Zohar, but in the past has worked both as a schoolteacher and as an adult educator.

== Activism ==
Froman is a religious Zionist, and believes that the presence of Arabs in Israel-Palestine indicates that God wants the Jewish people to coexist with them.

Froman and her husband, Menachem Froman, began their activism following the onset of the First Intifada in 1987. Hadassah was the first of the two to feel sympathetic towards the Palestinians, telling her husband, "They throw stones because they want contact with us". Although Menachem initially dismissed this idea, he eventually also developed a sympathetic point of view.

Froman became involved with Roots after being approached by one of its founders, Ali Abu Awaad. In late 2015, the 15-year-old son of a Palestinian Roots member was arrested and charged with throwing stones. Froman spoke in favor of the teenager during his trial, and raised money for his legal fees.

In January 2016, Froman's pregnant daughter-in-law was non-fatally stabbed by a Palestinian teenager. Froman called for a coexistence in an interview shortly afterward with Army Radio, and she called on Israel to make more of an effort to support Palestinians who supported coexistence with Israel. She also criticized delaying the return of Palestinian terrorists' bodies to their families, and the demolition of those families' homes.

Froman was profiled in the 2022 book, Profiles in Peace.

== Personal life ==
Froman and her husband had ten children. As of 2022, she has 50 grandchildren.

She currently lives in Tekoa, an Israeli settlement in the West Bank.
