= Menachem Froman =

Israeli Orthodox Jewish rabbi

Rabbi Menachem Froman
- מנחם פרומן
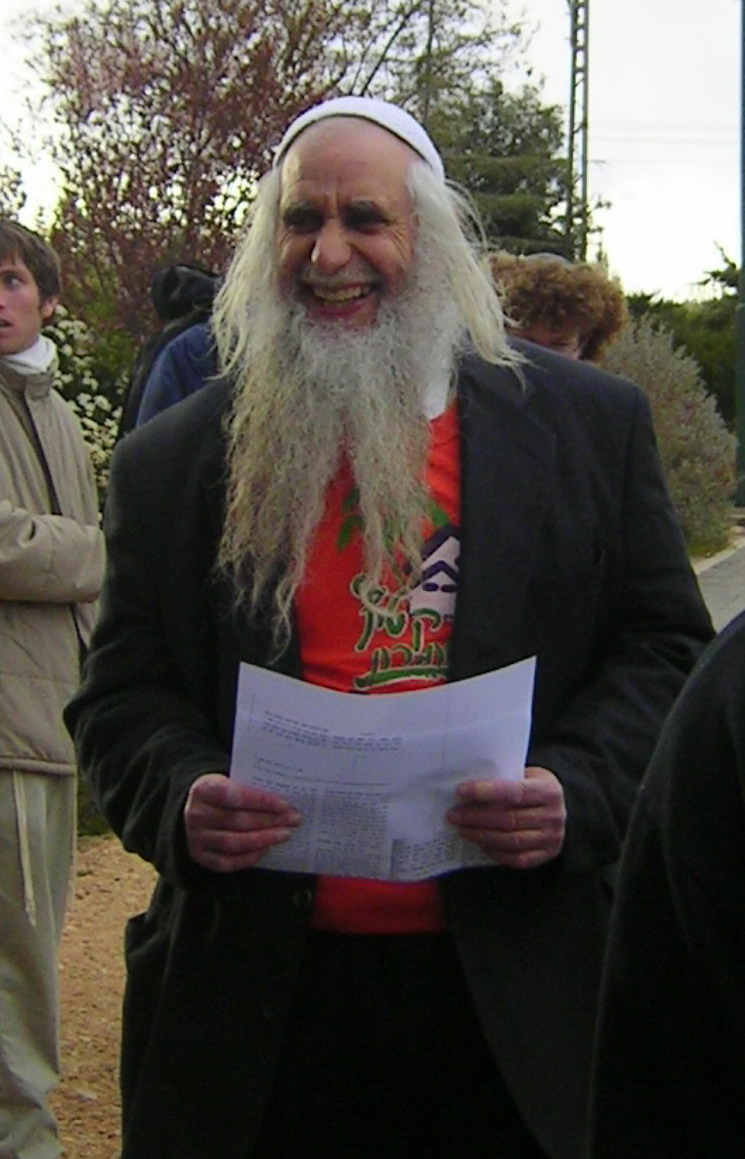
- Born: 1 June 1945; Galilee, Mandatory Palestine
- Died: 4 March 2013 (aged 67); Tekoa, West Bank
- Occupations: Rabbi; Educator; Negotiator
- Known for: Interfaith dialogue, including with PLO and Hamas members
- Spouse: Hadassah Froman
- Children: 10

Rabbi Menachem Froman (also spelled Menahem and Fruman; Hebrew: מנחם פרומן; 1 June 1945 – 4 March 2013) was an Israeli Orthodox rabbi, and a peacemaker and negotiator with close ties to Palestinian religious leaders. A founding member of Gush Emunim, he served as the chief rabbi of Tekoa in the West Bank. He was well known for promoting and leading interfaith dialogue between Jews, Christians and Muslims, focusing on using religion as a tool and source for recognizing the humanity and dignity of all people. Together with a Palestinian journalist close to Hamas, Rabbi Froman drafted a ceasefire agreement between Israel and the Hamas government in the Gaza Strip, known as the Froman-Amayreh Agreement. The agreement was endorsed by the Hamas government, but it did not receive any official response from the Israeli government.

== Career ==
Froman, a former Israeli paratrooper who took part in the 1967 capture of the Western Wall, was a student at the Mercaz haRav and Yeshivat HaKotel yeshivas. He was among the founders of the Gush Emunim settlement movement and supported the establishment of Jewish settlements in the West Bank and Gaza Strip. He obtained rabbinical ordination from Rabbis Shlomo Goren and Avraham Shapira and then became the rabbi of Migdal Oz, a settlement in the Gush Etzion area. He was Chief Rabbi of the Knesset. He taught at several yeshivas, including Ateret Cohanim and Machon Meir, and was a lecturer at the Tekoa Yeshiva and Otniel hesder Yeshiva.

== Views and ideologies ==
=== Interfaith meetings and dialogue ===
Froman was involved in interfaith dialogue with Palestinians and Muslims and participated in informal negotiations with many Palestinian leaders as he argued that peacemaking efforts between Israelis and Palestinians must include the religious sectors of both societies. Froman conducted meetings with controversial Palestinian leaders, including with the late PLO Chairman and President of Palestinian National Authority Yasser Arafat, and the Hamas leaders Sheikh Ahmad Yassin and Mahmoud Al-Zahar. Froman had close ties with Palestinian leaders, as evidenced by a letter he sent to Palestinian President Mahmoud Abbas about his last conversation with Yasser Arafat:

I remember my last conversation with him, close to his death, when he answered me with emotion: "You are my brother!" and of course it is possible to explain his emotion, that he wanted to tell me, close to his death, that the two nations – the Israelis and the Palestinians – are brothers, that if the fate of one improves so does the fate of its double. The president customarily would thank me for these blessings and would order that these blessings be publicized in the Palestinian newspapers so that the Palestinian nation will know that there are Jewish rabbis who are blessing them with blessings of peace.

After the election of the Hamas government in the Gaza Strip, Froman stepped up his efforts to organize meetings between Israeli and Palestinian religious leaders. He met and conducted negotiations with current Hamas leader Mahmoud al-Zahar and Hamas's Minister for Jerusalem Affairs, Sheikh Mahmoud Abu Tir, with the goal of drafting a ceasefire agreement that will end the killings in Gaza and the West Bank and lift the blockade imposed by Israel on the Gaza Strip.

=== Froman–Amayreh Agreement (2008) ===
In February 2008, Froman reached a proposed agreement with Khaled Amayreh, a journalist close to Hamas, for an Israeli-Hamas ceasefire in the Gaza Strip that would put an immediate end to all Palestinian attacks against Israeli civilians or soldiers, facilitate the release of abducted Israeli soldier Gilad Shalit, and end the Israeli siege of the Gaza Strip. Senior Hamas officials have endorsed the agreement proposal. The Israeli government, however, did not respond to this initiative, effectively rejecting it.

Froman drafted the agreement proposal with Amayreh after meeting with him over the course of several months. The paper was finalized and shown to Hamas leaders in Gaza, and Hamas leader-in-exile Khaled Mashal, who approved of it. The proposal was also submitted to the Israeli government but according to Froman, the Israeli government never responded to it. The efforts of Froman and Amayreh to meet with Israeli government officials were rebuffed.

The proposal called for Israel to lift economic sanctions imposed on the Gaza Strip and open all border crossings. The cease-fire agreement included the release of abducted Israeli soldier Gilad Shalit, and a gradual release of Palestinian prisoners. The Israel Defense Forces would have ended "all hostile activities toward the Gaza Strip, including targeted killings, the setting of ambushes, aerial bombardments and all penetrations into Gazan territory, in addition to ending the arrest, detention and persecution of Palestinians in the Strip."

The Palestinians would have been obligated "to take all the necessary steps to completely end the attacks against Israel", including stopping "indefinitely all rocket attacks on Israel", assaults "on Israeli civilians and soldiers" and "to impose a cease-fire on all groups, factions, and individuals operating in the Strip."

Along with Amayreh, Froman said that even if the attempt turned out to be a mere academic exercise, its elements could be used by the Jerusalem and Gaza governments. It did not, for example, include the recognition by Hamas of the State of Israel, instead "recognizing that there are Jews living in the Holy Land", according to Froman, thus overcoming an obstacle that has long been a deal-breaker.

=== Importance of religion in the peace process ===
Froman lamented the early 21st century violence in Israel and the Palestinian territories, and laid partial blame for the failure of the Oslo Accords on the tendency of Israeli and Palestinian secular negotiators to ignore and marginalize religion and religious leaders in the peace process:

Ahmad Yassin told me about the Oslo Accords that they were an agreement between our heretics and your heretics to subdue religion. The Oslo Accords collapsed because the PLO could not control the other forces. Hamas has the power to enforce agreements to end violence. Even Arafat could not control and enforce agreements on murderous units in his organization and in Hamas. But if Hamas has a strong enough interest for a ceasefire, they can enforce it. It's not easy, because in the Palestinian society there are many groups and resistance committees, and also plain underworld figures. But if there will be a coalition with the PLO and Hamas to achieve a ceasefire, the chances of ending the shooting of Qassam rockets on Sderot are much better. Our primary goal should be achieving a ceasefire, and to reach that goal the politicians need to negotiate with politicians, and the rabbis negotiate with the religious leaders.

=== Jerusalem – a shared capital ===
Froman supported making Jerusalem (the capital of Israel, also claimed by the Palestinians as their capital) the religious capital of all three monotheistic faiths. In November 1999, he participated in a conference with dozens of international religious leaders, including the Dalai Lama. In his 2005 letter to Palestinian President Mahmoud Abbas, Froman cited examples from Jewish tradition of the importance of sharing Jerusalem between all 3 religions and turning it into a city of peace:

From the difficult experience of the shared history of the two nations – the Israel nation and the Palestinian nation – we can learn one important thing – between two brothers – when one's fate is bad, the fate is also bad of the second. Only when it is good for one, it will be, with God's help, good for its double. Little Jewish children know the famous story (the hadith) of the man who came to the head of the Jewish Sages and asked him to teach him the principle of the Jewish religion while he was standing on one foot (in one sentence). The Sage taught him, "Love your neighbor exactly how you would love yourself...From this hadith, which summarized the main principle of our religion, it's possible to learn that just as Jews have obtained a free and thriving state from Allah the Exalted, respected in the world, and just as we obtained from Allah the Exalted a state with Jerusalem as its capital, our neighbor will also obtain a state with its capital as Jerusalem. If both nations will be fortunate to stone the Cursed Satan who stimulates war and hate, and establish Jerusalem as a capital of peace of Israel and Palestine, there will be, God willing, Jerusalem the Capital of Peace for the whole world!

=== Coexistence under Palestinian sovereignty ===
Froman opposed the forced eviction of Jewish settlers from their homes in the settlements in the West Bank, and advocated that the State of Israel withdraw from the West Bank and Gaza, yet leave the settlements and Israeli/Jewish residents in place under Palestinian sovereignty. He claimed that, if Israel withdraws from Tekoa and most residents leave, he will nonetheless stay because of his love of the Land of Israel:

But what matters is the holiness of this land. I prefer to live here in a future Palestine than leave to live in an Israeli state.

He was a strong opponent of Israel's unilateral disengagement from Gaza. In August 2005, prior to the implementation of the disengagement plan, he moved with his family to Ganei Tal in Gush Katif in order to show support for the residents being evicted.

Froman supported the Palestinian Authority's efforts to attain statehood recognition at the United Nations on 20 September 2011, and said that the establishment of the Palestinian state will benefit the peace process and Israel.

== Personal life ==
Froman was born in 1945 in Galilee, Mandate Palestine. He was married to educator and artist Hadassah Froman, and the couple had 10 children.

Upon being diagnosed with colorectal cancer in 2010, Froman declared that he would add "Hai Shalom" (living peace) to his last name and re-dedicate his life to peace and coexistence between Jews and Palestinians. Despite treatment by both conventional and natural means, he died on the evening of 4 March 2013, at the age of 67. His funeral in Tekoa on 5 March 2013, lasting 4 hours, was filled with music and poetry, and was attended by thousands of people of all political and religious ideologies.

== Legacy ==
Froman was memorialized by Peace Now, a left-wing advocacy group, as well as by David Perl, council head of Gush Etzion. Rabbi Re'em Ha'Cohen, dean of the Otniel yeshiva, delivered a lengthy eulogy in his honor, entitled "a holy man was in our beth midrash."

Froman's activism, bringing religious settlers in the West Bank into contact with their Palestinian neighbors, has been continued in part by his student Rabbi Hanan Schlesinger and his organization Roots – Judur – Shorashim.

== Works ==
Froman did not publish any of his own books during his lifetime. Posthumously, his teachings have been collected in several volumes:

- Soḥaki Aretz: Shalom, Am, Adama) [lit. "Playing of the Land: Peace, People, Earth"] (Yedioth, 2014)
- Ḥasidim Tzoḥakim Mi-Zeh [lit. "Hasidim (pious ones or adherents) laugh at this"] (Dabri Shir, 2015)
  - Translated as: Chasidim Just Laugh (Deuteronomy Press, 2025)
- Tein Li Z'man [lit. "give me time"] (Koren, 2017)
- Ha-Adam Hu K'mo Ḥayat [lit. "Man is like a tailor"] (Dabri Shir, 2020)

== See also ==
- Hadassah Froman

Teachers/Influences:

- Abraham Isaac Kook
- Zvi Yehuda Kook
- Yehuda Getz
- Mordechai Yosef Leiner
- Nachman of Breslov
- Shimon bar Yochai

Colleagues/Partners:

- Shimon Gershon Rosenberg
- Adin Steinsaltz
- Yasser Arafat
- Ahmed Yassin
- Mahmoud Abbas
- Ehud Banai

Students/Admirers

- Hanan Schlesinger
- Yossi Klein Halevi
- Shaul Magid
- Re'em Ha'Cohen
