= Tzvi Hersh Weinreb =

American rabbi and psychotherapist

Religious life
- Religion: Judaism
- Denomination: Orthodox

Jewish leader
- Successor: Steven Weil
- Position: Executive Vice President Emeritus
- Organization: Orthodox Union
- Semikhah: Rabbi Jacob Joseph Yeshiva

Tzvi Hersh Weinreb (born February 23, 1940) is an American ordained rabbi and psychotherapist who is the Executive Vice President Emeritus of the Orthodox Union, the largest Orthodox Jewish organisation in North America; a position he has held since 2002. Weinreb serves as the Editor-in-Chief of the Koren Talmud Bavli with commentary by Adin Steinsaltz.

== Rabbinic ordination and education ==
He received his rabbinic ordination from the Rabbi Jacob Joseph Yeshiva in New York. He received his master's degree in Psychology from the New School for Social Research, and earned his PhD from the University of Maryland. For 13 years he was the rabbi at Congregation Shomrei Emunah in Baltimore. He served on the Rabbinic Cabinet of United Jewish Communities, on the Executive Committee of the Rabbinical Council of America, and on the boards of various other organizational and educational institutions.

== Career ==
In what Weinreb calls a "life changing phone call", the Lubavitcher Rebbe, Rabbi Menachem Mendel Schneerson, responded to Weinreb's (anonymous) request for advice at a critical point in his life, that he consult with "A Jew in Maryland, whose name is Weinreb." Upon revealing to Schneerson that he himself was Rabbi Weinreb, the Rebbe replied that "sometimes one must consult with oneself." This piece of advice was regarded by Weinreb as highly invigorating and empowering.

Weinreb is a widely regarded scholar on the subject of domestic violence which helped contributed to his appointment following the Baruch Lanner debacle.

Although the presidency of the OU is a leadership position, Weinreb acted as the official chief executive officer of the organization. In early 2007 it was announced that he was to step down from his position, however in an interview with The Forward he made it clear that this was not of his own choice, and following pressure he was asked to retain his position until 2009. In 2009, Weinreb was named Executive-Vice President, Emeritus and Steven Weil was named as his successor. In July 2009, Weil transitioned in and assumed the position of Executive Vice President.

During a fact-finding mission to Israel, he came under armed fire in Sderot in May 2007.

== Views ==
He is considered an Orthodox centrist.

In 2005, he noted with great sadness the passing of Pope John Paul II.
