= The Talmud: The Steinsaltz Edition =

The Steinsaltz Edition Talmud originally began as a Hebrew edition of the Babylonian Talmud by Rabbi Adin Steinsaltz, with his literal Hebrew translation of the Talmud along with his elucidation and commentary. The Hebrew translation started in 1965 and was completed in late 2010. The Hebrew edition contains the standard text of the Talmud with vowels and punctuation in the middle of the page. The margins contain the standard Rashi and tosafot commentaries, as well as Steinsaltz's own translation of the Talmud text into modern Hebrew with his elucidation. Steinsaltz has also recently published an electronic version of the Hebrew edition on DVD.

Between 1989 and 1999 Random House published a small number of volumes in English, and a new printing by Koren Publishers Jerusalem began to re-release volumes in 2012, including an edition with full-color illustrations.

== Koren Talmud Bavli ==
In May 2012, Koren launched the Koren Talmud Bavli, a bilingual edition of the Talmud with translation and commentary by Rabbi Adin Steinsaltz and designed by Raphaël Freeman. Based on Rabbi Steinsaltz's original Hebrew commentary on the Talmud, the layout features side-by-side English/Aramaic translation, maps, diagrams, and explanatory notes. Rabbi Tzvi Hersh Weinreb serves as the Editor-in-Chief of the Koren Talmud Bavli. Rabbi Shalom Z. Berger serves as Senior Content Editor.

== Praise ==
The English-edition project was hailed by Commentary Magazine as "a landmark in making the text accessible to the millions of Jews whose native (and often only) tongue is English." Subsequently, the Jewish Book Council named the Koren Talmud Bavli a 2012 National Jewish Book Award winner in the category of Modern Jewish Thought and Experience. Rabbi Gil Student praised the Koren edition precisely on account of it providing less extensive elaboration than the Schottenstein Talmud, asserting that a text which "keeps elaboration to the minimum required to understand the text" along with a comparatively restrained commentary are both characteristics which stem from an approach "intended to avoid distracting from the text."

== Criticism ==
The English Koren Talmud has been criticized as having inaccurate scientific information, such as identifying Ursa Major as a star and describing polycythemia vera as a disease causing excessive bleeding from the gums and from ordinary cuts. Rabbi Dr. Marc Shapiro, a known critic of ArtScroll, has criticized the Koren Talmud as always coming out below ArtScroll's edition in his experience and expressed "I don’t know why anyone would prefer it over ArtScroll." Rabbi Leib Zalesch, Judaic Studies Teacher at Beth Tfiloh Dahan Community School, characterized the Koren Talmud as coming across "like a cheap ArtScroll knockoff" due to lacking a well-organized structure that clearly conveys the flow and narrative of the Talmud, and being "void of any notion of its user being guided gently through the Talmudic jungle by an experienced guide or teacher." Zalesch further argued that the Koren edition contains "non-research masquerading as valuable information" and that "Steinsaltz is your perpetually annoying seventh grade classmate, always quick with a brainy but irrelevant factoid."

Jacob Neusner's How Adin Steinsaltz Misrepresents the Talmud. Four False Propositions from his "Reference Guide" (1998) displays strong disagreement.

The Hebrew edition of the Steinsaltz Talmud was the target of fierce opposition in much of the Orthodox world, with many leading rabbis such as Elazar Shach, Yosef Shalom Eliashiv, and Eliezer Waldenberg harshly condemning it. Much of the criticism was not focused on the Hebrew Talmud translation but stemmed from other works of Steinsaltz and, by extension, Steinsaltz's general worldview. Waldenberg wrote that when The Essential Talmud and Biblical Images (Hebrew: "דמויות מן המקרא" ו"תלמוד לכל") were brought before him, he was shocked to see the way in which Steinsaltz described the Patriarchs and Talmudic sages, as well as his approach to the Oral Torah. Waldenberg further wrote that these works had the power to "poison the souls" of those who read them.

== See also ==
- Talmud § Translations
