= Shimon Gershon Rosenberg =

Israeli rabbi and educator

Rabbi Shimon Gershon Rosenberg (Shagar)
- שמעון גרשון רוזנברג
- Born: 13 November 1949; Jerusalem, Israel
- Died: 11 June 2007 (aged 57); Jerusalem, Israel
- Resting place: Har HaZeitim
- Other name: HaRav Shagar
- Education: Yeshivat Kerem B'Yavneh, Mercaz HaRav, Yeshivat HaKotel
- Occupations: yeshiva dean and religious thinker
- Spouse: Miriam

Rabbi Shimon Gershon Rosenberg, (Hebrew: שמעון גרשון רוזנברג; 13 November 1949 – 11 June 2007), known by the acronym הרב שג"ר HaRav Shagar, was a Torah scholar and a religious postmodern thinker. His thought was characterized by Neo-Hasidism and postmodernism. In 1996 he established, together with Rabbi Yair Dreifuss, Yeshivat Siach Yitzchak, in Jerusalem. The yeshiva later moved to Givat HaDagan in Efrat and HaRav Shagar remained the head of the establishment until his death.

== Biography ==
Rosenberg was born and raised in Jerusalem, to Shalom Zelig and his wife, both Transylvanian Holocaust survivors. He learned in the grade school Neve Etzion in the neighborhood of Bayit Vegan, and continued his studies in the Netiv Meir high school and in the Hesder yeshiva Yeshivat Kerem B'Yavneh. In 1973 he began to learn in Mercaz HaRav Kook, as well as with Rabbi Shlomo Fisher and kabbalists. In the same year he married Miriam Ziv. After his wedding, he began studying in the Kollel of Yeshivat HaKotel. He received his nickname "Shagar" in high school when one of his teachers saw the initials of his name on his Tallit bag and began to refer to him humorously as "Shagar."

Rosenberg was badly injured during the Yom Kippur War in the tank battles in the Golan Heights. His tank took a direct hit and two of his comrades - fellow students in yeshiva - were killed instantly. He himself was badly burnt and was rescued with great difficulty. After recovering from his injuries, he returned to his yeshiva studies. He was awarded rabbinical ordination in 1976.

In the 1980s he was a dominant figure and teacher in Yeshivat HaKotel and even filled in for one year for the head of the yeshiva, Rabbi Yeshayahu Hadari (when Rabbi Hadari took a sabbatical). The uniting of a group of students around him led to internal politics, and he left his position as a lecturer at the yeshiva. In 1984 he established the higher yeshiva "Shefa." Heading the yeshiva together with him were Rabbi Adin Steinsaltz and Rabbi Menachem Froman. A group of his students from Yeshivat HaKotel came with him to the new yeshiva. In a later stage, the yeshiva helped establish the high school Makor Haim. Yeshivat Shefa closed with his leaving in 1988.

In 1989 he served for one year as head of the Beth Midrash Ma'ale - the Center for Religious Zionism, together with Rabbi Yoel Bin-Nun and Professor Shalom Rosenberg. In 1990 Professor Benjamin Ish-Shalom established the Beit Midrash of Beit Morasha and appointed HaRav Shagar to lead it together with Rabbi Eliyahu Blomenzweig. At the end of 1996, he established Yeshivat Siach Yitzchak together with Rabbi Yair Dreyfus. He was the head of this yeshiva until his death. During this time he also functioned as the head of the Beit Midrash "Uri" for women and taught women at the Midrasha at Bar-Ilan University, Nishmat and Midreshet Lindenbaum. He lived in Kiryat Moshe in Jerusalem. He was married and had six children.

In February 2007, he was diagnosed with pancreatic cancer. This forced him to leave the yeshiva to undergo treatment. He and his wife moved to the moshav Givat Yeshayahu, actualizing a dream of many years. He handed over his writings to his friend and fellow yeshiva dean, Rabbi Yair Dreyfus, to prepare them for publication. On 21 May 2007, an institute was established to publish his writings. HaRav Shagar died a month later, on the 25th of Sivan 2007, and was buried in the Mount of Olives Jewish Cemetery.

In 2012, Rabbi Mordechai Verdi produced a movie about Rabbi Shagar, entitled "To Chase After the Shadow."

== Thought and perception ==
Shagar was a spiritual figure with origins in the thought of Religious Zionism, particularly that of Rabbi Abraham Isaac Kook. His book Broken Vessels: Torah and Religious Zionism in Postmodernity was an attempt to provide a religious response to postmodern trends in today's world, asserting that they can be included within a Torah worldview. He accepted some postmodern claims and identified in them ideas and contents that appear in Kabbalah and Hasidism. He claimed that specifically the Deconstruction, that he identified as the "breaking of the vessels" as found in Kabbalah, opens a religious option for people, as it gives one the ability to freely create his religious world. This stance brought much criticism from those who saw postmodernism as alien to Judaism and opposed allowing this philosophy into the Beit Midrash.

According to Shagar, optimism is a giving up and escape from accepting life as it is. He doesn't hide that his own faith is that which leaves room for spiritual questioning, and in light of this, he sometimes reformulates central traditional beliefs. He saw this as part of the progress and improvement of religious devices seeing their flexibility (breaking the vessels), as he portrays in his book Broken Vessels.

Shagar's understanding emphasizes the individual-spiritual aspect of life in Israel, and not just the national aspect that was often stressed in the Religious Zionist movement. In his view, yeshiva students must learn to integrate every aspect of their lives into their religious worldview and practice, and not only the army or their professional lives. Shagar encouraged his students to engage in the arts, and he himself wrote and published poetry. In his teachings and writing, he drew heavily upon Hasidic teachings, as do most of his close students.

In 2005, against the background of Israel's unilateral disengagement plan, he signed, together with many rabbis from the Religious Zionist denomination, a public letter opposing the plan. He did, however, express clear opposition to soldiers' disobeying of orders.

Shagar actively participated in the B'Magale Tzedek organization. In the political spectrum, he opposed withdrawing from Samaria and Judea. At the same time, he recognized the "Messianic Occupation" and the firm need to make peace. He said of himself, "I don't define myself as a rightist or leftist, rather as a pragmatist."

As a continuation of historiosophy from the school of Rabbi Abraham Isaac Kook, in his sermons for Independence Day "On this Day," Rabbi Shagar identified the development of Israeli democracy as a multicultural and multi-national democracy to be the next stage in the redemptive process. Multiculturalism and multi-nationalism are for him an entry for a mystic consciousness to contain plurality and division. Because of this, he wished for the breaking of the binary thinking between the left and right in Israeli discourse.

== Students and influence ==
His books and his ideas are mostly in the area of new Hasidism developing in the Religious Zionist community. His books are studied mostly in the yeshivas that are thought to be more progressive, and his thought has not extensively broken into the nucleus of the Religious Zionist yeshivas. His language and areas he dealt with have gained appreciation from academic and artistic institutions, and many of his students engage in these areas.

The publication in 2017 of a collection of his essays in English, Faith Shattered and Restored: Judaism in the Postmodern Age (Jerusalem: Maggid Books), translated by Elie Leshem, led to much online debate and controversy. Nonetheless, it helped to widen his influence in the Modern Orthodox community in North America.

=== Students ===
- Rabbi Benni Kalmanzon, and Rabbi Amiram Olami - founder and heads of Yeshivat Otniel
- Rabbi Dov Zinger head of Yeshivat Makor Haim
- Rabbi Dr. Yehuda Brandeis head of Beit Morasha
- Rabbi Yehoshua Engelman - Rabbi of Congregation "Yakar" in Tel Aviv
- Rabbi Benny Perl, Principal of the Bar-Ilan Yeshiva High School for Arts and Sciences in Tel Aviv.
- Rabbi Ohad Teharlev - Head of the Israeli program at Midreshet Lindenbaum
- Ohed Ezrachi - Spiritual teacher and alleged sex offender.
- Rabbi Dr. Naftali Moses - Translator of Two of Rav Shagar's Books into English
- Rabbi Dr. Zvi Leshem - Director of the Scholem Collection at the National Library of Israel
- Dr. Zohar Maor - Lecturer in History at Bar-Ilan University and Editor-in-Chief of Rav Shagar's Books
- Professor Zvi Mark - Hasidic Studies at Bar-Ilan University.
- Dr. Ze'ev Kitzes - Zusah Hasidic Stories Research Project
- Rabbi Mordechai Vardi, Rabbi of Kibbutz Rosh Tzurim and head of the Screenwriting Department at the Maale Film School in Jerusalem.

== Books ==
- Rosenberg, Shimon Gershon (2017). Maor, Zohar (ed.). Faith Shattered and Restored: Judaism in the Postmodern Age. Translated by Leshem, Eli. Jerusalem: Maggid Books. ISBN 9781592644643.
- Rosenberg, Shimon Gershon (2024). Brill, Alan (ed.). Living Time, Festival Discourses For The Present Age. Translated by Morrow, Levi. Jerusalem: Maggid Books. ISBN 9781592646128.
