= Elijah Kahlenberg =

Jewish-American peace activist and political analyst

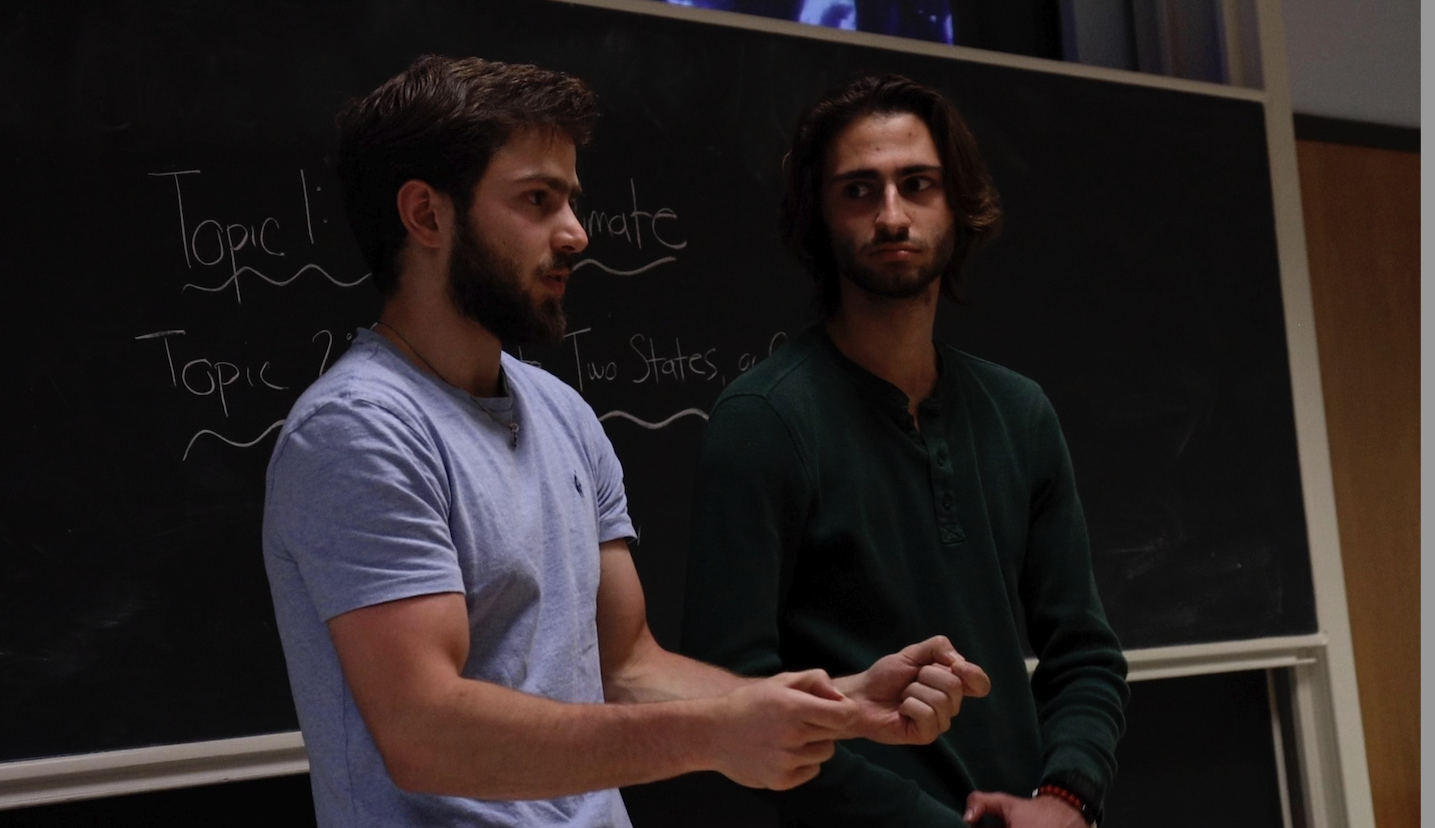
- Kahlenberg (left) in 2024
- Born: Elijah Demetrios Kahlenberg; September 28, 2002 (age 23); San Antonio, Texas, U.S.
- Education: University of Texas at Austin (BA)

Elijah Demetrios Kahlenberg (born September 28, 2002) is an American peace activist, political commentator, and founder/President of Atidna International, the first and only organization dedicated to creating joint dialogue and peace initiatives between Jewish/Israeli and Arab/Palestinian students on college campuses (not to be confused with Atidna, the Arab/Palestinian youth movement). Elijah Kahlenberg is also on the Board of Directors of Roots – Judur – Shorashim, the only organization working to bring together Jews and Arabs in the West Bank for joint initiatives promoting mutual understanding, reconciliation and nonviolence.

== Early life and education ==
Elijah Kahlenberg was born in San Antonio, Texas. His father is of Ashkenazi Jewish descent and his mother is of Greek/Sephardic Jewish descent. In regards to his Sephardic heritage, he has explored such a background by working for Diarna, a digital mapping geo-museum which collects histories of Sephardic and Mizrahi Jews primarily across North Africa, the Middle East, and the Mediterranean. He was also selected for the American Sephardic Federation’s 3rd Annual Sephardi House Cohort, a selection composed of America's rising Sephardi and Mizrahi leaders. He is also a member of the Texas Jewish Historical Society.

He has been involved in various initiatives aimed at promoting dialogue and mutual understanding from a young age between Jews, Arabs, Israelis, and Palestinians. He has stated that a personal impetus in addressing the conflict began since he was 12 when, in 2014 during and following Operation Protective Edge, he witnessed the immense destruction in Gaza as well as the ensuing vitriol between Jewish and Arab communities in Israel/Palestine and abroad. Currently, Kahlenberg is an undergraduate student and researcher at the University of Texas at Austin, where he majors in government, Middle Eastern studies, and Jewish studies.

== Activism and career ==
In April 2022, he founded Atidna International, the first and only long standing nonprofit organization dedicated to bringing together Jews/Israelis and Arabs/Palestinians in pursuit of dialogue and peace building on college campuses. Kahlenberg began the organization through leading an Atidna chapter at the University of Texas at Austin; however, Atidna has since expanded with chapters at other colleges and universities. Atidna's stated purpose is to 1) solidify that Jews and Arabs are cousins, one family, and not inherent enemies via peace events on college campuses and 2) to create joint spaces for Jews/Israelis and Arabs/Palestinians to engage in dialogue about anything and everything pertaining to Israel and Palestine. Despite sharing the word Atidna (a combination of the Hebrew word for "future" and the Arabic suffix for "our" to mean "our future"), Atidna International shares no relationship with the Atidna Association, a Zionist organization based in Israel dedicated to the integration of Palestinian citizens of Israel. Atidna International gained notable attention following various media outlets writing about the organization's joint dialogue sessions and peace events on campuses. Such initiatives included hosting one of the few joint vigils on college campuses to honor all innocents, Israelis and Palestinians, who lost their lives following Hamas’ October 7 attack and the IDF's subsequent bombardment of Gaza.

Kahlenberg also serves on the Board of Directors of Roots – Judur – Shorashim, the only organization dedicated to pursuing joint and civil initiatives in the West Bank between Israelis and Palestinians. Before joining Roots' board, Kahlenberg worked as an on-the-ground intern and volunteer for Roots at Merkaz Karama (called the Dignity Center in English), a Palestinian farm in the West Bank where Roots' joint peace initiatives are undertaken. While at Merkaz Karama, Kahlenberg was involved in various initiatives aimed at building bridges between Jewish and Palestinian communities. This included creating the first only joint basketball court in the West Bank for Israelis and Palestinians for Roots’ annual summer camp.

In addition to his work with Atidna International and Roots, Kahlenberg was active as a Jewish student in the Gaza anti-war protests sweeping college campuses in the Spring of 2024. He stated in an interview with NPR's Leila Fadel in May 2024 that he considers the Palestinian people to be "part of [his] family" and that "the Palestinian people have more in common with the Jewish people than any other people," thus concluding that "when your family is harmed, you have a duty...an obligation to stand up for them." With regards to the West's role in the Israeli-Palestinian conflict, Kahlenberg has been hyper-critical of American corporations, specifically weapons manufacturers, who have profited off of the destruction in Gaza. He has also encouraged continued dialogue and peace-building between Jewish, Arab, Israeli, and Palestinian students on campuses amid increased tensions during and following the protest movement by creating joint spaces for interaction through Atidna International for both communities.

== Awards and recognitions ==
Kahlenberg has been recognized for his commitment to public service and his efforts to promote peace, reconciliation and mutual understanding in the Middle East. In 2024, he was announced as a Truman Scholar, providing him with $30,000 for graduate studies in public service fields. He is also a recipient of the Pal-Make A Difference Award, an accolade presented annually to a UT Austin student whose individual program or initiative has made a significant contribution to campus life or the broader community. Kahlenberg was chosen for his contribution in increasing concord and cooperation between Jewish and Arab students on campus via his efforts in leading Atidna International.

== Media ==
Kahlenberg and his work with Atidna has been covered in various media outlets, including CNN, ABC News, Good Morning America, The Forward, Al Jazeera, The Times of London, NBC, NPR, Texas Tribune, Austin American-Statesman and The Chronicle. He has previously written opinion pieces for Newsday, Times of Israel, and International Policy Digest.
