= Hanan Schlesinger =

American-Israeli rabbi

Rabbi Hanan Schlesinger
- חנן שלזינגר
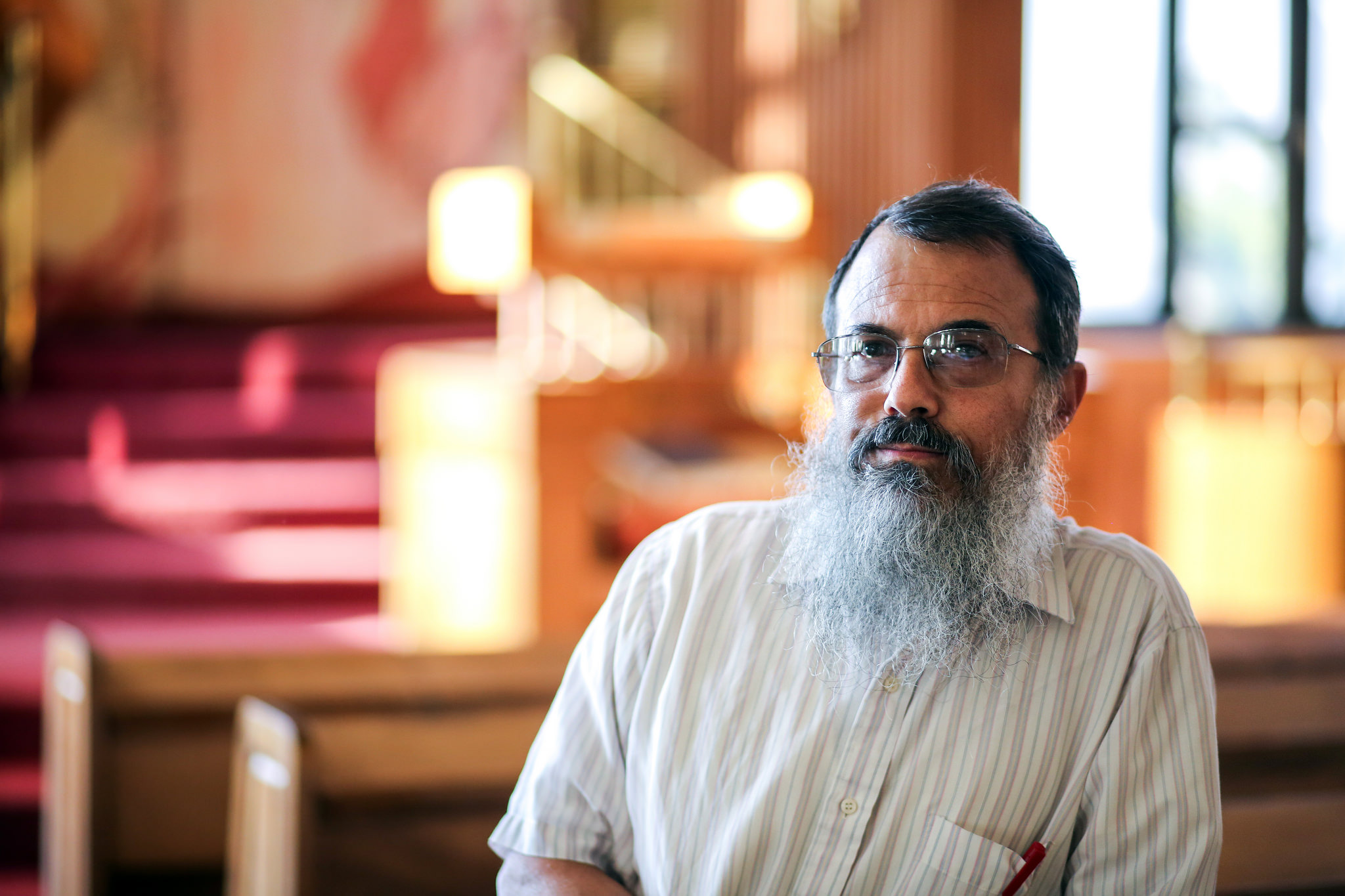
- Rabbi Schlesinger, Speaking Tour 2015 with Ali Abu Awwad
- Born: Brooklyn, New York
- Education: Yeshivat Har Etzion, Hebrew University
- Occupations: Rabbi, educator, grassroots peacemaker
- Organization: Roots

Rabbi Hanan Schlesinger (Hebrew: חנן שלזינגר) is an Israeli Orthodox rabbi and activist. Along with Ali Abu Awwad and Shaul Judelman, Schlesinger cofounded Roots – Judur – Shorashim, a joint Palestinian-Israeli grassroots peacemaking initiative dedicated to understanding nonviolence and transformation, where he currently remains director of international relations. He also serves as the Executive Director and Community Rabbinic Scholar for the Jewish Studies Initiative of North Texas and as coordinator for Faiths in Conversation, a framework for Muslim-Jewish-Christian interfaith dialogue which he found in 2012.

A biography regarding his speaking engagements writes, “In these two capacities, he (Schlesinger) teaches adult education classes on Judaism and spearheads interfaith projects throughout the greater Dallas area. He is also a member of the Rabbinical Council of America and the International Rabbinic Fellowship, as well as Beit Hillel (an Israeli rabbinical association dedicated to influencing a more inclusive, Halakha-observant Judaism). He is a Rabbis Without Borders Fellow, and was honored in 2013 and again in 2014 as the Memnosyne Institute Interfaith Scholar.

== Early life ==
After growing up in New York, Schlesinger moved to Israel at the age of 20, served in the Israeli Defense Forces, and completed a BA through Empire State College, the open university of New York State. He has invested a great deal in strengthening his Jewish education, having studied over ten years in Israeli Yeshivot, primarily at Yeshivat Har Etzion, and in an M.A. program of Jewish Philosophy at Hebrew University.

The first part of his professional career was dedicated to teaching Jewish studies in various colleges and seminaries in the Jerusalem area, as well as in different frameworks in Florida and Texas. Schlesinger's website details his various engagements in Jewish education over the years: “From 1998 to 2000 he served as a fellow in the Judaic Fellows Program of Boca Raton, Florida. In 2005 Rabbi Schlesinger came to Dallas, Texas to serve as the head of the Community Kollel, and he spent eight years serving the Dallas Jewish community. When the Community Kollel folded in 2010, he founded the Jewish Studies Initiative of North Texas to continue the educational work he had been doing in the larger Jewish community of Dallas."

He has four grown children and twelve grandchildren.

== Interfaith work ==
Ten years ago in Dallas, Schlesinger began his work in cultivating interfaith dialogue and connections across faith and cultural backgrounds. He served as a speaker for a local organization called Connecting our Faiths and later spearheaded the founding of Faiths in Conversation, a framework for Jewish-Christian-Muslim theological dialogue. His website notes, “The experience of these trialogues inspired him to attempt to meet Muslims and Christians back in the Holy Land." Activities involving inter-religious exchange play a significant role in the efforts of Roots to forge connections between Israelis, a majority Jewish population, and Palestinians, a majority Muslim population.

=== Personal transformation ===
Schlesinger, an Orthodox rabbi and teacher, is also a self-described “passionate Zionist settler." He moved to the West Bank in 1983 “out a deep sense of the fact that Jewish destiny has come to a deep consummation, and I wanted to be part of the Jewish destiny…In front of my eyes, I saw the fulfillment of 2,000 years of Jewish dreams and hopes, and the resilience of a people, after so much destruction. I saw the triumph of the spirit, the fulfillment and consummation of our people, and I saw tremendous justice in it. I saw the triumph of the human spirit. I saw justice all around me". His website notes that he had never “met a Palestinian as an equal until he returned to Gush Etzion from Dallas” a few years ago."

A small group of Israelis and Palestinians, inspired by the peacemaking work of Rabbi Menachem Froman, were meeting locally in the West Bank when Schlesinger returned to live in Alon Shvut. In early 2014, he was invited to one such gathering in which he encountered Awwad. Speaking to Palestinians “as equals” forever changed his perception of the Middle East conflict. In an article ruminating this experience, Schlesinger writes, “I heard stories that were so different from my stories, stories that created strange unfamiliar narratives from the same building blocks as my own narrative, but which I could not reject out of hand. The stories I heard—of deep connection to the land, of exile, of suffering, of humiliation, of loved one lost in the conflict—were authentic and they were real. Never before had I heard such stories. And they affected me deeply."

In another article, he mentions, “I have never been the same since that fateful day when I met the Palestinians who are today my friends, partners and life guides.”

Roots developed out of experiences of personal transformation like Schlesinger's: “We created Roots as a framework to bring these two sides together, to listen very deeply to each other, and to find a way to absorb some of the Other’s truth and fear and narrative and identity into our own identities” Schlesinger said.”

Schlesinger remains dedicated to building a grassroots movement that through understanding and nonviolence achieves genuine peace, justice, security, and dignity for Palestinians and Israelis.

=== Roots – Judur – Shorashim activism ===
Schlesinger, generally with Ali Abu Awwad, Antwan Saca, or Noor Awaad, speaks to international audiences, abroad and at the organization’s center in the heart of Gush Etzion and abutting the Palestinian town of Beit Ummar, about his story of transformation and the story of Roots. He also forges one-on-one connections with local Palestinians, convenes house gatherings between Israelis and Palestinians, and leads interreligious learning groups.

Commenting on the nature of the conflict, Schlesinger is quoted as saying, “There are absolutely religious elements to the (Israeli-Arab) conflict. Those elements are often ignored by secular politicians who want to sweep them under a rock and think that if we ignore them, we could make peace between secular Jews and secular Palestinians. But we believe that religion is playing a role in the conflict and we believe it has to play a role and can play a role in the solution.”

His own religiosity opened up the conversation with the Palestinian experience he once unwittingly ignored: “I had been blind to the story of Palestinians, so I began to develop the religious ideology that is based in the mysticism that sees God as the infinite collection of partial truths. And then, six months after we first met, we see that we have created something.”

Writing of this impetus, a spiritual mysticism, Schlesinger reflects, “My life has become so much more complicated as I hold within my consciousness two conflicting truths that are both valid. Loose ends are dangling within me. I have become much more fragmented yet much more whole. As I embrace more and more partial truths, my horizons expand in the direction of the Infinite One, within Whom all truths find their proper place.”

A passionate belief in pluralism stands as a pillar of Schlesinger's peacemaking efforts. Striving toward pluralism, undergoing reconciliation, however, can be an unsettling experience: “It’s unmooring, in that it gives one a sense of losing one’s sense of identity. On the other hand, he notes that living beyond one’s personal or inherited truth is a “very mind-expanding and soul-expanding experience because you realize that, even though you’ve left the place where you’re anchored, you’re in a process of expanding your truth and coming closer to a truer truth because it’s more inclusive and takes into account more nuances.”

In a 2016 article in the Israeli daily newspaper Haaretz, Schlesinger sent a message to Palestinians: “The way to undermine the occupation is to show us your humanity, to demonstrate to the vast majority of Israelis who dream of peace that the vast majority of Palestinians dream of the same thing. That is a message that Israeli society simply won’t be able to resist.”

The same article touches upon the anti-normalization movement in the West Bank, which sees any contact with Israelis as unacceptable, and how it remains an obstacle to Roots’ efforts. Schlesinger makes a rejoinder to the movement: “Instead of encouraging contact that would allow each side to humanize the other, efforts to build barriers between our two peoples encourage us all to remain stuck in an ‘us’ and ‘them’ zero-sum game.”

He goes on, “We need the Palestinians to allow us to get to know them. For far too many Israelis, the words “Palestinian" and "terrorist" are interchangeable, and “relations" with Palestinians have been limited to construction sites and menial labor. They are little more than blood-thirsty bus-bombers, barely alive as real human characters in the story of our joint Holy Land. Palestinians must show us their human face. They must allow themselves to engage in dialogue and human reconciliation so that we break out of stereotypes and ignorant misconceptions. Ironically, we need the Palestinians to rescue us from this mess. Only with their help can we get out of this quagmire and return to our true selves."

His work at Roots reflects a belief that human contact and dialogue will prepare the ground from which justice and freedom, peace and security, can take root.
