= Ali Abu Awwad =

Palestinian peace activist

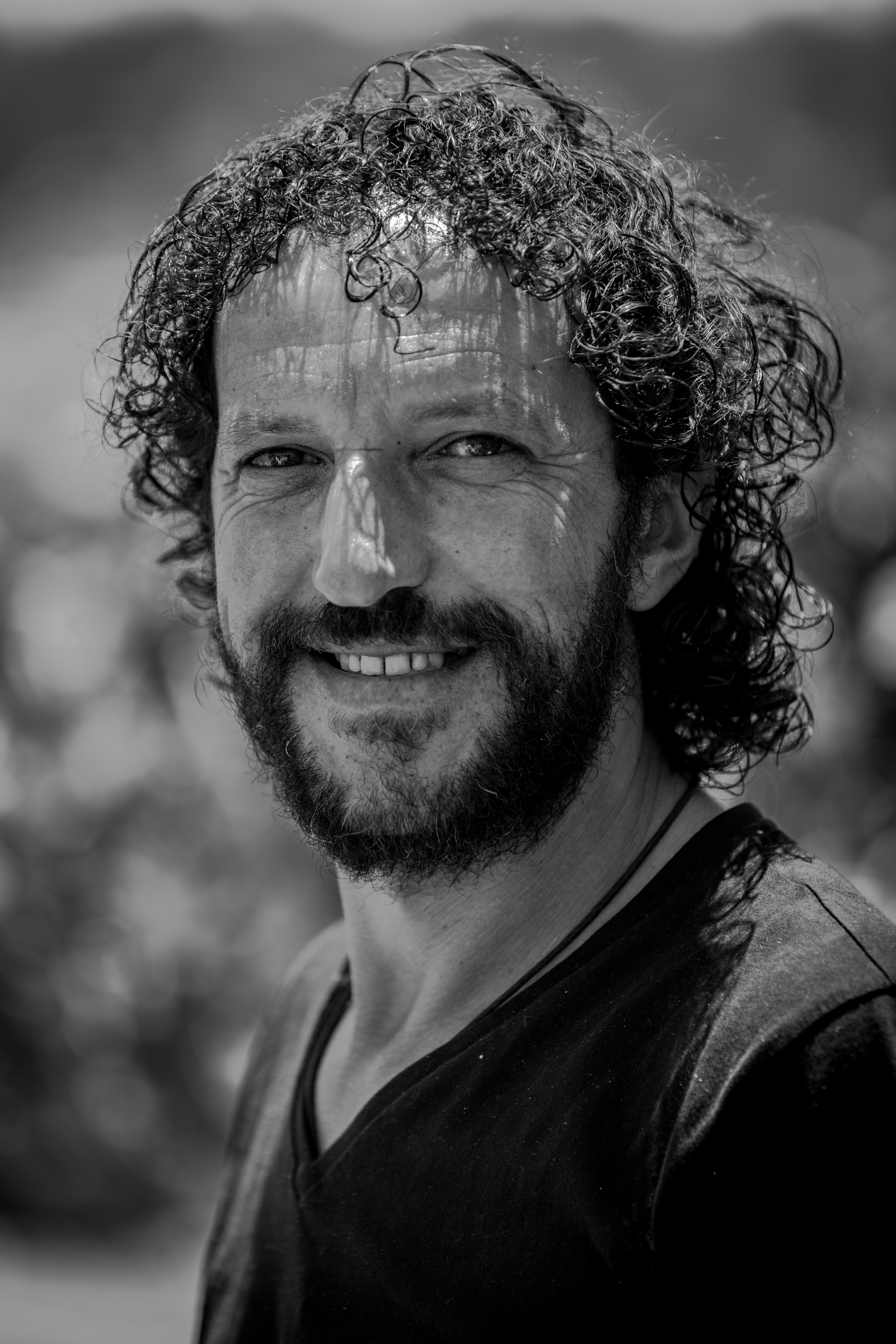
- Ali Abu Awwad, July 2014.
- Born: 1972 (age 53–54); Halhul, West Bank
- Known for: Palestinian activist and nonviolence community leader

Ali Abu Awwad (Arabic: علي أبو عواد, born 1972) is a prominent Palestinian peace activist and proponent of nonviolence. He is the founder of Taghyeer (Change), a Palestinian national movement promoting nonviolence to achieve and guarantee a nonviolent solution to the conflict. Awwad's story and efforts have been featured in over twelve documentaries including two award-winning films, Encounter Point and Forbidden Childhood. Furthermore, he was honored by the global nonprofit thinktank Synergos as the Arab World Social Innovator in Palestine for "introducing non-violence, reconciliation, and civic participation to Palestinians as a means of empowering citizens to seek social change and find a more equitable solution to conflict." Awwad is currently finishing his memoir called Painful Hope, an account of his experiences as well as his strategy and vision for the Palestinian future. He lives in Beit Ummar, near Hebron.

== Biography ==
Refugees from Al-Qubayba near Bayt Jibrin, Awwad's family was forced off their land in the 1948 Palestine war (The Nakba) and subsequently settled in Beit Ummar. Awwad, born in Halhoul in Hebron Governorate in the West Bank, was raised in a politically active family and at a young age, following in his mother's footsteps, became a member of Fatah. (His mother was a close associate of Yasser Arafat and was a leader of Fatah in the region).

Prior to becoming a nonviolent activist, he served two prison sentences in Israel. First arrested while studying for secondary exams (after an Israeli helicopter observer reported seeing him throw stones), Awwad refused to pay a 1,500 shekel fine, stating later that, although a stone-thrower, he had not participated that day.

Eight months later, he took part in the First Intifada as a teenager, and was subsequently sentenced to 10 years in prison on charges of stone-throwing, throwing Molotov cocktails, and being active in a military cell. According to Awwad, his major crime consisted in refusing to cooperate with his interrogators who wanted information concerning his mother's political activities. He served four years and was released after the signing of the Oslo Accords. Along with 280 released prisoners, he was confined to Jericho for the remainder of his sentence.

Awwad's story of transformation, from former militant to supporter and educator of nonviolence, began during his second stint in prison. In 1993, he coordinated a hunger strike with his mother, also in prison at the time, in order for them to see each other. After 17 days on strike, their confiners permitted the request. The success of the strike was a turning point: "When we succeeded, it transformed my political mind; I realised that another, non-violent, way to achieve my rights existed. I had been blinded by arguments – about blame, victimhood, punishment and justice. But now I realised that showing my humanity in a non-violent way was the best weapon to achieve my rights."

On his release, he was recruited by the PA as a security officer, working for them until he resigned in 1997 out of disagreement and despair.

On 20 October 2000, after the outbreak of the Al Aqsa Intifada, According to Awwad he was shot in the leg by an Israeli settler. He was evacuated to Saudi Arabia, where he received medical treatment. On returning, Awwad learned of his brother Yousef's death. Yousef was an employee of a company that worked with the Jewish National Fund, and, according to his brother, was not involved in militant activities. He was shot in the head by an Israeli soldier at a close distance. (In a further account, Awwad says the shooting arose from talking back to the soldier, a violation of a new regulation of which he was unaware).

Yousef's tragedy marked another turn in Awwad's personal and political life: "My brother wasn't a criminal or a terrorist, he was my best friend, a beautiful man who had two kids who he wanted to raise," he recalls. "I spent sleepless nights with my suffering. I struggled with the concepts of justice and revenge. But taking revenge was not the answer for me. Not because there was a lack of pain or anger but because what I wanted was justice. Yet the only real justice – to have my brother back again – was impossible. When I realised that, I hated myself, my enemy and the whole world. I felt that I was the victim of everyone."

== Becoming an activist ==
Awwad, together with his mother and brother Khalid, became a member of the Bereaved Families Forum, after its founder reached out to the family expressing condolences and support. A year after Yousef's death, Awwad's mother hosted a group of bereaved Israeli parents. At the forum, Awwad met and was befriended by Robi Damelin. Their connection resulted in a years-long world tour, the two activists arguing that peace can only occur if reconciliation takes place between the victims. Awwad's political consciousness changed as a result of these talks.

"I began a complex, painful journey in non-violence and reconciliation, touring almost 40 countries and speaking out in order to bring this message. But I also realised it was essential to create a national Palestinian non-violent movement that would ensure two things: that we could resist occupation non-violently, but [also] that we would stop being victims and begging others to help us. I believe this first step has to come from us. This doesn't mean Israel isn't guilty or that we are angels. But we have to create a place where we will no longer be prisoners of the anger that this situation creates every day. We must escape the prison of our narrative."

Along with other activists, ex-prisoners, and youth, Awwad created the Taghyeer movement with the aim "to show people that they can develop themselves without waiting for others." He adds, "We have visited communities and engaged community leaders in order to create the mass movement that will guarantee enough pressure [and support] on politicians of both sides."

== Taghyeer and nonviolence ==
Awwad began reading into the nonviolent strategies and philosophies of Gandhi, Mandela, and Martin Luther King Jr. while imprisoned. Acting upon those principles first with the hunger strike and later by founding and organizing Taghyeer, Awwad sees nonviolence as manifesting a lifestyle of successfully defending one's rights.

On 24 September 2016, Taghyeer organized a mass demonstration in support of "nonviolent transformation" for over 3,000 Palestinian men, women, and children hailing from areas throughout the West Bank. The movement also serves as a grassroots initiative incubator, organizing workshops and community actions to empower local Palestinians by identifying "community priorities" and by initiating "the appropriate projects throughout the West Bank."

Taghyeer, the Metta Center for Nonviolence writes, is dedicated "to fostering Palestinian national nonviolent identity in action – through which communities, leaders, and organizations come together to address social development needs, and at the same time resist occupation and open a path to resolution of the Palestinian-Israeli conflict."

When peace negotiations have stalled and Palestinian suffering continues, Awwad points to nonviolence as a path for hope: "The Palestinians have been living in extreme despair for years and both the international community and Israeli society have given us no hope, no model of peaceful solution. The role of nonviolence is to speak to people's despair – not to tell them they are right, but to show them a way out."

Nonviolence, as Awwad sees it, transforms those who embody its way of life: "I think nonviolence is the celebration of my existence. I used to wake up, and I wish that I was not born. Today I wake up and I celebrate this."

== Reconciliation efforts ==
Awwad is a friend of Rabbi Hanan Schlesinger, a Jewish leader of Roots. They have been on several international tours together, speaking about their stories of personal transformation and building awareness of their efforts to forge reconciliation and understanding between Israelis and Palestinians.

When met with criticism for these efforts, especially in regard to speaking with right wing Jews, Awwad responds that dialogue does not start with agreement, but rather is "the secure place for argument," adding, "If we don't dialogue with the people we disagree with how can we have any solutions." After meeting Awwad, among other Palestinians, Schlesinger underwent a reconfiguration of his political and spiritual self: "When you only live among your own and only know your own narrative, you are naturally very suspicious of the other who is just an intruder and just a thorn in your side and something that doesn't belong there," he says. "But when you open up your heart and you see the other, you begin to see the truth is complex – that my truth is true, but it's a partial truth and there's another truth that's also partial and I have to learn to put them together and make the larger truth. I believe we can do that."

David Shulman, who describes him as one of the leaders of a new generation of nonviolent resisters in Palestine, quotes him as arguing: "The Jews are not my enemy; their fear is my enemy. We must help them to stop being so afraid – their whole history has terrified them – but I refuse to be a victim of Jewish fear anymore."[15]

David Shulman has cited Awwad as one of three exponents of satyagraha active on the West bank, together with Abdallah Abu Rahmah and the Israeli peace activist Ezra Nawi [16]. "Some people think that satyagraha [Gandhi's word for nonviolence] is weakness; they believe the angrier you are, the stronger you will be. This is a great mistake. ... You cannot practice nonviolence without listening to the other side's narrative. But first you have to give up being the victim. When you do that, no one will be able to victimize you again" [17].

Yet even for Awwad, dialogue work merely scratches the surface of what is required to bring dignity, security, and peace to the Holy Land. Taghyeer, according to him, remains the path forward.

"Our role is not to dialogue forever. Dialogue is only a carrier from truth to a bigger truth. The bigger truth is what we need to do for peace: not only building a non-violent identity, but creating a mass movement on the ground – where hundreds of thousands of people will come onto the street to force the political leadership to sit and find a solution that we will all benefit from," commenting that the bigger truth is having two truths fit in the land with dignity and freedom.

== Political vision ==
Awwad's speeches often bring up a dichotomy between being right and being successful, his personal preference the latter—a reality he sees materializing through mass political and social pressure: a movement of hundreds of Palestinians that will stand up nonviolently for their rights, and an Israeli mirror to support the cause.

According to his political vision, a national framework must be developed for peace: "It has to be a national movement on the ground. A national nonviolent movement because peace for us is not to dialogue with Israelis… Dialogue is not a goal for us." In the same Tedx Jerusalem speech, he continues, "Peace for us is not to go to five-star peace conferences, where these organizations take their members to feel good with themselves and they eat hummus and hug each other. Peace for us is not to continue a good life. Peace for us is to start living, because we are not alive. … Peace is engagement in normal life conditions," in which human and national rights are in harmony with people's lives."

== See also ==
- List of peace activists
