= Adin Steinsaltz =

Israeli rabbi and educator (1937–2020)

Rabbi Adin Even-Israel Steinsaltz
- עדין אבן־ישראל שטיינזלץ
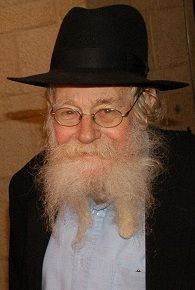
- Steinsaltz in 2010
- Born: Adin Steinsaltz; 11 July 1937; Jerusalem, Mandatory Palestine (now Israel)
- Died: 7 August 2020 (aged 83); Jerusalem, Israel
- Resting place: Har HaZeitim
- Education: Hebrew University of Jerusalem
- Occupations: Rabbi, author
- Notable work: The Talmud: The Steinsaltz Edition
- Spouse: Sarah
- Children: Menachem, Amechaye, Esther Sheleg

Adin Even-Israel Steinsaltz (Hebrew: עדין אבן־ישראל שטיינזלץ; 11 July 1937 – 7 August 2020) was an Israeli Chabad rabbi, teacher, philosopher, social critic, author, translator and publisher.

Steinsaltz originally published The Talmud: The Steinsaltz Edition in modern Hebrew, with a running commentary to facilitate learning. It was subsequently translated into English, French, Russian, and Spanish. Beginning in 1989, Steinsaltz published several tractates in Hebrew and English of the Babylonian (Bavli) Talmud in an English-Hebrew edition. The first volume of a new English-Hebrew edition, the Koren Talmud Bavli, was released in May 2012, and has since been brought to completion.

Steinsaltz was a recipient of the Israel Prize for Jewish Studies (1988), the President's Medal (2012), and the Yakir Yerushalayim prize (2017).

Steinsaltz died in Jerusalem on 7 August 2020 from acute pneumonia.

== Biography ==
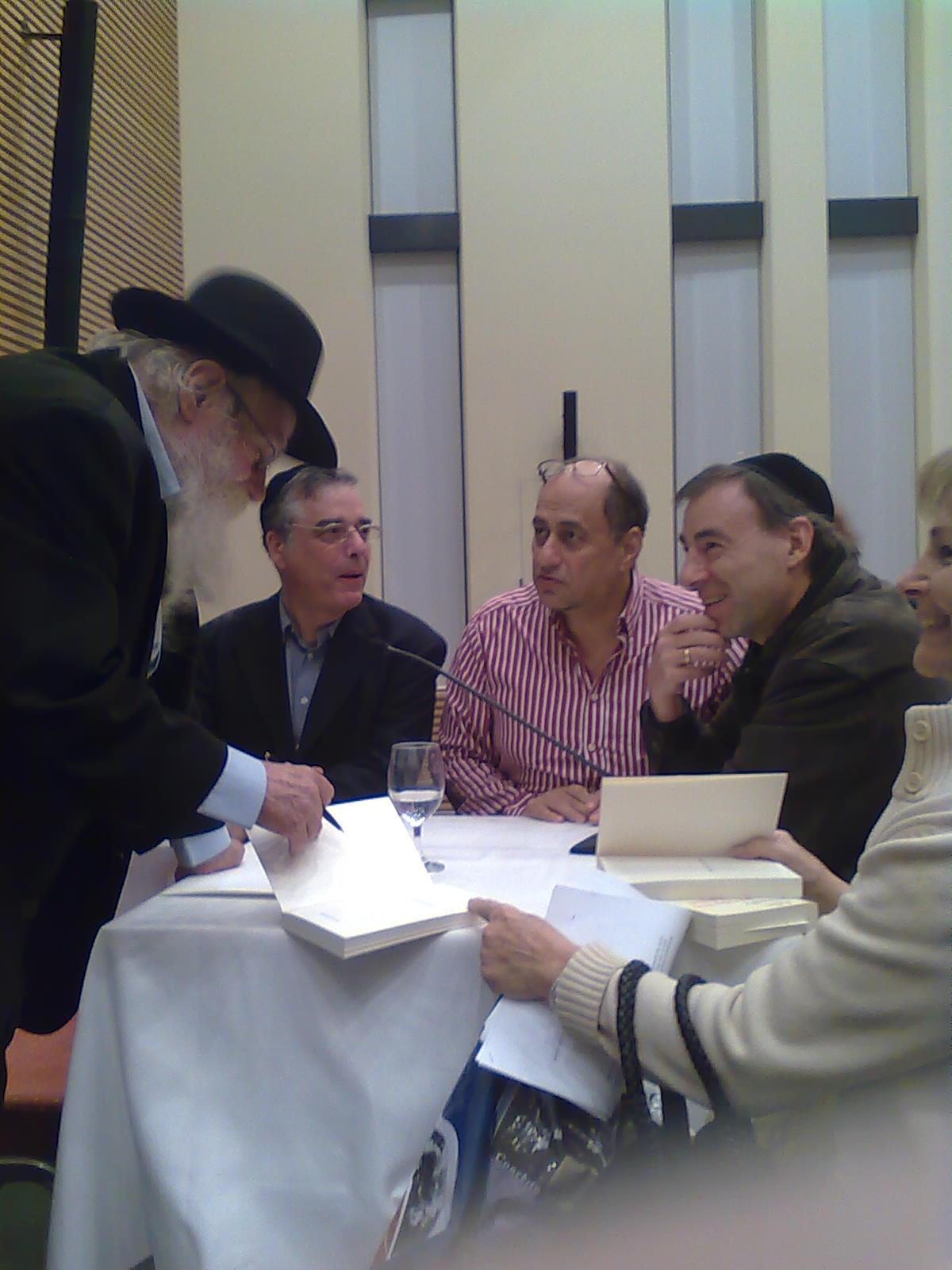
Steinsaltz in the Israelitische Cultusgemeinde Zürich (ICZ) in Zürich-Enge (2010)

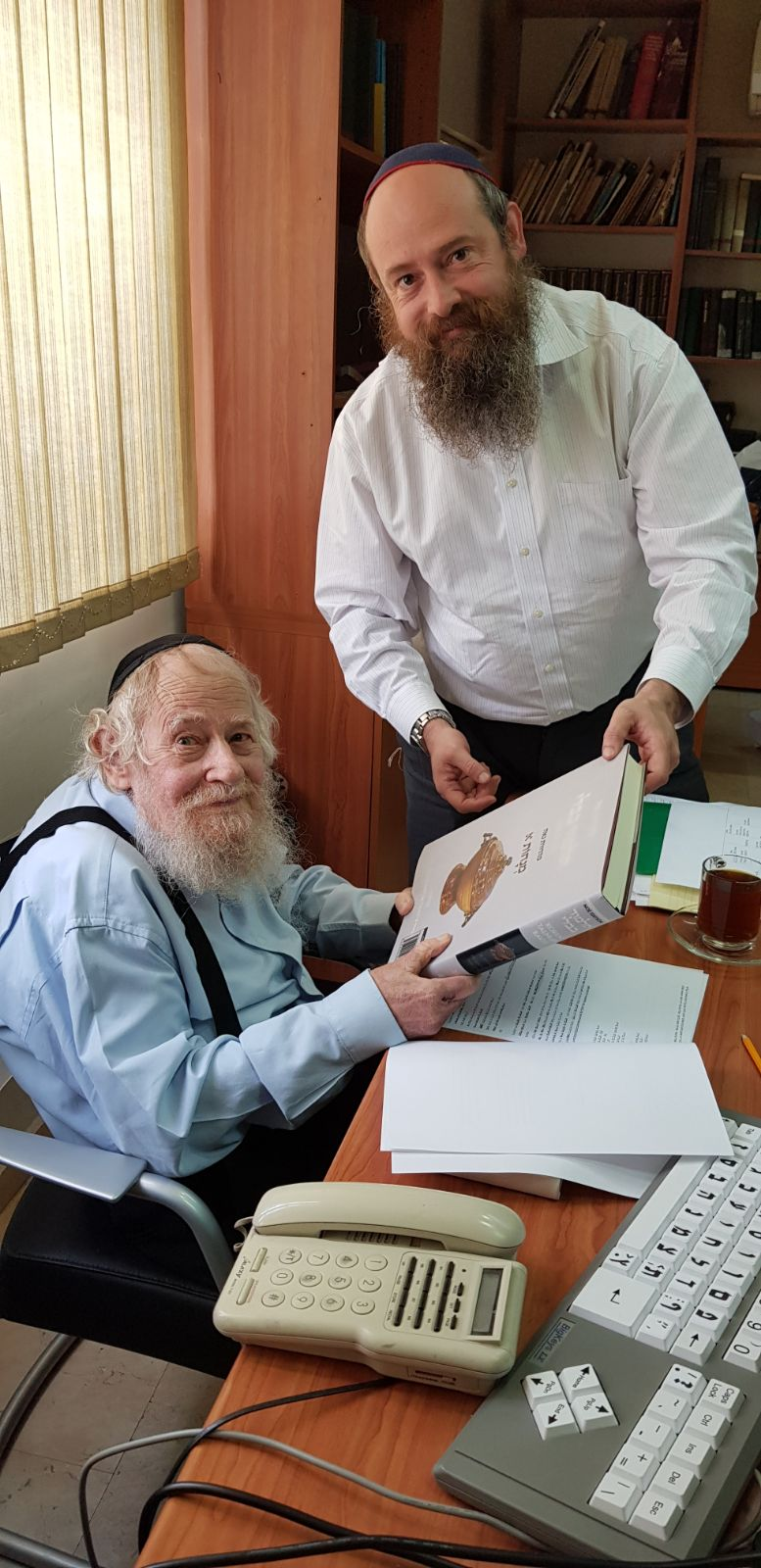
Steinsaltz and his son Meni Even-Israel with a volume of the English translation of his edition of the Talmud (2018).

Adin Steinsaltz was born in Jerusalem on 11 July 1937 to Avraham Steinsaltz and Leah (née Krokovitz). His father was a great-grandson of the first Slonimer Rebbe, Avrohom Weinberg, and was a student of Hillel Zeitlin. Avraham and Leah Steinsaltz met through Zeitlin. They immigrated to Mandatory Palestine in 1924. Avraham Steinsaltz, a devoted communist and member of Lehi, went to Spain in 1936 to fight with the International Brigades in the Spanish Civil War. Adin was born the following year.

Steinsaltz became a baal teshuva during his teenage years, encouraged by Rabbi Shmuel Elazar Heilprin (Rosh yeshiva of Yeshivas Toras Emes Chabad) while studying mathematics, physics, and chemistry at the Hebrew University of Jerusalem, He also pursued rabbinical studies at Yeshivas Tomchei Temimim in Lod and studied with Dov Ber Eliezrov and Shmaryahu Noach Sasonkin. After graduation, he established several experimental schools following an unsuccessful attempt to establish a neo-Hassidic community in the Negev, At the age of 24, he became Israel's youngest school principal.

In 1965, he founded the Israel Institute for Talmudic Publications and began his work on the Talmud, including translation into Hebrew, English, Russian and other languages. The Steinsaltz editions of the Talmud include translation from the original Aramaic and a comprehensive commentary. Steinsaltz completed his Hebrew edition of the Babylonian Talmud in November 2010 and Koren Publishers Jerusalem became his publisher.

While not without criticism (such as by Jacob Neusner in 1998), the Steinsaltz edition is widely used throughout Israel, the United States, and the world.

Steinsaltz's classic work on Kabbalah, The Thirteen Petalled Rose, was first published in 1980 and now appears in eight languages. In all, Steinsaltz authored some 60 books and hundreds of articles on subjects including Talmud, Jewish mysticism, Jewish philosophy, sociology, historical biography, and philosophy. Many of these works were translated into English by his close friend, Yehuda Hanegbi. His memoir-biography on the Lubavitcher Rebbe, Rabbi Menachem Mendel Schneerson, was published by Maggid Books (2014).

Continuing his work as a teacher and spiritual mentor, Steinsaltz joined the original faculty of the nondenominational Pardes Institute of Jewish Studies in Jerusalem in 1972, along with David Hartman, Eliezer Schweid, Menachem Froman, Dov Berkovits, and others. He established Yeshivat Makor Chaim alongside Rabbis Menachem Froman and Shimon Gershon Rosenberg in 1984 and Yeshivat Tekoa in 1999. He also served as president of the Shefa Middle and High Schools. He has served as scholar in residence at the Woodrow Wilson International Center for Scholars in Washington, D.C., and the Institute for Advanced Study in Princeton. His honorary degrees include doctorates from Yeshiva University, Ben Gurion University of the Negev, Bar Ilan University, Brandeis University, and Florida International University. Steinsaltz was also Rosh Yeshiva of Yeshivat Hesder Tekoa.

Being a follower of Rabbi Menachem Mendel Schneerson of Chabad, he went to help Jews in the Soviet Union assisting Chabad's shluchim (emissaries) network. In 1995, the chief rabbi of Russia, Adolf Shayevich, gave Steinzaltz the title of Duchovny Ravin ("Spiritual Rabbi"), a historic Russian title that indicated that he was the spiritual mentor of Russian Jewry. In this capacity, Steinsaltz travelled to Russia and the Soviet Union once each month from his home in Jerusalem. During his time in the former Soviet Union, he founded the Jewish University, both in Moscow and Saint Petersburg. The Jewish University is the first degree-granting institution of Jewish studies in the former Soviet Union. In 1991, on Schneerson's advice, he changed his family name from Steinsaltz to Even-Israel, 'Stone of Israel' in English. Schneerson suggested the name Even Melach, 'Salt Stone' in English, as recorded in his meeting with the Rebbe in 1990. Besides Chabad, Steinsaltz was also inspired by the teachings of Menachem Mendel of Kotzk. He was in close contact with the fifth Gerrer Rebbe, Yisrael Alter, and his brother and successor, Simcha Bunim Alter.

Steinsaltz took a cautious approach to interfaith dialogue. During a visit of a delegation of Roman Catholic cardinals in Manhattan in January 2004, he said that, "You do not have to raise over-expectations of a meeting, as it doesn't signify in itself a breakthrough; however, the opportunity for cardinals and rabbis to speak face to face is valuable. It's part of a process in which we can talk to each other in a friendly way", and called for "a theological dialogue that asks the tough questions, such as whether Catholicism allows for Jews to enter eternal paradise".

Steinsaltz and his wife lived in Jerusalem until his death and had three children and many grandchildren and great-grandchildren. In 2016, Steinsaltz suffered a stroke, leaving him unable to speak. His son, Rabbi Menachem ("Meni") Even-Israel, is the executive director of the Steinsaltz Center, Steinsaltz's umbrella organization located in the Nachlaot neighborhood of Jerusalem.

Steinsaltz died in Jerusalem on 7 August 2020, from acute pneumonia at the Shaare Tzedek Medical Center. He was hospitalized earlier in the week with a severe lung infection. His wife Sarah survived him, together with three children and eighteen grandchildren.

== As an author ==
Steinsaltz was a prolific author and commentator who wrote numerous books on Jewish knowledge, tradition and culture, and produced original commentaries on a huge portion of the Jewish canon: Tanakh (the Jewish bible), the Babylonian Talmud, the Mishna, the Mishneh Torah, Tanya, and Torah Or/Likutei Torah.

His published works include:

- Biblical Images (1984)
- The Candle of God (1998)
- A Dear Son to Me (2011)
- The Essential Talmud (1976)
- A Guide to Jewish Prayer (2000)
- The Passover Haggadah (1983)
- In the Beginning (1992)
- My Rebbe (2014)
- The Tales of Rabbi Nachman of Bratslav (1993)
- On Being Free (1995)
- The Miracle of the Seventh Day (2003)
- Simple Words (1999)
- The Strife of the Spirit (1988)
- A Reference Guide to The Talmud (1989)
- Talmudic Images (1997)
- Learning from the Tanya (2005)
- Opening the Tanya (2003)
- Understanding the Tanya (2007)
- Teshuvah (1982)
- The Longer Shorter Way (1988)
- The Seven Lights: On the Major Jewish Festivals (2000)
- The Sustaining Utterance (1989)
- The Thirteen Petalled Rose (1980)
- We Jews (2005)
- The Woman of Valor (1994)

== As a speaker ==
Steinsaltz was invited to speak at the Aspen Institute for Humanistic Studies at Yale University in 1979.

Prior to his stroke, he gave evening seminars in Jerusalem, which, according to Newsweek, usually lasted until 2:00 in the morning and attracted prominent politicians, such as the former Prime Minister Levi Eshkol and former Finance Minister Pinchas Sapir.

== Awards and critical reception ==
On 21 April 1988, Steinsaltz received the Israel Prize for Jewish Studies.

On 9 February 2012, Steinsaltz was honored by Israeli President Shimon Peres with Israel's first President's Prize alongside Zubin Mehta, Uri Slonim, Henry Kissinger, Judy Feld Carr, and the Rashi Foundation.[15] Steinsaltz was presented with this award for his contribution to the study of Talmud, making it more accessible to Jews worldwide.

Steinsaltz was also presented with the 2012 National Jewish Book Award in the category of Modern Jewish Thought & Experience by the Jewish Book Council for his commentary, translation, and notes in the Koren Babylonian Talmud. The Modern Jewish Thought & Experience award was awarded on 15 January 2013 in memory of Joy Ungerleider Mayerson by the Dorot Foundation.

On 22 May 2017, Jerusalem Mayor Nir Barkat visited Steinsaltz at his home to present him with the Yakir Yerushalayim ("Worthy Citizen of Jerusalem") medal. This medal of achievement was awarded to Steinsaltz for his writing and translating work.

On 10 June 2018, Steinsaltz was honored at a Gala Dinner at the Orient Hotel in Jerusalem for his pedagogical achievements throughout a lifetime dedicated to Jewish education. A limited-edition version of "The Steinsaltz Humash" was presented to the attendees of this event.

== Public reception ==
=== Academic criticism ===
Jacob Neusner published an attack on the Reference Guide in 1998, strongly disagreeing with several claims in the Guide. In what was an overall favorable review, Dr. Jeremy Brown notes that the Koren Talmud Bavli contains some inaccurate scientific information, such as identifying Ursa Major as a star and describing polycythemia vera as a disease causing excessive bleeding from the gums and from ordinary cuts. Aharon Feldman penned a lengthy critical review of the Steinsaltz Talmud contending that the work "is marred by an extraordinary number of inaccuracies stemming primarily from misreadings of the sources; it fails to explain those difficult passages which the reader would expect it to explain; and it confuses him with notes which are often irrelevant, incomprehensible, and contradictory." Feldman says he fears that, "An intelligent student utilizing the Steinsaltz Talmud as his personal instructor might in fact conclude that Talmud in general is not supposed to make sense." Furthermore, writes Feldman, the Steinsaltz Talmud gives off the impression that the Talmud is "intellectually flabby, inconsistent, and often trivial."

=== Haredi reaction and ban ===
Publication of the Steinsaltz Hebrew translation of the Talmud in the 1960s received endorsements from prominent rabbis including Rabbi Moshe Feinstein and Chacham Ovadia Yosef. However, in 1989, when the English version appeared, Steinsaltz faced a fierce backlash from many leading rabbis in Israel such as Harav Elazar Shach, Harav Yosef Shalom Eliashiv, Harav Eliezer Waldenberg, Harav Nissim Karelitz, Harav Chaim Pinchas Scheinberg, and Harav Shmuel Wosner, who harshly condemned his work and other publications. Branding him a heretic, Rav Shach was at the forefront of a campaign which banned all his works, believing that his literary and psychological explanations of biblical characters and events rendered them heretical. He also slated his translation of the Talmud, describing it as being written in the style of a secular book causing "any trace of holiness and faith to vanish." Waldenberg wrote that he was shocked to see the way in which Steinsaltz described the Patriarchs and Talmudic sages, writing that the works had the power to "poison the souls" of those who read them. Striking a more conciliatory tone in the controversy, however, were the Gerer Hasidim who praised his works and commended him on his willingness to amend various passages "which could have been misconstrued." After the Jerusalem-based Edah Charedis limited the ban to three books, Steinsaltz publicly apologised for his error and offered to refund anyone who had bought the books. The ban nevertheless caused thousands of schools and individuals to discard the Steinsaltz Talmud, with Rabbi Avigdor Nebenzahl ordering all copies to be placed in genizah. This led to more liberal Jewish movements placing adverts in the press asking for the edition to be donated to their institutions instead. For his part, Steinsaltz countered that much of the criticism he faced was rooted in opposition to the Chabad-Lubavitch community with which he was affiliated.

=== Praise ===
While certain members of the Haredi community may have opposition to Steinsaltz's works, other Jewish leaders, rabbis, and authors have spoken or written about their appreciation for Steinsaltz's unique educational approach. Rabbi John Rosove of Temple Israel of Hollywood featured "Opening The Tanya", "Learning the Tanya", and "Understanding the Tanya" on his list of the top ten recommended Jewish books. These volumes are written by Rabbi Shneur Zalman of Liadi, the founder of the Chabad Lubavitch movement, and include commentary by Steinsaltz. Through reading the Tanya, readers can explore all aspects of the central text of Chabad movement. Rabbi Elie Kaunfer, a rosh yeshiva and the CEO of Mechon Hadar Yeshiva, discussed his gratitude for Steinsaltz's Global Day of Jewish Learning and the opportunity created by this online platform for learning and creating a deeper connection to Torah, other Jewish text, and Jews worldwide. Rabbi Pinchas Allouche, who studied under Steinsaltz, notes that Steinsaltz "is a world scholar" who "revolutionized the Jewish landscape" through his commentary, other writings, and educational organizations. In 1988, secular Israeli historian Zeev Katz compared Steinsaltz's importance to that of Rashi and Maimonides, two Jewish scholars of medieval times. In addition, Ilana Kurshan, an American-Israeli author, wrote that Steinsaltz's ability to bring "the historical world of the Talmudic sages to life" created an enjoyable Jewish learning experience for her when she was intensely studying Talmud.

== See also ==
- List of Israel Prize recipients
- Modern attempts to revive the Sanhedrin
