= Roots – Judur – Shorashim =

Non-profit peace organization for Palestinian and Israelis

- Formation: January 2014
- Founders: Ali Abu Awwad; Shaul Judelman; Hanan Schlesinger
- Website: https://www.friendsofroots.net/

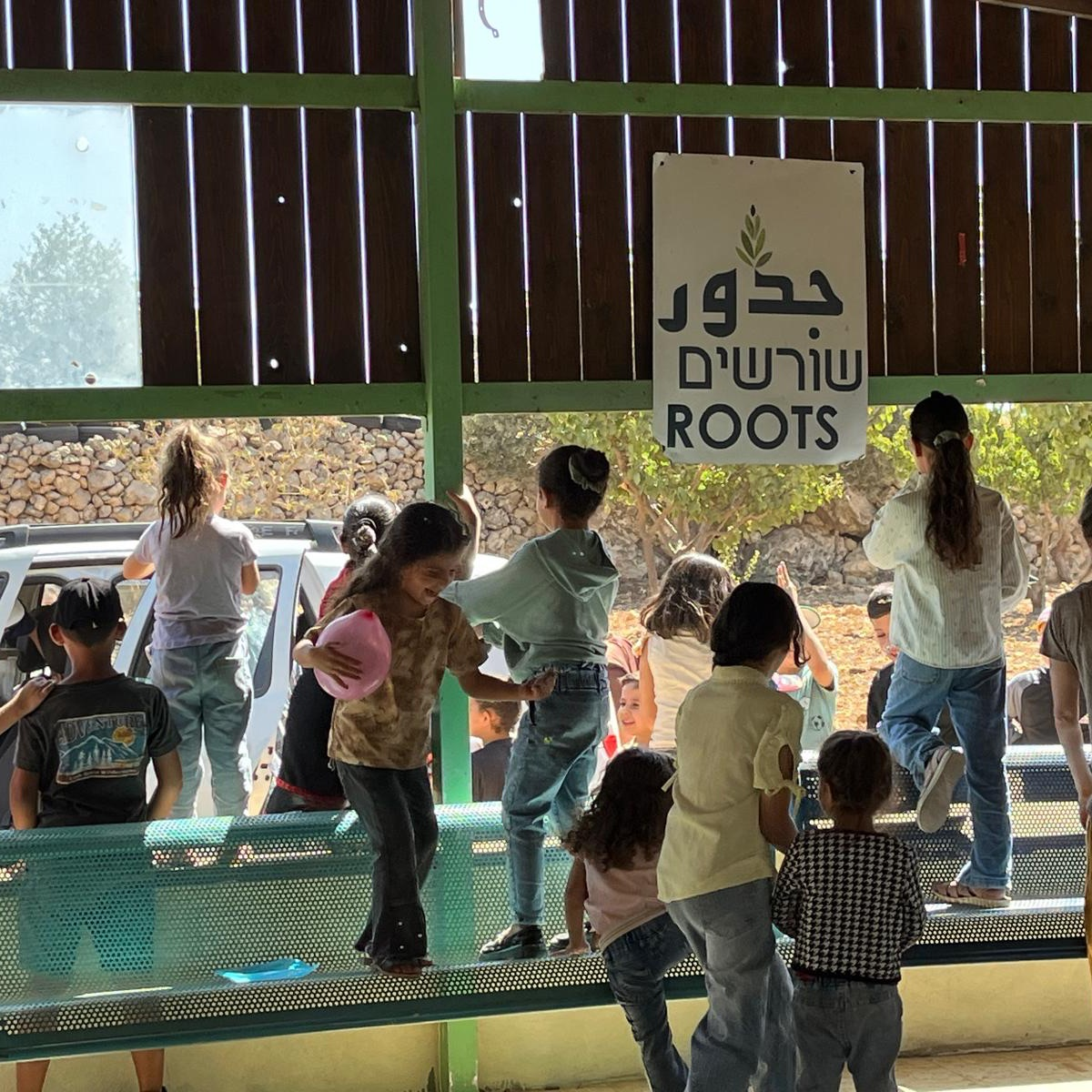
Roots' Dignity Center in Gush Etzion-Bethlehem

Roots – Judur – Shorashim is a non-profit based in the West Bank area of Gush Etzion, which aims to promote dialogue and trust between Israelis and Palestinians as a path to peace. They operate the only joint Israeli-Palestinian community center in the West Bank. In addition to their Gush Etzion center, they have three branches located in the Shomron area, the Jordan Valley and the South Hebron Hills.

The words “judur” and “shorashim” mean “roots” in Arabic and Hebrew respectively.

== History ==
In January 2014, community activists Ali Abu Awwad and Shaul Judelman, together with Rabbi Hanan Schlesinger and others, formed "Roots", building their joint Israeli-Palestinian community center – the Dignity Center – on Awwad's family's land near the village of Beit Ummar in the West Bank and 200 metres from the Gush Etzion Junction shopping center. The first meetings between Israelis and Palestinians had occurred on the property weeks earlier, and during that month the number of participants increased. Later that year, Roots helped to inspire the creation of B8 of Hope, a Geneva-based association that raised money for Roots and later expanded to support other grassroots efforts in Israel-Palestine.

In November 2015, after the arrest of a Palestinian member's son who was charged with stone throwing, the group advocated for the boy's release.

In 2019, Palestinian members of the group sent a letter of condolence to the family of Dvir Sorek, a Jewish settler and participant in a Roots dialogue group who had been murdered by two Palestinians, in which they condemned the violence committed against him. The non-profit also hosted a dialogue meeting between Sorek's yeshiva classmates and Palestinian members of the group.

In 2020, the group opposed plans for Israel to annex parts of the West Bank.

After the 7 October 2023 attacks and start of the Gaza War, most dialogical activities came to a halt and have gradually been resuming. Roots have also organized virtual sessions and fundraised for Palestinian families whose livelihoods have been interrupted by Israeli settlers.

== Values ==
Roots emphasizes that the Holy Land does not belong exclusively to either Jews or Palestinians; instead both peoples belong to the entire land from the Mediterranean Sea to the Jordan River: the title of their speaking tours “Two truths in one heart, two peoples in one land” expresses this idea. Roots does not directly weigh in on matters of Israeli settlement politics, but rather emphasizes that both sides must be allowed to live in the land in dignity, freedom, equality and security.

The organization believes that if religion is part of the problem, religion needs to be part of the solution. Rather than focusing on secular left-wing Jews and Palestinians in Israel proper, their target audience lives in the occupied West Bank – which they refer to as the “West Bank / Judea and Samaria” – meaning Jewish settlers, most of which are religious and identify as right-wing, and local Palestinians, many of whom are traditional Muslims. By involving people with views that are often considered an obstacle to any peace process, and exposing them to meaningful contact with their perceived enemies, they aim to bring all affected parties on board and to discourage extremists from obstructing a peaceful and equitable coexistence.

Roots' organizers have criticized both the 7 October attacks and the killing of civilians by the Israeli army.

== Activity before 7 October 2023 ==
Roots organized meetings between Israelis and Palestinians who live near each other in the West Bank in order to create dialogue. The project's outreach programs included monthly meetings between Israeli and Palestinian families, a women's group, biweekly activities for school children, photography workshops, summer camps, interfaith study and dialogue, and communal breaking of religious fasts such as shared Iftar meals. Other programs focused on language learning, cultural exchanges and engagement with local leaders. Almost all of the programs in the Gush Etzion/Bethlehem/Hebron area took place at their Dignity Center, with the three branches conducting similar programs on a much smaller scale.

On average 50 mechina (Israeli pre-army academy) groups annually visited Roots. For most participants, this was the first time they ever met or spoke to a Palestinian. In addition, every year 200-300 groups from Israel and around the world conducted visits to Roots, including student groups, interfaith groups and members of parliaments.

Beyond the activities held on-site, Roots members visited both Israeli and Palestinian victims of violence, helped Palestinian farmers to access farmland near Israeli settlements, and carried out joint charity drives, including blood drives. The group also held an annual Run for Reconciliation.

== Activity since 7 October 2023 ==
Group meetings and other programs were suspended for several months following the 7 October 2023 attacks, due to anger, hurt and fear on both the Israeli and Palestinian side as well as additional travel restrictions on Palestinians, but staff maintained contact with participants. Initially Roots concentrated on humanitarian needs by supporting displaced Israelis from the northern border and local Palestinians, many of whom had lost their jobs through Israeli withdrawal of work permits. Roots has also been lobbying against increased restrictions of movement of the Palestinian population, settler violence towards Palestinians and confiscation of Palestinian lands. In addition, they held intra-communal reconciliation dialogue sessions and provided trauma workshops. Face-to-face programs with Israeli and Palestinian adults as well as pre-army academy visits restarted in spring 2024, while the first Israeli-Palestinian children’s event occurred in the summer of 2024. Regular inter-communal encounter programs resumed in 2025. Since the war began, Roots has devoted increased energy to intra-community programs, meaning Palestinians separately and Israelis separately.

Currently academic research is being conducted by the University of Haifa regarding Roots’ encounter program of Israeli and Palestinian high school students in the West Bank, which ran for seven years. The aim is to discover which factors assist transformation of attitudes and to incorporate these insights into teacher training courses and curricula in order to facilitate peace-building.

== International work ==
Roots works in America and Europe via speaking tours and hosts Zoom meetings for followers all over the world. Roots' partner organization Atidna International, founded by peace activist and Roots board member Elijah Kahlenberg, is a campus-based organization working to bring Jewish/Arab and Israeli/Palestinian students together for dialogue and peace-building initiatives on college campuses.
